= 1856 in the United States =

- Decades: 1830s; 1840s; 1850s; 1860s; 1870s
- See also: History of the United States (1849–1865); Timeline of United States history (1820–1859); List of years in the United States

1856 in the United States included some significant events that pushed the nation closer towards civil war.

== Incumbents ==
=== Federal government ===
- President: Franklin Pierce (D-New Hampshire)
- Vice President: vacant
- Chief Justice: Roger B. Taney (Maryland)
- Speaker of the House of Representatives: Nathaniel P. Banks (American-Massachusetts)
- Congress: 34th

==== State governments ====
Governors and lieutenant governors

=== Governors ===
- Governor of Alabama: John A. Winston (Democratic)
- Governor of Arkansas: Elias Nelson Conway (Democratic)
- Governor of California: John Bigler (Democratic) (until January 9), J. Neely Johnson (Know Nothing) (starting January 9)
- Governor of Connecticut: William T. Minor (Know Nothing)
- Governor of Delaware: Peter F. Causey (Know Nothing)
- Governor of Florida: James E. Broome (Democratic)
- Governor of Georgia: Herschel V. Johnson (Democratic)
- Governor of Illinois: Joel Aldrich Matteson (Democratic)
- Governor of Indiana: Joseph A. Wright (Democratic)
- Governor of Iowa: James W. Grimes (Whig)
- Governor of Kentucky: Charles S. Morehead (Know Nothing)
- Governor of Louisiana: Paul Octave Hébert (Democratic) (until January 22), Robert C. Wickliffe (Democratic) (starting January 22)
- Governor of Maine: Anson Morrill (Republican) (until January 2), Samuel Wells (Democratic) (starting January 2)
- Governor of Maryland: Thomas W. Ligon (Democratic)
- Governor of Massachusetts: Henry Gardner (Know Nothing)
- Governor of Michigan: Kinsley S. Bingham (Republican)
- Governor of Mississippi: John J. McRae (Democratic)
- Governor of Missouri: Sterling Price (Democratic)
- Governor of New Hampshire: Ralph Metcalf (Know Nothing)
- Governor of New Jersey: Rodman M. Price (Democratic)
- Governor of New York: Myron H. Clark (Whig) (until end of December 31)
- Governor of North Carolina: Thomas Bragg (Democratic)
- Governor of Ohio: William Medill (Democratic) (until January 14), Salmon P. Chase (Republican) (starting January 14)
- Governor of Pennsylvania: James Pollock (Whig)
- Governor of Rhode Island: William W. Hoppin (Whig)
- Governor of South Carolina: James Hopkins Adams (Democratic) (until December 9), Robert Francis Withers Allston (Democratic) (starting December 9)
- Governor of Tennessee: Andrew Johnson (Democratic)
- Governor of Texas: Elisha M. Pease (Democratic)
- Governor of Vermont: Stephen Royce (Whig)/(Republican) (until October 10), Ryland Fletcher (Republican) (starting October 10)
- Governor of Virginia: Joseph Johnson (Democratic) (until January 1), Henry A. Wise (Democratic) (starting January 1)
- Governor of Wisconsin:
  - until March 21: William A. Barstow (Democratic)
  - March 21-March 25: Arthur MacArthur, Sr. (Democratic)
  - starting March 25: Coles Bashford (Republican)

=== Lieutenant governors ===
- Lieutenant Governor of California: Samuel Purdy (Democratic) (until January 9), Robert M. Anderson (Know Nothing) (starting January 9)
- Lieutenant Governor of Connecticut: William Field (Free Soil) (until month and day unknown), Albert Day (Free Soil) (starting month and day unknown)
- Lieutenant Governor of Illinois: Gustavus Koerner (Democratic)
- Lieutenant Governor of Indiana: Ashbel P. Willard (Democratic)
- Lieutenant Governor of Kentucky: James Greene Hardy (Know Nothing) (until month and day unknown), vacant (starting month and day unknown)
- Lieutenant Governor of Louisiana:
  - until January 22: Robert C. Wickliffe (Democratic)
  - January 22-month and day unknown: Charles Homer Mouton (Democratic)
  - starting month and day unknown: William F. Griffin (Democratic)
- Lieutenant Governor of Massachusetts: Simon Brown (political party unknown) (until month and day unknown), Henry W. Benchley (political party unknown) (starting month and day unknown)
- Lieutenant Governor of Michigan: George Coe (Republican)
- Lieutenant Governor of Missouri: vacant
- Lieutenant Governor of New York: Henry Jarvis Raymond (Whig) (until end of December 31)
- Lieutenant Governor of Ohio: James Myers (Democratic) (until January 14), Thomas H. Ford (Democratic) (starting January 14)
- Lieutenant Governor of Rhode Island: Anderson C. Rose (political party unknown) (until month and day unknown), Nicholas Brown III (political party unknown) (starting month and day unknown)
- Lieutenant Governor of South Carolina: Richard de Treville (Democratic) (until December 9), Gabriel Cannon (Democratic) (starting December 9)
- Lieutenant Governor of Texas: Hardin Richard Runnels (Democratic)
- Lieutenant Governor of Vermont: Ryland Fletcher (Republican) (until October 10), James M. Slade (Republican) (starting October 10)
- Lieutenant Governor of Virginia: Shelton Leake (Democratic) (until January 1), Elisha W. McComas (political party unknown) (starting January 1)
- Lieutenant Governor of Wisconsin: James T. Lewis (Republican) (until January 7), Arthur MacArthur, Sr. (Democratic) (starting January 7)

== Events ==
=== January–March ===
- January 24 – U.S. President Franklin Pierce declares the new Free-State Topeka government in Bleeding Kansas to be in rebellion.
- January 26 – Puget Sound War/Yakima War: Battle of Seattle – Marines from the USS Decatur drive off American Indian attackers after an all day battle with settlers.
- February – The Tintic War breaks out in Utah.
- February 1 – Auburn University is first chartered as the East Alabama Male College.
- February 2 – Dallas, Texas is incorporated as a city.
- February 12 – American clipper ships Driver and Ocean Queen leave Liverpool and London respectively; both will be lost without trace in the Atlantic, perhaps due to ice, killing 374 and 123 respectively.
- February 18 – The American Party (Know-Nothings) convene in Philadelphia, Pennsylvania to nominate their first presidential candidate, former President Millard Fillmore.
- March 6 – Maryland Agricultural College (present-day University of Maryland, College Park) is chartered.
- March 9 – National Fraternity Sigma Alpha Epsilon is founded at the University of Alabama in Tuscaloosa, Alabama.
- April 10 – The Theta Chi fraternity is founded at Norwich University.

=== April–June ===
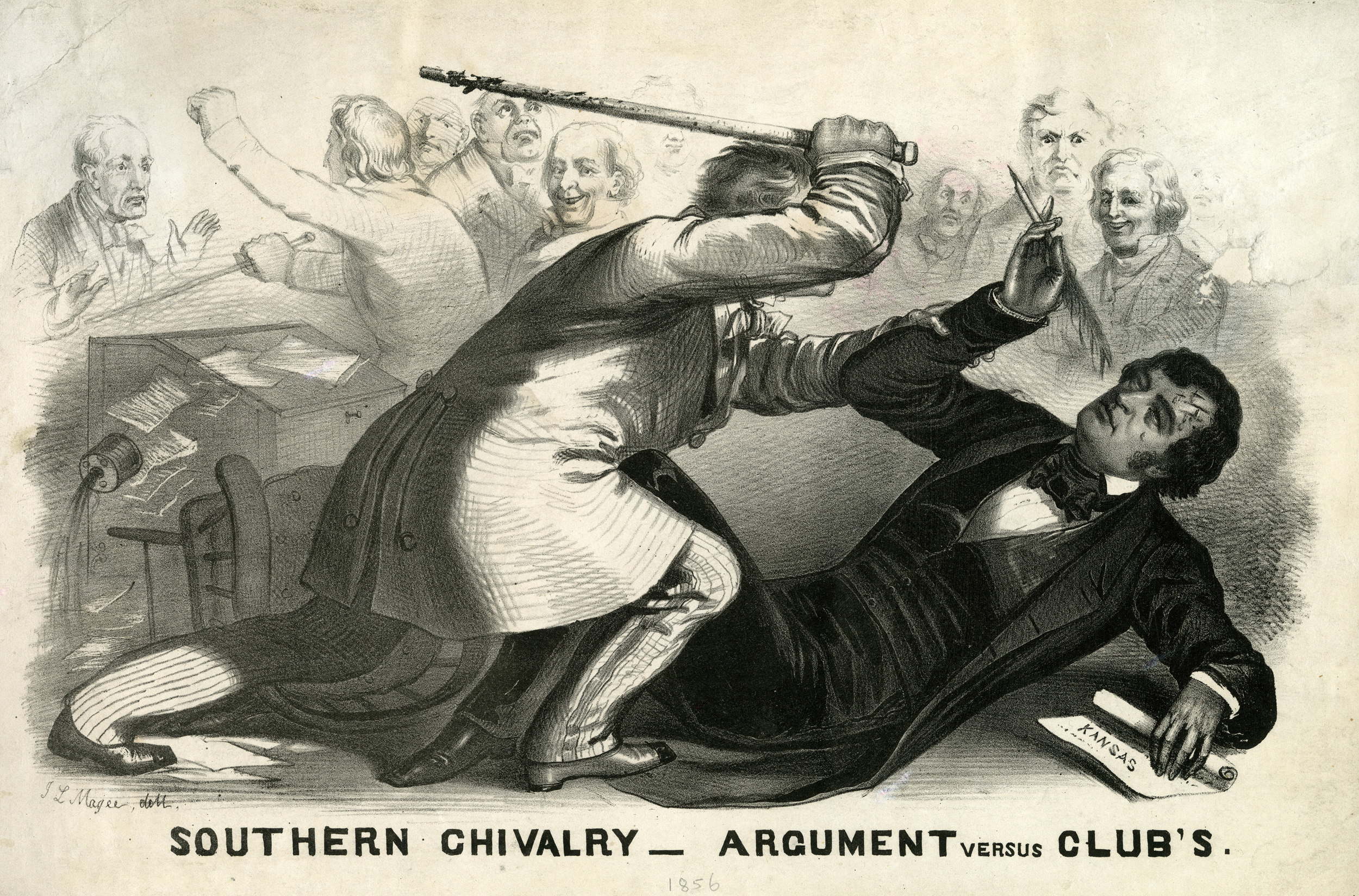
May 22: Preston Brooks attacks Charles Sumner.

- May 16 – The Vigilance Committee is founded in San Francisco, California. It lynches two gangsters, arrests most Democratic Party officials and disbands itself on August 18.
- May 21 – Bleeding Kansas: Lawrence, Kansas is captured and burned by pro-slavery forces (the "Sacking of Lawrence").
- May 22 – Congressman Preston Brooks of South Carolina beats Senator Charles Sumner of Massachusetts with a cane in the hall of the United States Senate, for a speech Sumner had made attacking Southerners who sympathized with the pro-slavery violence in Kansas ("Bleeding Kansas"). Sumner is unable to return to duty for 3 years while he recovers; Brooks becomes a hero across the South.
- May 24 – Pottawatomie Massacre: A group of followers of radical abolitionist John Brown kill 5 pro-slavery supporters in Franklin County, Kansas.
- June 2 – Bleeding Kansas: Battle of Black Jack – Anti-slavery forces, led by John Brown, defeat pro-slavery forces.
- June 6 – At the Democratic National Convention, President Franklin Pierce is denied re-nomination for the November presidential election.
- June 9 – 500 Mormons leave Iowa City, Iowa and head west for Salt Lake City, Utah, carrying all their possessions in two-wheeled handcarts.

=== July–September ===
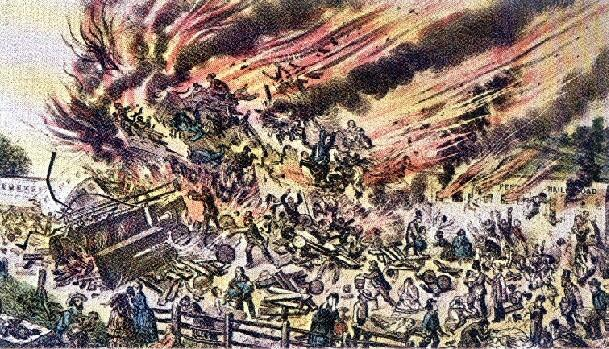
July 17: The Great Train Wreck of 1856.

- July 17 – The Great Train Wreck of 1856: Two trains collide near Philadelphia, Pennsylvania killing at least 59 and injuring at least 100.
- August 10 – 1856 Last Island hurricane: A hurricane destroys Last Island, Louisiana, leaving at least 200 dead. The whole island is broken up into smaller islands by the storm.
- August 21 – The Charter Oak in Hartford, Connecticut, falls to the ground during a storm
- August 23 – Kate Warne, the first female private detective, begins to work for the Pinkerton Detective Agency.
- August 30
  - Bleeding Kansas: Battle of Osawatomie – Pro-slavery forces defeat anti-slavery forces.
  - Chickasaw Constitution signed; establishes new Chickasaw Nation in Indian Territory.
- September 1 – Seton Hall University is founded by Archdiocese of Newark Bishop James Roosevelt Bayley, a cousin of U.S. President Theodore Roosevelt and nephew of Saint Elizabeth Ann Seton.

=== October–December ===
- November 4 – 1856 United States presidential election: Democrat James Buchanan defeats former President Millard Fillmore, representing a coalition of "Know Nothings" and Whigs, and John C. Frémont of the fledgling Republican Party, to become the 15th president of the United States.
- November 17 – American Old West: On the Sonoita River in present-day southern Arizona, the United States Army establishes Fort Buchanan in order to help control new land acquired in the Gadsden Purchase.
- November 21 – Niagara University is founded in Niagara Falls, New York.

=== Ongoing ===
- Bleeding Kansas (1854–1860)
- Third Seminole War (1855–1858)

== Births ==
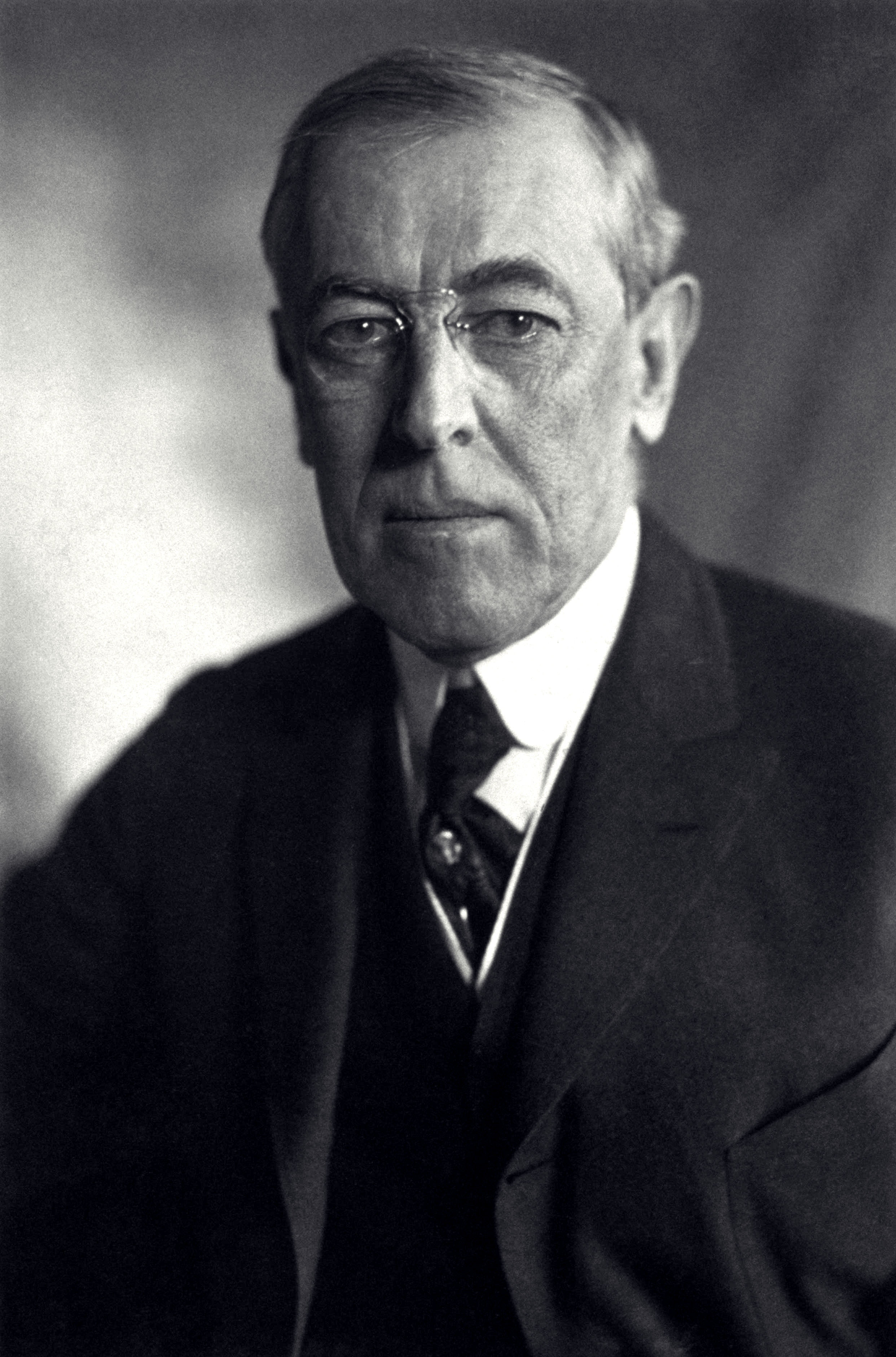
Woodrow Wilson

- January 7 – Charles Harold Davis, landscape painter (died 1933)
- January 8 – Elizabeth Taylor, painter and traveler (died 1932)
- January 9 – Lizette Woodworth Reese, poet (died 1935)
- January 12 – John Singer Sargent, painter (born in Tuscany; died 1925 in the United Kingdom)
- February 2 – Frederick William Vanderbilt, railroad magnate (died 1938)
- March 20 – Frederick Winslow Taylor, inventor and efficiency expert (died 1915)
- April 5 – Booker T. Washington, educator (died 1915)
- April 23 – Granville T. Woods, African American inventor (died 1910)
- March 8 – Colin Campbell Cooper, impressionist painter (died 1937)
- May 6 – Robert Peary, Arctic explorer (died 1920)
- May 15 – L. Frank Baum, children's writer (The Wizard of Oz) (died 1919)
- May 26 – George Templeton Strong, composer (died 1948 in Switzerland)
- July 9/10 – Nikola Tesla inventor, genius (died in 1947 in New York, United States)
- July 11 – Georgiana Drew, stage actress (died 1893)
- July 24 – Franklin Ware Mann, inventor (died 1916)
- July 25 – Charles Major, novelist and lawyer (died 1913)
- August 15 – Charles E. Townsend, U.S. Senator from Michigan from 1911 to 1923 (died 1924)
- September 3 –Louis Sullivan, architect, "father of skyscrapers" (died 1924)
- September 5
  - William B. McKinley, U.S. Senator from Illinois from 1921 to 1926 (died 1926)
  - Thomas E. Watson, U.S. Senator from Georgia from 1921 to 1922 (died 1922)
- September 9 – Richard R. Kenney, U.S. Senator from Delaware from 1897 to 1901 (died 1931)
- October 7 – Moses Fleetwood Walker, baseball pitcher and Black nationalist (died 1924)
- October 10 – George McClellan, U.S. Representative from New York (died 1927)
- October 28 – Anna Elizabeth Klumpke, portrait and genre painter (died 1942)
- October 30 – Charles Leroux, balloonist and parachutist (died 1889)
- November 6 – Jefferson David Chalfant, trompe-l'œil painter (died 1931)
- November 13 – Louis Brandeis, U.S. Supreme Court Justice (died 1941)
- November 14 – Madeleine Lemoyne Ellicott, suffragette (died 1945)
- November 16 – Carrie Babcock Sherman, wife of James S. Sherman, Second Lady of the United States (died 1931)
- November 17 – Thomas Taggart, U.S. Senator from Indiana in 1916 (died 1929)
- November 21 – William Emerson Ritter, biologist (died 1944)
- November 22 – Heber J. Grant, seventh president of the Church of Jesus Christ of Latter-day Saints (died 1945)
- December 18 – Ella Holmes White, survivor of the sinking of the Titanic (died 1942)
- December 22 – Frank B. Kellogg, U.S. Senator from Minnesota from 1917 to 1923 (died 1937)
- December 23 – James Buchanan Duke, tobacco and electric power industrialist (born 1925)
- December 28
  - Woodrow Wilson, 28th president of the United States from 1913 to 1921 (died 1924)
  - Sarah Platt-Decker, née Chase, suffragist (died 1912)

== Deaths ==
- January 1 – John M. Berrien, U.S. Senator from Georgia from 1841 to 1852 (born 1781)
- January 16 –Thaddeus William Harris, naturalist (born 1795)
- April 19 – Thomas Rogers, railroad locomotive builder (born 1792)
- April 20 – Robert L. Stevens, president of Camden and Amboy Railroad (born 1787)
- April 26 – George Troup, U.S. Senator from Georgia from 1816 to 1818 and 1829 to 1833 (born 1780)
- May 5 – William Crosby Dawson, U.S. Senator from Georgia from 1849 to 1855 (born 1798)
- May 31 – John Milton Niles, U.S. Senator from Connecticut from 1835 to 1839 and 1843 to 1849 (born 1787)
- July 9
  - Alfred Cuthbert, U.S. Senator from Georgia from 1835 to 1843 (born 1785)
  - James Strang, Mormon splinter group leader (born 1813)
- September 7 – Almon W. Babbitt, Mormon pioneer and first secretary/treasurer of Utah Territory (born 1812)
- October 19 – William Sprague III, politician from Rhode Island (born 1799)
- November 9 – John M. Clayton, U.S. Senator from Delaware from 1829 to 1836, 1845 to 1849 and 1853 to 1856 (born 1796)

== See also ==
- Timeline of United States history (1820–1859)
