= 1858 in the United States =

- Decades: 1830s; 1840s; 1850s; 1860s; 1870s
- See also: History of the United States (1849–1865); Timeline of United States history (1820–1859); List of years in the United States

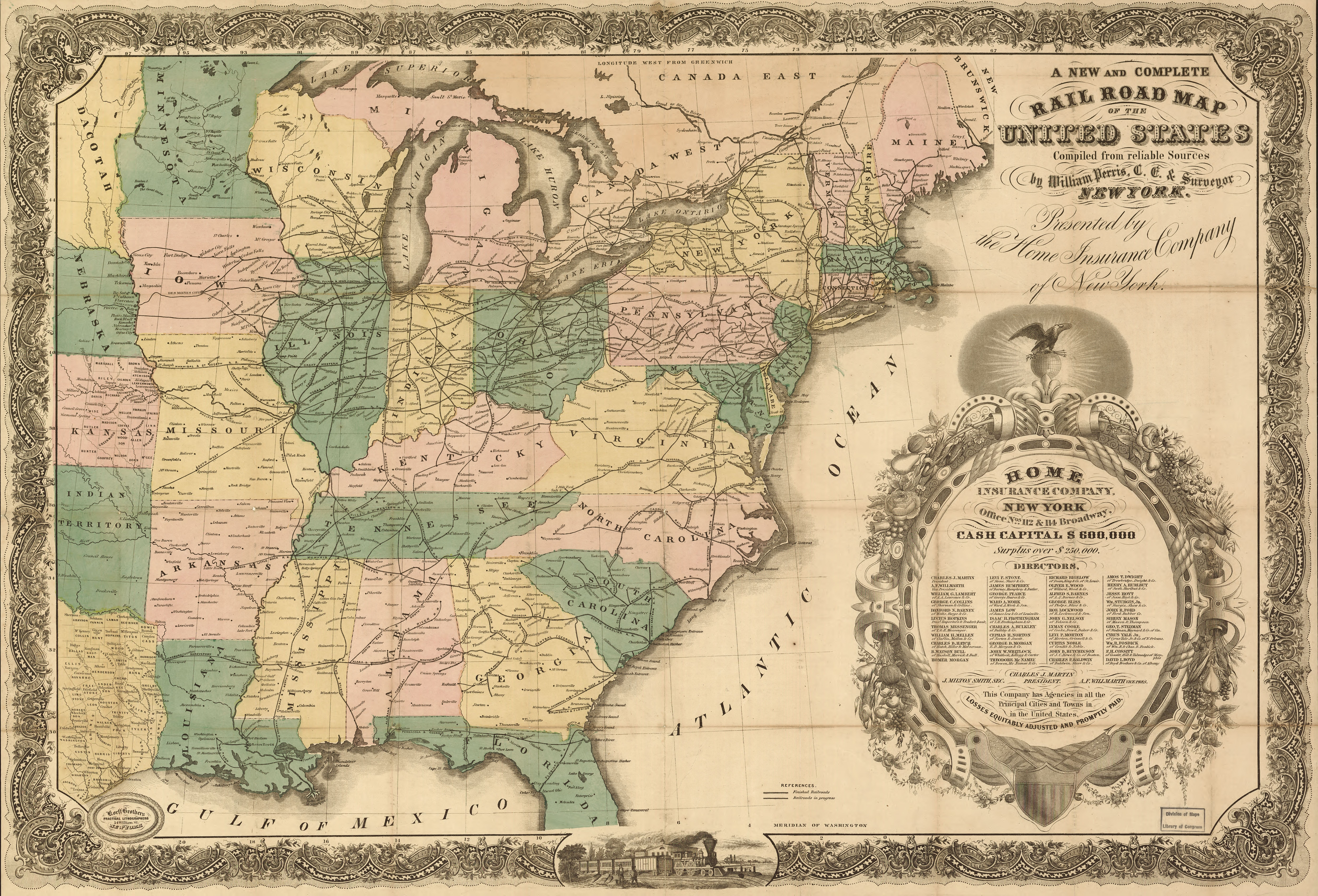
A new and complete rail road map of the United States (1858)

Events from the year 1858 in the United States.

== Incumbents ==
=== Federal government ===
- President: James Buchanan (D-Pennsylvania)
- Vice President: John C. Breckinridge (D-Kentucky)
- Chief Justice: Roger B. Taney (Maryland)
- Speaker of the House of Representatives: James Lawrence Orr (D-South Carolina)
- Congress: 35th

==== State governments ====
Governors and lieutenant governors

=== Governors ===
- Governor of Alabama: Andrew B. Moore (Democratic)
- Governor of Arkansas: Elias Nelson Conway (Democratic)
- Governor of California: J. Neely Johnson (Know Nothing) (until January 8), John B. Weller (Democratic) (starting January 8)
- Governor of Connecticut: Alexander H. Holley (Republican) (until May 5), William A. Buckingham (Republican) (starting May 5)
- Governor of Delaware: Peter F. Causey (Know Nothing)
- Governor of Florida: Madison S. Perry (Democratic)
- Governor of Georgia: Joseph E. Brown (Democratic)
- Governor of Illinois: William Henry Bissell (Republican)
- Governor of Indiana: Ashbel P. Willard (Democratic)
- Governor of Iowa: James W. Grimes (Whig) (until January 13), Ralph P. Lowe (Republican) (starting January 13)
- Governor of Kentucky: Charles S. Morehead (Know Nothing)
- Governor of Louisiana: Robert C. Wickliffe (Democratic)
- Governor of Maine: Joseph H. Williams (Republican) (until January 6), Lot M. Morrill (Democratic) (starting January 6)
- Governor of Maryland: Thomas W. Ligon (Democratic) (until January 13), Thomas H. Hicks (Know Nothing)/(Republican) (starting January 13)
- Governor of Massachusetts: Henry Gardner (Know Nothing) (until January 7), Nathaniel Prentice Banks (Republican) (starting January 7)
- Governor of Michigan: Kinsley S. Bingham (Republican)
- Governor of Minnesota: Samuel Medary (Democratic) (until May 24), Henry H. Sibley (Democratic) (starting May 24)
- Governor of Mississippi: William McWillie (Democratic)
- Governor of Missouri: Robert Marcellus Stewart (Democratic)
- Governor of New Hampshire: William Haile (Republican)
- Governor of New Jersey: William A. Newell (Republican)
- Governor of New York: John Alsop King (Republican) (until end of December 31)
- Governor of North Carolina: Thomas Bragg (Democratic)
- Governor of Ohio: Salmon P. Chase (Republican)
- Governor of Pennsylvania: James Pollock (Whig) (until January 19), William F. Packer (Democratic) (starting January 19)
- Governor of Rhode Island: Elisha Dyer (Republican)
- Governor of South Carolina: Robert Francis Withers Allston (Democratic) (until December 10), William Henry Gist (Democratic) (starting December 10)
- Governor of Tennessee: Isham G. Harris (Democratic)
- Governor of Texas: Hardin R. Runnels (Democratic)
- Governor of Vermont: Ryland Fletcher (Republican) (until October 10), Hiland Hall (Republican) (starting October 10)
- Governor of Virginia: Henry A. Wise (Democratic)
- Governor of Wisconsin: Coles Bashford (Republican) (until January 4), Alexander W. Randall (Republican) (starting January 12)

=== Lieutenant governors ===
- Lieutenant Governor of California: Robert M. Anderson (Know Nothing) (until month and day unknown), John Walkup (Democratic) (starting month and day unknown)
- Lieutenant Governor of Connecticut: Alfred A. Burnham (Republican) (until May 5), Julius Catlin (Republican) (starting May 5)
- Lieutenant Governor of Illinois: John Wood (Republican)
- Lieutenant Governor of Indiana: Abram A. Hammond (Democratic)
- Lieutenant Governor of Iowa: Oran Faville (Republican) (starting month and day unknown)
- Lieutenant Governor of Kentucky: vacant
- Lieutenant Governor of Louisiana: William F. Griffin (Democratic)
- Lieutenant Governor of Massachusetts: Henry W. Benchley (Republican) (until January 7), Eliphalet Trask (Republican) (starting January 7)
- Lieutenant Governor of Michigan: George Coe (Republican)
- Lieutenant Governor of Minnesota: William Holcombe (Democratic) (starting May 24)
- Lieutenant Governor of Missouri: Hancock Lee Jackson (Democratic)
- Lieutenant Governor of New York: Henry R. Selden (Republican) (until end of December 31)
- Lieutenant Governor of Ohio: Thomas H. Ford (Democratic) (until January 11), Martin Welker (Democratic) (starting January 11)
- Lieutenant Governor of Rhode Island: Thomas G. Turner (political party unknown)
- Lieutenant Governor of South Carolina: Gabriel Cannon (Democratic) (until December 10), M. E. Carn (Democratic) (starting December 10)
- Lieutenant Governor of Texas: Francis R. Lubbock (Democratic)
- Lieutenant Governor of Vermont: James M. Slade (Republican) (until October 10), Burnham Martin (Republican) (starting October 10)
- Lieutenant Governor of Virginia: William Lowther Jackson (Democratic)
- Lieutenant Governor of Wisconsin: Arthur MacArthur, Sr. (Democratic) (until January 4), Erasmus D. Campbell (Democratic) (starting January 4)

== Events ==
- February 6 – A fight, the 1858 Congressional brawl, breaks out on the floor of the U.S. House between Representatives of the Northern and Southern states.
- March 4 – A speech by fire-eater James Henry Hammond of South Carolina in the United States Senate promotes the idea of "King Cotton" and the "mudsill theory" in support of slave labor.
- April 19 – The United States and the Yankton Sioux Tribe sign a treaty.
- May 11 – Minnesota is admitted as the 32nd U.S. state (see History of Minnesota).
- May 19 – The Marais des Cygnes massacre is perpetrated by pro-slavery forces in Bleeding Kansas.
- June 16 – Abraham Lincoln makes his "House Divided" Speech at the State Capitol in Springfield, Illinois, on accepting the Republican Party nomination for a seat in the U.S. Senate.
- July – Forty-Niners stream into the Rocky Mountains of the western United States during the Pike's Peak Gold Rush.
- July 8 – The Paulist Fathers, a Roman Catholic society of apostolic life for men, is founded in New York City by Isaac Hecker.
- July 29 – Treaty of Amity and Commerce (United States–Japan) ("Harris Treaty") signed on the deck of USS Powhatan in Edo (modern-day Tokyo) Bay.
- August 16 – U.S. President James Buchanan inaugurates the new trans-Atlantic telegraph cable by exchanging greetings with Queen Victoria. However, a weak signal forces a shutdown of the service on September 1.
- August 21 – The first of the seven Lincoln–Douglas debates is held.
- September 1–2 – Staten Island Quarantine War
- September 14 – Fordyce Beals patents his six shooter revolver which will be produced by E. Remington & Sons of Ilion, New York as the Remington Model 1858.
- November 17 – Denver is founded.
- November 28 – At Jekyll Island, Georgia, the Wanderer illegally lands 400 slaves purchased from traders at the mouth of the Congo River.
- December 8 – Rensselaer, Indiana is incorporated.

=== Ongoing ===
- Abraham Lincoln and others observe Comet Donati.
- Bleeding Kansas (1854–1860)
- Third Seminole War (1855–1858)
- Utah War (1857–1858)

== Births ==
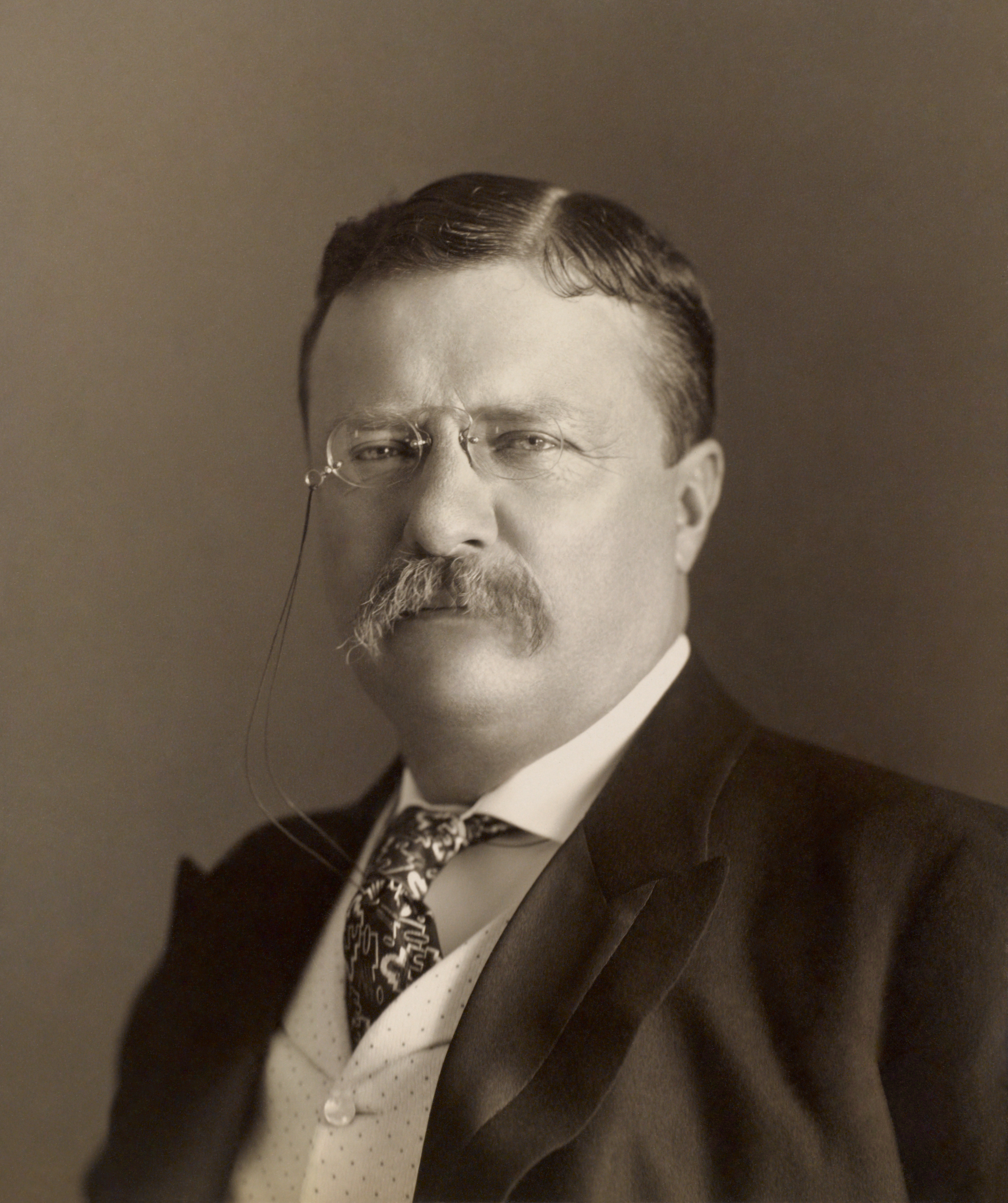
Theodore Roosevelt

- January 6 – Albert Henry Munsell, painter, teacher of art and inventor of the Munsell color system (died 1918)
- January 9 – Elizabeth Gertrude Britton, botanist (died 1934)
- January 11 – Harry Gordon Selfridge, department store magnate (died 1947)
- February 6 – Jonathan P. Dolliver, U.S. Senator from Iowa from 1900 to 1910 (died 1910)
- February 15 – John Joseph Montgomery, glider pioneer (died 1911)
- February 19 – Charles Alexander Eastman, Native American author, physician, reformer and co-founder of Boy Scouts of America (died 1939)
- February 28 – Richard P. Ernst, U.S. Senator from Kentucky from 1921 to 1927 (died 1934)
- March 9 – Gustav Stickley, furniture designer and architect (died 1942)
- March 12 – Adolph Ochs, newspaper publisher (died 1935)
- March 24 – Elia Goode Byington, newspaper proprietor, editor, and manager (died 1936)
- March 30 – DeWolf Hopper, musical theater performer (died 1935)
- April 23 – Leonor F. Loree, railroad executive (died 1940)
- April 29 – Georgia Hopley, journalist, political figure and temperance advocate (died 1944)
- June 17 – Mary F. Hoyt, first woman appointed to the U.S. federal civil service, in 1883 (died 1958)
- June 20 – Charles Waddell Chesnutt, African American author, essayist and political activist (died 1932)
- June 28 – Otis Skinner, actor (died 1943)
- July 1 – Velma Caldwell Melville, editor and writer (died 1924)
- August 18 – Thomas S. Rodgers, admiral (died 1931)
- September 1 – Andrew Jackson Zilker, philanthropist (died 1934)
- September 12 – J. H. Smith, politician and pioneer (died 1956)
- September 30 – Estelle M. H. Merrill, journalist (died 1908)
- October 2 – Emma Amelia Cranmer, prohibition reformer and suffragist (died 1937)
- October 7 – Joseph E. Ransdell, U.S. Senator from Louisiana from 1913 to 1931 (died 1954)
- October 12 – John L. Sullivan, heavyweight boxer (died 1918)
- October 15 – William Sims, admiral (died 1936)
- October 27 – Theodore Roosevelt, 26th president of the United States from 1901 to 1909, 25th vice president of the United States from March to September 1901 (died 1919)
- October 30 – Wilson Eyre, architect (died 1944)
- November 8 – Lawrence Yates Sherman, U.S. Senator from Illinois from 1913 to 1921 (died 1939)
- November 21 – Charles A. Towne, U.S. Senator from Minnesota from 1900 to 1901 (died 1928)
- November 26 – Katharine Drexel, Roman Catholic foundress, first American canonized as a saint, in 2000 (died 1955)
- December 15 – Elizabeth Eggleston Seelye, biographer (died 1923)
- December 24 – Harriet Pritchard Arnold, author (died 1901)
- December 25 – Herman P. Faris, temperance movement leader (died 1936)
- December 31 – Harry Stewart New, U.S. Senator from Indiana from 1917 to 1923 (died 1937)
- Unknown – Sarah Jim Mayo, Washoe basket weaver (died 1918)

== Deaths ==
- January 10 – Hezekiah Augur, sculptor and inventor (born 1791)
- March 4 – Commodore Matthew Calbraith Perry, naval officer (born 1794)
- April 10 – Thomas Hart Benton, U.S. Senator from Missouri from 1821 to 1851 (born 1782)
- August 23 – Calvin Willey, U.S. Senator from Connecticut from 1825 to 1831 (born 1776)
- August 31 – Chief Oshkosh of the Menominee (Mamaceqtaw) killed in a fight with his sons in Wisconsin (born c. 1795)
- September 17 – Dred Scott, slave (born c. 1795)
- September 21 – Arthur P. Bagby, U.S. Senator from Alabama from 1837 to 1841 (born 1794)
- November 16 – Robert Hanna, U.S. Senator from Indiana from 1831 to 1832 (born 1786)
- December 14 – Michael Woolston Ash, U.S. Representative from Pennsylvania from 1835 to 1837 (born 1789)
- December 18 – Thomas Holley Chivers, poet and physician (born 1809)

== See also ==
- Timeline of United States history (1820–1859)
