= 1853 in the United States =

- Decades: 1830s; 1840s; 1850s; 1860s; 1870s
- See also: History of the United States (1849–1865); Timeline of United States history (1820–1859); List of years in the United States

Events from the year 1853 in the United States.

== Incumbents ==
=== Federal government ===
- President:

Millard Fillmore (W-New York) (until March 4)
Franklin Pierce (D-New Hampshire) (starting March 4)

- Vice President:

vacant (until March 4)
William R. King (D-Alabama) (March 4 – April 18)
vacant (starting April 18)

- Chief Justice: Roger B. Taney (Maryland)
- Speaker of the House of Representatives: Linn Boyd (D-Kentucky)
- Congress: 32nd (until March 4), 33rd (starting March 4)

==== State governments ====
Governors and lieutenant governors

=== Governors ===
- Governor of Alabama: Henry W. Collier (Democratic) (until December 20), John A. Winston (Democratic) (starting December 20)
- Governor of Arkansas: Elias Nelson Conway (Democratic)
- Governor of California: John Bigler (Democratic)
- Governor of Connecticut: Thomas H. Seymour (Democratic) (until October 13), Charles H. Pond (Democratic) (starting October 13)
- Governor of Delaware: William H. H. Ross (Democratic)
- Governor of Florida: Thomas Brown (Whig) (until October 3), James E. Broome (Democratic) (starting October 3)
- Governor of Georgia: Howell Cobb (Democratic) (until November 9), Herschel V. Johnson (Democratic) (starting November 9)
- Governor of Illinois: Augustus C. French (Democratic) (until January 10), Joel Aldrich Matteson (Democratic) (starting January 10)
- Governor of Indiana: Joseph A. Wright (Democratic)
- Governor of Iowa: Stephen P. Hempstead (Democratic)
- Governor of Kentucky: Lazarus W. Powell (Democratic)
- Governor of Louisiana: Joseph Marshall Walker (Democratic) (until January 18), Paul Octave Hébert (Democratic) (starting January 18)
- Governor of Maine: John Hubbard (Democratic) (until January 10), William G. Crosby (Whig) (starting January 10)
- Governor of Maryland: Enoch Louis Lowe (Democratic)
- Governor of Massachusetts: George S. Boutwell (Democratic) (until January 14), John H. Clifford (Whig) (starting January 14)
- Governor of Michigan:
  - until March 7: Robert McClelland (Democratic)
  - March 7-8: vacant
  - starting March 8: Andrew Parsons (Democratic)
- Governor of Mississippi: Henry S. Foote (Democratic)
- Governor of Missouri: Austin Augustus King (Democratic) (until January 3), Sterling Price (Democratic) (starting January 3)
- Governor of New Hampshire: Noah Martin (Democratic)
- Governor of New Jersey: George F. Fort (Democratic)
- Governor of New York: Horatio Seymour (Democratic) (starting January 1)
- Governor of North Carolina: David Settle Reid (Democratic)
- Governor of Ohio: Reuben Wood (Democratic) (until July 13), William Medill (Democratic) (starting July 13)
- Governor of Pennsylvania: William Bigler (Democratic)
- Governor of Rhode Island: Philip Allen (Democratic) (until July 20), Francis M. Dimond (Democratic) (starting July 20)
- Governor of South Carolina: John Lawrence Manning (Democratic)
- Governor of Tennessee: William B. Campbell (Whig) (until October 17), Andrew Johnson (Democratic) (starting October 17)
- Governor of Texas:
  - until November 23: Peter Hansborough Bell (Democratic)
  - November 23-December 21: James W. Henderson (Democratic)
  - starting December 21: Elisha M. Pease (Democratic)
- Governor of Vermont: Erastus Fairbanks (Whig) (until October), John S. Robinson (Democratic) (starting October)
- Governor of Virginia: Joseph Johnson (Democratic)
- Governor of Wisconsin: Leonard J. Farwell (Whig)

=== Lieutenant governors ===
- Lieutenant Governor of California: Samuel Purdy (Democratic)
- Lieutenant Governor of Connecticut: Charles H. Pond (Democratic) (until October 13), vacant (starting October 13)
- Lieutenant Governor of Illinois: William McMurtry (Democratic) (until January 10), Gustavus Koerner (Democratic) (starting January 10)
- Lieutenant Governor of Indiana: James H. Lane (Democratic) (until January 10), Ashbel P. Willard (Democratic) (starting January 10)
- Lieutenant Governor of Kentucky: John Burton Thompson (political party unknown) (until month and day unknown), vacant (starting month and day unknown)
- Lieutenant Governor of Louisiana: Jean Baptiste Plauche (Whig) (until month and day unknown), William Wood Farmer (Democratic) (starting month and day unknown)
- Lieutenant Governor of Massachusetts: Henry W. Cushman (Democratic) (until January 14), Elisha Huntington (Whig) (starting January 14)
- Lieutenant Governor of Michigan:
  - until month and day unknown: Calvin Britain (Democratic)
  - month and day unknown: Andrew Parsons (Democratic)
  - starting month and day unknown: George Griswold (Democratic)
- Lieutenant Governor of Missouri: Thomas Lawson Price (Democratic) (until January 3), Wilson Brown (Democratic) (starting January 3)
- Lieutenant Governor of New York: Sanford E. Church (Democratic)
- Lieutenant Governor of Ohio: William Medill (Democratic) (until July 13), vacant (starting July 13)
- Lieutenant Governor of Rhode Island: Samuel G. Arnold (political party unknown) (until July 20), Francis M. Dimond (Democratic) (starting July 20)
- Lieutenant Governor of South Carolina: James Irby (Democratic)
- Lieutenant Governor of Texas:
  - until November 23: James Wilson Henderson (Democratic)
  - November 23-December 21: vacant
  - starting December 21: David Catchings Dickson (Democratic)
- Lieutenant Governor of Vermont: William Kittredge (Whig) (until October), Jefferson P. Kidder (Democratic) (starting October)
- Lieutenant Governor of Virginia: Shelton Leake (Democratic)
- Lieutenant Governor of Wisconsin: Timothy Burns (Democratic) (until September 21), vacant (starting September 21)

== Events ==
=== January–March ===
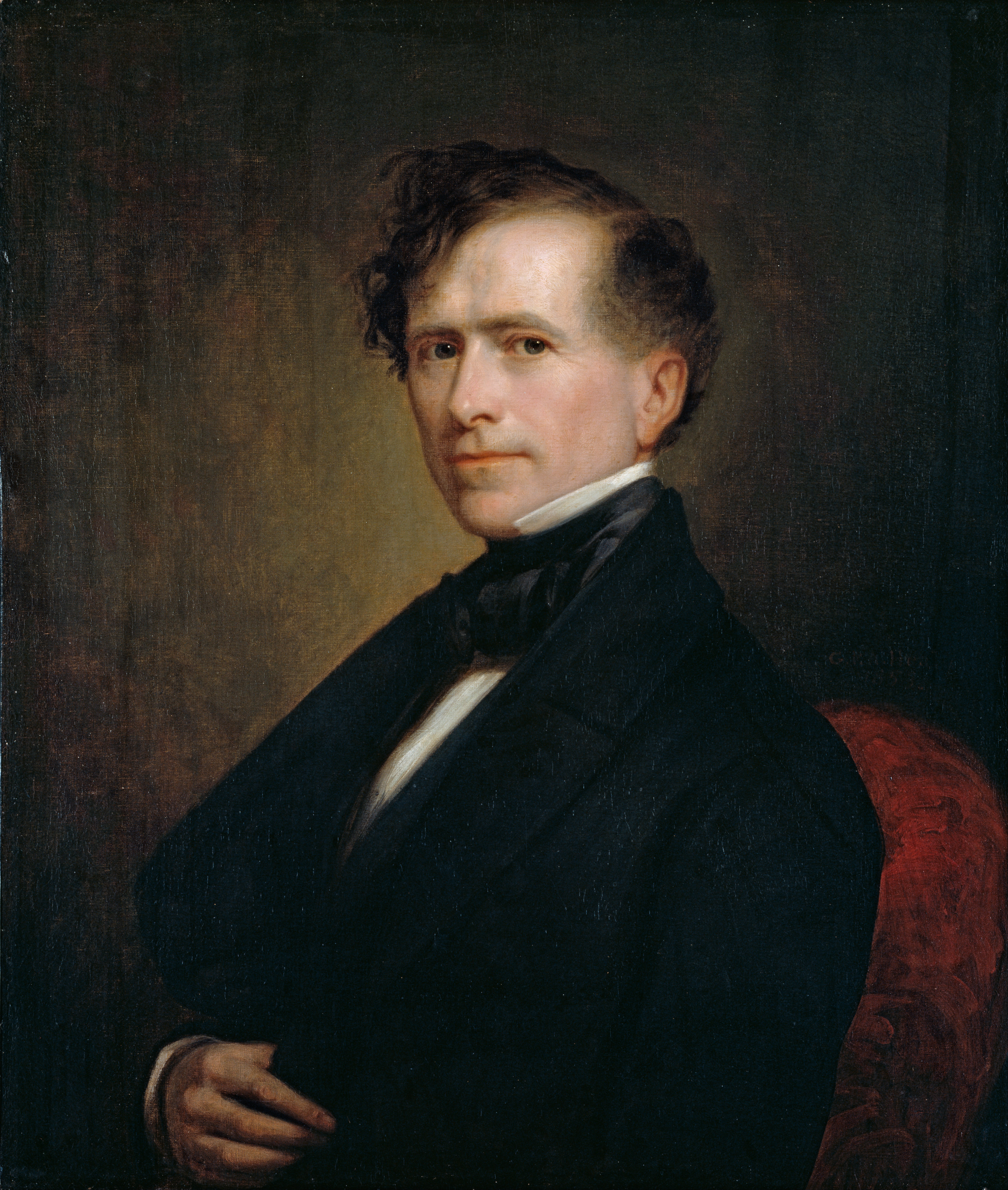
March 4: Franklin Pierce becomes the 14th U.S. president

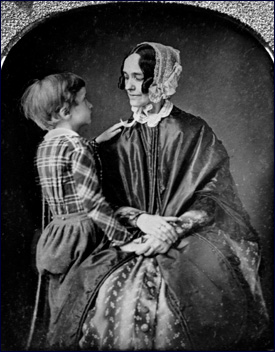
The president's wife, Jane, with their son Bennie, ca. 1850

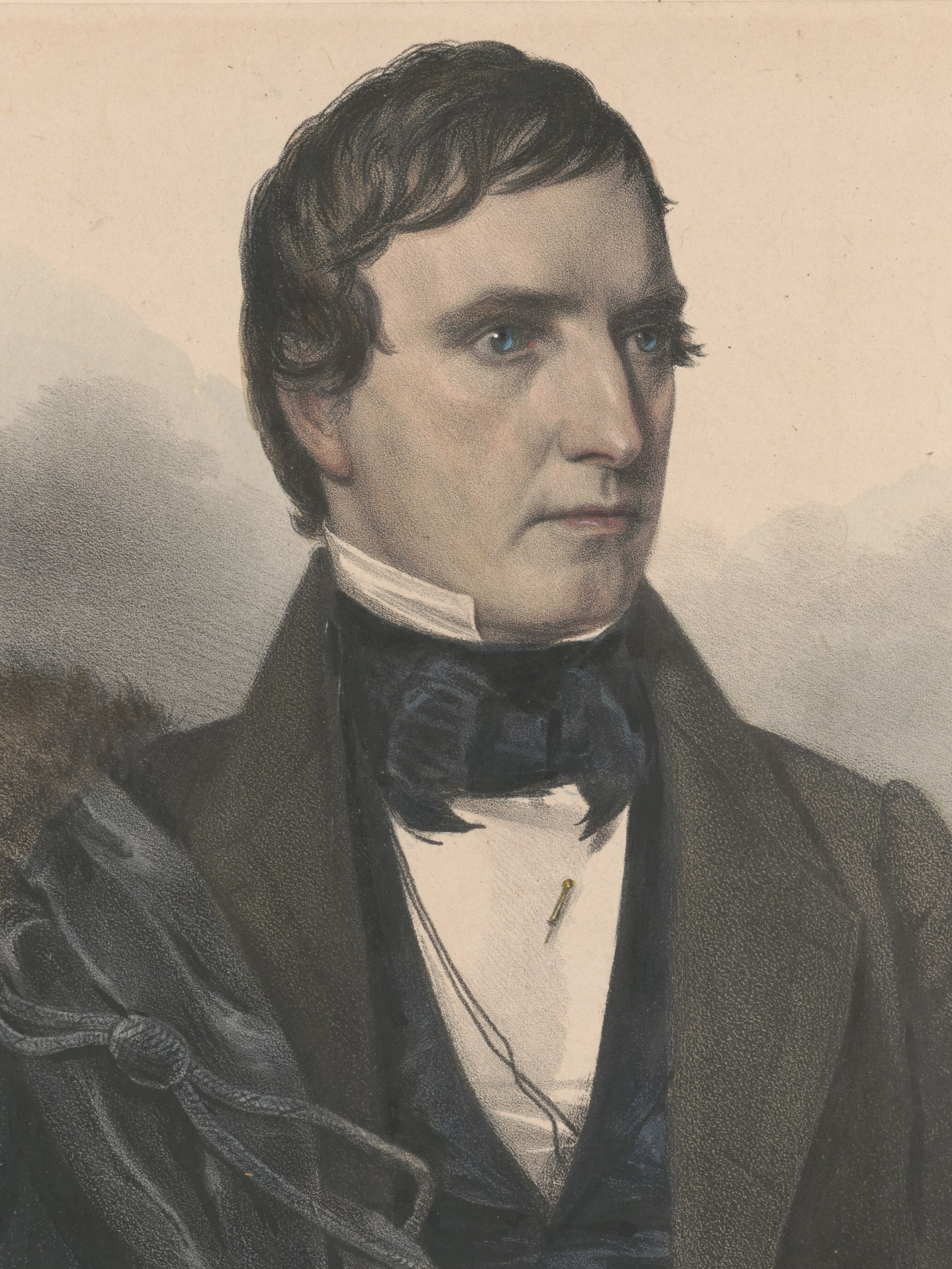
William R. King becomes the 13th U.S. vice president and dies shortly thereafter

- January – Stephen Foster's "My Old Kentucky Home, Good Night", which is later adopted as the state song of Kentucky under the name "My Old Kentucky Home", is published by Firth, Pond, & Company.
- January 6
  - President-elect Franklin Pierce and his family are involved in a train wreck near Andover, Massachusetts. Pierce's 11-year-old son Benjamin is killed in the crash.
  - East Florida Seminary is established; it is the oldest institution of what later becomes the University of Florida.
- February 22 – Washington University in St. Louis is founded as Eliot Seminary.
- March – Levi Strauss & Co. is founded in San Francisco, California.
- March 2 – Washington Territory is created from Oregon Territory.
- March 4 – Franklin Pierce becomes the 14th president of the United States, affirming the oath of office, and William R. King becomes the 13th vice president.
- March 5 – Steinway & Sons, a piano maker, is founded in Manhattan by the German immigrant Henry E. Steinway (Heinrich E. Steinweg) and his family.

=== April–June ===
- April 4 – Regular operation of the St. Lawrence and Atlantic Railroad begins between Montreal and Portland, Maine.
- April 18 – Vice President William R. King dies of tuberculosis in Selma, Alabama, without having carried out any duties of the office.
- May – The 1853 yellow fever epidemic begins along the Gulf Coast, ultimately killing more than 10,000 people.
- May 6 – Norwalk rail accident: A train runs off an open swing bridge into a river in Norwalk, Connecticut, killing 56.
- May 11 – Shimer College is founded in Mount Carroll, Illinois, with 11 students.
- May 23 – The first plat for Seattle, Washington, is laid out.

=== July–September ===
- July 1 – The Latting Observatory is opened for selected guests in New York City as part of the Exhibition of the Industry of All Nations. It is the tallest structure in the city at the time.
- July 2 – Koszta Affair: American Captain Duncan Ingraham commanding the USS St. Louis threatens to open fire upon an Austrian ship holding Martin Koszta as a prisoner. Koszta, who is in the process of obtaining American citizenship, is later returned to the U.S.
- July 8 – U.S. Commodore Matthew Perry arrives in Edo Bay with a request for a trade treaty.
- July 14 – The Exhibition of the Industry of All Nations world's fair begins in New York City.
- July 25 – Outlaw and bandit Joaquin Murrieta is killed in California.
- August 24 – Potato chips are traditionally said to have been invented on this date by George Crum in Saratoga Springs, New York.

=== October–December ===
December 30: Gadsden Purchase (in yellow)

- October 4 – The Great Republic, the largest wooden clipper ship ever constructed, is launched in Boston by Donald McKay.
- October 15 – William Walker sets out with 45 men to conquer the Mexican territories of Baja California and Sonora.
- November 11 – Voters in Massachusetts reject all eight proposals from the state's Constitutional Convention that was held from May 4 to August 2.
- December 7 – Erie Gauge War: Citizens of the Erie, Pennsylvania, area act to stop new track being laid to resolve rail gauge differences coming from neighboring Ohio and New York.
- December 25 – Cincinnati riot of 1853: Cardinal Gaetano Bedini's visit to Cincinnati, Ohio, sparks a Christmas Day protest that leads to the death of a protester in brawl with police.
- December 30 – Gadsden Purchase: U.S. Ambassador James Gadsden signs a treaty to buy approximately 29,600 sq mi (77,000 km^{2}) of land south of the Gila River and west of the Rio Grande from Mexico to facilitate railroad building in the Southwest.

=== Undated ===
- Yontoket massacre: More than 450 Tolowa people are killed at Yontocket, California, by a citizen militia from Crescent City.
- The high school known as the Wheaton Academy is founded in West Chicago, Illinois.

=== Ongoing ===
- California Gold Rush (1848–1855)

== Births ==
- January 1 – Harry A. Richardson, U.S. Senator from Delaware from 1907 to 1913 (died 1928)
- January 2 – Packy Dillon, baseball player (died 1902)
- January 6 – Woodbridge N. Ferris, 28th Governor of Michigan from 1913 to 1917 and U.S. Senator from Michigan from 1923 to 1928 (died 1928)
- January 17 – Alva Belmont, multi-millionaire socialite and suffrage activist (died 1933)
- January 19 – Stephen M. White, U.S. Senator from California from 1893 to 1899 (died 1901)
- February 3 – Hudson Maxim, inventor, chemist (died 1927)
- February 16 – Charles J. Hughes, Jr., U.S. Senator from Colorado from 1909 to 1911 (died 1911)
- February 18 – Ernest Fenollosa, Orientalist (died 1908 in the United Kingdom)
- March 4 – Alexander S. Clay, U.S. Senator from Georgia from 1897 to 1910 (died 1910)
- March 5 – Howard Pyle, artist and fiction writer (died 1911)
- April 8 – Laura Alberta Linton, chemist (died 1915)
- April 23 – Thomas Nelson Page, writer and lawyer (died 1922)
- May 3 – E. W. Howe, author and editor (died 1937)
- May 8 – Katharine Lente Stevenson, reformer, missionary and editor (died 1919)
- June 12 – Chester Adgate Congdon, Minnesota mining magnate (died 1916)
- July 24 – William Gillette, actor, playwright and stage-manager (died 1937)
- July 27 – Elizabeth Plankinton, Milwaukee philanthropist (died 1923 in Switzerland)
- September 17 – Henry Churchill de Mille, dramatist and playwright (died 1893)
- October 14 – John William Kendrick, railroad executive (died 1924)
- November 9 – Stanford White, architect (murdered 1906)
- November 13 – John Drew, Jr., actor (died 1927)
- November 26 – Bat Masterson, lawman (died 1921)
- December 23 – William Henry Moody, 35th United States Secretary of the Navy, 45th United States Attorney General, and Associate Justice of the Supreme Court of the United States (died 1917)
- December 31 – Tasker H. Bliss, general (died 1930)

== Deaths ==
- January 16 – Robert Lucas, governor of Ohio (born 1781)
- January 26 – Sylvester Judd, novelist (born 1813)
- March 30 – Abigail Fillmore, First Lady of the United States and Second Lady of the United States as wife of Millard Fillmore (born 1798)
- April 13 – James Iredell Jr., 23rd governor of North Carolina from 1827 to 1828 (born 1788)
- April 18 – William R. King, 13th vice president of the United States from March to April 1853 (born 1786)
- May 2 – Jesse B. Thomas, U.S. Senator from Illinois from 1818 to 1829 (born 1777)
- July 24 – Hezekiah C. Seymour, civil engineer (born 1811)
- August 23 – Alexander Calder, first mayor of Beaumont, Texas (born 1806)
- September 5 – George Poindexter, 2nd governor of Mississippi from 1820 to 1822 and U.S. Senator from Mississippi from 1830 to 1835 (born 1779)
- September 15 – Hope H. Slatter, slave trader of Baltimore
- October 5 – Mahlon Dickerson, judge and politician (born 1770)
- October 27 – Maria White Lowell, poet (born 1821)
- November 15 – Charles G. Atherton, U.S. Senator from New Hampshire from 1843 to 1849 and in 1853 (born 1804)
- December 28 – Sarah Goodridge, miniature painter (born 1788)

== See also ==
- Timeline of United States history (1820–1859)
