= 1859 in the United States =

- Decades: 1830s; 1840s; 1850s; 1860s; 1870s
- See also: History of the United States (1849–1865); Timeline of United States history (1820–1859); List of years in the United States

Events from the year 1859 in the United States.

== Incumbents ==
=== Federal government ===
- President: James Buchanan (D-Pennsylvania)
- Vice President: John C. Breckinridge (D-Kentucky)
- Chief Justice: Roger B. Taney (Maryland)
- Speaker of the House of Representatives: James Lawrence Orr (D-South Carolina)
- Congress: 35th (until March 4), 36th (starting March 4)

==== State governments ====
Governors and lieutenant governors

=== Governors ===
- Governor of Alabama: Andrew B. Moore (Democratic)
- Governor of Arkansas: Elias Nelson Conway (Democratic)
- Governor of California: John B. Weller (Democratic)
- Governor of Connecticut: William A. Buckingham (Republican)
- Governor of Delaware: Peter F. Causey (Know Nothing) (until January 18), William Burton (Democratic) (starting January 18)
- Governor of Florida: Madison S. Perry (Democratic)
- Governor of Georgia: Joseph E. Brown (Democratic)
- Governor of Illinois: William Henry Bissell (Republican)
- Governor of Indiana: Ashbel P. Willard (Democratic)
- Governor of Iowa: Ralph P. Lowe (Republican)
- Governor of Kentucky: Charles S. Morehead (Know Nothing) (until August 30), Beriah Magoffin (Democratic) (starting August 30)
- Governor of Louisiana: Robert C. Wickliffe (Democratic)
- Governor of Maine: Lot M. Morrill (Democratic)
- Governor of Maryland: Thomas H. Hicks (Know Nothing)/(Republican)
- Governor of Massachusetts: Nathaniel Prentice Banks (Republican)
- Governor of Michigan: Kinsley S. Bingham (Republican) (until January 5), Moses Wisner (Republican) (starting January 5)
- Governor of Minnesota: Henry H. Sibley (Democratic)
- Governor of Mississippi: William McWillie (Democratic) (until November 21), John J. Pettus (Democratic) (starting November 21)
- Governor of Missouri: Robert Marcellus Stewart (Democratic)
- Governor of New Hampshire: William Haile (Republican) (until June 2), Ichabod Goodwin (Republican) (starting June 2)
- Governor of New Jersey: William A. Newell (Republican)
- Governor of New York: Edwin D. Morgan (Republican) (starting January 1)
- Governor of North Carolina: Thomas Bragg (Democratic) (until January 1), John Willis Ellis (Democratic) (starting January 1)
- Governor of Ohio: Salmon P. Chase (Republican)
- Governor of Oregon: George Law Curry (Democratic) (until March 3), John Whiteaker (Democratic) (starting March 3)
- Governor of Pennsylvania: William F. Packer (Democratic)
- Governor of Rhode Island: Elisha Dyer (Republican) (until May 31), Thomas G. Turner (Republican) (starting May 31)
- Governor of South Carolina: William Henry Gist (Democratic)
- Governor of Tennessee: Isham G. Harris (Democratic)
- Governor of Texas: Hardin R. Runnels (Democratic) (until December 21), Sam Houston (Independent) (starting December 21)
- Governor of Vermont: Hiland Hall (Republican)
- Governor of Virginia: Henry A. Wise (Democratic)
- Governor of Wisconsin: Alexander W. Randall (Republican)

=== Lieutenant governors ===
- Lieutenant Governor of California: John Walkup (Democratic)
- Lieutenant Governor of Connecticut: Julius Catlin (Republican)
- Lieutenant Governor of Illinois: John Wood (Republican)
- Lieutenant Governor of Indiana: Abram A. Hammond (Democratic)
- Lieutenant Governor of Iowa: Oran Faville (Republican)
- Lieutenant Governor of Kentucky:
  - until month and day unknown: vacant
  - month and day unknown: Linn Boyd (political party unknown)
  - starting month and day unknown: vacant
- Lieutenant Governor of Louisiana: William F. Griffin (Democratic)
- Lieutenant Governor of Massachusetts: Eliphalet Trask (political party unknown)
- Lieutenant Governor of Michigan: George Coe (Republican) (until January 5), Edmund B. Fairfield (Republican) (starting January 5)
- Lieutenant Governor of Minnesota: William Holcombe (Democratic)
- Lieutenant Governor of Missouri: Hancock Lee Jackson (Democratic)
- Lieutenant Governor of New York: Robert Campbell (Republican) (starting January 1)
- Lieutenant Governor of Ohio: Martin Welker (Democratic)
- Lieutenant Governor of Rhode Island: Thomas G. Turner (political party unknown) (until May 31), Isaac Saunders (political party unknown) (starting May 31)
- Lieutenant Governor of South Carolina: M. E. Carn (Democratic)
- Lieutenant Governor of Texas: Francis R. Lubbock (Democratic) (until December 21), Edward Clark (Democratic) (starting December 21)
- Lieutenant Governor of Vermont: Burnham Martin (Republican)
- Lieutenant Governor of Virginia: William Lowther Jackson (Democratic)
- Lieutenant Governor of Wisconsin: Erasmus D. Campbell (Democratic)

== Events ==
=== January–March ===
- January 1 – Minting of Indian Head cent begins.
- January 10 – Lucy Cobb Institute opens in Athens, Georgia.
- January 28 – The city of Olympia is incorporated in the Territory of Washington.
- February 14 – Oregon is admitted as the 33rd U.S. state (see History of Oregon).

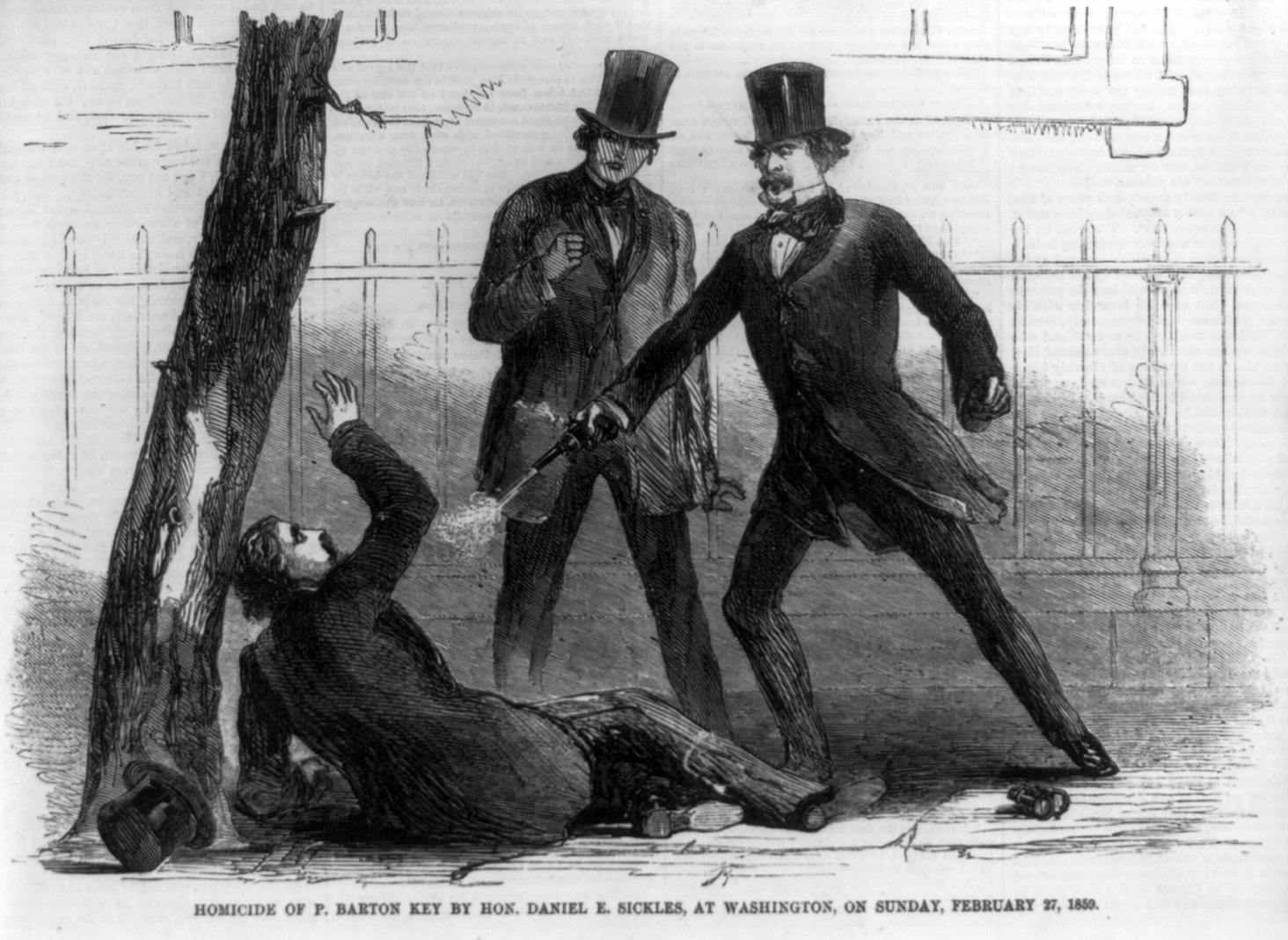
February 27: Philip Barton Key II is killed by Daniel Sickles in Washington

- February 27 – U.S. Congressman Daniel Sickles shoots dead Philip Barton Key for having an affair with his wife.
- March 2–3 – The Great Slave Auction, the largest single sale of slaves in U.S. history, with more than 400 people sold, takes place near Savannah, Georgia.
- March 21 – The Commonwealth of Pennsylvania issues the charter establishing the Zoological Society of Philadelphia, the first organization of its kind in the United States and founder of the nation's first zoo.

=== April–June ===
- April 4 – Bryant's Minstrels premiere the minstrel song "Dixie" (probably written by Dan Emmett) at Mechanics' Hall in New York City as part of their blackface show.
- April 20 – Daniel E. Sickles, a New York Congressman, is acquitted of the murder of Philip Barton Key on grounds of temporary insanity. The case did not mark the first successful use of the "temporary insanity" legal defense, which had been around since 1800 when a man named Hadfield took a shot at George III.
- June 8 – The discovery of the Comstock Lode in the western Utah Territory (present-day Nevada) sets off a rush of prospectors to the area.
- June 15 – The so-called Pig War border dispute between the Americans and the British on the San Juan Islands begins with the shooting of the namesake pig; the episode is resolved in October without human bloodshed.

=== July–September ===
- July – Pike's Peak Gold Rush begins in the Colorado Territory.
- July 1 – The first intercollegiate baseball game is played, between Amherst and Williams Colleges.
- August 1 – Andrew B. Moore is reelected the 16th governor of Alabama defeating William F. Samford.
- August 27 – Edwin Drake drills the first oil well in the United States, near Titusville, Pennsylvania, starting the Pennsylvanian oil rush.
- September – Joshua Abraham Norton proclaims himself "Emperor of the United States" in San Francisco.

=== October–December ===
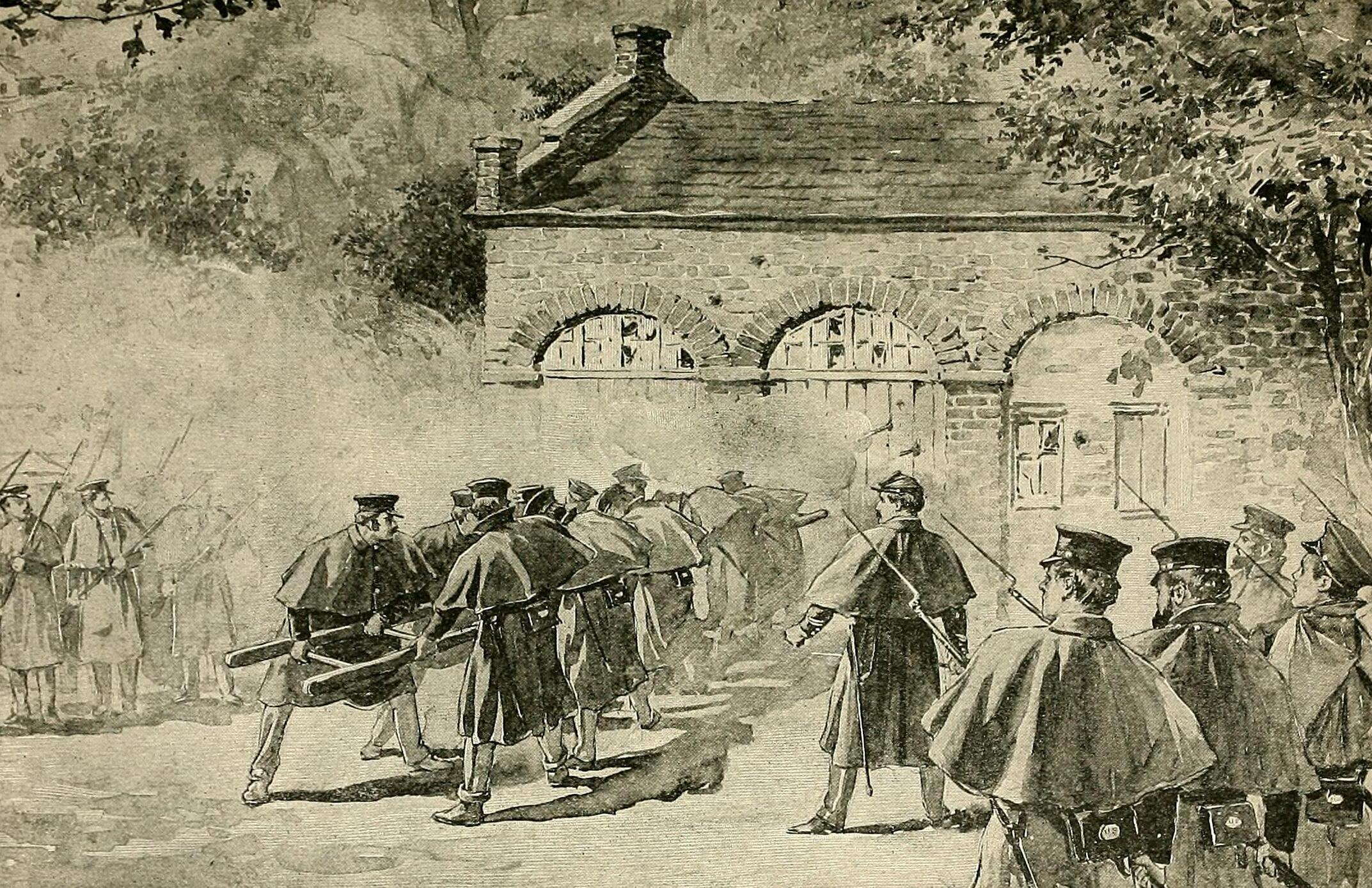
October 16–18: John Brown's raid on Harpers Ferry

- October 16 – Militant abolitionist leader John Brown raids the Harpers Ferry Armory in Harper's Ferry, Virginia, in an unsuccessful bid to spark a general slave rebellion.
- October 18 – Troops under Colonel Robert E. Lee overpower John Brown at the Federal arsenal.
- November 1 – The current Cape Lookout, North Carolina, lighthouse is lighted for the first time (its first-order Fresnel lens can be seen for 19 miles).
- December 2 – John Brown is hanged at Charles Town, West Virginia for his October 16 raid on Harpers Ferry.

=== Undated ===
- The Rancho Rincon de Los Esteros Land Grant is confirmed to Rafael Alvisa (part of modern-day Santa Clara County, California).
- The University of Michigan Law School is founded.

=== Ongoing ===
- Bleeding Kansas (1854–1860)

== Births ==
- January 6 – Duncan U. Fletcher, U.S. Senator from Florida from 1909 to 1936 (died 1936)
- January 9 – Carrie Chapman Catt, women's suffrage leader (died 1947)
- January 12 – Henry Heitfeld, U.S. Senator from Idaho from 1897 to 1903 (died 1938)
- January 25 – Lillie Eginton Warren, educator (year of death unknown)
- January 29 – Virginie Amélie Avegno Gautreau, née Avegno, society beauty (died 1915 in France)
- February 6 – Elias Disney, farmer, father of Walt Disney (died 1941)
- February 22 – Samuel D. Nicholson, U.S. Senator from Colorado from 1921 to 1923 (died 1923)
- February 25 – John Burke, 24th Treasurer of the United States (died 1937)
- March 12 – Abraham H. Cannon, Mormon apostle (died 1896)
- March 21 – Abbie Pratt, golfer (died 1938 in France)
- April 12 – Junius George Groves, slave-born potato farmer (died 1925)
- May 12 – William Alden Smith, U.S. Senator from Michigan from 1907 to 1919 (died 1932)
- June 29 – Margaret Ashmore Sudduth, educator, editor and temperance advocate (died 1957)
- July 13 – Marion Manville Pope, author (died 1930)
- July 31 – Theobald Smith, bacteriologist (died 1934)
- August 15 – Charles Comiskey, baseball baseman, manager and owner (died 1931)
- August 28 – Matilda Howell, archer (died 1938)
- September 16 – Frank R. Gooding, U.S. Senator from Idaho from 1921 to 1928 (died 1928)
- September 17 – Billy The Kid, Old West gunfighter (died 1881)
- October 20 – John Dewey, educator born in Vermont (died 1952)
- November 1 – Charles Brantley Aycock, 50th Governor of North Carolina (died 1912)
- December 20 – Adaline Hohf Beery, songbook compiler (died 1929)

== Deaths ==
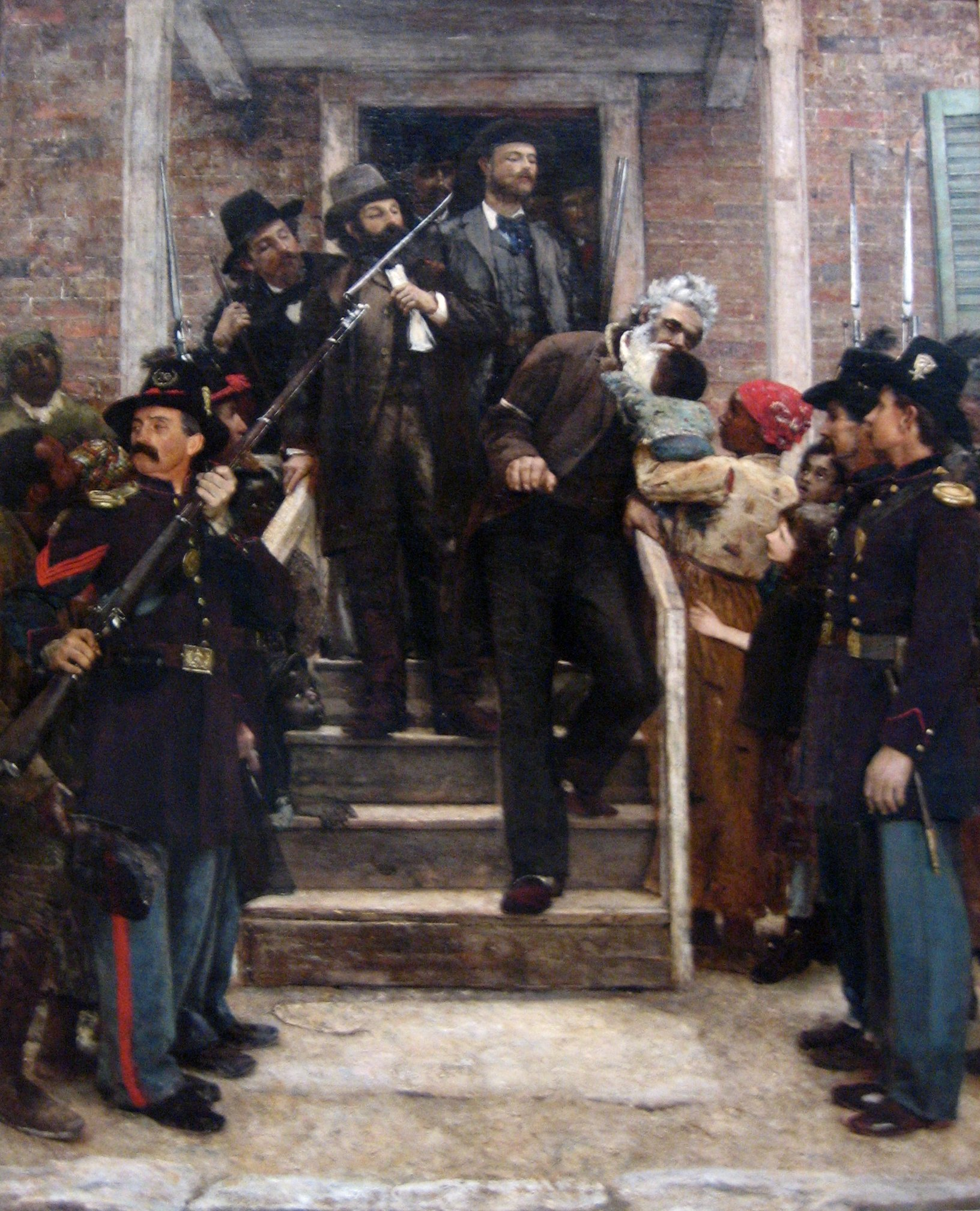
The Last Moments of John Brown by Thomas Hovenden, 1882–1884

- January 28 – William H. Prescott, Hispanist historian (born 1796)
- January 29 – William Cranch Bond, astronomer (born 1789)
- February 25 – Edward A. Hannegan, U.S. Senator from Indiana from 1843 to 1849 (born 1807)
- February 27 – Philip Barton Key II, United States Attorney for the District of Columbia, murdered (born 1818)
- March 19 – Oliver H. Smith, U.S. Senator from Indiana from 1837 to 1843 (born 1794)
- March 30 – James Matthews Legaré, poet and inventor (born 1823)
- April 14 – George M. Bibb, U.S. Senator from Kentucky from 1811 to 1814 (born 1776)
- June 8 – Walter Hunt, inventor (born 1796)
- July 30 – Richard Rush, 8th United States Attorney General and 8th United States Secretary of the Treasury (born 1780)
- August 2 – Horace Mann, educator and abolitionist (born 1796)
- August 15 – Nathaniel Claiborne, politician (born 1777)
- September 2 – Delia Bacon, playwright and writer on the Shakespeare authorship question (born 1811)
- September 16 – David C. Broderick, U.S. Senator from California from 1857 to 1859 (born 1820)
- November 28 – Washington Irving, author (born 1783)
- November 29 – William Hale, soldier, politician and the first mayor of Peoria, Illinois (b. 1783)
- December 2 – John Brown, abolitionist, hanged (born 1800)

== See also ==
- Timeline of United States history (1820–1859)
