= William Wood Farmer =

American politician (1813–1854)

3rd Lieutenant Governor of Louisiana
- In office 1853 – October 23, 1854
- Governor: Paul Octave Hébert
- Preceded by: Jean Baptiste Plauché
- Succeeded by: Charles Homer Mouton

Personal details
- Born: April 27, 1813 Ouachita Parish, Louisiana, U.S.
- Died: October 23, 1854 (aged 41) New Orleans, Louisiana, U.S.
- Cause of death: Yellow fever
- Resting place: Farmerville Cemetery, Farmerville, Louisiana, U.S.
- Party: Democratic
- Spouse: Permelia Ann Mixon (m. 1842)
- Children: 2
- Parent(s): Mills Farmer; Susannah Wood
- Profession: Politician

William Wood Farmer (April 27, 1813 – October 23, 1854) was an American politician. In 1853 and 1854 he served as the third lieutenant governor of Louisiana.

== Life ==
William Farmer was born in Ouachita Parish, Louisiana. He received an excellent education and he served as one of the first justices of the peace in his home area. He owned a plantation and he worked as a surveyor. Politically he joined the Democratic Party and he served several terms in both chambers of the Louisiana Legislative. In 1852 he was elected to the office of the Lieutenant Governor of Louisiana. He served in this position between 1853 and his death the following year. In this function he was the deputy of Governor Paul Octave Hébert and he presided over the Louisiana State Senate. In October 1854 he travelled to New Orleans on a business trip, where he caught the yellow fever. He did not recover from the disease and died on 23 October still in New Orleans.

Political offices
Preceded by Jean Baptiste Plauché	Lieutenant Governor of Louisiana; 1853-1854	Succeeded by Robert C. Wickliffe
