= 1852 Louisiana gubernatorial election =

- December 6, 1852
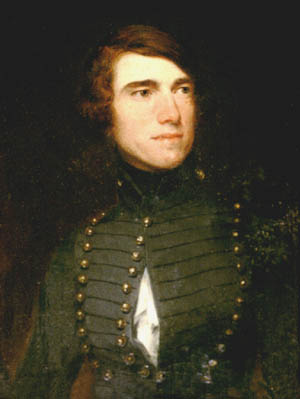

Nominee	Paul Octave Hébert	Louis Bordelon
Party	Democratic	Whig
Popular vote	17,813	15,781
Percentage	53.02%	46.98%
- Parish Results; Hebert: 50–60% 60–70% 70–80% Bourdelon: 50–60% 60–70% 70–80% 80–90% No Data/Vote
Governor before election
Joseph Marshall Walker
Democratic
Elected Governor
Paul Octave Hébert
Democratic

The 1852 Louisiana gubernatorial election was the first election to take place under the Louisiana Constitution of 1852. The new constitution shortened the term of Governor Walker and also the term of his successor to make calendar adjustments.

== Results ==
Popular Vote

Party	Candidate	Votes received	Percentage
Democratic	Paul Octave Hébert	17,813	53.02%
Whig	Louis Bordelon	15,781	46.98%
Total Vote		33,594	

Preceded by 1849 Louisiana gubernatorial election	Louisiana gubernatorial elections	Succeeded by 1855 Louisiana gubernatorial election
