= Senator Mouton (disambiguation) =

Alexandre Mouton (1804–1885) was a U.S. Senator from Louisiana from 1837 to 1842. Senator Mouton may also refer to:

- Charles Homer Mouton (1823–1912), Louisiana State Senate
- Edgar Mouton (1929–2016), Louisiana State Senate
