= Governor Wickliffe =

Governor Wicklife may refer to:

- Charles A. Wickliffe (1788–1869), Acting Governor of Kentucky from 1839 to 1840
- Robert C. Wickliffe (1819–1895), 15th Governor of Louisiana
