= Jean Baptiste Plauché =

Soldier and Politician from Louisiana

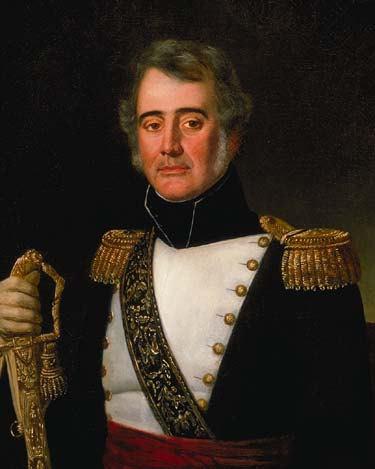
- Portrait by Jean Joseph Vaudechamp, 1836.

2nd Lieutenant governor of Louisiana
- In office 1850–1853
- Governor: Joseph Marshall Walker
- Preceded by: Trasimond Landry
- Succeeded by: William Wood Farmer

Personal details
- Born: 28 January 1785 New Orleans, Louisiana
- Died: 2 January 1860 (aged 74) New Orleans, Louisiana
- Party: Democratic

Military service
- Allegiance: United States
- Branch/service: Battalion of Orleans
- Rank: Brigadier general
- Battles/wars: War of 1812; Battle of New Orleans

Jean Baptiste Plauché (28 January 1785 – 2 January 1860) was a Louisiana soldier and politician. He was the second lieutenant governor of Louisiana from 1850 to 1853 under Governor Joseph M. Walker.

== Biography ==
Plauché was born in New Orleans on 28 January 1785. His father, Etienne Henri Plauché, had emigrated from Marseille, France, to Louisiana when he was 25 and established himself in New Orleans, where he earned a reputation as an "honest and industrious man". He later died at the age of 82. His mother, Marguerite Selam, was a New Orleans native who was educated at the Ursuline Academy. Plauché learned many of the gentlemanly customs of his day from his mother.

Plauché started out as a cotton trade merchant, but was later elected leader of the Battalion D'Orleans, which consisted of New Orleans Businessmen and shopkeepers, veterans of Napoleon Bonaparte, local Native Americans, and members of the famed pirate Jean Lafitte, who drilled weekly and furnished their own uniforms.

In the Battle of New Orleans, Major Plauché headed the Bataillon d'Orleans militia. With the assistance of Senator Edward Livingston, he had formed the battalion from five uniformed companies, with a strength of 289 men. At the time (December 1814 – January 1815), he was 29 years old, starting at the rank of Brigader General, and later rose to Major General. In the early stages of the Battle of New Orleans, Plauché's troops were stationed at Fort Bayou St. John, near Lake Pontchartrain, keeping a lookout for British Troops arriving from the North. After being summoned to the city, the troops ran 5 miles from the fort to the Vieux Carré, being one of the first of Jackson's men to arrive. Colonel Andrew Jackson, a man who was known for "not scattering praise where it wasn't deserved", was so impressed with the performance of the Bataillon d'Orleans and Plauché, that he praised them in a letter before he left the city:

"New Orleans. April 5th, 1815.

Head Quarters, 7th Military District

SIR: Before departing from your State, I owe it to justice and to my own feelings, to state the sentiments I entertain of your services during the four weeks' campaign near New Orleans. have ever found you ready to encounter fatigues and dangers in the service of your country. Your conduct, sir, gives you the best founded claims to its gratitude, and has secured to you the sincere regard of your humble and obedient servant.

ANDREW JACKSON, Maj. Gen. Com'ng. 7th. M. D."

After Jackson's retirement from public life, he and Plauché kept up a friendly correspondence. Plauché's troops participated in the Night attack of December 23, 1814, and the final battle of January 8, 1815. Plauché later rose to the rank of brigadier general in the Legion of Louisiana.

== Post War ==
After the war, Plauché maintained a steady public life, having serving his state by serving as New Orleans city councilman, Louisiana state representative, and Lieutenant Governor from 1850-1853. He was the first Lieutenant Governor to be sworn in to office in Baton Rouge after it was made the state capitol of Louisiana. He helped his brother, Judge Joseph Alexander Plauché (who was also Major General in the Battle of New Orleans), survey and map the Avoyelles Parish Territory for the United States Government, where Joseph's three sons, Etienne, François, and Martin Visitant Plauché founded the town of Plaucheville. He also provided financial aid to former president Andrew Jackson, giving him a loan of $7000 after his crops failed in 1841 at his Nashville residence. The two viewed each other as brothers.

In 1835, Plauché and his legion suppressed a mob that was threatening civil authority in the city. His bravery and leadership was met with another letter of praise, this time from the city council:

"New Orleans, Sept. 4th, 1835,

General J.B. Plauché, commanding the legion of Louisiana

Dear Sir, The undersigned members of the city council, specially appointed to wait on you and to present to you and the officers and the privates of the legion, the thanks of the city for the zeal and patriotism displayed by all of you during the late attempts to disturb public tranquillity, have the honor berewith to transmit you a copy of the resolutions of the City Council adopted at their sitting on the 31st day of August last. In doing so, they beg leave to assure the members of the legion of the high sense of their gallantry and devotion, and of the pleasure it affords them to be the medium through which is offered this well merited tribute of respect to a corps. of which the city has so many just reasons to be proud . We have the honor to remain with the highest considerations.

Your obedient servants,

L. I. GAINNIE, G. SCHMIDT, THOMAS, JAMES H. CALD-WELL, T. BERRY, JOSHUA BALDWIN."

Plauché was married to Mathilde St. Amand (22 October 1791 – 26 October 1840). They had seven children. Plauché died 2 January, 1860, at the age of 74. His 1836 painting, painted by Jean Joseph Vaudechamp, now resides in the Cabildo museum, the former home of the Spanish Legislature in Louisiana and the site of the Louisiana Purchase transfer from France to the United States, along Jackson Square.

== Tributes ==
Camp Plauché, a troop staging area and Axis POW camp near Harahan, Louisiana, during World War II, was named in his honor.

The Jackson Day Race was established, following the same route Plauché and his troops followed from Spanish Fort to the French Quarter, celebrated annually.

Political offices
Preceded by Trasimond Landry	Lieutenant Governor of Louisiana; 1850–1853	Succeeded by William W. Farmer
