= William Harllee =

American lawyer (1812–1897)

William Wallace Harllee
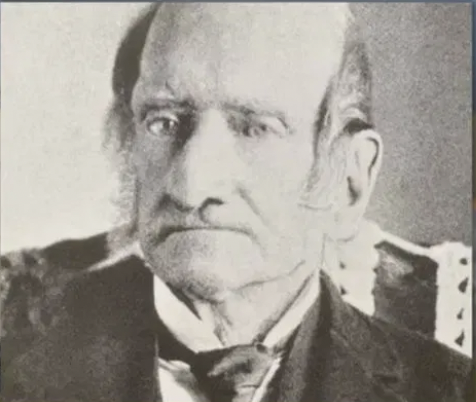

49th Lieutenant Governor of South Carolina
- In office December 14, 1860 – December 17, 1862
- Governor: Francis Wilkinson Pickens
- Preceded by: M. E. Carn
- Succeeded by: Plowden Weston

Personal details
- Born: July 29, 1812 Marion County, South Carolina, US
- Died: April 29, 1897 (aged 84) Florence County, South Carolina, US
- Party: Democratic
- Spouse: Martha Sarah Shackleford
- Children: 7

Military service
- Allegiance: Confederate States of America
- Branch/service: South Carolina National Guard
- Rank: General
- Battles/wars: American Civil War

William Wallace Harllee (July 29, 1812 – April 29, 1897) was an American lawyer, businessman, and politician who served as the 49th lieutenant governor of South Carolina.

== Biography ==
Harllee was born in 1812 in Marion County, South Carolina and married in 1840. He practiced law in Marion and became a brigadier general in the South Carolina Militia. He served two non-consecutive terms in the South Carolina House of Representatives, elected once in 1836 and again in 1848.

He became the founder and president of Wilmington and Manchester Railroad; he oversaw the construction of the railroad across eastern South Carolina. Along the tracks, a small village was established. Harllee named this village after his daughter, Florence. Gen. W. W. Harllee, the president of the W & M, built his home at the junction, and named the community "Florence", after his daughter. The city of Florence, South Carolina had a population of 39,899 in the 2020 census.

In 1860, Harllee was elected lieutenant governor and assumed office December 14, 1860, six days before the state seceded from the United States. Harllee was one of the signers of South Carolina's declaration of secession. He served one term until 1862. Harllee was elected the president of the South Carolina Bar Association in 1885.

== Legacy ==
In 2022, the Florence County council voted 5–4 to publicly display a statue that depicts him and his daughter, Florence, on the grounds of the county library. The sculpture was created by Alex Palkovich in 2017. The decision provoked backlash from the community because of Harllee's support of slavery, which led the county to reverse its decision.
