= Louisiana Department of Culture, Recreation & Tourism =

State agencies of Louisiana, United States

- Département de la culture, des loisirs et du tourisme de la Louisiane
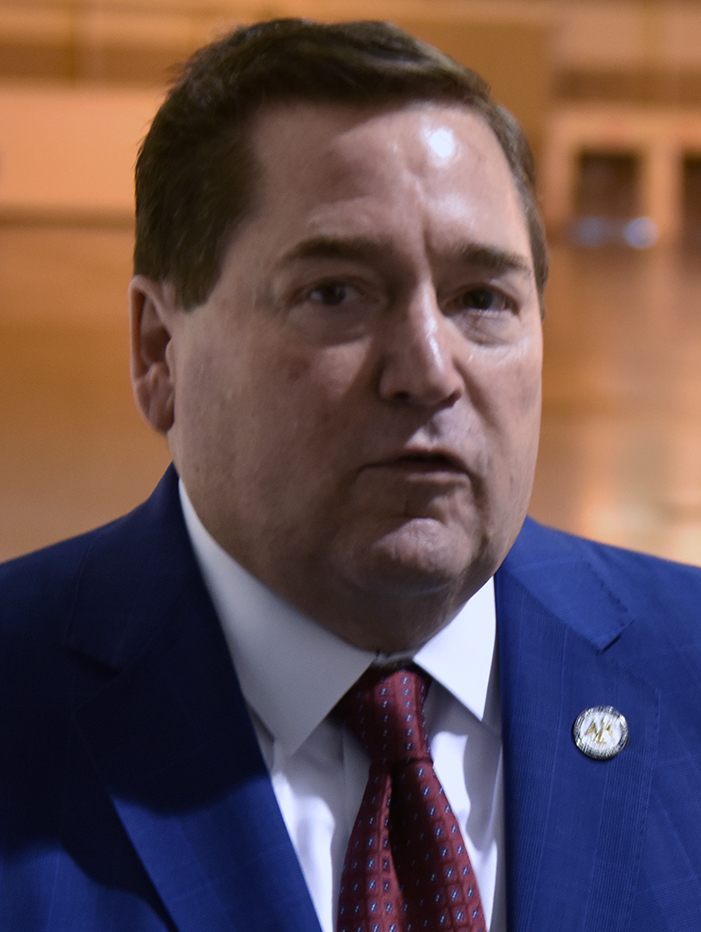
- Incumbent; Billy Nungesser since January 11, 2016
- Appointer: Popular election
- Term length: Four years
- Inaugural holder: Trasimond Landry
- Formation: 1846
- Succession: 1st

Louisiana Department of Culture, Recreation & Tourism is a state agency and department within the Office of the Lt. Governor. The department is composed of six offices, Office of the Secretary, Office of State Library, Office of State Museum, Office of State Parks, Office of Cultural Development, and Office of Tourism.

The Lieutenant Governor is the chief tourism official as commissioner of the department, involving the $18 billion tourism industry, and manages state parks, museums, and historic sites. In 2019 Billy Nungesser won a second term as Louisiana's lieutenant governor.

== Organization ==
The Lieutenant Governor, second-in-command in the executive branch, is considered Louisiana's ambassador as Commissioner of the Department of Culture, Recreation and Tourism. The position was created by legislative act by Article IV, Section 1(A), 6, and 15 of Louisiana State Constitution of 1974; Louisiana Revised Statute 49:202.1; Act 124 of 1986 and Act 13 Special Session of 1986.

=== Office of the Secretary ===
Ensures efficient, accountable and entrepreneurial operation of all agencies within the department as well as providing management and finance.

The Seafood Promotion & Marketing Board was created in 1981 By legislative act, statute R.S. 56:578.2(A)(1). The 14 member board is appointed by the Lieutenant Governor and placed under the Office of the Secretary.

=== Office of State Library ===
Created by Louisiana Legislature in 1920, the Louisiana Library Commission, now the State Library of Louisiana, has operations in all 64 parishes.

=== Office of State Museum ===
The Office of State Museum operates with the advisory "State Museum Board of Directors" tasked with overseeing nine state museums. The Museum Board of Directors is currently awaiting a study and possible future legislation, supported by the Lt. Governor, that will return the hiring and firing of the museum director back to the Museum Board.

=== Office of State Parks ===
There are 21 state parks that are currently overseen by an Interim Assistant Secretary and a Director of Outdoor Recreation under the Office of State Parks. An 18-member State Parks and Recreation Commission was created by legislation as an advisory body.

=== Office of Cultural Development ===
The Office of Cultural Development (OCD) consists of four divisions:

- Division of the Arts (since 1977): Provides programs, services, and support to individual artists and a variety of arts and cultural organizations. The division is supported and advised by a 24-member Louisiana State Arts Council. and includes the Louisiana Folklife Program advised by a diverse 22 member Louisiana Folklife Commission.
- Division of Archaeology: Records, protects and distributes information about Louisiana's archaeological resources and heritage.
- Division of Historic Preservation: Preserves and protects Louisiana's significant historic buildings, sites, districts and communities.
- Council for the Development of French in Louisiana - Agence Des Affaires Francophones or CODOFIL proclaims the mission "to support and grow Louisiana's francophone communities through scholarships, French immersion and various other community and language skill-building programs.".

=== Office of Tourism ===
The stated goal is to provide opportunities for education, conservation, interpretation and recreation, jobs, and economic growth through tourism.
