= 1849 Louisiana gubernatorial election =

- November 5, 1849
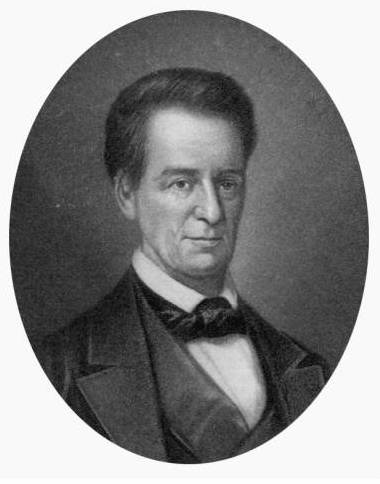

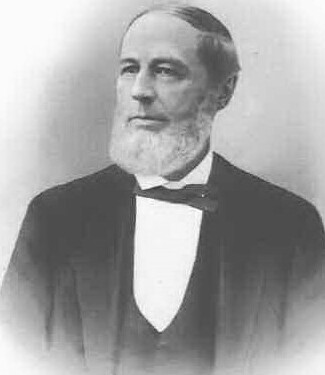
| Nominee | Joseph Marshall Walker | Alexandre DeClouet |
| Party | Democratic | Whig |
| Popular vote | 14,485 | 13,807 |
| Percentage | 51.20% | 48.80% |
- Parish Results; Walker: 50–60% 60–70% 70–80% DeClouet: 50–60% 60–70% 70–80% 80–90% Tie: 50%
Governor before election
Isaac Johnson
Democratic
Elected Governor
Joseph Marshall Walker
Democratic

The 1849 Louisiana gubernatorial election was the last of two elections to take place under the Louisiana Constitution of 1845. The new constitution abolished the provision in the 1812 constitution that required a gubernatorial candidate to win a vote of the legislature to get elected, leaving the final decision up to the people. The new constitution also cut incumbent Governor Alexandre Mouton's term short by one year thus moving the election from July 1846 to January 1846 with the inauguration of the new governor in February.

== Results ==
Popular Vote

| Party | Candidate | Votes received | Percentage |
|---|---|---|---|
| Democratic | Joseph Marshall Walker | 14,485 | 51.20% |
| Whig | Alexandre DeClouet | 13,807 | 48.80% |
| Total Vote | | 28,292 | |

| Preceded by 1846 Louisiana gubernatorial election | Louisiana gubernatorial elections | Succeeded by 1852 Louisiana gubernatorial election |
