= Joseph Marshall Walker =

American politician (1784–1856)

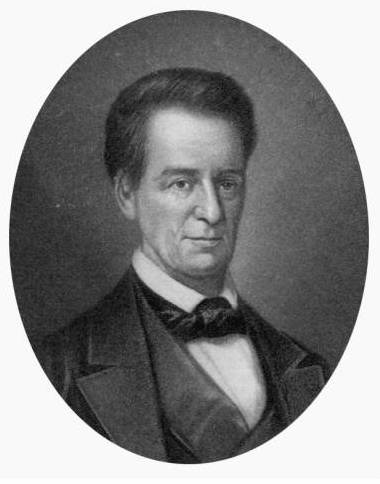

13th Governor of Louisiana
- In office January 28, 1850 – January 18, 1853
- Lieutenant: Jean Baptiste Plauché
- Preceded by: Isaac Johnson
- Succeeded by: Paul O. Hébert

Member of the Louisiana House of Representatives
- In office 1820-1824; 1832-1836

Personal details
- Born: July 1, 1784 New Orleans, New Spain
- Died: January 26, 1856 (aged 71) Alexandria, Louisiana
- Party: Democratic
- Spouse: Catherine Carter
- Children: 12

Military service
- Allegiance: Spain; United States
- Branch/service: Spanish Army; Louisiana Militia
- Years of service: 1812 - 1820
- Rank: Brigadier General
- Battles/wars: War of 1812; Battle of New Orleans

Joseph Marshall Walker (July 1, 1784 – January 20, 1856) was a politician and cotton planter who was the 13th Governor of Louisiana, serving from 1850 to 1853. He oversaw the passage of the 1845 Louisiana Constitution and was first Governor inaugurated in the new state capital building in Baton Rouge.

== Early life ==
Joseph Marshall Walker was born in the French Quarter of New Orleans on July 1, 1786, when Louisiana was a Spanish colony. He was the son of English immigrant Peter Walker and Charlotte Constance Revoil, a second-generation Louisiana creole woman.

He received a limited, private education in his youth and in 1807 travelled to Mexico where he joined the Spanish army. He was commissioned a lieutenant of the dragoons, and for a time headed the military school at Chihuahua. He continued his military career after returning to New Orleans after the Louisiana Purchase. He volunteered in the Louisiana Militia and served under the command of General Andrew Jackson during the Battle of New Orleans. He was promoted to the rank of Brigadier General and given command of the First Brigade of the state militia

He married Catherine Carter, originally from Adams County, Mississippi, with whom he had twelve children. Walker purchased land in Rapides Parish which he later developed into a cotton plantation.

== Political career ==
Walker entered into politics in 1820 when he was elected to the Louisiana House of Representatives. He was reelected several times and served as a state congressman until 1836. He also served a term in the state senate starting in 1824.

He was elected as President of the 1845 State Constitutional Convention. The proposed changes of the new constitution abolished property qualification for voting and/or holding public office and directed the legislature to create a public school system. Objections included the limited right of the legislature to borrow money, a prohibition against public loans, chartering new banks, and restrictions on licensing of corporations. Walker and most other Democrats supported the new constitution and saw it pass.

Walker was selected as the Democratic Nominee in the 1849 Gubernatorial Election. He defeated Whig opponents Alexander De Clouet and Duncan F. Kenner. On 28 January 1850, he became the first governor inaugurated in the new state capital at Baton Rouge.

As governor he worked to continue the work of his predecessors of upholding the 1845 constitution, especially establishing a public school system. He promoted state infrastructure projects including advancements to water transportation, improvements to the levees, railroad construction, and authorized a drainage program. He supported the election of public officials, especially judges, by popular vote rather than political appointment.

There was widespread opposition to the 1846 State Constitution, and in 1852, a convention elected to adopt a new one. Walker strongly objected to this document, and, as a result, he subsequently resigned his position the following year, retiring to a family plantation in Rapides Parish. He turned down offers from Democratic Party officials to be their candidate for the United States House of Representatives. Joseph Marshall Walker died three years later in 1856 and is buried on his plantation.

Party political offices
Preceded by Isaac Johnson	Democratic nominee for Governor of Louisiana; 1849	Succeeded by Paul Octave Hébert
Political offices
Preceded by Isaac Johnson	Governor of Louisiana; 1850–1853	Succeeded by Paul Octave Hebert
