= Alexandre Etienne de Clouet =

American politician

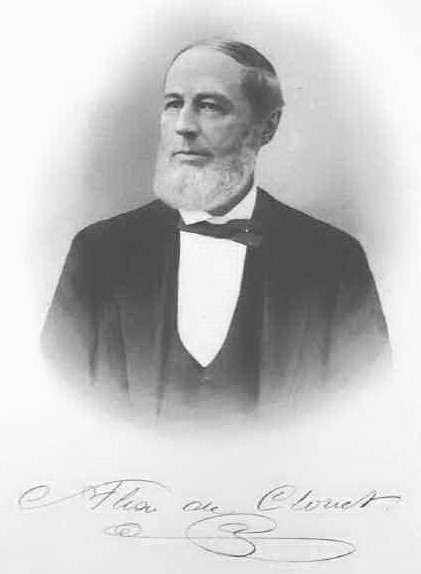
Col. Alexandre Etienne de Clouet (1812–1890)

Alexandre Etienne de Clouet (June 9, 1812 – June 26, 1890), also known as Alexandre Etienne de Clouet Sr., was an American politician and sugar planter who was active in Louisiana politics both before and after the Civil War. During Reconstruction, he violently opposed Black suffrage, becoming a leader of the violent White League that attacked freedmen who attempted to vote.

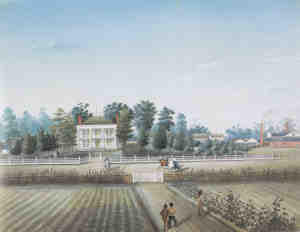
Alexandre De Clouet's plantation home

== Biography ==
Alexandre Etienne de Clouet — often rendered "DeClouet" in contemporary documents — was born on June 9, 1812, in St. Martin Parish, Louisiana. Before the Civil War, he was a Whig, serving as the party's candidate for governor in 1849. He also served in both houses of the Louisiana legislature. He was one of the state's largest slaveholders, enslaving 226 people in 1860.

In 1860, he was elected by St. Martin Parish to the state's secession convention as a strong advocate for leaving the union. Later, he served as a deputy to the Provisional Congress of the Confederate States from 1861 to 1862 and was a signer of the Constitution of the Confederate States. After the Confederacy's defeat, de Clouet worked to take away the rights, most prominently suffrage, granted to freed slaves during Reconstruction. In 1874, he became one of the first leaders of the White League, a violent paramilitary group formed to prevent freedmen from voting, including through an insurrection that temporarily overthrew the state's governor at the Battle of Liberty Place.

De Clouet described the league's goal as "consolidating the white race in another effort to restore our state to its rightful rulers" and taking power away from the "unscrupulous adventurers, knaves, and office-seekers" that influenced the "blind and ignorant negro voters." In August 1874, he was voted president of the "White People's Convention," a White League effort to nominate a whites-only ticket of candidates outside the Democratic Party.

That same month, de Clouet led an armed mob of 200 to the St. Martin Parish tax collector's office, accusing him without evidence of favoring black voters in the collection of the poll tax. The mob, grown to 1,000 people, later drove the tax collector out of the parish.

By October, the state of mob rule in St. Martin led the federal government to send armed forces into the parish, arresting de Clouet and several other leaders of what one newspaper called "the DeClouet rebellion." Witnesses testified to a Congressional committee that de Clouet's White Leaguers had run "many colored men...into the swamp" and lynched at least one black man in the lead-up to the November election: "White Republicans did not dare to go out unless with a soldier; no colored man could have registered or voted had not troops been there; a commissioner could not obtain a posse to assist him."

Party political offices
| Preceded by Guillaume Louis DeBuys | Whig nominee for Governor of Louisiana; 1849 | Succeeded by Louis Bordelon |
