= Trasimond Landry =

American politician (1795–1873)

Trasimond Landry (16 December 1795 – 1 October 1873) was an American politician. Between 1846 and 1850 he served as the first lieutenant governor of Louisiana.

== Life ==
Trasimond Landry was born in Ascension Parish, Louisiana which was then known as Post of Lafourche des Chitimachas. During the War of 1812 he served in various functions in the Louisiana Militia. Later he became a planter who owned several sugar plantations on both banks of the Mississippi River. In the 1820s he joined the movement around the future President Andrew Jackson and became a member of the Democratic Party, which was founded by Jackson in 1828. Between 1824 and 1831 Landry held a seat in the Louisiana House of Representatives and in 1832 he was elected to the State Senate. In 1828 and 1836 he was a delegate to the Democratic National Conventions.

In 1846 Trasimond Landry was elected to the office of the Lieutenant Governor of Louisiana. He served in this function between 1846 and 1850 when his term ended. In this function he was the deputy of Governor Isaac Johnson and he presided over the State Senate. During the American Civil War Landry was a Colonel of the Militia. He died on 1 October 1873 in Donaldsonville, Ascension Parish, Louisiana of an attack of dengue fever.

Political offices
Preceded by None	Lieutenant Governor of Louisiana; 1846-1850	Succeeded by Jean Baptiste Plauché
