= Gabriel Cannon =

American politician (1806–1893)

47th Lieutenant Governor of South Carolina
- In office December 9, 1856 – December 10, 1858
- Governor: Robert F.W. Allston
- Preceded by: Richard de Treville
- Succeeded by: M. E. Carn

Personal details
- Born: August 25, 1806 Spartanburg District, South Carolina, US
- Died: December 21, 1893 (aged 87) Spartanburg District
- Party: Democratic Party

Gabriel Cannon (August 25, 1806 - December 21, 1893) was an American politician who served as the 47th lieutenant governor of South Carolina.

== Biography ==
Cannon entered a partnership with Joseph Finger in Fingerville, South Carolina where they established a cotton manufacturing factory. Cannon entered politics when he was elected to the South Carolina House of Representatives from 1842 to 1846 as a member of the Democratic Party. He also served in the South Carolina Senate from 1846 to 1862 and again from 1876 to 1880. In 1856, he was elected lieutenant governor of the state.
