= Paul Octave Hébert =

American politician (1818–1880)

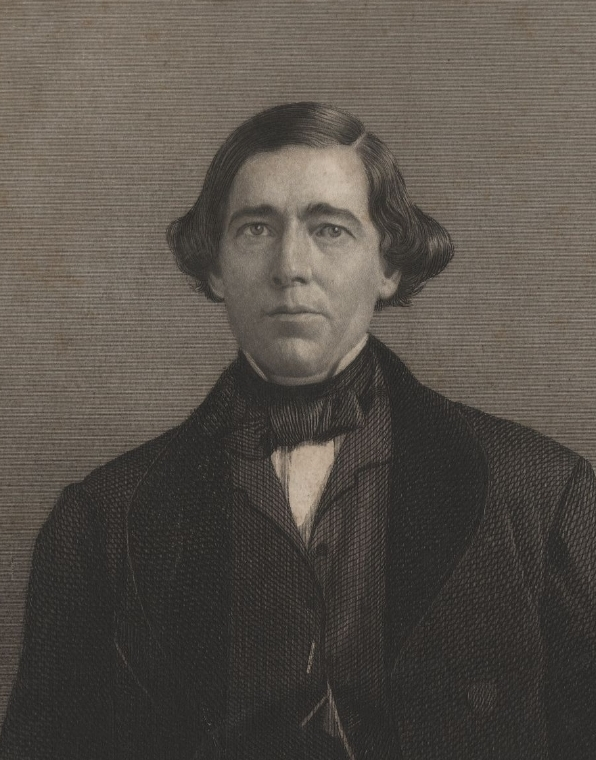

14th Governor of Louisiana
- In office January 18, 1853 – January 22, 1856
- Lieutenant: W.W. Farmer; Robert C. Wickliffe
- Preceded by: Joseph M. Walker
- Succeeded by: Robert C. Wickliffe

Personal details
- Born: December 12, 1818 Plaquemine, Louisiana, U.S.
- Died: August 29, 1880 (aged 61) Bayou Goula, Louisiana, U.S.
- Party: Democratic
- Spouse(s): (1) Marie Coralie Wills Vaughn (2) Penelope Lynch
- Children: 11
- Education: United States Military Academy
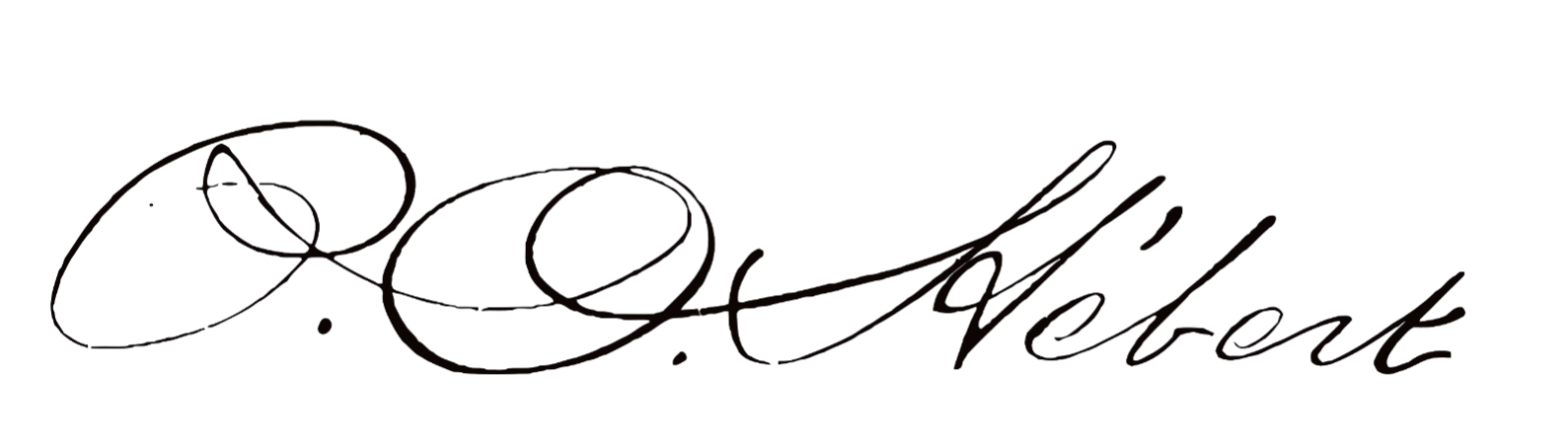
- Signature

Military service
- Allegiance: United States; Confederate States
- Branch/service: United States Army; Confederate States Army
- Years of service: 1840–1845, 1847–1848 (USA); 1861–1865 (CSA)
- Rank: Lieutenant Colonel (USA); Brigadier General (CSA)
- Commands: Trans-Mississippi Department
- Battles/wars: Mexican–American War; Battle of Contreras; Battle of Churubusco; Battle of Molino del Rey; Battle of Chapultepec; Battle for Mexico City; American Civil War; Siege of Vicksburg; Battle of Milliken's Bend

Paul Octave Hébert (December 12, 1818 – August 29, 1880) was an American soldier, engineer and politician who served as 14th Governor of Louisiana from 1853 to 1856. A veteran of the Mexican-American War, he later served as a brigadier general in the Confederate States Army.

== Early life ==
Paul Hébert was born on Acadia Plantation in Iberville Parish on December 1818, the son of Paul Gaston Hébert and Mary Eugenis Hamilton Hébert. In 1836, he graduated at the top of his class from Jefferson College. He then attended the United States Military Academy at West Point, where he matriculated with William T. Sherman and George H. Thomas before graduating at the top of his class in 1840.

He was commissioned as second lieutenant of engineers and worked as an assistant professor of engineering at West Point. He then served as an engineer for the Port of New Orleans during which time he married his first wife, Marie Wills Vaughn, with whom he had five children. In 1845, Hébert resigned from the army after being appointed Chief Engineer of the State of Louisiana by Governor Alexandre Mouton. He was reappointed by Governor Isaac Johnson in 1846, but he resigned in March 1847 to fight in the Mexican–American War.

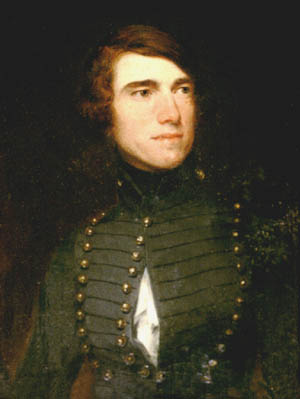
Paul Hébert graduated top of his class from West Point in 1840.

Hébert accepted a commission as a lieutenant colonel of the U.S. 3rd Infantry Regiment, and then on April 9, 1847, he was transferred to the U.S. 14th Infantry Regiment. As a lieutenant colonel of the U.S. 14th Infantry Regiment he fought at Contreras, Churubusco, Molino del Rey, Chapultepec and Mexico City. At Molino del Rey he was honored by General Winfield Scott and was brevetted a colonel for bravery. He was cited for gallantry at Chapultepec and Mexico City. Discharged on July 25, 1848, in New Orleans, Colonel Hébert entered politics.

== Political career ==
He ran as a Democrat for the State Senate in 1849. He lost the election by nine votes. Following this he returned to his sugar plantation in Iberville. In 1851, Governor Joseph Marshall Walker appointed Hébert a delegate to the Industrial Exhibition in London.

The next year, a division among Iberville Parish Whigs gave him a seat at the 1852 Louisiana Constitutional Convention which adopted a new state constitution that was strongly pro-Whig. As a result, Governor Walker resigned early and an election was called. Since John Slidell, the leader of one faction of Louisiana Democrats was focusing on his campaign for the U.S. Senate, the Democrats turned to Hébert as their nominee for governor. He campaigned against some features of the new constitution, called for internal improvements, reform of the state militia, a banking system by general laws and redemption in specie of all paper money. Running against Judge Bordelon, a Whig from St. Landry Parish, Hébert garnered 17,334 votes to Bordelon's 15,781.

=== Term as governor ===
Hébert took the oath as Governor and guided the legislature towards improvements in water commerce and railroad construction. He also established the Louisiana Seminary of Learning at Alexandria which would later become Louisiana State University. Hébert also instituted a state library, reorganized the militia, improved Charity Hospital and organized the efforts against yellow fever of 1853.

Nationalism and the rise of the Know Nothing Party or American Party was a feature of Louisiana politics in the 1850s. Whig newspapers tried to discredit Hébert by starting rumors of his allegiance with the Know Nothings. He still appointed some Whigs to minor offices and some Know Nothings to lucrative posts. He was considered very independent in his appointments and many Democrats were disenchanted with him toward the end of his administration. Hébert was mentioned as a possible candidate for the U.S. Senate, but John Slidell was not vulnerable to an intraparty challenge.

During his administration Hébert saw four major railroads incorporated in Louisiana including the New Orleans, Jackson and Great Northern Railroad. Hébert sought to connect every part of Louisiana to New Orleans by rail. He also built levees and sought land reclamation projects. In 1855, Hébert promoted and the legislature passed a tax of on all property to support the public school system which is open only to whites between the ages of six and sixteen. With his term at an end, Governor Hébert retired to his plantation as a planter.

== Civil War ==
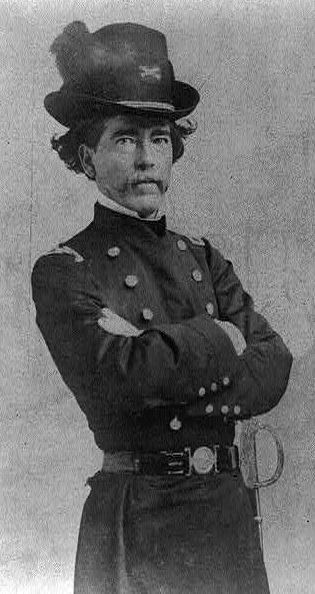
Hébert in military uniform

With rising tension between North and South, President Abraham Lincoln was elected in December, 1860. Governor Thomas Overton Moore appointed Hébert to the military board to reorganize militia and defenses in the New Orleans area. He was appointed as a colonel of the 1st Louisiana Artillery. After secession on April 1, 1861, Hébert was appointed a brigadier general in the Louisiana Militia. In August, he was commissioned a brigadier general in the Provisional Army of the Confederacy but was not given an active position. Later he would have a command of Louisiana troops and in the Trans-Mississippi Department. Also on May 21, 1861, his first wife Marie Coralie Hébert died. He later married Penelope Lynch Andrews, daughter of John Andrews of Iberville Parish.

In 1862, General Hébert was posted to the Department of Texas. Jefferson Davis dismissed him as military commander of Texas on October 10 for imposition of martial law and harsh measures in enforcing conscription. He later participated in the defense of Vicksburg. He saw battle in June, 1863, at the Battle of Milliken's Bend in Louisiana. After that, he was again posted in Texas, where he was at the time the war ended. Hébert returned to his Louisiana plantation and received a pardon from President Andrew Johnson.

== Postwar ==
He was active in the politics of Reconstruction supporting the Liberal Republican movement and accepted a minor appointment in New Orleans. In 1872, Hébert endorsed Horace Greeley and opposed the Louisiana "Custom House" Republican faction. He supported Republican Governor Henry C. Warmoth. Governor William P. Kellogg appointed him to the Board of State Engineers in 1873 and the Board of U.S. Engineers for Mississippi River Commission in 1874.

In the presidential election of 1876, Governor Hébert changed political allegiance back to the Democrats. He died on April 29, 1880, and was buried in St. Paul Cemetery in Bayou Goula, Louisiana. Encroachment of the Mississippi River caused many individuals to be reinterred. Governor Hébert's remains, and those of his first wife, Marie Coralie Hébert, were interred at St. Raphael Cemetery in Point Pleasant, near Plaquemine, LA.

== See also ==
- List of American Civil War Generals (Confederate)
- Louis Hébert (Confederate Army officer) – cousin

== Bibliography ==
- Hall, Andrew W. (2014). Civil War Blockade Running on the Texas Coast. Charleston, SC: History Press. ISBN 978-1-62619-500-4.
- Schmidt, James M. (2012). Galveston and the Civil War: An Island City in the Maelstrom. Charleston, SC: History Press. ISBN 978-1-60949-283-0.
- Warner, Ezra J. (1959). Generals in Gray: Lives of the Confederate Commanders (1st ed.). Baton Rouge: Louisiana State University Press. OCLC 445052.

Party political offices
Preceded by Joseph Marshall Walker	Democratic nominee for Governor of Louisiana; 1852	Succeeded by Robert C. Wickliffe
Political offices
Preceded by Joseph M. Walker	Governor of Louisiana; 1853–1856	Succeeded by Robert C. Wickliffe
