= M. E. Carn =

American politician

Merrick Ezra Carn (1808–1862) was the 48th Lieutenant governor of South Carolina from 1858 to 1860 serving under Governor William Henry Gist. Merrick signed the SC Ordinance of Secession in December 1860 at Charleston.

Merrick was born in 1808, the son of Thomas Carn and Strobel. He was therefore a grandson of Lewis J. Carn, a colonial planter. His uncles Daniel and Lewis Carn were known to be American patriots and Revolutionary War veterans according to the 1835 Pension Roll.

Merrick went to South Carolina College (USC) and later studied law to become a SC lawyer. He held many positions of local and state government, from his home seat in Walterboro, Colleton Co., SC. This included lawyer, attorney, planter, mayor, county and state rep, state senator, and finally as Lt. Governor. He also was presidential elector in the 1850s for the Democratic Party. He also was a member and deacon for the St Jude's Anglican Church in Walterboro. He attended a conference before war broke out.

Merrick married and had one daughter, Mary Carn, who married Fishburne and their son (Merrick's grandson) was E. L. Fishburne, the SC State Supreme Court Justice.

Merrick died in January 1862 and was described by his cousin David Gavin, Esq., as being the most liberal minded of men. Merrick was a registered Southern Democrat. Carn Street in Walterboro city in named after him, and is nearby his historic home. The SC State Bill 2176 in 1979–80 created his gravesite a state historical marker. He is buried at the Ashepoo River Bridge in Colleton County, SC.

== Sources ==
- BOOK: South Carolina Secedes, with picture of ME Carn (SC State Library)
- BOOK: Diary of David Gavin, as published by Dorchester Co Historical Society
- SC BILL 2176: CARN's grave is State Historical Marker.
- 1835 Pension Roll - under CARN, Daniel and Lewis
- PERSONAL REF: Other information provided by family members with historical family records

Political offices
Preceded by Gabriel Cannon	Lieutenant Governor of South Carolina; 1858–1860	Succeeded by W.W. Harllee
