= Lieutenant Governor of Louisiana =

Second highest state office in Louisiana

- Lieutenant-Gouverneur de la Louisiane; Vicegobernador de Luisiana
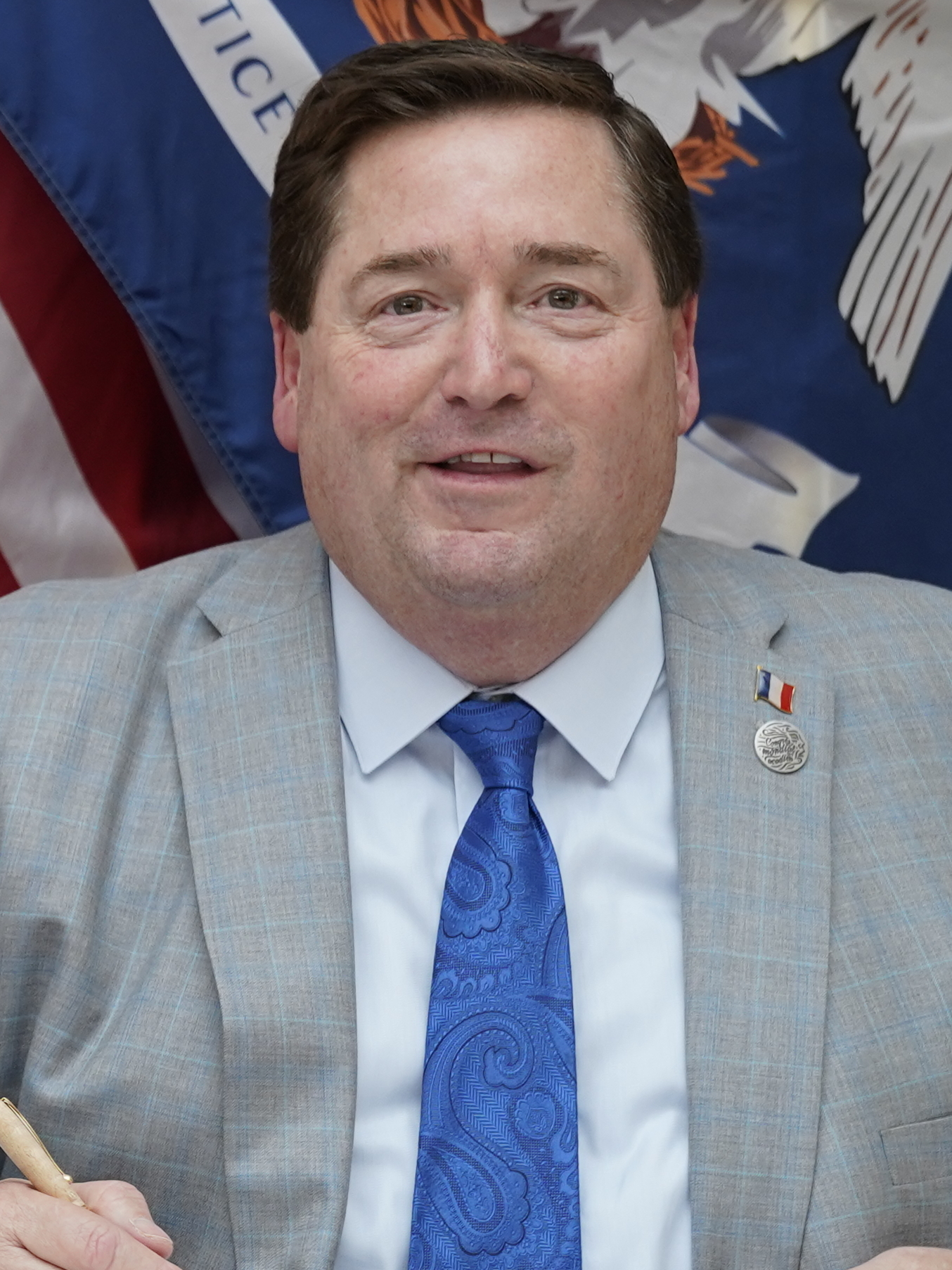
- Incumbent; Billy Nungesser since January 11, 2016
- Government of Louisiana
- Appointer: Popular election
- Term length: Four years, no term limit
- Inaugural holder: Trasimond Landry
- Formation: 1846
- Succession: First

The lieutenant governor of Louisiana (French: Lieutenant-Gouverneur de la Louisiane; Spanish: Vicegobernador de Luisiana) is the second highest state office in Louisiana. The current lieutenant governor is Billy Nungesser, a Republican. The lieutenant governor is also the commissioner of the Louisiana Department of Culture, Recreation & Tourism.

Paul J. Hardy, who served from 1988 to 1992, was the first Republican to be elected to the position since the Reconstruction Era.

== History ==
The office was established by the Louisiana Constitution of 1845. Prior to that, the successor to the governor in the event of his death or resignation was the President of the Louisiana State Senate. A number of state senate presidents succeeded governors before the 1845 Constitution was adopted, including Henry S. Thibodaux, Armand Beauvais and Jacques Dupre.

The lieutenant governor presided over the Louisiana Senate from 1845 until the adoption of the Louisiana Constitution of 1974. Under the new constitution, the lieutenant governor was—effective in 1976—primarily tasked with serving as acting governor in the governor's absence from the state and succeeding to gubernatorial office in the event it became vacant. The document also allowed the governor and the Louisiana State Legislature to delegate responsibilities upon the lieutenant governor at their discretion. In 1986, the legislature placed the Louisiana Department of Culture, Recreation & Tourism under the lieutenant governor's purview, enabling them to appoint the department's leaders.

== Selection ==
Only qualified voters in Louisiana are eligible to be elected lieutenant governor. Any potential lieutenant governor must be at least 25 years of age and have resided in the state for the five previous years. The lieutenant governor is elected on their own ticket separate from the governor.

In the event the lieutenant governor's office becomes vacant, the governor is empowered to nominate a new incumbent subject to the approval of both houses of the legislature.

== Duties and responsibilities ==
The constitution directs the lieutenant governor to assume the office of governor if the previous incumbent vacates the office. If the incumbent governor is unable to act as governor, or is temporarily absent from the state, the lieutenant governor assumes the governor's powers and duties as acting governor. The constitution also designates the lieutenant governor an ex officio member of each committee, board, and commission on which the governor serves.

Aside from these duties, the lieutenant governor can exercise powers delegated to them by the governor or as provided by law. Accordingly, state law designates the lieutenant governor as the commissioner of the Department of Culture, Recreation & Tourism. In this capacity they appoint the department's secretary and several other leading officers, subject to the confirmation of the State Senate.

== List of lieutenant governors ==
Parties

Independent (0) Democratic (46) Republican (8)

=== 1846–1860 ===
No.	Lt. governor	Took office	Left office	Party	Notes	Governor
1	Trasimond Landry	1846	1850	Democratic		Isaac Johnson
2	Jean Baptiste Plauche	1850	1853	Democratic		Joseph Marshall Walker
3	William Wood Farmer	1853	1854	Democratic		Paul Octave Hébert
4	Robert C. Wickliffe	1854	1856	Democratic		Paul Octave Hébert
5	Charles Homer Mouton	1856	1856	Democratic		Robert C. Wickliffe
6	William F. Griffin	1856	1860	Democratic		Robert C. Wickliffe

=== Civil War era ===
==== Lieutenant governors of Confederate Louisiana ====
No.	Lt. governor	Took office	Left office	Party	Notes	Governor
7	Henry M. Hyams	1860	1864	Democratic		Thomas Overton Moore
8	Benjamin W. Pearce	1864	1865	Democratic		Henry Watkins Allen

==== Lieutenant governors of Union-held territory in Louisiana ====
No.	Lt. governor	Took office	Left office	Party	Notes	Governor
9	James M. Wells	1864	1865	Democrat		Michael Hahn (Republican)
10	Albert Voorhies	1865	1866	Democrat		James Madison Wells (Democrat)

=== Resumption of U.S. statehood ===
No.	Lt. governor	Took office	Left office	Party	Notes	Governor
11	Oscar J. Dunn	1868	1871	Republican		Henry C. Warmoth (Republican)
12	P. B. S. Pinchback	1871	1872	Republican		Henry C. Warmoth (Republican)
14	C.C. Antoine	1873	1877	Republican		William P. Kellogg (Republican) 1873-1877
14	C.C. Antoine	1873	1877	Republican		Stephen B. Packard (Republican) 1877
15	Louis A. Wiltz	1877	1880	Democratic		Francis T. Nicholls (Democratic)
16	Samuel D. McEnery	1880	1881	Democratic		Louis A. Wiltz (Democratic)
17	William A. Robertson	1881	1881	Democratic		Samuel D. McEnery (Democratic)
18	George L. Walton	1881	1882	Democratic		Samuel D. McEnery (Democratic)
19	Clay Knobloch	1884	1888	Democratic		Samuel D. McEnery (Democratic)
20	James Jeffries	1888	1892	Democratic		Francis T. Nicholls (Democratic)
21	Charles Parlange	1892	1893	Democratic		Murphy J. Foster (Democratic)
22	Hiram R. Lott	1893	1896	Democratic		Murphy J. Foster (Democratic)
23	Robert H. Snyder	1896	1900	Democratic		Murphy J. Foster (Democratic)
24	Albert Estopinal	1900	1904	Democratic		W. W. Heard (Democratic)
25	Jared Y. Sanders, Sr.	1904	1908	Democratic		Newton C. Blanchard (Democratic)
26	Paul M. Lambremont	1908	1911	Democratic		Jared Y. Sanders, Sr. (Democratic)
27	Thomas C. Barret	1912	1916	Democratic		Luther E. Hall (Democratic)
28	Fernand Mouton	1916	1920	Democratic		Ruffin G. Pleasant (Democratic)
29	Hewitt Bouanchaud	1920	1924	Democratic		John M. Parker (Democratic)
30	Delos R. Johnson	1924	1924	Democratic		John M. Parker (Democratic)
31	Oramel H. Simpson	1924	1926	Democratic		Henry L. Fuqua (Democratic)
32	Philip H. Gilbert	1926	1928	Democratic		Oramel H. Simpson (Democratic)
33	Paul N. Cyr	1928	1931	Democratic		Huey P. Long (Democratic)
34	Alvin Olin King	1931	1932	Democratic		Huey P. Long (Democratic)
35	John B. Fournet	1932	1935	Democratic		O. K. Allen (Democratic)
36	Thomas C. Wingate	1935	1935	Democratic		O. K. Allen (Democratic)
37	James A. Noe	1935	1936	Democratic		O. K. Allen (Democratic)
38	Earl K. Long	1936	1939	Democratic		Richard W. Leche (Democratic)
39	Coleman Lindsey	1939	1940	Democratic		Earl K. Long (Democratic)
40	Marc M. Mouton	1940	1944	Democratic		Sam H. Jones (Democratic)
41	J. Emile Verret	1944	1948	Democratic		Jimmie H. Davis (Democratic)
42	William J. Dodd	1948	1952	Democratic		Earl K. Long (Democratic)
43	C. E. Barham	1952	1956	Democratic		Robert F. Kennon (Democratic)
44	Lether Frazar	1956	1960	Democratic		Earl K. Long (Democratic)
45	Clarence C. (Taddy) Aycock	1960	1972	Democratic		Jimmie H. Davis (Democratic) 1960-1964
45	Clarence C. (Taddy) Aycock	1960	1972	Democratic		John J. McKeithen (Democratic) 1964-1972
46	James E. (Jimmy) Fitzmorris, Jr.	1972	1980	Democratic		Edwin Edwards (Democratic)
47	Robert Louis Freeman Sr.	1980	1988	Democratic		David C. Treen (Republican) 1980-1984
47	Robert Louis Freeman Sr.	1980	1988	Democratic		Edwin Edwards (Democratic) 1984-1988
48	Paul Hardy	1988	1992	Republican		Buddy Roemer (Democratic turn Republican)
49	Melinda Schwegmann	1992	1996	Democratic		Edwin Edwards (Democratic)
50	Kathleen Babineaux Blanco	1996	2004	Democratic		Mike Foster (Republican)
51	Mitchell (Mitch) Landrieu	2004	2010	Democratic		Kathleen Blanco (Democratic)
51	Mitchell (Mitch) Landrieu	2004	2010	Democratic		Bobby Jindal (Republican)
52	Scott Angelle	2010	2010	Democratic		Bobby Jindal (Republican)
52	Scott Angelle	2010	2010	Republican		Bobby Jindal (Republican)
53	John L. (Jay) Dardenne	2010	2016	Republican		Bobby Jindal (Republican)
54	Billy Nungesser	2016	Incumbent	Republican		John Bel Edwards (Democratic)
54	Billy Nungesser	2016	Incumbent	Republican		Jeff Landry (Republican)

== See also ==
- Governor of Louisiana
- President of the Louisiana State Senate

== Works cited ==
- Dawson, Joseph G. III (1990). The Louisiana Governors: From Iberville to Edwards. Louisiana State University Press. ISBN 9780807115275.
- Hargrave, W. Lee (2011). The Louisiana State Constitution. Oxford University Press. ISBN 9780199779031.
- Qualifications of Candidates (PDF), Government of Louisiana, October 2022
