= Charles Homer Mouton =

American politician (1823–1912)

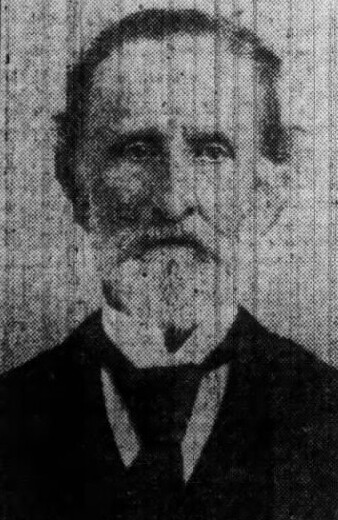
- Portrait of Mouton in a 1912 newspaper

Lieutenant Governor of Louisiana
- In office 1856 – February 26, 1859
- Governor: Robert C. Wickliffe
- Preceded by: Robert C. Wickliffe
- Succeeded by: William F. Griffin

Personal details
- Born: December 8, 1823 St. Landry Parish, Louisiana, U.S.
- Died: March 16, 1912 (aged 88) Lafayette, Louisiana, U.S.
- Party: Democratic
- Spouse(s): Célimène Dupré (m. 1850; died 1865) Emérenthe Olivier (m. 1867)
- Children: 15, including Julian
- Relatives: Alexandre Mouton (uncle); Alfred Mouton (cousin)
- Education: St. Charles College
- Occupation: Politician; judge; lawyer

Military service
- Allegiance: Confederate States
- Branch/service: Confederate States Army
- Battles/wars: American Civil War; Battle of Fort Bisland

Charles Homer Mouton (December 8, 1823 – March 16, 1912) was an American politician and judge from Louisiana. In 1856, he served as the fifth lieutenant governor of Louisiana.

== Early life ==
Charles Homer Mouton was born on December 8, 1823, in St. Landry Parish, Louisiana, to Julie (née Latiolais) and Charles Mouton. He was descended from Acadians who were expelled from their land. His grandfather Jean Mouton was a founder of Vermilionville (later Lafayette, Louisiana). He was a nephew of Alexandre Mouton, governor of Louisiana. He was also related to Fernand Mouton who was Lieutenant Governor of Louisiana between 1916 and 1920.

Mouton was educated at common schools in Lafayette. He was the first to attend and graduated from St. Charles College, a Jesuit institution in Grand Coteau, in 1841. He studied law in the office of Cornelius Voorhies in St. Martinville and was admitted to the bar in 1842.

== Career ==
Mouton formed the Lafayete law firm Voorhies & Mouton with Voorhies. In 1846, Mouton was appointed by Governor Isaac Johnson as district attorney of a southwest Louisiana district comprising the Lafayette, St. Landry, Acadia, and Calcasieu parishes and other territory.

Mouton was a Democrat. In 1850, he was elected to the Louisiana State Senate and served one term. His constituency included Lafayette and Vermilion Parish. In 1855, he was elected as lieutenant governor under Governor Robert C. Wickliffe. The two Democratic candidates were dubbed as "Bluegrass Bob and Creole Pony". Mouton was called the "Creole Pony". He resigned from the office on February 26, 1859, due to the senate not allowing his appointment of a conference committee and subsequently electing the committee. In his resignation speech, he stated that the senate had no "confidence in [his] impartiality and capacity [as] presiding officer". After his resignation, he was replaced by William F. Griffin, the president pro tempore of the state senate who completed his unfinished term until 1860. He opposed the Louisiana lottery.

Mouton was selected as judge of the District Court of St. Landry and other parishes. He held office until April 1863, when he closed the courtroom following a call from his first cousin General Alfred Mouton for volunteers. The following month, he enlisted in the Confederate States Army as aide de camp of General Alfred Mouton. He was present at the Battle of Fort Bisland.

Following the war, Mouton worked as a commission merchant in New Orleans. He was barred from practicing law due to the regulations of the federal government. In 1871, Mouton returned to Lafayette and practiced law. He was a leader of the White League and the White Camelia. He was associated with Alcibiades DeBlanc. In 1874, he organized and became president of the Lafayette White League.

In 1878, Mouton moved to St. Martinville. He practiced law there and served as district attorney of St. Martinville and Iberia until 1900. He then returned to Lafayette and practiced law. He was elected as parish attorney and legal advisor of Lafayette's police jury. He served in that role until his death.

== Personal life ==
Mouton married Célimène Dupré, daughter of Lastie Dupré and granddaughter of Louisiana governor Jacques Dupré, of St. Landry Parish in 1850. They had eight children, including A. Emile, Orther C., Julian, Andrew H., Kossuth, Louise, Josephine Eugenie, and Julie. His wife died in 1865. He married Emérenthe "Emerite" Olivier, daughter of St. Maurice Olivier, of St. Martinville in 1867. They had seven children, including Lucy, Homer J., C. Maurice, Philip S., Jerome, Frank T., and Marie. His son Orther was also a lawyer and district judge. His son Julian was a state legislator and judge of the Circuit Court of Appeals. His eldest daughter Louise married judge Conrad Debaillon. His family called him "Homer", but others called him "governor".

In 1848, Mouton built his Shadow Oaks home on his plantation near Lafayette on Sterling Street. A raised cottage of English and French style, the Greek Revival house was designed by architects Paxton and Noillon and it was built using slave labor. The house got its name from surrounding century-old live oak trees. He owned slaves on his plantation prior to the Civil War. During the Civil War, Union General Nathaniel P. Banks occupied the house while passing through. The house was later purchased by Sterling Mudd, nephew of Samuel Mudd. In 1960, the house was added to the National Register.

Mouton died on March 16, 1912, at his home in Lafayette.

Political offices
Preceded by Robert C. Wickliffe	Lieutenant Governor of Louisiana; 1856-1859	Succeeded by William F. Griffin
