= William F. Griffin =

American politician

Member of the Louisiana House of Representatives
- In office 1845–1847
- In office 1850–1851

6th Lieutenant Governor of Louisiana
- In office 1856–1860
- Governor: Robert C. Wickliffe
- Preceded by: Charles Homer Mouton
- Succeeded by: Henry M. Hyams

Personal details
- Party: Democratic

William F. Griffin was an American politician. He served as the sixth lieutenant governor of Louisiana from 1856 to 1860.
