= Robert C. Wickliffe =

American politician (1819–1895)

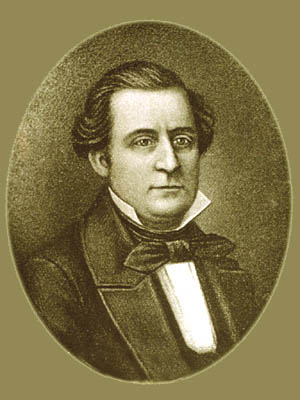

15th Governor of Louisiana
- In office January 22, 1856 – January 23, 1860
- Lieutenant: Charles Homer Mouton; William F. Griffin
- Preceded by: Paul Octave Hebert
- Succeeded by: Thomas Overton Moore

4th Lieutenant Governor of Louisiana
- In office 1854–1856
- Governor: Paul Octave Hebert
- Preceded by: William W. Farmer
- Succeeded by: Charles H. Mouton

Personal details
- Born: January 6, 1819 Bardstown, Kentucky, U.S.
- Died: April 18, 1895 (aged 76) Kentucky, U.S.
- Party: Democratic
- Spouse(s): (1) Anna Dawson (2) Anna Davis Anderson
- Relations: Father of Robert Charles Wickliffe; Son of Charles A. Wickliffe
- Children: Robert Charles Wickliffe
- Education: St. Joseph's College; Augusta College; Centre College

Robert Charles Wickliffe (January 6, 1819 – April 18, 1895) was the fourth lieutenant governor and the 15th governor of Louisiana from 1856 to 1860.

== Early life and education ==
He was born in Bardstown, Kentucky at Wickland to Governor (and later U.S. Postmaster General), Charles A. Wickliffe. His maternal grandfather was the famed Colonel Crips, an Indian fighter in Kentucky. Wickliffe attended several schools including St. Joseph's College in Bardstown and Augusta College. He graduated from Centre College in Danville, Kentucky in 1840 and resided in Washington, DC during his father's tenure as Postmaster General in the Tyler Administration. He studied law under United States Attorney General Hugh S. Legaré and was admitted to the Kentucky bar. "He was the owner of more slaves than any other person in Kentucky and likely anyone in the United States"

== Move to Louisiana ==
In 1843, Wickliffe married Anna Dawson, the daughter of Louisiana Congressman John Bennett Dawson and niece of Louisiana Governor Isaac Johnson. In 1846, the Wickliffes moved to St. Francisville, Louisiana so Robert could recover from pneumonia at his wife's family's plantation, Wyoming.

Wickliffe ran for the Louisiana State Senate in 1851 as a Democrat and won. Reelected in 1853, he is appointed Chairman of the Commission on Public Education, and became President Pro Tempore of the Louisiana Senate when W. W. Farmer became Lieutenant Governor. When Farmer died in office in 1854, Wickliffe, as President Pro Temp, became Lieutenant Governor.

In 1855, Wickliffe was nominated as the Democratic candidate for Governor of Louisiana. He went on to defeat Charles Derbigny, son of former Governor Pierre Derbigny, who was running on the Know Nothing ticket. In winning, Wickliffe drew 3,000 more votes than Derbigny and carried 31 of 48 parishes.

In his inaugural address in Baton Rouge, Governor Wickliffe advocated a united Democratic South to protect state's rights and he championed the expansion of American power to the Caribbean, Mexico, Cuba and Central America in order to protect slavery in the United States. His administration continued the trend of railroad building, but critics claimed he ignored public education. The Panic of 1857 caused unrest and depression throughout the country and Louisiana was hard hit. Governor Wickliffe blamed a loosely managed Board of Currency in Louisiana. As a consequence, he ordered banks to make weekly statements to the Board of Currency. The unrest changed to violence in New Orleans, which was under Know Nothing control, and Wickliffe was forced to dispatch the militia to ensure the validity of the 1858 elections.

After his term as Governor ended, Wickliffe returned to planting and the practice of law in St. Francisville. In the presidential election of 1860, Wickliffe joined Senator Pierre Soulé in backing Stephen A. Douglas. The other Louisiana Senator, John Slidell, backed former Vice President John C. Breckinridge from Kentucky. Wickliffe was selected to be a delegate for Douglas at the Democratic National Convention in Baltimore, Maryland.

In 1861, Wickliffe did not actively support secession and during the Civil War he tried to act as an intermediary between the Confederacy and the Union. After the war was over, in 1865, Wickliffe was elected to the United States House of Representatives representing Louisiana's 3rd congressional district. He was not seated as Louisiana was deemed "not reconstructed."

Wickliffe married his second wife, Anna Davis Anderson in 1870. He was elected a delegate to the Democratic National Convention supporting Samuel J. Tilden in 1876 and in 1884 was delegate supporting Grover Cleveland. In 1892, he reentered electoral politics when he was nominated for Lieutenant Governor by the Louisiana Lottery faction of the Democratic Party. Wickliffe lost to anti-lottery Democrats led by Murphy James Foster. Wickliffe died while visiting relatives in Kentucky on April 18, 1895.

== Sources ==
- State of Louisiana - Biography
- Cemetery Memorial by La-Cemeteries
- Allen, William B. (1872). A History of Kentucky: Embracing Gleanings, Reminiscences, Antiquities, Natural Curiosities, Statistics, and Biographical Sketches of Pioneers, Soldiers, Jurists, Lawyers, Statesmen, Divines, Mechanics, Farmers, Merchants, and Other Leading Men, of All Occupations and Pursuits. Bradley & Gilbert. pp. 357–358.

Party political offices
Preceded by Paul Octave Hébert	Democratic nominee for Governor of Louisiana; 1855	Succeeded by Thomas Overton Moore
Political offices
Preceded by W. W. Farmer	Lieutenant Governor of Louisiana; 1854–1856	Succeeded by Charles Homer Mouton
Preceded by Paul O. Hebert	Governor of Louisiana; 1856–1860	Succeeded by Thomas Overton Moore
