= 1830 Louisiana gubernatorial special election =

- July 7, 1830
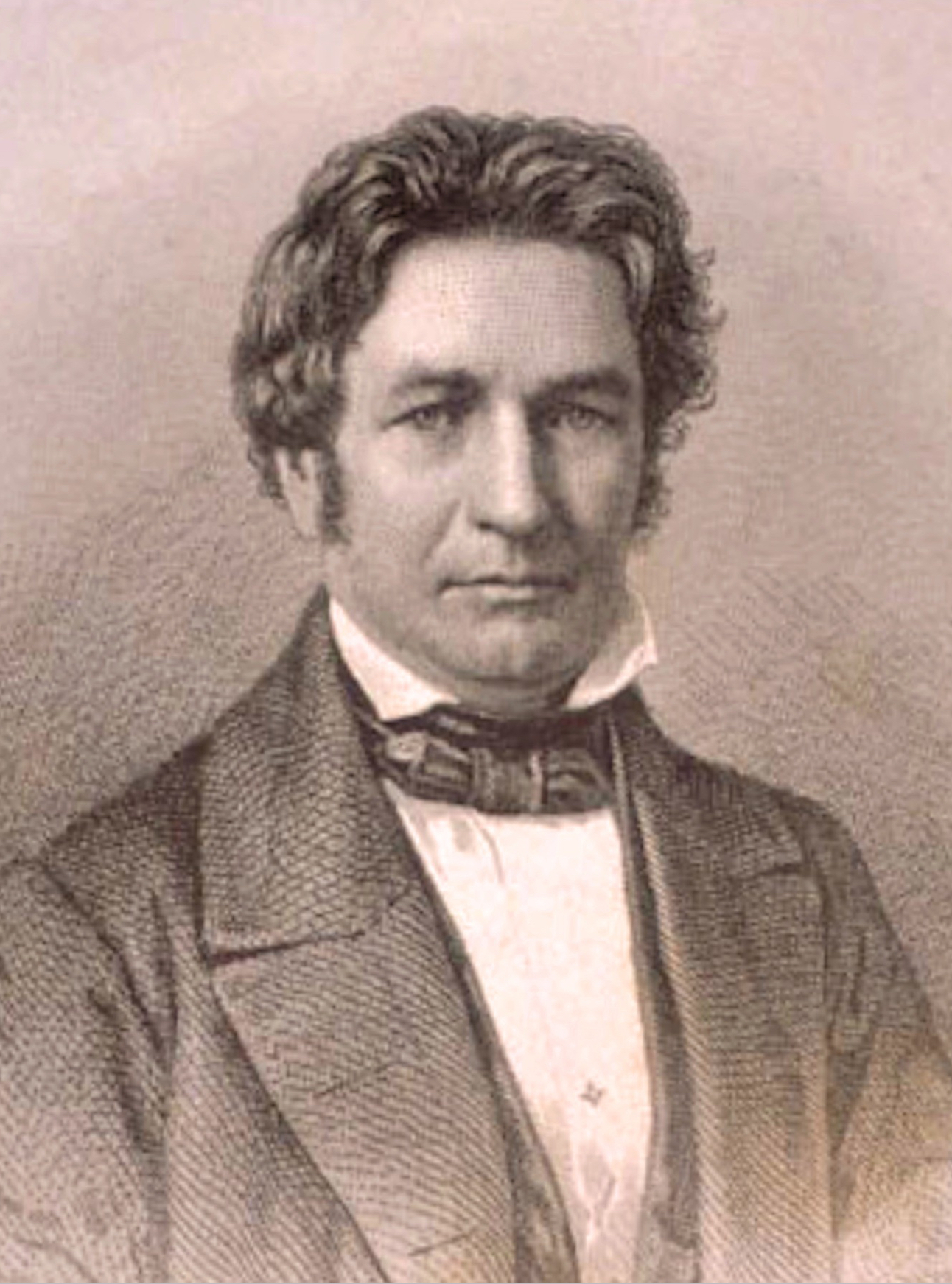

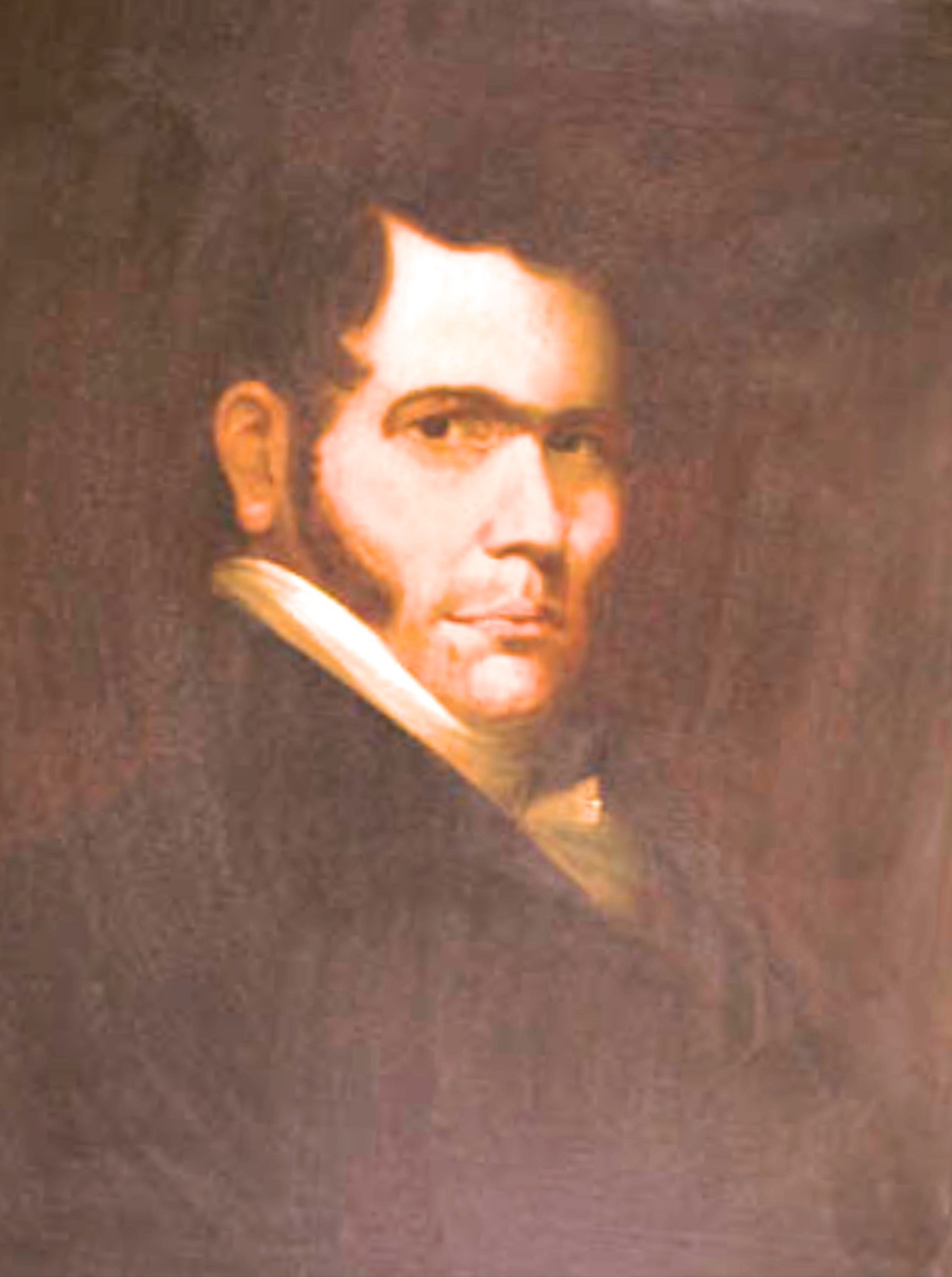
Nominee	Andre B. Roman	W. S. Hamilton	Armand Beauvais
Party	Whig	Democratic	Whig
Popular vote	3,638	2,701	1,478
Percentage	45.49%	33.77%	14.95%
Governor before election
Jacques Dupré
Whig
Elected Governor
Andre B. Roman
Whig

The 1830 Louisiana gubernatorial special election was the sixth gubernatorial election to take place after Louisiana achieved statehood. Under Article III, Sec. 2 of the 1812 Constitution of the State of Louisiana the Governor was elected in two steps. On the first Monday in July, eligible voters went to the polls and voted. The returns were sent to the President of the Louisiana State Senate. On the second day of the session of the Louisiana State Legislature, the Louisiana House of Representatives and Senate met in joint session and voted between the top two candidates. The candidate who received a majority in General Assembly became governor. This particular election was called after the death of Governor Pierre Derbigny.

== Results ==
Popular Vote

Party	Candidate	Votes received	Percentage
Whig	Andre B. Roman	3,638	45.49%
Democratic	W. S. Hamilton	2,701	33.77%
Whig	Armand Beauvais	1,196	14.95%
Democratic	David A. Randall	463	5.79%
Total Vote		7,998	

General Assembly Vote

Candidate	Votes received	Percentage
Andre B. Roman	59	96.72%
Blank	2	3.28%
Total Vote	61	

Preceded by 1828 Louisiana gubernatorial election	Louisiana gubernatorial elections	Succeeded by 1834 Louisiana gubernatorial election
