= George A. Waggaman =

American politician (1782–1843)

George Waggaman
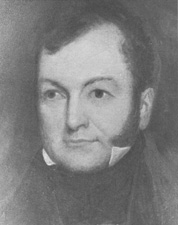

United States Senator from Louisiana
- In office November 15, 1831 – March 4, 1835
- Preceded by: Edward Livingston
- Succeeded by: Robert C. Nicholas

Secretary of State of Louisiana
- In office 1828–1831
- Governor: Pierre Derbigny; Armand Beauvais; Jacques Dupré
- Preceded by: Pierre Derbigny
- Succeeded by: George Eustis Sr.

Personal details
- Born: George Augustus Waggaman; 1782 Caroline County, Maryland
- Died: March 31, 1843 (aged 60–61) New Orleans, Louisiana, U.S.
- Party: National Republican
- Spouse: Marie Arnoult
- Children: 5

Military service
- Allegiance: United States
- Branch/service: United States Army
- Battles/wars: War of 1812

George Augustus Waggaman (1782 – March 31, 1843) was a United States Senator from Louisiana. Born in Caroline County, Maryland, to Henry Waggaman, he completed preparatory studies under private tutors, studied law, and was admitted to the bar in Caroline County in 1811. He served in the War of 1812 under General Andrew Jackson at New Orleans and settled in Baton Rouge, Louisiana, commencing the practice of law in 1813. He was attorney general of the third district of Louisiana in 1813, judge of the third judicial circuit court in 1818, and assistant judge of the criminal court in New Orleans in 1819. He was interested in sugarcane growing and held the office of Secretary of State of Louisiana from 1830 to 1831.

Waggaman was elected as an anti-Jacksonian to the U.S. Senate to fill the vacancy caused by the resignation of Edward Livingston and served from November 15, 1831, to March 4, 1835. He resumed the practice of law in New Orleans and again engaged in sugar cane planting. He participated as a principal in a duel with the former mayor of New Orleans, Denis Prieur, a political adversary, and received injuries from which he died in New Orleans in 1843; interment was in Girod Street Cemetery.

In 1840, Waggaman's daughter Christine eloped with a young Canadian lawyer, John Sandfield Macdonald, who made regular trips to Washington on behalf of the government of Upper Canada as Queen's messenger. She joined Macdonald in Upper Canada. He would go on to be joint Premier of the Province of Canada and the first Premier of Ontario.

== Sources ==
- United States Congress. "George A. Waggaman (id: W000017)". Biographical Directory of the United States Congress.

Political offices
Preceded by Pierre Derbigny	Secretary of State of Louisiana; 1830–1831	Succeeded by George Eustis Sr.
U.S. Senate
Preceded by Edward Livingston	U.S. Senator (Class 2) from Louisiana; 1831–1835; Served alongside: Josiah S. Johnston, Alexander Porter	Succeeded by Robert C. Nicholas
