= 1834 Louisiana gubernatorial election =

- July 9, 1834
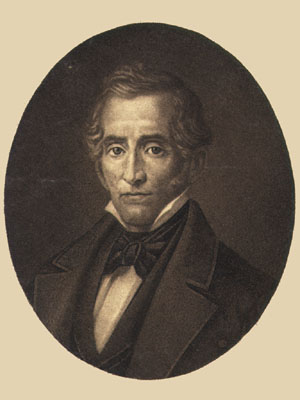

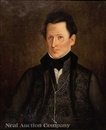
Nominee	Edward D. White	John Bennett Dawson
Party	Whig	Democratic
Electoral vote	58	—
Popular vote	6,973	4,149
Percentage	62.70%	37.30%
Governor before election
Andre B. Roman
Whig
Elected Governor
Edward D. White
Whig

The 1834 Louisiana gubernatorial election was the seventh gubernatorial election to take place after Louisiana achieved statehood. Under Article III Sec 2 of the 1812 Constitution of the State of Louisiana the Governor was elected in two steps. On the first Monday in July, eligible voters went to the polls and voted. The returns were sent to the President of the Louisiana State Senate. On the second day of the session of the Louisiana State Legislature, the Louisiana House of Representatives and Senate met in joint session and voted between the top two candidates. The candidate who received a majority in General Assembly became governor.

== Results ==
Popular Vote

Party	Candidate	Votes received	Percentage
Whig	Edward D. White	6,973	62.70%
Democratic	John Bennett Dawson	4,149	37.30%
Total Vote		11,122	

General Assembly Vote

Candidate	Votes received	Percentage
Edward D. White	58	95.08%
Blank	3	4.92%
Total Vote	61	

Preceded by 1830 Louisiana gubernatorial special election	Louisiana gubernatorial elections	Succeeded by 1838 Louisiana gubernatorial election
