= John David McAdoo =

American judge

- Born: April 4, 1824; Anderson County, Tennessee
- Died: June 16, 1883 (aged 59); Brenham, Texas
- Spouse: Zeralda P. Bugg
- Military career
- Allegiance: Confederate States of America; Texas
- Branch: Confederate States Army; Texas Militia
- Rank: 1st lieutenant (CSA); Brigadier general (Militia)
- Unit: 20th Texas Infantry
- Conflicts: American Civil War
- Other work: Justice of the Texas Supreme Court

John David McAdoo (April 4, 1824 – June 16, 1883) was an American Judge and Military officer who served as a Confederate general during the American Civil War and a justice of the Texas Supreme Court. Born in Tennessee, he graduated from the University of Tennessee in 1848 and passed the bar. He married in 1852, and would become the father of four children.

Moving to Texas in 1854, he continued to practice law and also owned a plantation. At the outbreak of the Civil War, he served as an officer in the 20th Texas Infantry. McAdoo had become a staff officer by 1863, and shortly thereafter was made an assistant adjutant general for state troops. The following year he was promoted to brigadier general and was tasked with defending the frontier from Indian attacks and pursuing army deserters. At war's the end, he became an associate justice of the Texas Supreme Court at the request of governor Edmund J. Davis. He resigned in 1874 to become postmaster of Marshall, finally retiring to farm until his death in Brenham at age 59.

His nephew was politician William Gibbs McAdoo.
