= 1842 Louisiana gubernatorial election =

- July 6, 1842
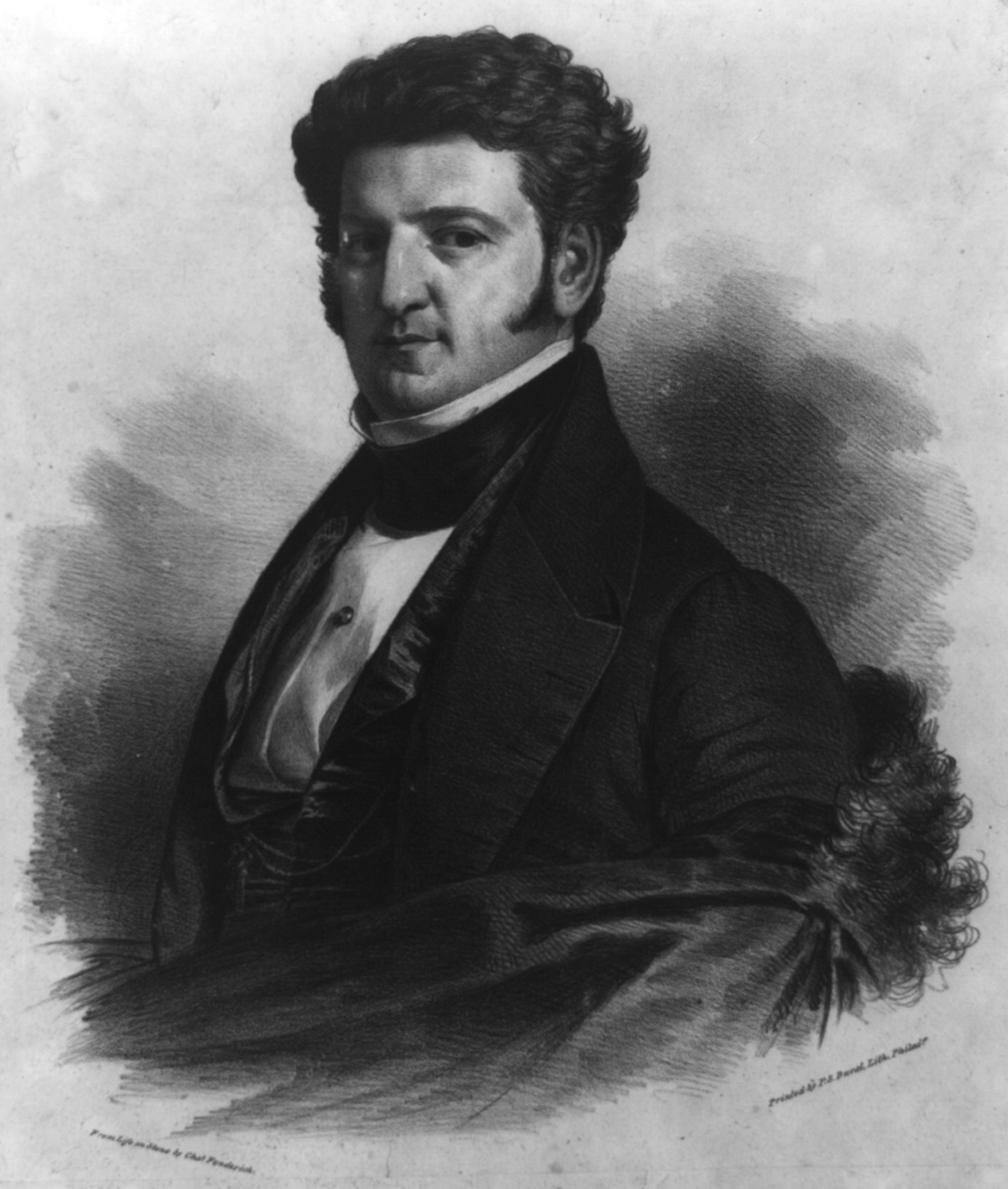

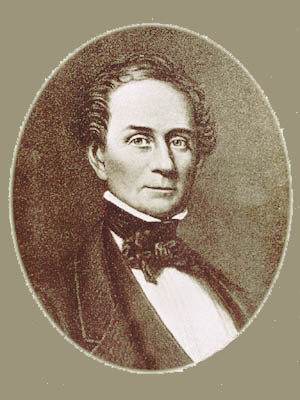
Nominee	Alexandre Mouton	Henry S. Johnson
Party	Democratic	Whig
Electoral vote	60	2
Popular vote	9,669	8,104
Percentage	54.40%	45.60%
Governor before election
Andre B. Roman
Whig
Elected Governor
Alexandre Mouton
Democratic

The 1842 Louisiana gubernatorial election was the ninth gubernatorial election to take place after Louisiana achieved statehood. Under Article III Sec 2 of the 1812 Constitution of the State of Louisiana the Governor was elected in two steps. On the first Monday in July, eligible voters went to the polls and voted. The returns were sent to the President of the Louisiana State Senate. On the second day of the session of the Louisiana State Legislature, the Louisiana House of Representatives and Senate met in joint session and voted between the top two candidates. The candidate who received a majority in General Assembly became governor. This was the last election held under the Constitution of 1812, the next election was held under the Constitution of 1845.

== Results ==
Popular Vote

Party	Candidate	Votes received	Percentage
Democratic	Alexandre Mouton	9,660	54.40%
Whig	Henry S. Johnson	8,104	45.60%
Total Vote		17,773	

General Assembly Vote

Candidate	Votes received	Percentage
Alexandre Mouton	60	85.71%
Henry S. Johnson	2	2.82%
Blank	9	12.68%
Total Vote	71	

Preceded by 1838 Louisiana gubernatorial election	Louisiana gubernatorial elections	Succeeded by 1846 Louisiana gubernatorial election
