= Senator Abercrombie =

Senator Abercrombie may refer to:

- James Abercrombie (congressman) (1792–1861), Alabama State Senate
- John Abercrombie (congressman) (1866–1940), Alabama State Senate
- Leonard A. Abercrombie (1832–1891), Texas State Senate
- Neil Abercrombie (born 1938), Hawaii State Senate
