= Alexander Porter =

American judge (1785–1844)

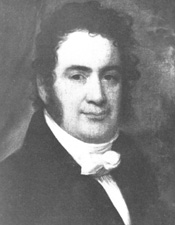

U.S. Senator from Louisiana
- In office December 19, 1833 – January 5, 1837; March 4, 1843 – January 13, 1844 (Note: Was elected by the Louisiana Legislature to serve in the Senate for the term beginning March 4, 1843. Was unable to take his seat due to ill health, and never presented credentials to qualify for the seat. The Senate does not consider him to have served as Senator during this time, and lists a seat vacancy from March 4, 1843 to February 12, 1844.)
- Preceded by: Josiah S. Johnston, Charles Magill Conrad
- Succeeded by: Alexandre Mouton, Henry Johnson

Associate Justice of the Louisiana Supreme Court
- In office 1821–1833
- Preceded by: Pierre Derbigny
- Succeeded by: Henry A. Bullard

Member of the Louisiana House of Representatives
- In office 1816-1818

Personal details
- Born: June 24, 1785 County Donegal, Ireland
- Died: January 13, 1844 (aged 58) St. Mary Parish, Louisiana, U.S.
- Party: National Republican; Whig
- Relatives: James Porter (father); Alexander Porter Goudy (nephew)
- Education: Clemenceau College
- Profession: Politician, lawyer, judge, planter

Alexander Porter (June 24, 1785 – January 13, 1844) was an attorney, politician, and planter, who served as United States Senator from Louisiana from 1833 to 1837. Born in Ireland, he emigrated in 1801 at the age of 16 to the United States. He served a term in the statehouse from 1816 to 1818, and as a state Supreme Court justice from 1821 to 1833. A 1999 paper in the journal Louisiana History described him as a "planter and slave trader."

== Biography ==
=== Early life ===
Porter was born in County Donegal, Ireland. His father, James Porter, a Presbyterian minister and satirist, was executed in July 1798 during the United Irishmen Rebellion of 1798. According to what is described in the Dictionary of National Biography as "a questionable local tradition," the younger Porter was said to have participated in the Battle of Ballynahinch.

Alexander Porter immigrated to the U.S. in 1801 with an uncle, who settled in Nashville, Tennessee. He received a limited schooling, but attended the now-defunct Clemenceau College. He "read the law" as an apprentice and was admitted to the bar in 1807.

=== Career ===
In 1807, he commenced practice in Attakapas Parish, Territory of Orleans. (In 1811, the area around Franklin, Louisiana, became St. Mary Parish.) Porter was a delegate to the convention which framed the first Constitution of Louisiana in 1812. He was elected as a member of the lower branch of the Louisiana Legislature from 1816 to 1818. He married Evalina Baker, daughter of Joshua Baker.

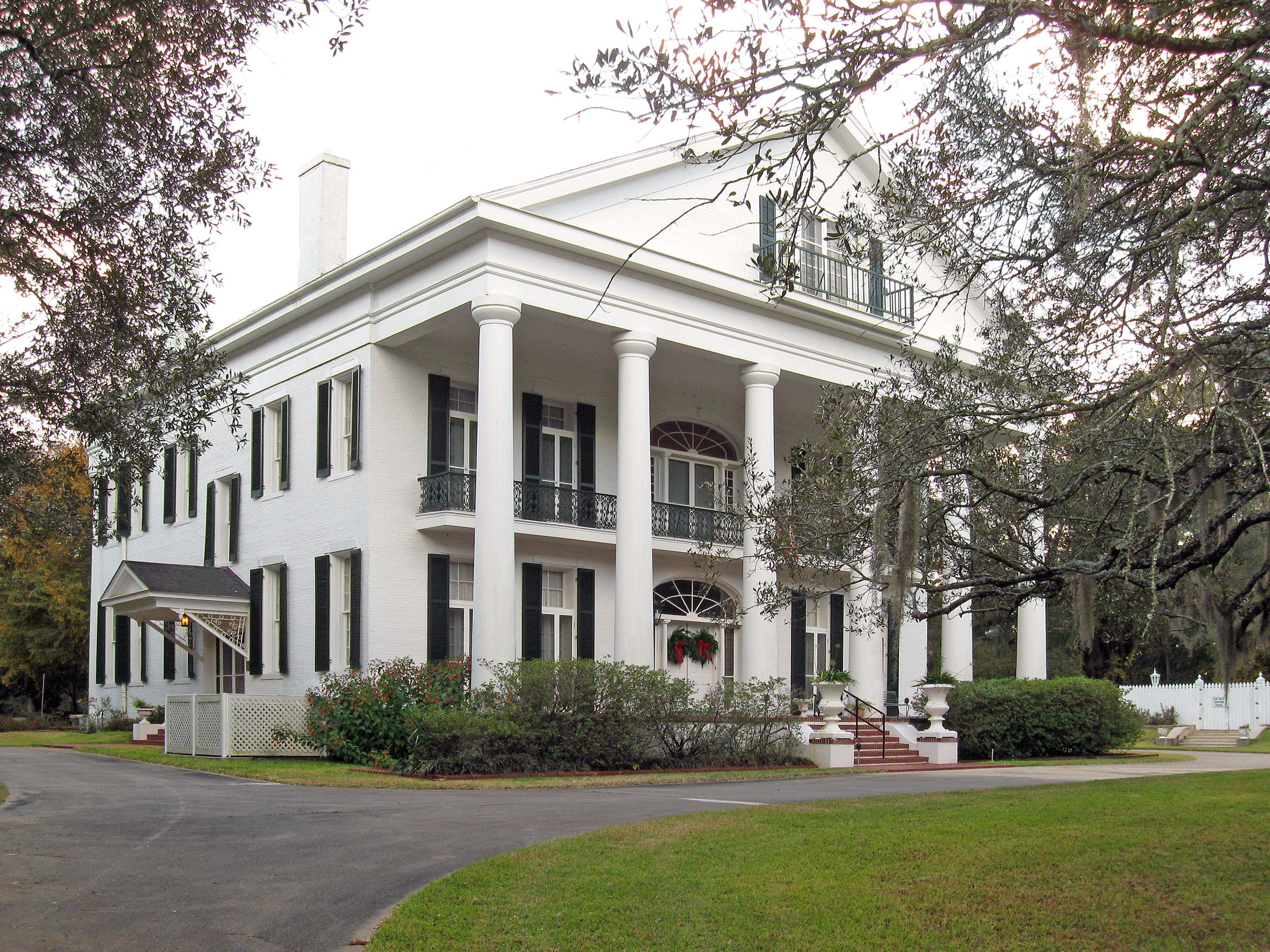
Oaklawn Manor

Alexander Porter served as a Louisiana Supreme Court justice from 1821 to 1833. In 1833, he was selected as a Whig to the United States Senate by the state legislature, to fill the vacancy caused by the death of Josiah S. Johnston. Porter served from December 19, 1833, until January 5, 1837, when he resigned due to ill health.

Porter returned to St. Mary Parish to practice law and manage his plantation, Oaklawn. His plantation was largely staffed by his slaves which, by the 1840s, numbered 320.

He was again chosen by the legislature for the U.S. Senate, for the term beginning March 4, 1843; but he did not take his seat due to poor health. The legislature elected Henry Johnson, former governor of the state, to replace him.

Alexander Porter died in 1844. His remains were interred in Nashville City Cemetery, the location of the grave of his young wife, Evilina (Baker) Porter (1797–1819).

== See also ==
- List of United States senators born outside the United States

== Sources ==
Legal offices
Preceded by Pierre Derbigny	Justice of the Louisiana Supreme Court; 1821–1833	Succeeded by Henry A. Bullard
U.S. Senate
Preceded by Josiah S. Johnston	U.S. senator (Class 3) from Louisiana; December 19, 1833 – January 5, 1837; Served alongside: George A. Waggaman and Robert C. Nicholas	Succeeded by Alexandre Mouton
Preceded by Charles Magill Conrad	U.S. senator (Class 3) from Louisiana; March 4, 1843 – January 13, 1844; Served alongside: Alexander Barrow	Succeeded by Henry Johnson
