= 1838 Louisiana gubernatorial election =

- July 4, 1838
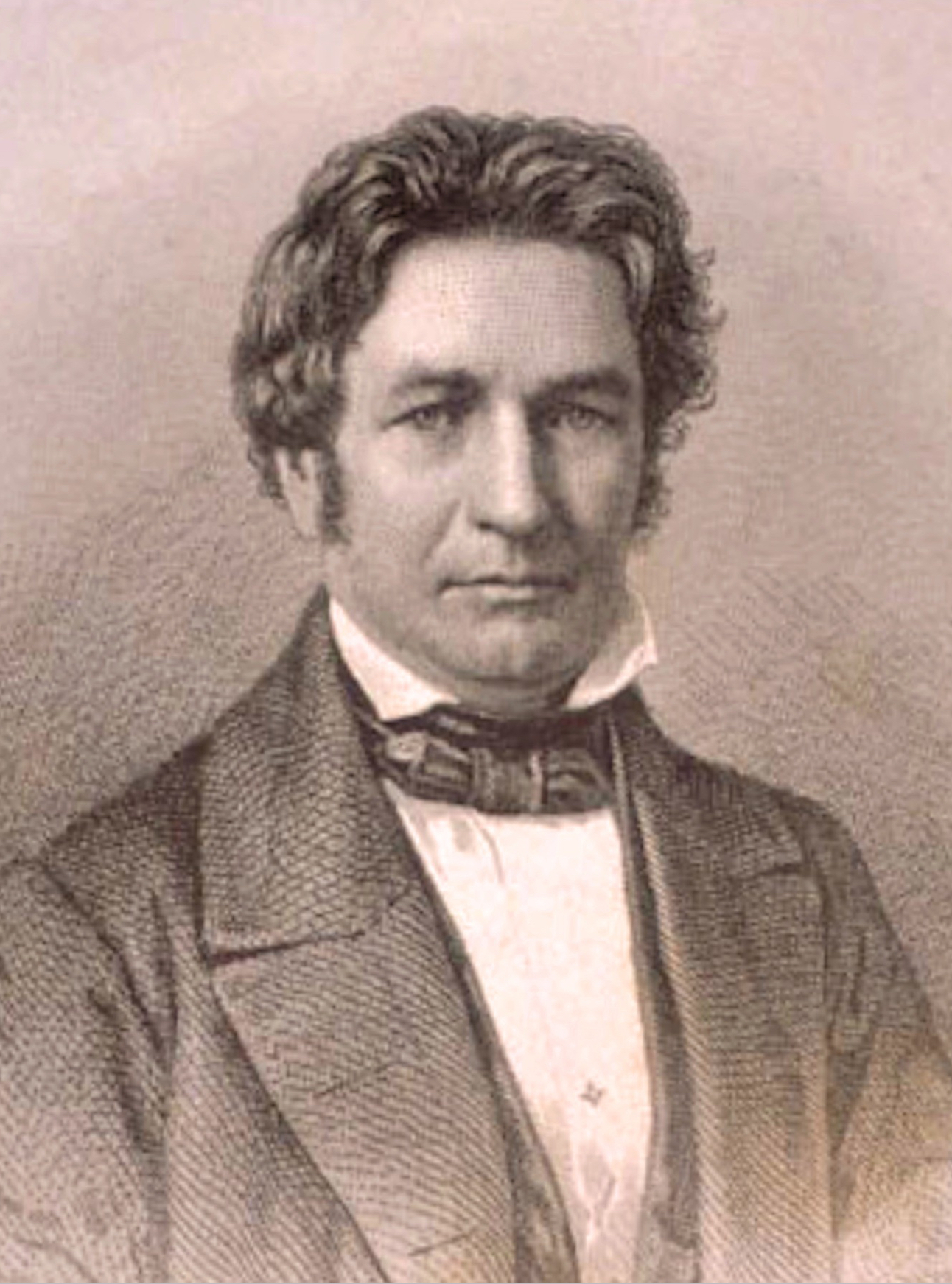

Nominee	Andre B. Roman	Denis Prieur
Party	Whig	Democratic
Electoral vote	49	2
Popular vote	7,590	6,782
Percentage	52.81%	47.19%
Governor before election
Edward D. White
Whig
Elected Governor
Andre B. Roman
Whig

The 1838 Louisiana gubernatorial election was the eighth gubernatorial election to take place after Louisiana achieved statehood. Under Article III Sec 2 of the 1812 Constitution of the State of Louisiana the Governor was elected in two steps. On the first Monday in July, eligible voters went to the polls and voted. The returns were sent to the President of the Louisiana State Senate. On the second day of the session of the Louisiana State Legislature, the Louisiana House of Representatives and Senate met in joint session and voted between the top two candidates. The candidate who received a majority in General Assembly became governor.

== Results ==
Popular Vote

Party	Candidate	Votes received	Percentage
Whig	Andre B. Roman	7,590	52.81%
Democratic	Denis Prieur	6,782	47.19%
Total Vote		14,372	

General Assembly Vote

Candidate	Votes received	Percentage
Andre B. Roman	49	87.50%
Denis Prieur	2	3.57%
Blank	5	8.93%
Total Vote	56	

Preceded by 1834 Louisiana gubernatorial election	Louisiana gubernatorial elections	Succeeded by 1842 Louisiana gubernatorial election
