= 1846 Louisiana gubernatorial election =

- January 5, 1846
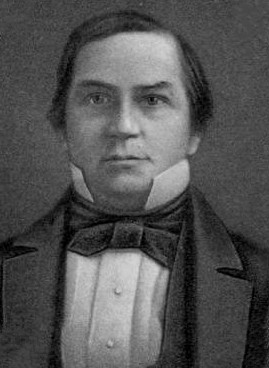

Nominee	Isaac Johnson	Guillaume DeBuys
Party	Democratic	Whig
Popular vote	12,629	10,138
Percentage	54.05%	43.39%
Parish Results
Johnson
50–60%
60–70%
70–80%
80–90%
90–100%
DeBuys
50–60%
60–70%
70–80%
No Data
Governor before election
Alexandre Mouton
Democratic
Elected Governor
Isaac Johnson
Democratic

The 1846 Louisiana gubernatorial election was the first of two elections to take place under the Louisiana Constitution of 1845. The new constitution abolished the provision in the 1812 constitution that required a gubernatorial candidate to win a vote of the legislature to get elected, leaving the final decision up to the people. The new constitution also cut incumbent Governor Alexandre Mouton's term short by one year thus moving the election from July 1846 to January 1846 with the inauguration of the new governor in February.

== Results ==
Popular Vote

Party	Candidate	Votes received	Percentage
Democratic	Isaac Johnson	12,629	54.05%
Whig	Guillaume DeBuys	10,138	43.39%
Native American	Charles Derbigny	598	2.56%
Total Vote		23,365	

Preceded by 1842 Louisiana gubernatorial election	Louisiana gubernatorial elections	Succeeded by 1849 Louisiana gubernatorial election
