= John Bennett Dawson =

American politician (1798–1845)

J. Bennett Dawson
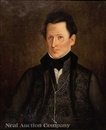

Member of the U.S. House of Representatives from Louisiana
- In office March 4, 1841 – June 26, 1845
- Preceded by: Thomas W. Chinn (2nd); John Moore (3rd)
- Succeeded by: Alcée L. la Branche (2nd); John H. Harmanson
- Constituency: 2nd district (1841-43); 3rd district (1843-45)

Member of the Louisiana House of Representatives
- In office 1823-1824

Personal details
- Born: John Bennett Dawson; March 17, 1798 Nashville, Tennessee, US
- Died: June 26, 1845 (aged 47) St. Francisville, Louisiana, US
- Resting place: Grace Episcopal churchyard in St. Francisville, Louisiana
- Party: Democratic
- Spouse: Margaret Johnson
- Profession: Planter

John Bennett Dawson (March 17, 1798 – June 26, 1845) was an American politician who served two terms as a Democrat in the United States House of Representatives from the state of Louisiana from 1841 to 1845.

== Early life ==
Born near Nashville, Tennessee on March 17, 1798, he went to Centre College in Danville, Kentucky. He moved to Louisiana and became a planter residing at Wyoming Plantation; he was also interested in the newspaper business. He married Margaret Johnson and together they had four children. His daughter Anna Ruffin Dawson married Robert C. Wickliffe who would serve as Lieutenant Governor and Governor of Louisiana in the 1850s.

== Political career ==
From 1823 to 1824, Dawson was a member of the Louisiana House of Representatives representing Feliciana Parish.

He unsuccessfully ran for Louisiana Governor in 1834, He was defeated by Whig candidate Edward D. White.

=== Congress ===
In 1840, Dawson was elected as a Democrat representing the Second District in the 27th Congress. He was re-elected in 1842 and represented the Third District in the 28th Congress. He served from March 4, 1841, until his death on June 26, 1845. He defeated James M. Elam (Whig) in the election of 1843.

He served as major-general in the State militia, judge of the parish court in West Feliciana Parish, and U.S. postmaster at New Orleans from April 10, 1843, until December 19, 1843.

Dawson was known for his threats of violence, particularly on the topic of slavery. He once "threatened to cut a colleague’s throat ‘from ear to ear.’" On separate occasions, he drew a Bowie knife on and raised a cocked pistol at the anti-slavery congressman Joshua R. Giddings. John Quincy Adams described him as a "drunken bully."

== Death ==
Dawson died on June 26, 1845. His remains were interred in Grace Episcopal churchyard in St. Francisville, Louisiana. His successor in Congress, John H. Harmanson, eulogized him on the floor of the House, but not without noting his "faults — some thought grave faults."

== See also ==
- List of members of the United States Congress who died in office (1790–1899)

Party political offices
Preceded by W. S. Hamilton	Democratic nominee for Governor of Louisiana; 1834	Succeeded by Denis Prieur
U.S. House of Representatives
Preceded by Thomas Withers Chinn	Member of the U.S. House of Representatives from Louisiana's 2nd congressional district 1841 – 1843	Succeeded by Alcée Louis la Branche
Preceded by John Moore	Member of the U.S. House of Representatives from Louisiana's 3rd congressional district 1843 – 1845	Succeeded by John Henry Harmanson
