= Charles Genois =

American politician

Charles Genois (c. 1793 – August 30, 1866) was the Mayor of New Orleans from May 1838 to May 1840. Genois's brief tenure has been characterized as feeble because of an economically stagnant period which followed the boom of his predecessor's term. "It was, however, a model of efficiency and unswerving integrity." Genois's administration dealt with the consequences of the city's heavy borrowing; reforms and improvements were postponed.

A major public event of Mayor Genois's term was the January 1840 dedication of the cornerstone for a planned Jackson monument, in the presence of former President Andrew Jackson. The President's visit was occasioned by the 25th anniversary of the Battle of New Orleans.

Charles Genois is buried in New Orleans, Louisiana, in St. Louis Cemetery No. 2.

Preceded by Denis Prieur	Mayor of New Orleans; 1838–1840	Succeeded by William Freret
