= Thomas W. Chinn =

American politician

Member of the U.S. House of Representatives from Louisiana's 2nd district
- In office March 4, 1839 – March 3, 1841
- Preceded by: Eleazer Wheelock Ripley
- Succeeded by: John Bennett Dawson

Personal details
- Born: Thomas Withers Chinn; November 20, 1791 Cynthiana, Kentucky
- Died: May 22, 1852 (aged 60) West Baton Rouge Parish, Louisiana
- Resting place: Magnolia Cemetery in Baton Rouge
- Party: Whig

Thomas Withers Chinn (November 20, 1791 – May 22, 1852) was a member of the U. S. House of Representatives representing the state of Louisiana, serving one term as a Whig from 1839 to 1841.

He was also U.S. minister to the Two Sicilies.

== Biography ==
Chinn was born in Cynthiana, Kentucky, in Harrison County and later moved to Louisiana. His birthplace was a log cabin built in a triangular shape, which was called a "three-face camp." He was a founding board member of the Metairie Race Course.

=== Death ===
He died on his plantation in West Baton Rouge Parish. He is now buried in Magnolia Cemetery in Baton Rouge.

U.S. House of Representatives
Preceded by Eleazer Wheelock Ripley	Member of the U.S. House of Representatives from Louisiana's 2nd congressional district 1839 – 1841	Succeeded by John Bennett Dawson
