= Leonard A. Abercrombie =

American politician (1832–1891)

Leonard Anderson Abercrombie
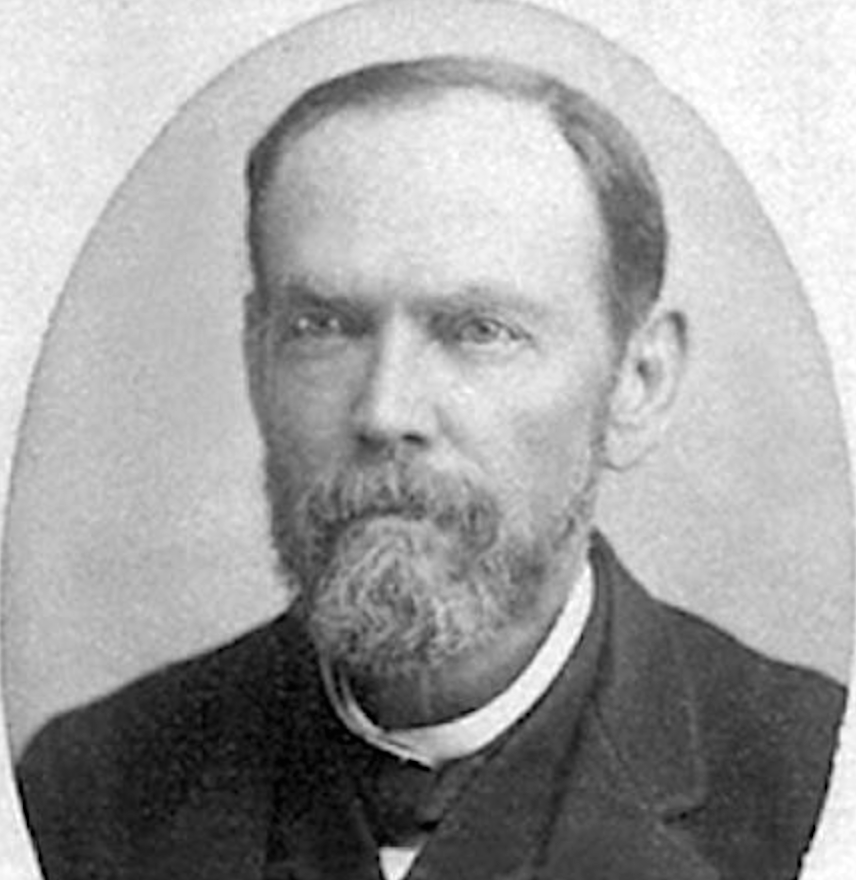

Texas Senate, District 9
- In office November 1886 – 1887

Texas Senate, District 9
- In office 1887–1888

Personal details
- Born: December 1, 1832 Macon County, Alabama, U.S.
- Died: December 23, 1891 (aged 59) Philadelphia, Pennsylvania, U.S.
- Party: Democratic
- Spouse: Lavinia Afton Chilton (m. 1860–1891; his death)
- Relations: Robert S. Lovett (son-in-law); Robert A. Lovett (grandson)
- Children: 7
- Occupation: Politician, lawyer, secessionist delegate, military officer

Military service
- Allegiance: Confederate States
- Rank: lieutenant colonel
- Battles/wars: American Civil War

Leonard Anderson Abercrombie (December 1, 1832 – December 23, 1891) was an American politician, lawyer, secessionist delegate and military officer. He served as a Texas senator, and Confederate army officer.

== Early life and education ==
Leonard Anderson Abercrombie was born on December 1, 1832, in Macon County, Alabama, to parents Sarah Lee (née Haden) and Milo Bolling Abercrombie.

He was educated in Alexandria, Virginia, and in Tuskegee, Alabama; and was admitted to the bar in 1854.

== Career and late life ==
Abercrombie moved to Madison County, Texas in 1854, followed by a move to Huntsville, Texas in 1856. In 1860 he was elected prosecuting attorney for multiple counties in Texas, including Harris County, Galveston County, Grimes County, and Walker County.

He married Lavinia Afton Chilton in 1860, and together they had 7 children.

Abercrombie was a delegate of Walker County at the Texas state Secession Convention, from January 28 until February 4, 1861.

During the American Civil War (1861–1865), Abercrombie was the lieutenant colonel of Col. Henry M. Elmore's 20th Texas Infantry Regiment. He served only within the state of Texas, and participated in the Battle of Galveston in 1863.

After the American Civil War ended in 1865, Abercrombie reinstated his legal practice in the city of Huntsville, Texas. He was elected in November 1886 as a state senator to represent district 9, in the 20th Texas Legislature. He was reelected in 1887 to the 21st Texas Legislature.

== Death ==
Abercrombie died on December 23, 1891, at Philadelphia, Pennsylvania. He was interred at Oakwood Cemetery in Huntsville, Texas.
