= Alexandre Mouton =

American politician (1804–1885)

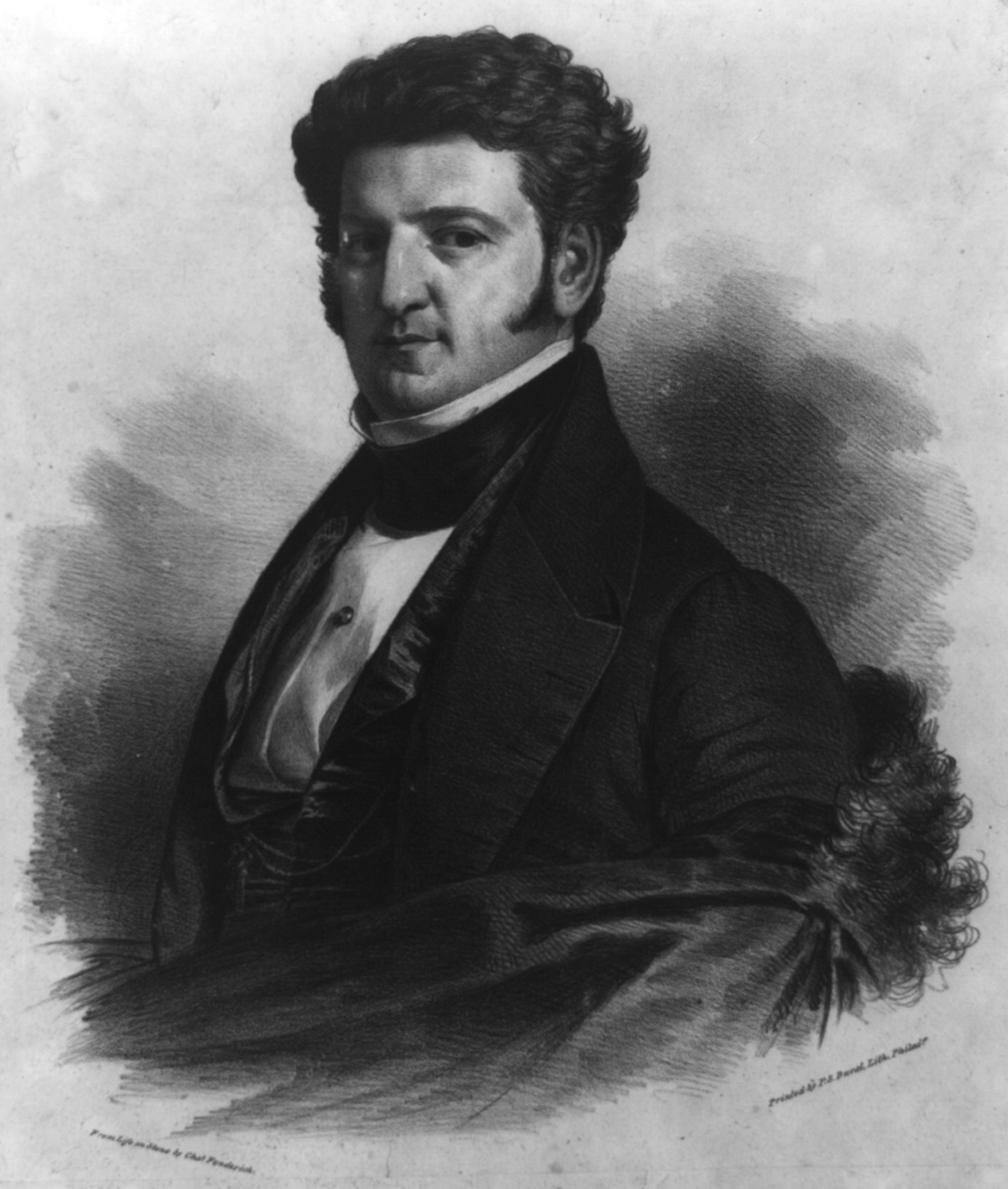

11th Governor of Louisiana
- In office January 30, 1843 – February 12, 1846
- Preceded by: Andre B. Roman
- Succeeded by: Isaac Johnson

United States Senator from Louisiana
- In office January 12, 1837 – March 1, 1842
- Preceded by: Alexander Porter
- Succeeded by: Charles M. Conrad

Speaker of the Louisiana House of Representatives
- In office 1831–1832
- Preceded by: Andre B. Roman
- Succeeded by: Alcée Louis la Branche

Member of the Louisiana House of Representatives
- In office 1836–1837
- In office 1827–1832

Personal details
- Born: November 19, 1804 Attakapas County, Territory of Orleans
- Died: February 12, 1885 (aged 80) Lafayette, Louisiana
- Resting place: St. John's Cemetery
- Party: Democratic
- Spouse(s): (1) Zelia Rousseau (2) Emma Kitchell Gardner
- Children: 11, including Alfred
- Education: Georgetown University

Alexandre Mouton (November 19, 1804 – February 12, 1885) was a Cajun planter and politician who served as the first Democratic Governor of Louisiana from 1843 to 1846. He previously served in the Louisiana State Legislature, as U.S. Senator of Louisiana, and led the 1845 State constitutional convention which abolished property qualifications to vote or hold public office.

Mouton served as President of the Louisiana Secession Convention in 1861, declaring Louisiana a “free, sovereign, and independent power” before it joined the Confederate States of America two months later.

== Early life ==
Alexandre Mouton was born in Attakapas district (now Lafayette Parish) to Marie Marthe Bordat and Jean Mouton, both descendants of Acadian exiles. His father was the founder of the town of Vermilionville. He attended local schools, graduated from Georgetown College, and also studied law under Charles Antoine and Edward Simon of St. Martinville. After being admitted to the bar in 1835, he began his law practice in Lafayette Parish and was a founder of the Union Bank of Louisiana.

Mouton owned the 2,100 acre Île Copal sugar cane plantation in Lafayette which was worked by 120 slaves.

He married Zelia Rousseau, the granddaughter of Governor Jacques Dupré, in 1826; they had 5 children before her death in 1837, one of whom died in infancy. In 1842, he married Emma Kitchell Gardner; this marriage produced eight children, six of whom survived to adulthood.

== Political career ==
Mouton was elected to the Louisiana House of Representatives in 1827 and became Speaker from 1831 to 1832. He was a presidential elector on the Democratic ticket in the 1828, 1832, and 1836 Presidential elections and was an unsuccessful candidate for election in 1830 to the Twenty-second Congress. In 1836 he was again elected as a member of the State House of Representatives but resigned a year later to fulfill a vacancy in the U.S. Senate.

After Senator Alexander Porter resigned due to ill health, Mouton was elected to the U.S. Senate to fill his vacancy. He was re-elected to another term, serving from January 12, 1837, until his resignation on March 1, 1842. While in the Senate he was chairman of the Committee on Agriculture.

=== Term as Governor ===
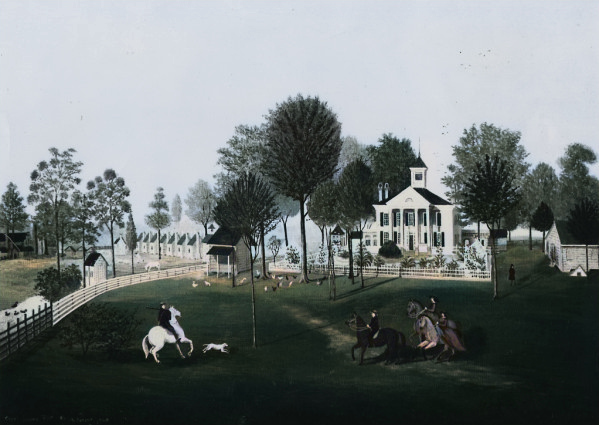
Île Copal Plantation located near Lafayette.

Mouton won the 1842 Louisiana Gubernatorial Election becoming the first Democratic candidate to become governor of the state. He reduced expenditures and liquidated state assets to balance the budget and meet bond obligations without raising taxes. He sold state-owned steamboats, equipment, land, and slaves used to remove the Red River Raft in 1834 under Governor Roman. The revenue from the sale of public lands went to funding public education, but all other income went to paying off the state debt. He opposed all expenditures for internal improvements and leased out state penitentiary labor and equipment.

In 1845, he led the constitutional convention which removed property qualifications for suffrage and office holding, and the election of all local officials and most judges. The new constitution also called for the state legislature to begin a system for public education.

After his term as Governor, Mouton continued his political career. He was president of the Southwestern Railroad Convention in New Orleans in 1852 and also served as the leader of the Louisiana delegation to the 1860 Democratic National Convention. Elected as the President of the Louisiana Secession Convention held in Baton Rouge in 1861; Mouton led the vote to pass the Ordinance of Secession.

After two months of independence, Louisiana officially joined the Confederate States after which Mouton ran an unsuccessful campaign for Confederate Senate. During the Civil War, Mouton was arrested after Union troops occupied his plantation and used it as a headquarters. The sugar refinery was burned and all of his slave workers were freed. His son Alfred Mouton served as a General in the Confederate Army and was killed in action during the Battle of Mansfield. His daughter married Confederate Major General Franklin Gardner, whose older sister became his own second wife. After the end of the war, he returned to being a sugar planter. He died in Lafayette on February 12, 1885. He is buried in the cemetery at St. John's Cathedral.

== Sources ==
Party political offices
Preceded by Denis Prieur	Democratic nominee for Governor of Louisiana; 1842	Succeeded by Isaac Johnson
U.S. House of Representatives
Preceded by Andre B. Roman	Speaker of the Louisiana House of Representatives; Alexandre Mouton; 1831–1832	Succeeded by Alcée Louis la Branche
U.S. Senate
Preceded by Alexander Porter	U.S. senator (Class 3) from Louisiana; 1837–1842; Served alongside: Robert C. Nicholas, Alexander Barrow	Succeeded by Charles M. Conrad
Political offices
Preceded by Andre B. Roman	Governor of Louisiana; 1843–1846	Succeeded by Isaac Johnson
