= William Freret =

American politician

William Alfred Freret Sr. (1804 – June 14, 1864) was Mayor of New Orleans from May 10, 1840, to April 4, 1842, and again from February 27, 1843, to May 12, 1844.

He was born in New Orleans, and was of mixed English and French descent; his father was an English merchant who settled in New Orleans and married a Creole woman. His father built on the boy's natural mechanical talent and sent him to Europe to be educated in engineering and the mechanical arts.

He returned to New Orleans and eventually succeeded his father in the business of compressing cotton for shipment abroad. Under his direction, the Freret Cotton Press Company became the first large industrial firm in New Orleans; thereby propelling him to public visibility and a political career. Despite his mixed European heritage, he joined the Native American Party, a new political group that sought to limit the influence on public affairs of Creoles and other groups viewed as "foreign." Under its banner, he won the 1840 mayoral election, with 1,051 votes to the 942 of his predecessor Charles Genois.

Freret had a meticulous temperament; he was a hands-on administrator known for his surprise inspections of city facilities. His term was marked by the continuation of the city's recovery from the combined effects of the borrowing and spending of previous mayors and the nationwide economic crisis of 1837. He succeeded in establishing a free public school system and obtaining backing for it at the state level.

At the expiration of his term he ran for re-election but lost to Denis Prieur, a former mayor; who, however, was mayor for only eight months, resigning to take a state office. Freret was elected, this time as a Whig, to serve the remainder of Prieur's term. He ran for a third term in the elections of 1844; but they seem to have been marked by widespread fraud. In any case, he lost to Joseph Edgard Montegut.

In 1850, he was appointed Collector of the Port of New Orleans by President Zachary Taylor.

William Freret's remains were interred in New Orleans' St. Patrick Cemetery. The city's Freret Street was named for him.

Preceded by Charles Genois	Mayor of New Orleans; 1840–1842	Succeeded by Denis Prieur
Preceded by Denis Prieur	Mayor of New Orleans; 1843–1844	Succeeded by Joseph Edgard Montegut
