= Isaac Johnson (politician) =

American politician (1803–1853)

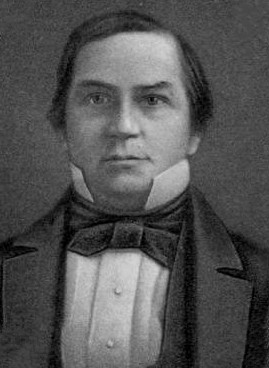

12th Governor of Louisiana
- In office February 12, 1846 – January 28, 1850
- Lieutenant: Trasimond Landry
- Preceded by: Alexandre Mouton
- Succeeded by: Joseph M. Walker

Attorney General of Louisiana
- In office 1850–1853
- Governor: Joseph Marshall Walker; Paul Octave Hébert
- Preceded by: William Augustus Elmore
- Succeeded by: Isaac Edward Morse

Member of the Louisiana House of Representatives

Personal details
- Born: November 1, 1803 near St. Francisville, Spanish West Florida
- Died: March 15, 1853 (aged 49) New Orleans, Louisiana, U.S.
- Party: Democratic
- Spouse: Charlotte McDermott
- Children: 3

Isaac Johnson (November 1, 1803 – March 15, 1853) was an American politician who served as the 12th Governor of the state of Louisiana. He began his term shortly after the passage of the 1845 state constitution and sought to uphold its provision to eliminate property qualifications for voting or holding public office. He was a strong proponent of public education, supported the annexation of western territories, and pushed for moving the state capital from New Orleans to Baton Rouge.

== Early life ==
Isaac Johnson was born on Troy Plantation in New Feliciana, Spanish West Florida, on November 1, 1803, to John Hunter Johnson and Thenia Munson Johnson. His grandfather, Isaac Johnson, migrated to the area from Britain in the 1770s and played a leading role in the West Florida Rebellion. Johnson was taught by private tutors and read law with his uncle in St. Francisville, eventually joining his uncle's law firm as a partner in 1828. He married Charlotte McDermott that same year with whom he had three children.

== Political career ==
In 1833 Johnson was elected to the Louisiana House of Representatives, where he served on the Judiciary Committee. He also served on various committees in New Feliciana, including one to counteract the actions of abolitionists and another to protect the parish from robbers and vagrants. In 1839, Johnson was appointed judge of the Third Judicial District and appointed secretary of state by Governor Alexandre Mouton. Johnson quickly resigned to avoid the threat of yellow fever in New Orleans, then the state capital.

=== Term as Governor ===
Nominated by the Democratic Party to run for governor in 1846 election, Johnson defeated Whig candidate Guillaume DeBuys. Johnson won by almost 2,500 votes and assumed the office of governor at the age of 43. He supported the new state constitution of 1845, which abolished the property qualification for voting and/or holding public office and directed the legislature to create a public school system. He called for a special legislative session which appropriated $550,000 for public school funding.

On May 4, 1846, Johnson called out the Louisiana militia in a proclamation, sending several regiments to serve under General Zachary Taylor in the Mexican American War. He denounced the Wilmot Proviso which sought to prohibit the extension of slavery into areas annexed from Mexico.

Johnson angered members of the Democratic Party after he appointed multiple Whig candidates to various offices. Although the party had seen a surge in support under the leadership of Party Boss John Slidell, Johnson fell out of favor with Democratic leadership for his nonpartisanship.

In 1849, the state capitol was moved from New Orleans to Baton Rouge after Johnson signed a bill officially moving it. The following year, Governor Johnson did not run for reelection. His successor, Joseph Marshall Walker, appointed him as Attorney General of Louisiana. While running for a position on the State Supreme Court, Johnson died of a heart attack at the Verandah Hotel in New Orleans on March 15. He was buried at Troy Plantation in West Feliciana Parish.

== Sources ==
Party political offices
Preceded by Alexandre Mouton	Democratic nominee for Governor of Louisiana; 1846	Succeeded by Joseph Marshall Walker
Political offices
Preceded by Alexandre Mouton	Governor of Louisiana; 1846–1850	Succeeded by Joseph M. Walker
Legal offices
Preceded by William Augustus Elmore	Attorney General of Louisiana; 1850–1853	Succeeded by Isaac Edward Morse
