= Henry Goudy =

Irish jurist (1848–1921)

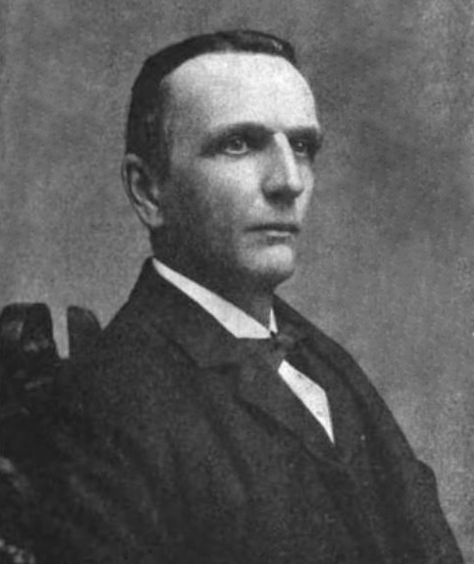
- Portrait of Henry Goudy, published in the Scots Law Times on 8 July 1893
- Born: 16 September 1848; Strabane, County Tyrone
- Died: 3 March 1921 (aged 72); Bath, England
- Education: Master of Arts (Edinburgh); Bachelor of Laws (Edinburgh); Doctor of Laws (Edinburgh); Doctor of Civil Law (Oxford)
- Occupation: Jurist

Henry Goudy (16 September 1848 - 3 March 1921) was an Irish jurist. After practicing at the Scottish bar he was professor of civil law at the University of Edinburgh for four years, before spending more than 25 years as the University of Oxford's Regius Professor of Civil Law.

== Biography ==
Goudy was born in Strabane, County Tyrone, on 16 September 1848. His mother, Isabella Kinross, was the daughter of an Ayr merchant. His father, Alexander Porter Goudy, was a Presbyterian minister in Strabane from 1833 until his death in 1858. Henry Goudy was educated at the University of Glasgow before taking the degrees of Master of Arts and Bachelor of Laws at the University of Edinburgh. Goudy would later be made an honorary Doctor of Laws by the University of Edinburgh. He studied at the University of Königsberg from 1871 to 1872 before returning to Scotland and qualifying as an advocate in November 1872.

In 1889, Goudy took up the University of Edinburgh's chair of civil law. Four years later, he would become the Regius Professor of Civil Law at the University of Oxford. He gave his inaugural lecture at Oxford on 'The Fate of the Roman Law North and South of the Tweed'. Goudy never married, and accordingly lived in All Souls College, of which he was a fellow by virtue of his professorship. His eventual successor, Professor Francis de Zulueta eulogised Goudy as 'a most lovable companion' in college, who 'had the secret of making friends with younger men'. The year after taking up his professorship, in 1894, Goudy was awarded the degree of Doctor of Civil Law by the University of Oxford.

Goudy founded the Society of Public Teachers of Law in 1908, of which he was the first president (an office he took up again in 1918). In 1915 he would co-found the Grotius Society, serving as its inaugural vice-president and becoming president in 1917.

Goudy resigned as Regius Professor on grounds of health in 1919, though he remained a fellow of All Souls and was granted the status of emeritus professor by the university. He died in Bath on 3 March 1921, leaving an estate worth £15,833, 18 shillings, and sixpence.
