= 56th New York Infantry Regiment =

56th New York Infantry Regiment 10th Legion
- Active: October 15, 1861 - October 17, 1865
- Country: United States
- Allegiance: Union
- Branch: Union Army
- Type: Infantry
- Engagements: Siege of Yorktown; Battle of Williamsburg; Battle of Seven Pines; Seven Days Battles; Battle of Gaines's Mill; Battle of Bottom's Bridge; Battle of White Oak Swamp; Battle of Malvern Hill; Second Battle of Charleston Harbor; Battle of Honey Hill; Battle of Tulifinny; Battle of Deveaux’s Neck; Battle of Coosawhatchie; Battle of Dingle’s Mills

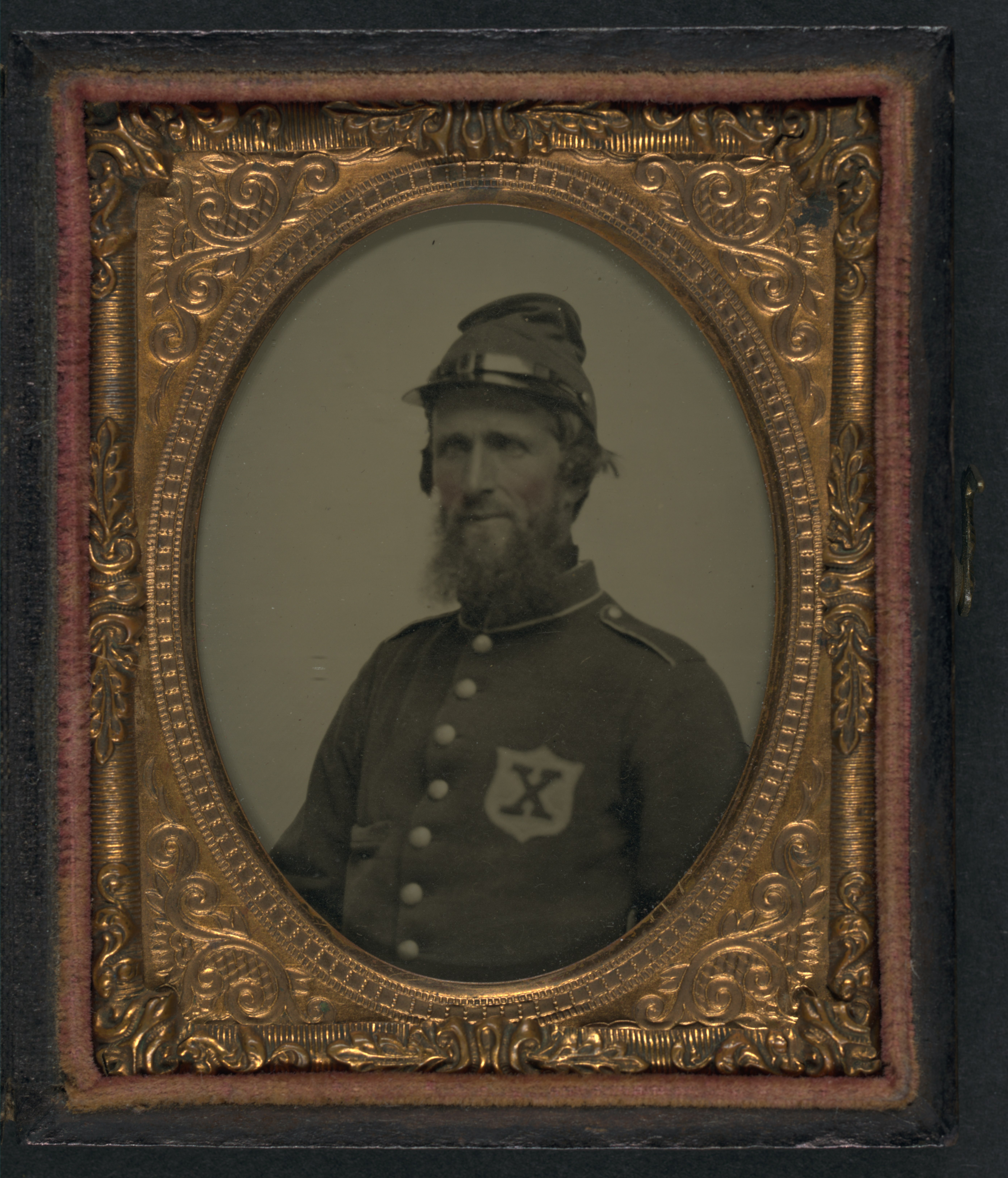
:Unidentified soldier of the 56th New York Volunteers (10th Legion)

The 56th New York Infantry Regiment, also known as 10th Legion, was an infantry regiment in the Union Army during the American Civil War.

== Service ==
The 56th New York Infantry was organized at Newburgh, New York October 15, 1861 and mustered in October 28, 1861 under the command of Colonel Charles Henry Van Wyck. The regiment initially consisted of eleven companies of infantry, two light batteries, and two troops of cavalry, the whole being known as the "10th Legion". The light batteries became the 7th and 8th Independent New York Batteries, and the two troops of cavalry were assigned to the 1st New York Mounted Rifles. The eleventh company of infantry became known as 5th Company, New York Sharpshooters.

The regiment was attached to 1st Brigade, Casey's Division, Army of the Potomac, to March 1862. 1st Brigade, 3rd Division, IV Corps, Army of the Potomac, to June 1862. 1st Brigade, 2nd Division, IV Corps, to December 1862. Naglee's Brigade, Department of North Carolina, to January 1863. 2nd Brigade, 3rd Division, XVIII Corps, Department of North Carolina, January 1863. 2nd Brigade, 2nd Division, XVIII Corps, Department of the South, to April 1863. Stephenson's Brigade, Seabrook Island, South Carolina, X Corps, Department of the South, to July 1863. 2nd Brigade, 1st Division, Morris Island, South Carolina, X Corps, July 1863. Davis' Brigade, Folly Island, South Carolina, X Corps, to August 1863. Saxton's Division, District of Beaufort, South Carolina, X Corps, to April 1864. District of Beaufort, South Carolina, Northern District, Department of the South, to November 1864. 1st Brigade, Coast Division, Department of the South, to January 1865. 1st Separate Brigade, Morris Island, South Carolina, Department of the South, to March 1865. 4th Separate Brigade, Department of the South, to July 1865. 2nd Sub-District, District of Western South Carolina, to September 1865.

The 56th New York Infantry mustered out October 17, 1865 at Charleston, South Carolina.

== Detailed service ==
Left New York for Washington, D.C., November 7, 1861. Duty in the defenses of Washington, D.C., until March 1862. Advance on Manassas, Va., March 10–15. Moved to Newport News, Va., March 28. Siege of Yorktown April 5-May 4. Battle of Williamsburg May 5. Operations about Bottom's Bridge May 20–23. Battle of Seven Pines May 31-June 1. Seven days before Richmond June 25-July 1. Battle of Gaines's Mill June 27. Bottom's Bridge June 28–29. White Oak Swamp June 30. Malvern Hill July 1. At Harrison's Landing until August 16. Moved to Fort Monroe, Va., August 16–22, then to Yorktown, Va. Duty there and at Gloucester Point until December 26. Action at Lee's Mills September 16. Reconnaissance to Gloucester and Matthews Counties December 11–15. Moved to Morehead City, N.C., December 26-January 1, 1863; then to Port Royal, S.C., January 28–31. At St. Helena Island, S.C., until March 27, and at Seabrook Island until July 6. Expedition to James Island July 9–16. Grimball's Landing, Secessionville, July 16. Siege of Fort Wagner, Morris Island, S.C., and operations against Fort Sumter and Charleston until August. Duty in District of Beaufort, S.C., until September 1864. Expedition to James Island, S.C., June 30-July 10, 1864. James Island July 4. John's Island July 9. Duty on Morris and Folly Islands, S.C., until November. Hatch's Expedition up Broad River November 28–30. Battle of Honey Hill November 30. Demonstration on Charleston and Savannah Railroad December 6–9. Deveaux's Neck December 6. Coosawhatchie December 9. Ordered to Morris Island January 18, 1865, and duty there until March 25. Potter's Expedition to Camden, S.C., April 5–25. Dingle's Mills April 9. Statesburg April 15. Occupation of Camden April 17. Boykin's Mills April 18. Denkin's Mills and Beech Creek, near Statesburg, April 19. Duty in Northern and Western Districts of South Carolina until September.

== Casualties ==
The regiment lost a total of 280 men during service; 1 officer and 63 enlisted men killed or mortally wounded, 3 officers and 213 enlisted men died of disease.

== Commanders ==
- Colonel Charles Henry Van Wyck
- Colonel Rockwell Tyler

== See also ==
- List of New York Civil War regiments
- List of American Civil War legions
- New York in the Civil War
