= James Porter (Presbyterian minister) =

Irish Presbyterian minister and satirist

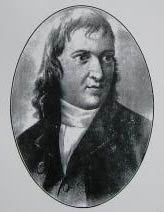
- Born: 1753; Ballindrait, Ireland
- Died: 2 July 1798 (aged 44–45)
- Occupations: Presbyterian minister and satirist

James Porter (1753 – 2 July 1798) was an Irish Presbyterian minister and satirist. He was executed in 1798. He was the only ordained Presbyterian minister to face capital punishment after the Irish Rebellion of 1798.

== Biography ==
=== Early life ===
He was born into an Ulster-Scots family, being the son of Alexander Porter. He was born in 1753 at Tamna Wood, near the village of Ballindrait in the Laggan district in the east of County Donegal in Ulster, the northern province in Ireland. His father was a farmer and owner of a flax-scutching mill. James was the eldest of eight children. On his father's death (about 1773) he gave up the farm and mill to a younger brother, and engaged himself as a schoolmaster at Dromore in County Down.

In 1780, he married and moved to a school at Drogheda in County Louth.

=== Clerical career ===
Designing to enter the Presbyterian ministry, he went to Glasgow as a divinity student (apparently in 1784); and, having finished a two years' course, was licensed, in 1786 or 1787, by Bangor presbytery in County Down. After being an unsuccessful candidate for the presbyterian congregation of Ballindrait in East Donegal, he received, through the good offices of Robert Black, D.D., a call to Greyabbey, County Down, where he was ordained by Bangor presbytery on 31 July 1787. No subscription was required of him, and the test questions, drawn up by Andrew Craig, were Arian in complexion.

His professional income did not exceed 60l.; hence he supplemented his resources by farming. Having mechanical tastes, he fitted up a workshop, and constructed models of improved farming implements. He also set up a school in Greyabbey. By this and other means he did much to promote the physical well-being of his flock, to whom he was an assiduous pastor. He is said to have been an Arian, but there seems no evidence of his attachment to a special school of theology. He was a follower of the ‘New Light’ movement.

=== United Irishmen ===
Porter had joined the volunteer movement which began in 1778, but took no prominent part in connection with it. He was not a United Irishman. He was not publicly known as a politician until after the suppression of the volunteer movement by the Convention Act 1793 (33 Geo. 3. c. 29 (I)). One effect of this arbitrary measure was to throw into alliance with the secret society of United Irishmen those who, like Porter, were in favour of parliamentary reform and Catholic emancipation, but were now debarred from the holding of open meetings for the agitation of constitutional reforms.

=== Writings ===
Porter was the author of Billy Bluff, a series of anonymous articles published in support of working class tenants against their landlords.

The United Irishmen had set up a newspaper in 1792 with Samuel Neilson. Two years later, Porter became a contributor to this paper, the Northern Star These included a number of anonymous patriotic songs, which were afterwards reprinted in Paddy's Resource. In 1796, he contributed a famous series of seven letters by 'A Presbyterian'. The first, dated 21 May, was published in the number for 27–30 May. They were at once reprinted, with the title Billy Bluff and Squire Firebrand, Belfast, 1796. The characters are broadly drawn, with a humour which is effective without being malicious; the system of feudal tyranny and local espionage is drawn from the life. The original of Billy Bluff was William Lowry, bailiff on the Greyabbey estate; 'Lord Mountmumble' was Robert Stewart, then Baron Stewart of Mountstewart, afterwards 1st Marquess of Londonderry; 'Squire Firebrand' was Hugh Montgomery of Rosemount House, proprietor of the Greyabbey estate.

Later in 1796, Porter, whose name had become a household word in Ulster, went through the province on a lecturing tour. His subject was natural philosophy; he showed experiments with an electric battery and model balloons. He had previously given similar lectures in his own neighbourhood, but the authorities suspected that his lectures were the pretext for a political mission. He had written for the Northern Star with the signature A Man of Ulster, and he began another series of letters on 23 December 1796, addressed, with the signature of 'Sydney', to the 2nd Marquess of Downshire. In these he vehemently attacked the policy of William Pitt the Younger, and the publication of the paper was for some time suspended by the authorities. Meanwhile, on Thursday, 16 February, the government fast-day of thanksgiving for "the late providential storm which dispersed the French fleet off Bantry Bay," Porter preached at Greyabbey a sermon, which was published with the title Wind and Weather, Belfast, 1797. It was a sustained effort of irony, suggested by the text, "Ye walked according to … the prince of the power of the air." Its literary merit is considerable.

=== Arrest and execution ===
On the outbreak of the Irish Rebellion of 1798, Porter was a marked man; a large reward was offered for his apprehension. There is no evidence of any knowledge on his part of the plans of the insurgents; it is certain that he committed no overt act of rebellion, and all his published counsels were for peaceable measures of constitutional redress. He withdrew for safety to the house of Johnson of Ballydoonan, two miles from Greyabbey, and afterwards sought concealment in a cottage among the Mourne Mountains, on the verge of his parish. Here he was arrested in June 1798, and taken to Belfast, but removed to Newtownards for trial by court-martial. The charge against him was that he had been present with a party of insurgents who, between 9 and 11 June, having intercepted the mail between Belfast and Saintfield, County Down, had read a despatch from the commanding officer at Belfast to a subordinate at Portaferry, County Down. The postboy from whom the despatch had been taken could not identify him; but a United Irishman, who had turned informer, swore to his guilt. Porter's cross-examination of this witness was interrupted. He made an appeal to the court, affirming his innocence, and referring to his own character as that of a man "who, in the course of a laborious and active life, never concealed his sentiments." He was sentenced to be hanged and quartered.

His wife was told by the military authorities that Londonderry could suspend the execution. With her seven children, the youngest eight months old, she made her way to Mountstewart. Londonderry's daughters had attended Porter's scientific lectures and one of them, Lady Elizabeth Mary (d. 1798), an invalid, who was expecting her own death, undertook to intercede with her father. Londonderry could not forgive the satire of 'Lord Mountmumble.' Tradition has it that Mrs. Porter waylaid his lordship's carriage, in a vain hope of prevailing by personal entreaty, but Londonderry told the coachman to drive on. The sentence, however, was mitigated by remission of the order for quartering. He was executed on 2 July 1798, on a green knoll, close to the road which led from his meeting-house to his home, and in full view of both. At the gallows he sang the 35th Psalm and prayed; his wife was with him to the last.

=== Legacy ===
He was buried in the abbey churchyard at Greyabbey; a flat tombstone gives his age as 45 years. He is described as one of the handsomest men of his time. Henry Montgomery, LL.D., who as a boy had seen him, spoke of him as "distinguished for an agreeable address." He was a collector of books, and his scientific apparatus was unrivalled in the north of Ireland in his day.

== Family ==
He married, in 1780, Anna Knox of Dromore, who died in Belfast on 3 November 1823. Her right to an annuity from the widows' fund was for some time in doubt; it was paid (with arrears) from 1800. He and Anna had eight children.

Of his five daughters, the eldest, Ellen Anne, married John Cochrane Wightman, presbyterian minister of Holywood, County Down; the second, Matilda, married Andrew Goudy, presbyterian minister of Ballywalter, County Down, and was the mother of Alexander Porter Goudy, D.D.; the fourth, Isabella, married James Templeton, presbyterian minister of Ballywalter; the fifth, Sophia, married William D. Henderson, esq., Belfast.

Porter's eldest son, Alexander, is stated by a questionable local tradition to have carried a stand of colours at the battle of Ballynahinch (12 June 1798), being then fourteen years of age; and the story runs that he fled to Tamna Wood, and was there recognised (but not betrayed) by a soldier of the Armagh militia. He migrated to Louisiana, of which state he became a senator, and he died there on 13 January 1844. Another son, James, became attorney-general of Louisiana.
