= Octave LaBranche =

Former American politician

Speaker of the Louisiana House of Representatives
- In office 1827–1828
- Preceded by: André Bienvenu Roman
- Succeeded by: André Bienvenu Roman

Personal details
- Party: Jacksonian

Octave LaBranche was a politician in Louisiana who served as the seventh speaker of the Louisiana House of Representatives, a position he held from 1827 to 1828. He represented St. Charles Parish in the Louisiana House of Representatives from 1814 to 1828. LaBranche, the son of Alexandre LaBranche, was a veteran of the Battle of New Orleans. He owned slaves.
