= Roffignac cocktail =

New Orleans cocktail

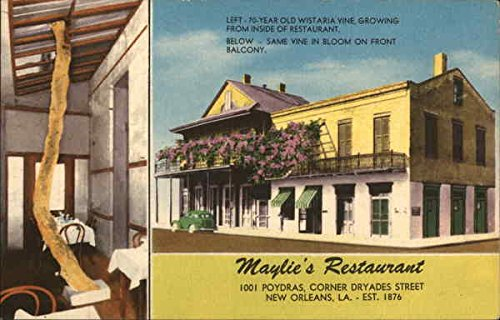
Maylié's New Orleans restaurant, where the Roffignac was the signature cocktail.

The Roffignac cocktail was invented in New Orleans at some date before 1874 and was named after Louis Philippe de Roffignac, who was Mayor of New Orleans from 1820 to 1828, not long after Louisiana became a US state. The cocktail remained popular in New Orleans until the 1960s.

== Characteristics ==
The Roffignac is a refreshing, fruit-forward cocktail traditionally made with raspberry shrub (a fruit-infused vinegar syrup) and either cognac or whiskey. It is known for its well-balanced blend of tartness and sweetness, reflecting the classic flavors of New Orleans cocktail culture.

== History ==
From two early sources it appears that the Roffignac was invented around 1870 and may have been named to suggest rivalry with the Sazerac cocktail. The Sazerac coffee house was already popular and served spirits mixed with bitters, although it is not certain that its signature cocktail had been named at this early date.

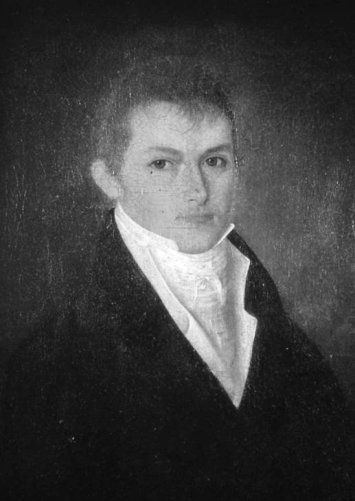
Louis Philippe de Roffignac for whom the Roffignac cocktail was named

The earliest source is an advertisement printed in the New Orleans Bulletin (August 2, 1874), which demonstrates that the "Roufignac" was a speciality of Harrison's coffee shop:

"Eve-Dropping: Come right along with me to Harrison's, corner Magazine and Thalia streets. He makes the syrups himself. You will find his nectar rich, creamy and delicious, his chocolate, coffee, Roufignac and all the fruit syrups are splendid, and I guarantee each one true to its name."

Harrison was soon afterwards prosecuted for selling liquor without a licence, which suggests that his "syrups", and naturally his "Roufignac", were fortified with brandy or whiskey.

The second source is a citation of a bartender, T. P. Thompson, in the Washington Post (January 9, 1911). It includes the false claims that the "Roupegnac" was first mixed by the very mayor of New Orleans after whom it was named, and that the Sazerac was invented by a man named Sazerac, but it shows that the two cocktails were seen as rivals:

"A competitor of Sazerac determined to invent a drink that would rival that of the old Frenchman. He began by mixing brandy with vanilla sirup and sugar, and he gradually worked it into an exceedingly palatable cocktail ... This drink is known as the roupegnac ... The cocktail was named after the man who first mixed it, and he afterwards became the mayor of New Orleans."

After Harrison's time the Roffignac became a popular drink at Mannessier's confectionery in the late 19th century, and was later the signature cocktail of Maylié's creole restaurant, which survived until 1986.
