= Guillaume Louis DeBuys =

American politician (1798–1856)

Guillaume Louis DeBuys (July 19, 1798 – May 24, 1856) was a member of the Louisiana State House of Representatives.

A veteran of the War of 1812, DeBuys was born near New Orleans and served as Speaker of the Louisiana House in 1839-1841 and later participated in the gubernatorial election of 1846, when was defeated by Isaac Johnson.

Party political offices
| Preceded by Henry Johnson | Whig nominee for Governor of Louisiana; 1846 | Succeeded by Alexandre Etienne de Clouet |
Political offices
| Preceded by Joseph Marshall Walker | Speakers of the Louisiana House of Representatives; 1839–1841 | Succeeded by William C. C. Claiborne |
