= John Archer Elmore =

- Born: August 21, 1762; Prince Edward County, Virginia
- Died: April 24, 1834 (aged 71); Autauga, Alabama, U.S.
- Children: 19 (including Franklin, William and Henry)
- Military career
- Allegiance: United States of America
- Rank: Private; General
- Conflicts: American Revolutionary War
- Other work: South Carolina State Legislature; Alabama State Legislature

John Archer Elmore (21 August 1762 – 24 April 1834) was an American military officer and politician. Born in Virginia to a Quaker father, Elmore nonetheless joined the Continental Army during the American Revolution.

== Biography ==
Elmore was born in Prince Edward County, Virginia on 21 August 1762 to Archelaus Elmore and Susannah Morris. He joined the Continental Army while still a youth and served in the Virginia Line under Nathanael Greene. Elmore was with Green in his tour through the Carolinas, and was present at the Surrender of Cornwallis at Yorktown.

After the war, he settled in Laurens District, South Carolina, where he was elected to the State Legislature. Elmore stood for election to the United States House of Representatives in 1810, but was soundly defeated by John C. Calhoun in what was Calhoun's first Congressional run. In 1819, he moved to Autauga, Alabama, where he was again elected as a State Legislator and served there until his death in 1834. Part of Autauga County was renamed Elmore County in his honor.

His interment was at his former home Huntingdon in Elmore County, Alabama.

The General John Archer Elmore Chapter of the Sons of the American Revolution is named in his honor.

== Family ==
Elmore married Mary Ann Sarah Saxon on 1 March 1788 and they had five children. Elmore was later married to Nancy Ann Martin on 14 March 1805 with whom he had another 14 children.

Children with Mary Ann Sarah Saxon

- Benjamin Thomas (1791–1841)
- Narcissa (1792–1795)
- Sophia Saxon (1794–1825)
- Charlotte Perry (1796–1832)
- Franklin Harper (1799–1850) (U.S. Congressman and Senator from South Carolina)

Children with Nancy Ann Martin

- Susan Elizabeth (1805–1889) (married Dixon Hall Lewis)
- Sarah Terry (1807–1839) (married Benjamin Fitzpatrick)
- John Archer (1808–1878) (Alabama state legislature)
- Morris Martin (b. 1810)
- William Augustus (1812–1890) (Attorney General of Louisiana and superintendent of the New Orleans Mint)
- Luther Alfred (b. 1814)
- Henry Marshall (1816–1879) (Colonel in the Confederate States Army)
- Laurence Ludlow (1817–1840)
- Physick Rush (1819–1864) (judge in Kansas Territory)
- Winfield Scott (b. 1820)
- Infant
- Mary Martin (1823–1916)
- James Scott (b. 1825)
- Albert Stanhope (1827–1909) (Secretary of State of Alabama and collector of the port of Mobile)
- Ann Harriet (1829–1907)

== See also ==
- Nathanael Greene
