= List of American Civil War legions =

This is a list of American Civil War legions, legions being defined as combined arms units of infantry and cavalry and, often but not always, artillery. The popularity of this type of unit had declined by the time of the American Civil War owing to the difficulty of organizing and maintaining its disparate elements; nevertheless, the Confederate Congress authorized the raising of at least ten legions. Units called legions for other reasons are also included.

== Confederate legions ==
- Cherokee Legion, a short-lived unit of the Georgia State Guard organized in 1863. It consisted of one battalion of infantry and one battalion of cavalry.
- Cobb's Legion or Georgia Legion, raised in the summer of 1861 by Colonel Thomas Reade Rootes Cobb
- Floyd Legion, a short-lived unit of the Georgia State Guard organized in 1863. It consisted of one battalion of infantry and one battalion of cavalry as well as an artillery battery.
- Hampton's Legion, raised in the summer of 1861 by Wade Hampton III
- Hilliard's Legion, organized in Montgomery, Alabama in June 1862, under the command of Colonel Henry Washington Hilliard. It was composed of five battalions: three infantry, one cavalry, and one artillery. It suffered heavy losses at the Battle of Chickamauga.
- Hindman's Legion, a unit raised and commanded by Thomas C. Hindman. Unapproved and quickly broken up; it consisted of the 2nd Arkansas Infantry Regiment, the 1st Arkansas Infantry Battalion, the 6th Arkansas Cavalry Battalion and Swett's Battery of Mississippi Light Artillery.
- Holcombe Legion, briefly known as Steven's Legion, a South Carolina unit raised in 1861 with an infantry battalion serving in the Army of Northern Virginia and a split cavalry battalion mostly serving at Richmond.
- Louisiana Legion. Established in 1821, it was "the oldest brigade in the city [New Orleans]. By the beginning of 1861 this consisted of the Orleans Battalion of Artillery, containing French and Spanish citizens; the Regiment of Light Infantry, composed of Germans; and the newly formed battalion of Chasseurs à Pied de la Louisiane."
- Miles' Legion, organized May 16 or 17, 1862 at Camp Moore, Louisiana, with an infantry and a cavalry battalion under the command of Colonel William R. Miles
- Phillips' Legion, organized circa June 1861 in Georgia, with one infantry and one cavalry battalion. The battalions were assigned to different units in 1862 and thereafter served apart.
- Smith's Legion, a Georgia unit existing in 1862 and 1863. The infantry battalion later joined the 65th Georgia Infantry and the cavalry battalion became part of the 6th Georgia Cavalry.
- Thomas' Legion, also known as Thomas' Legion of Cherokee Indians and Highlanders and the 69th North Carolina. It was raised on September 27, 1862, by William Holland Thomas and incorporated a large number of Cherokee Indians. It fought in the last skirmish in North Carolina before surrendering on May 9, 1865.
- Waul's Legion, raised in spring 1862 by Brigadier General Thomas Neville Waul in Texas
- Wise Legion, a brigade-sized command organized by Brig. Gen. Henry A. Wise in 1861. Initially three regiments, later designated as 46th Virginia Infantry, 59th Virginia Infantry and 60th Virginia Infantry, formed the infantry component to which others were added. The cavalry regiment became the 10th Virginia Cavalry while the legion also had at least one battery (Hale's) of artillery.
- Wright's Legion, commanded by Col. Augustus R. Wright. Becoming the 38th Georgia Infantry; it consisted of eleven infantry companies, one of cavalry and one of artillery. Later the cavalry company was converted into infantry and the artillery battery was transferred.

== Union legions ==
- 10th Legion, or 56th New York Infantry. Organized in October 1861 with eleven infantry companies, it acquired two light artillery batteries and two troops of cavalry.
- Purnell Legion. Organized October to December 1861 from Baltimore and the Eastern Shore of Maryland, it consisted originally of nine infantry companies, two cavalry companies, and two light artillery batteries. It was broken up in early 1862, and elements served independently through the remainder of the war.

== Legions in name only ==
=== Confederate ===
- 1st and 2nd Foreign Legion, applied to Tucker's Confederate Regiment and the 8th Confederate Infantry Battalion. Both units were recruited from prisoners of war.
- Jeff. Davis Legion, a cavalry regiment
- Kemper Legion, a company of the 13th Mississippi Infantry Regiment.
- Pee Dee Legion, the 9th South Carolina Infantry Battalion
- Rucker's Legion, also known as 1st East Tennessee Legion. This formation, commanded by Col. Edmund Rucker, consisted of the 12th and 16th Tennessee Cavalry Battalions.
- Walker Legion, the 2nd (Robison's) Tennessee Infantry. Organized on May 6, 1861; this was a different unit than the 2nd (Walker's) Tennessee Infantry which was organized five days later.
- Whitfield's Legion or First Texas Legion, raised in the summer of 1861, later renamed the 27th Texas Cavalry. As the last title implies, it was solely a cavalry unit.

=== Union ===
- Chicago Legion, the 51st Illinois Infantry
- Corcoran Legion or Irish Legion, composed of the 155th New York Infantry, 164th New York Infantry, 170th New York Infantry, 175th New York Infantry, and 182nd New York Infantry, commanded by Brigadier General Michael Corcoran
- German Legion, the Independent Battalion of New York Volunteer Infantry. Mustered with six companies in 1862; later another four were added. The battalion was broken up in 1864.
- Indiana Legion, a name given to the Indiana militia
- Irish Legion, the 90th Illinois Infantry
- Italian/Netherland/Polish Legion, all referring to the 39th New York Infantry
- Louisville Legion, the 5th Kentucky Infantry
- Lyon Legion, the 24th Missouri Infantry
- Mountain Legion, the 156th New York Infantry
- New York Excelsior Rifle Legion, the 92nd New York Infantry
- Pennsylvania Legion, original name of the 73rd Pennsylvania Infantry
- Polish Legion, the 58th New York Infantry, under Colonel Włodzimierz Krzyżanowski. It was listed in the official Army Register as the Polish Legion.
- Scott Legion, the 20th Pennsylvania Infantry. A number of veterans of the Mexican–American War formed the "Scott Legion" afterward, named in honor of Winfield Scott. When the regiment was raised around April 1861, 31 of its 37 officers were members of the organization, so the unit acquired the (unofficial) name.
- Stanton Legion, the 145th New York Infantry
