= Louisiana Legion =

The Louisiana Legion was a militia unit based in New Orleans, Louisiana. Formed in 1821, it was "the oldest brigade in the city." It was a combined arms force, with infantry, cavalry and artillery components. The Louisiana Legion was disbanded, along with all other volunteer Louisiana companies, in February 1862 to free soldiers to join other American Civil War units.

The Louisiana Legion was organized in 1821 with four companies, including the Washington Artillery. The Cabildo, which served as the first armory of the Washington Artillery, still bears the initials of the Louisiana Legion ("L. L.") in the iron latticework of its balcony. The following year, Count Louis Philippe de Roffignac became its colonel.

By 1853, the unit "consisted almost exclusively of foreigners". In 1855, when its commander, Brigadier General H. W. Palfrey, was absent, his duties were regularly carried out by German Colonel Fred Otto Eichholz, a veteran of the Mexican War.

"By the beginning of 1861 this [the Louisiana Legion] consisted of the Orleans Battalion of Artillery, containing French and Spanish citizens; the Regiment of Light Infantry, composed of Germans; and the newly formed battalion of Chasseurs à Pied de la Louisiane." Other Legion subunits in 1861 included: "the Battalion of Italian Guards, the Légion Française, the Beauregard Battalion, the Battalion of Cazadores, the French Volunteers, and the Battalion of Orleans Guards." That same year, the entire staff resigned, including Eichholz. Brigadier General Charles Labuzan assumed command some time after. In September, the unit, 2223 strong (if not well-armed), paraded through the city to reassure the residents they were well protected. In December, all naturalized citizens were ordered to leave the unit so they could join companies made up of citizens. The remaining foreigners were only subject to the militia law of Louisiana, not the laws of the Confederacy. In February 1862, the Louisiana Legion and all other volunteer companies in Louisiana were dissolved by law.

== See also ==
- List of Louisiana Confederate Civil War units
- List of American Civil War legions
