= Louis Philippe de Roffignac =

American politician (1773–1846)

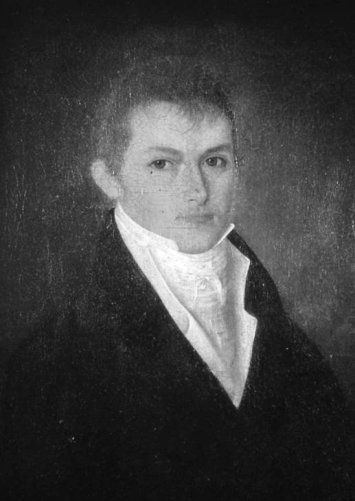
- Roffignac c. 1803

10th Mayor of New Orleans
- In office May 14, 1820 – May 18, 1828
- Preceded by: Auguste Macarty
- Succeeded by: Denis Prieur

Member of Louisiana State Legislature
- In office 1812–1824

Personal details
- Born: Louis Philippe Joseph de Roffignac; September 13, 1773 Angoulême, Kingdom of France
- Died: August 29, 1846 (aged 72) Coulounieix, French Republic
- Cause of death: Gunshot
- Party: Democratic-Republican
- Spouse(s): Félicité Solidelle Montégut (m. 1806)
- Children: Three
- Profession: Merchant, banker

Military service
- Allegiance: Kingdom of France; French Republic
- Branch/service: French Army
- Years of service: 1790-1800
- Rank: Captain
- Battles/wars: French Revolutionary Wars

Count Louis Philippe de Roffignac (also known as Joseph Roffignac) (September 13, 1773 – August 29, 1846) was a wealthy Louisiana merchant, banker, member of the state legislature, and the tenth individual to serve as Mayor of New Orleans, in 1820-1828.

== Early life ==
He was born in Angoulême. At the age of fourteen he was a page in the household of his godmother, Louise Marie Adélaïde de Bourbon, Duchess of Orléans; at seventeen, he joined the French army as a lieutenant of artillery. He first saw service in Spain, under his father. At twenty-four he was promoted captain for gallant and meritorious service in the field. His army career then took him to America, and in 1800 he settled in Louisiana.

== Political career ==
He served ten consecutive terms in the state legislature. For his participation in the Battle of New Orleans, he was made an honorary brigadier general. When the Louisiana Legion was formed, in 1822, he became its colonel. Among his many business endeavors, he was for a time a director of the State Bank of Louisiana. For many years he was a member of the City Council, and was a member of that body when elected mayor.

As mayor of New Orleans, Roffignac sought to develop the city as fast as possible, borrowing large sums of money by issuing "city stock", a form of municipal bonds. He used the money to improve and beautify the city: he was responsible for the massive planting of trees as well the first street paving. In 1821 he introduced street lighting. In the late 1820s he organized the city's first regular fire department. He established New Orleans' first public educational system. He also strove to regulate gambling, but was only the first of several mayors to deal with this long intractable problem.

== Retirement ==
He resigned in 1828 and returned to France, to a leisurely retirement in literary and social pursuits. He died at his château, near Périgueux, under curious circumstances: according to the medical examiner called in to determine the precise cause of his death, he had been sitting in his invalid chair, examining a loaded pistol, when he was suddenly overwhelmed by an apoplectic stroke and fell to the floor; in the fall, the pistol fired into his brain.

Roffignac Street in New Orleans is named for him. His name is also commemorated in the Roffignac cocktail, invented about 40 years after his term as mayor, popular locally until the 1960s.

== Sources ==
- Stanley Arthur, Old New Orleans, a History of the Vieux Carre, Its Ancient and Historical Buildings, Heritage Books, 2009, p. 123
- Henry C. Castellanos, New Orleans as it was: Episodes of Louisiana Life, LSU Press, 2006, p. 14-27
- Grace Elizabeth King, Creole Families of New Orleans, The Macmillan Company, 1921, p. 435-442
- James F. Hopkins, The Papers of Henry Clay: Secretary of State 1827, University Press of Kentucky, 1981, p. 636
- Denise Gee, Southern Cocktails: Dixie Drinks, Party Potions, and Classic Libations, Chronicle Books, 2013, p. 49

Preceded by Auguste Macarty	Mayor of New Orleans; 1820–1828	Succeeded by Denis Prieur
