= Robert S. Lovett =

American lawyer and railroad executive

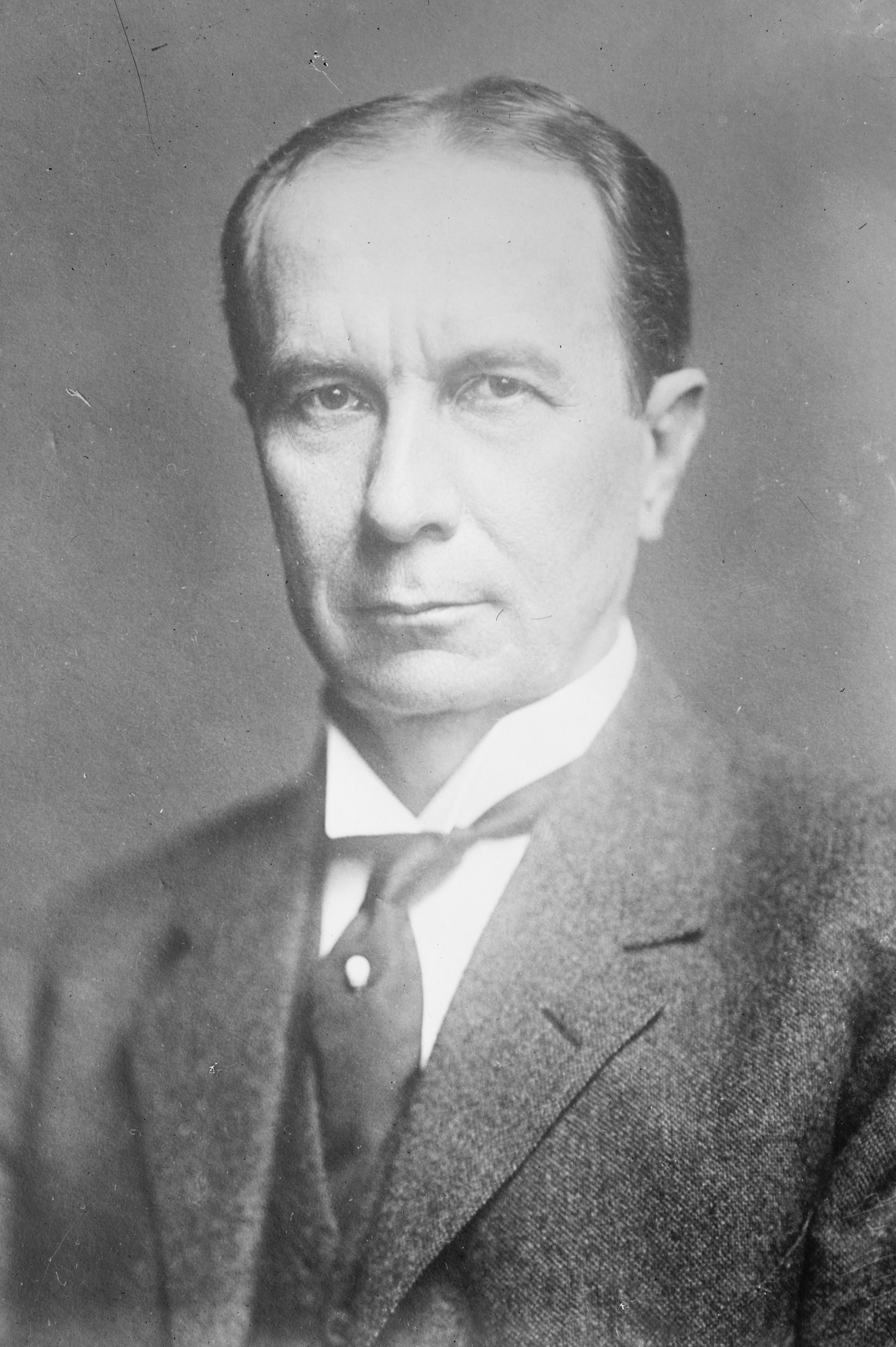
- Born: Robert Scott Lovett; June 22, 1860; San Jacinto, Texas, U.S.
- Died: June 19, 1932 (aged 71); Manhattan, New York City, U.S.
- Resting place: Locust Valley Cemetery, Locust Valley, New York, U.S.
- Spouse: Lavinia Chilton Abercrombie (m. 1890; died 1928)
- Children: Robert A. Lovett
- Relatives: Leonard A. Abercrombie (father-in-law)

Robert Scott Lovett (June 22, 1860 – June 19, 1932) was an American lawyer and railroad executive. He was president and chairman of the board of the Union Pacific Railroad and a Director of both The National City Bank of New York and Western Union.

== Biography ==
=== Early life ===
Robert Scott Lovett was born in San Jacinto, Texas. He was the son of William Lovett and Susan Hardy Lovett. His mother died in 1861 when Robert was only one year old; he was raised by Sarah Elizabeth "Sally" Hood Lovett, his father's second wife. He attended Houston High School. Lovett studied law privately and was admitted to the bar in 1882.

=== Career ===
Lovett served as counsel for the Houston East & West Texas Railroad from 1884 to 1889. He then served as council for Texas and Pacific Railway from 1891 to 1903.

From 1904 to 1909 Robert S. Lovett was general counsel, and after 1909 president, of the E. H. Harriman system of railroads—the Union Pacific and Southern Pacific. In the wake of the Northern Securities Case he was compelled to dissolve the Southern Pacific and Union Pacific merger in 1913. In 1914 he accepted directorships in the New York Central and Nickel Plate railroads. Consequently, the Lovett family settled into a "Gold Coast" mansion at Locust Valley, New York. During World War I, he served as commissioner of the priorities committee of the War Industries Board. He resigned the role in 1918 and was succeeded by Edwin B. Parker. He then joined the Railroad Administration as director of capital expenditures. He became president of the Union Pacific in 1919 and served in that role until his appointment as chairman of the board of directors on March 1, 1920.

== Personal life ==
On October 29, 1890, Lovett married Lavinia Chilton Abercrombie, daughter of lawyer and Texas state senator Leonard A. Abercrombie, granddaughter of Justice William Parish Chilton. His wife died in 1928. Their only child was noted politician Robert A. Lovett. He lived in Candelight.

Lovett died on July 19, 1932, at the Medical Center in Manhattan.

== Legacy ==
In World War II, the United States Liberty ship SS Robert S. Lovett was named in his honor.

== See also ==
- List of railroad executives

Preceded by vacant	Chairman of the Southern Pacific Company Executive Committee; 1909 – 1913	Succeeded by Julius Kruttschnitt
Preceded by E. H. Harriman	President of Union Pacific Railroad; 1910 – 1911	Succeeded by A. L. Mohler
