= Augustin de Macarty =

American politician

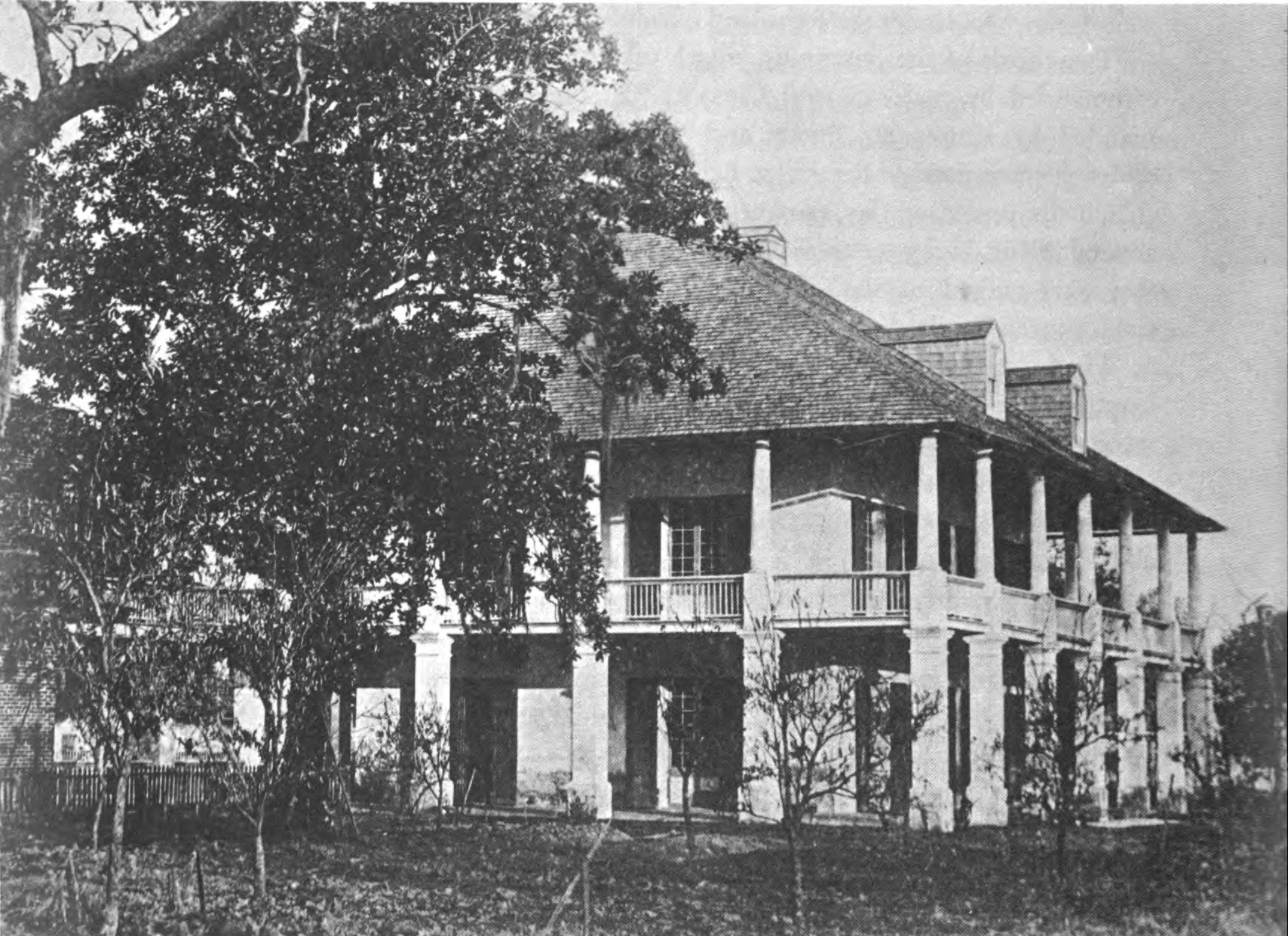
- Old photograph of now-destroyed plantation home of Augustin Francois Macarty, used by Andrew Jackson as his field headquarters at the Battle of New Orleans (collection of Stanley Clisby Arthur)

Mayor of New Orleans
- In office September 4, 1815 – May 13, 1820
- Preceded by: Nicholas Girod
- Succeeded by: Louis Philippe de Roffignac

Personal details
- Born: January 10, 1774 New Orleans, Louisiana
- Died: October 16, 1844 (aged 70) New Orleans, Louisiana
- Party: Democratic-Republican
- Parent(s): Augustin Guillaume de Macarty, Jeanne Chauvin de Lery

Augustin Francois de Macarty or McCarthy (January 10, 1774 – October 16, 1844) was an American planter who served as the sixth mayor of New Orleans from September 4, 1815, to May 13, 1820. He was a member of an influential Creole family that was allied by marriage to Esteban Rodríguez Miró, one of the last Spanish Governors of Louisiana. He was brought to the mayoralty following the resignation of the previous mayor, Nicolas Girod, but subsequently served two full terms, to which he was elected by landslide majorities; after which he declined further terms.

His tenure was chiefly marked by the first officially recorded outbreak of yellow fever, and the subsequent creation of the city's first Board of Health in 1817. It initiated systematic garbage removal and the institution of a port quarantine. In 1816, a comprehensive ordinance regulated theaters. In 1817, house numbering was instituted. In 1818, the city limits were expanded to include what is now the Eighth Ward. In 1819, the city's first public waterworks system was begun; its execution was entrusted to Benjamin Henry Latrobe, who succumbed to yellow fever there himself, the following year.

During Macarty's tenure, which commenced following the conclusion of the War of 1812, the population of New Orleans grew from 33,000 to 41,000; and commerce, measured by Mississippi boat traffic and receipts, doubled. The expansion of New Orleans into the "American Quarter" took place under Macarty's tenure and that of the next mayor, Roffignac.

Macarty was a cousin of Delphine LaLaurie, née Macarty, alleged to be a killer of enslaved people and a serial killer.

Political offices
Preceded by Nicolas Girod	Mayor of New Orleans; 1815–1820	Succeeded by Louis Philippe de Roffignac
