= William Augustus Elmore =

American judge

William Augustus Elmore (October 13, 1812 – October 6, 1890) was a 19th-century American lawyer and judge in New Orleans, Louisiana.

Born in Laurens District, South Carolina, to John Archer Elmore and Nancy Ann Martin; among his siblings was his half brother Franklin H. Elmore, who served in both U.S. House of Representatives and the U.S. Senate representing South Carolina.

Elmore began a practicing law in New Orleans in 1835, forming a partnership with William W. King. He served as Attorney General of Louisiana during the governorship of Isaac Johnson from 1846 to 1850. President James Buchanan appointed him superintendent of the New Orleans Mint and was retained in that position when the mint came under the control of the Confederate government in 1861. He was later judge of the Eighth District Court by the appointment of Governor Francis T. Nicholls.

Elmore married twice, first to Mary Ann Morrison on July 28, 1840. Following her death, he married Julia Minor on January 2, 1851, in Ascension Parish. He had children by both wives.

Elmore died of apoplexy at Crowell House in Greencastle, Pennsylvania on October 6, 1890, just a week short of his 78th birthday. He was interred at "Huntingdon" in Elmore County, Alabama.

== Sources ==
- The New York Herald, Obituary of William Augustus Elmore, October 7, 1890.
- The Daily Picayune, Obituary of William Augustus Elmore, October 7, 1890.

Legal offices
Preceded by Isaac Trimble Preston	Attorney General of Louisiana; 1846–1850	Succeeded by Isaac Johnson
