= André B. Roman =

American politician (1795–1866)

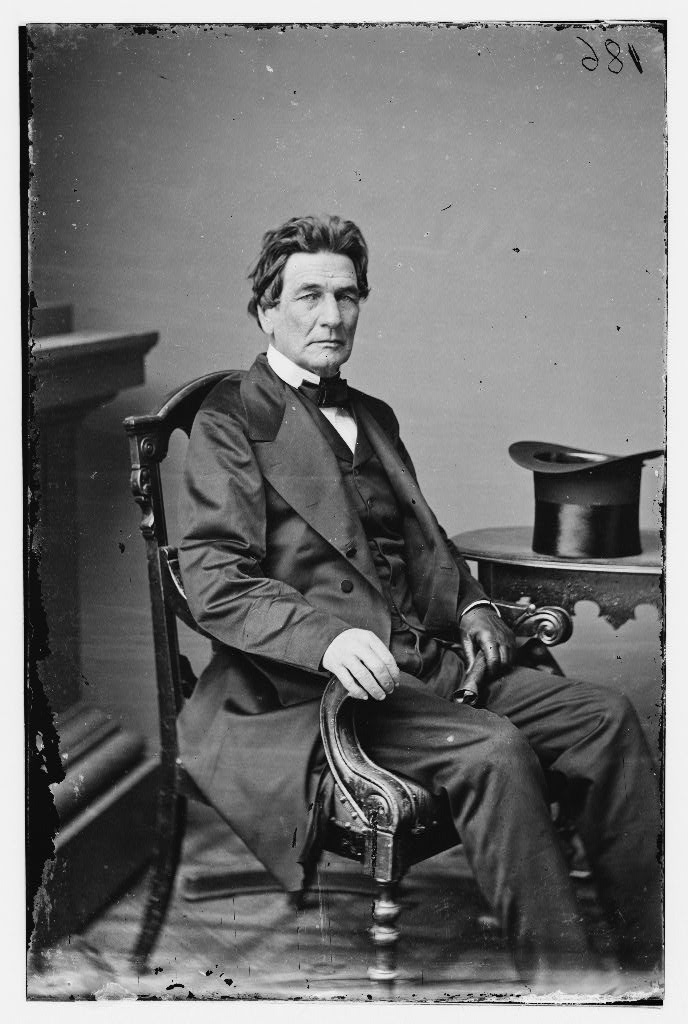

9th Governor of Louisiana
- In office February 4, 1839 – January 30, 1843
- Preceded by: Edward D. White
- Succeeded by: Alexandre Mouton
- In office January 31, 1831 – February 4, 1835
- Preceded by: Jacques Dupré
- Succeeded by: Edward D. White

Speaker of the Louisiana House of Representatives
- In office 1828–1830
- Preceded by: Octave LaBranche
- Succeeded by: Alexandre Mouton
- In office 1822–1826
- Preceded by: Arnaud Beauvais
- Succeeded by: Octave LaBranche

Member of the Louisiana House of Representatives
- In office 1828–1830
- In office 1818–1826

Personal details
- Born: March 5, 1795 Opelousas, Louisiana
- Died: January 26, 1866 (aged 70) New Orleans, Louisiana, U.S.
- Party: Whig
- Spouse: Aimée Françoise Parent
- Children: 8
- Education: St. Mary's Seminary and University

André Bienvenue Roman (March 5, 1795 – January 26, 1866) was an American planter and politician who served as Speaker of the Louisiana House of Representatives and the Governor of Louisiana. A member of the Whig Party, he served as a state representative, Speaker of the House twice, a Parish judge, and as governor from 1831 until 1835 and again from 1839 to 1843. He also served as a delegate to the states constitutional conventions of 1845 and 1852 and was chosen as a representative to the Louisiana Secession Convention in 1861.

== Early life ==
André Bienvenue Roman was born on March 5, 1795 in Opelousas, Louisiana, the son of Jacques Étienne Roman and Marie-Louise Patin. Roman's family moved to a sugar cane plantation in St. James Parish soon after his birth. In 1815, Roman graduated from St. Mary's University in Baltimore and soon after bought his own sugar plantation, Cabahanoce, located in St. James Parish. The following year he married Aimée Françoise Parent with whom he had eight children.

== Career ==
In 1818, Roman was elected to the Louisiana House of Representatives at the age of 23 and was elected Speaker of the House in 1822, serving until 1826. He was elected as a Judge in St. James Parish before being elected to the State House in 1828. He was again elected as Speaker during the constitutional crisis following the death of Governor Pierre Derbigny in 1828. In the aftermath of Derbigny's unexpected death in office, then State Senate President Arnaud Beauvais was made acting Governor. Beauvais resigned several months later at which point the new Senate President, Jacques Dupré, was made acting governor. The state legislature then called for a special gubernatorial election set for July 1830.

The 1830 election was marked by tensions between the Creole and Anglo-American population of Louisiana. The Creole support was split between Democratic candidate Bernard de Marigny, former governor Jacques Villeré, and Whig candidates Arnaud Beauvais and André B. Roman while Anglo-American candidate W. S. Hamilton ran as a Democrat. Roman won in large part due to support from Kentucky statesman and Whig leader Henry Clay who was in New Orleans at the time planning his run for President in 1832.

Results of the 1830 special gubernatorial election: André Roman 3,638; W. S. Hamilton 2,701; Armand Beauvais 1,478; David Randall 463

On January 31, 1831, Governor Roman took his oath of office during a time of storms, floods, economic depression, and epidemics. During these years of vigorous economic growth, yellow fever killed over 5,000 Louisianans, the number of banks in the state rose from 5 to 11, the Canal Bank built the New Basin Canal and the Pontchartrain Railroad began locomotive service in 1832.

Governor Roman is credited with establishing the state penitentiary system. The College of Jefferson opened in St. James Parish, and the College of Franklin opened in St. Landry Parish. The Louisiana Agricultural Society was organized with Governor Roman as its first president.

The South Carolina nullification controversy moved Roman and most of Louisiana to back President Andrew Jackson's stand on national authority over state nullification. The old Charity Hospital building on Canal Street was used as the State House, while 611 Royal Street was the official residence of the governor after the state government returned from Donaldsonville.

When his term was ending, Governor Roman sought re-election, but he was defeated by Edward Douglass White Sr., another Whig. In 1836, Roman opted to run for the United States Senate, but he was defeated by Alexandre Mouton.

In 1838, Roman again sought election as governor. His opponent this time was Denis Prieur, the Jacksonian Mayor of New Orleans who lived openly with his quadroon mistress. Roman beat Prieur 7,590 votes to 6,782.

On February 4, 1839, Roman resumed the governor's office stressing education and civic improvements. During this administration the first practical impetus on a public education system was established: 600 volumes of Charles Gayarré's Historical Essay on Louisiana were purchased and distributed among the Parish schools. Appropriations allowed copying of parish archives on Louisiana colonial history. Roman created the Office of State Engineer and advocated opening the passes at the mouth of the Mississippi River for better shipping.

Governor Roman served as the President of the New Orleans Drainage Company which drained the swamps behind the city. The Clinton and Port Hudson Railroad, which aided the cotton industry, was established, as well as an experimental farm in St. James Parish. During Governor Roman's second term, the state abolished imprisonment for debt.

With economic crises and panics looming, Roman struggled to maintain calm. He vetoed several new bank charters during the most volatile economic period in antebellum Louisiana (1841–42). The Bank Act of 1842 replaced the earlier easy credit system with a sounder, more restrictive policy.

== Later life ==
After his second term in office, Governor Roman returned to his St. James Parish home but remained politically active. In 1845, he was elected Delegate to the state constitutional convention and in 1848, Roman went to Europe as an agent for Citizens Bank and Consolidated Association of Planters for an extensions of bonds. He was again elected Delegate to the state constitutional convention of 1852.

In January 1861, Roman was elected as a delegate to the Louisiana Secession Convention in Baton Rouge as a representative of St. James and St. John the Baptist Parishes. He was one of the only seventeen members to vote against secession. The Convention voted 113-17 in favor of secession and Governor Roman was selected along with John Forsyth and Martin J. Crawford to negotiate a peaceable separation from the United States, but United States Secretary of State William H. Seward refused to meet with them.

During the war Roman lost all his wealth and property. On January 26, 1866, Roman died while walking down Dumaine Street. He had just accepted an appointment to the office of City Recorder of Deeds and Mortgages from Governor James Madison Wells.

== Sources ==
- State of Louisiana - Biography
- Encyclopedia Louisiana

Party political offices
Preceded by Edward Douglass White Sr.	Whig nominee for Governor of Louisiana; 1838	Succeeded by Henry Johnson
Political offices
Preceded by Armand Beauvais	Speaker of the Louisiana House of Representatives; André B. Roman; 1823–1826	Succeeded by Octave Labranche
Preceded by Octave Labranche	Speaker of the Louisiana House of Representatives; André B. Roman; 1828–1830	Succeeded by Alexandre Mouton
Preceded by Jacques Dupre	Governor of Louisiana; 1831–1835	Succeeded by Edward D. White
Preceded by Edward D. White	Governor of Louisiana; 1839–1843	Succeeded by Alexandre Mouton
