= Denis Prieur (mayor) =

American politician

Mayor of New Orleans
- In office April 4, 1842 – February 7, 1843
- Preceded by: William Freret
- Succeeded by: Paul Bertus
- In office May 12, 1828 – April 9, 1838
- Preceded by: Louis Philippe de Roffignac
- Succeeded by: Paul Bertus

Personal details
- Born: c. 1791; New Orleans, New Spain
- Died: November 9, 1857 (aged 65–66)
- Political party: Democratic

Denis Prieur (c. 1791 – November 9, 1857) served twice as mayor of New Orleans, Louisiana. He served first as a Jacksonian from May 12, 1828, to April 9, 1838, after which he resigned to become of the mortgage registrar. He ran for governor in 1838, but was defeated by former Governor Andre B. Roman. He was again elected mayor, this time running as a Democrat, and served a second time from April 4, 1842, to February 7, 1843. In 1843, Prieur participated in a duel with political adversary and U.S. Senator George A. Waggaman, in which he fatally wounded the senator.

== Sources ==
New Orleans Public Library

Political offices
Preceded by Louis Philippe de Roffignac	Mayor of New Orleans; 1828–1838	Succeeded by Paul Bertus
Preceded by William Freret	Mayor of New Orleans; 1842–1843	Succeeded by Paul Bertus
Party political offices
Preceded by John Bennett Dawson	Democratic nominee for Governor of Louisiana; 1838	Succeeded by Alexandre Mouton
