= Arnaud Beauvais =

American politician (1783–1843)

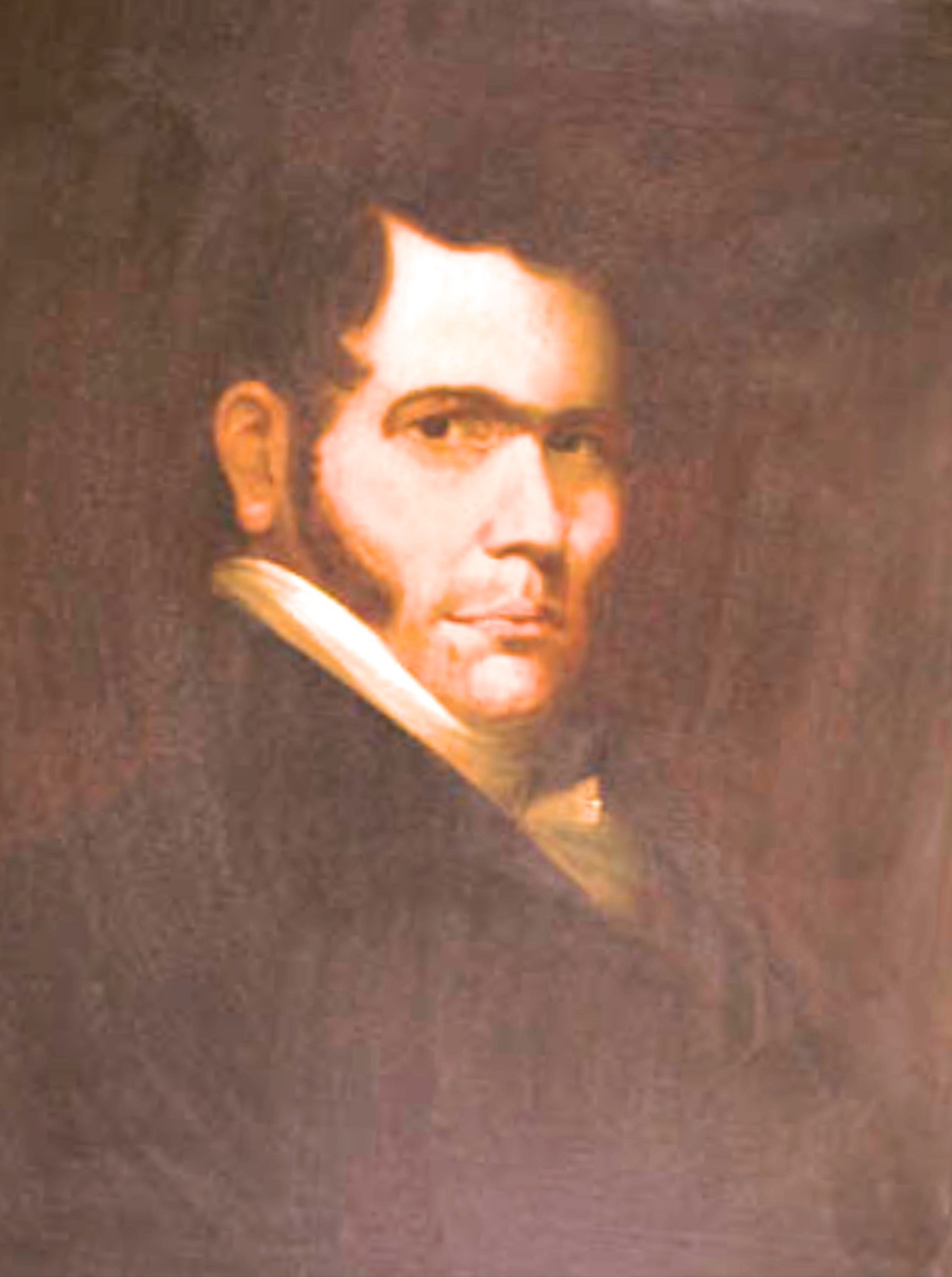

7th Governor of Louisiana
- In office 6 October 1829 – 14 January 1830
- Preceded by: Pierre Derbigny
- Succeeded by: Jacques Dupre

President of the Louisiana Senate
- In office 1827–1830
- Preceded by: Henry S. Thibodaux
- Succeeded by: Jacques Dupré

Member of the Louisiana Senate
- In office 1823–1830

Speaker of the Louisiana House of Representatives
- In office 1820–1822
- Preceded by: David C. Ker
- Succeeded by: André B. Roman

Member of the Louisiana House of Representatives
- In office 1814–1822

Personal details
- Born: September 6, 1783 Pointe Coupee Parish, Louisiana, New Spain
- Died: November 18, 1843 (aged 60) New Orleans, Louisiana
- Party: Whig, Democratic Republican
- Spouse: Louise Delphine Labatut

Arnaud Julie Beauvais (September 6, 1783 – November 18, 1843), also known as Armand Beauvais, or Arnaud Jules Beauvais, was the seventh Governor of Louisiana, as well as member and Speaker of the Louisiana House of Representatives, and member and President of the Louisiana State Senate. His governorship oversaw little change, aside from the transition of the capital of Louisiana being moved from New Orleans to Donaldsonville. He worked as a merchant and plantation owner, as well.

== Biography ==
=== Early life ===
Arnaud Beauvais was born on September 6, 1783, in Pointe Coupee Parish to slaveholding, wealthy, parents Pierre Charles St. James Beauvais and Marie Françoise Richer. He was the youngest of eight siblings and received limited education in the form of private tutoring. By 1806, he purchased a plantation from his widowed mother and a slave. His plantation included eleven arpents (2,112 feet) of frontage land on the Mississippi River. In 1810, he married Louise Delphine Labatut.

A French Louisianian, he was Catholic.

=== Career ===
His first political role came about when William C. C. Claiborne named him the Justice of the peace of Pointe Coupee Parish in 1810. Shortly thereafter, he became an administrators of the Point Coupee school district. His career continued, and he, a supporter of John Quincy Adams, soon thereafter was elected into the Louisiana House of Representatives, serving in 1814, 1816, and 1818. He then took a short break, before returning in 1821 to serve as the Speaker of the Louisiana House of Representatives from 1821 to 1823. During his tenure as Speaker of the House, he also ran for State Senate office as a Whig, being elected in 1822. He would soon thereafter serve as President of the Louisiana State Senate from 1827 to 1830, but was soon thereafter required to serve as the Governor.

After his governorship, he served on the House from 1833 to 1834 after the resignation of a Representative Chenevert.

==== Governor ====
As President of the Senate, Arnaud was next in line to governorship. This came when Governor Pierre Derbigny was thrown from a carriage after ten months in office, dying from injuries sustained.

Under Beauvais, the Louisiana capital was moved from New Orleans to Donaldsonville. His three-month period as acting Governor ended when his bid for reelection as Governor during the special election of 1830 failed. He only ended up receiving 18% of the vote. This campaign was financed using a loan, which he eventually had to pay off, leading to financial woes and the selling of his estate in 1839.

=== Death ===
Arnaud Beauvais died in his New Orleans home on 18 November 1843. He is buried in Saint Louis Cemetery No. 2.

Political offices
Preceded by David C. Ker	Speaker of the Louisiana House of Representatives; Armand Beauvais; 1820–1822	Succeeded by Andre B. Roman
Preceded by Pierre Derbigny	Governor of Louisiana; 1829–1830	Succeeded by Jacques Dupre
