= Henry M. Elmore =

Confederate officer

Henry Marshall Elmore was a Colonel for the Confederate States Army who he commanded the 20th Texas Infantry during the American Civil War. His infantry regiment, although composed predominantly of middle-aged men and whom did not see much action outside of Texas, played an important part in the Confederate recapture of Galveston in January 1863.

== Early life ==
Henry M. Elmore was from one of the oldest families in the South, his first American ancestor having arrived in Virginia in 1647. As was common in the new world, Elmore's ancestors moved West and South with each new generation. Henry M. Elmore was born in Laurens County, South Carolina, and moved with his father, General John Archer Elmore (who fought in the American Revolution), to what is now Elmore County, Alabama. Following the advice of his brother who served in the Mexican–American War, Henry Marshall Elmore moved his own family to Texas in 1853. Although this brother Physic Rush Elmore suggested that he not settle until he was West of the Texan Colorado River, Henry M. Elmore stopped in the East Texas county of Walker, and was one of the founding fathers of Waverly, Texas, named for the Waverley novels of Sir Walter Scott.

== American Civil War service ==
Elmore fought for and organized the 20th Texas Infantry Regiment at Galveston, Texas, during the early summer of 1862. Many of the men under his command had previously served in the 9th Texas (Nichols’) Infantry regiment. They were primarily from Waller, Montgomery, Austin, Kaufman, Galveston, and Walker Counties. The majority of the men from Montgomery County who enlisted in the 20th Texas were in Company G, commanded by Dixon H. Lewis of Old Waverly and Company K, commanded by Captain Lemuel G. Clepper of Montgomery. This regiment had a high percentage of middle-aged men. The regiment was assigned to the Trans-Mississippi Department and was charged with defending the Texas coast from the Sabine River to Galveston. Despite the fact that they did not see action outside of Texas, the 20th Infantry played an important part in the Confederate recapture of Galveston in January 1863. In addition to Colonel Henry Marshall Elmore, its commanding officers were Lieutenant Colonel Leonard A. Abercrombie and Major Robert E. Bell.

== Death ==
In Waverly, Elmore was one of the leading citizens, donating land for the location of the Methodist Church, the Boys and Girls academies, and the Waverly Cemetery, where he is buried.
