= Alexander Porter Goudy =

Irish Presbyterian minister

- Born: February 1809; Ballindrait, Ireland
- Died: 14 December 1858 (aged 49); Dublin
- Occupation: Presbyterian minister

Alexander Porter Goudy (February 1809 – 14 December 1858) was an Irish Presbyterian minister.

== Biography ==
Goudy was the son of the Rev. Andrew Goudy (Presbyterian minister of Ballywalter, co. Down, from 1802 to 1818), by Matilda, daughter of the Rev. James Porter of Greyabbey (who was executed in 1798 for supposed complicity in the designs of the United Irishmen). Goudy was born near Ballywalter in February 1809, and after attending school at the Belfast Academical Institution, he entered its collegiate department in November 1823. He distinguished himself in several of the classes, and gained some reputation in the college debating society, where his chief rival was Thomas Hagan, afterwards Lord–Chancellor O'Hagan.

He was licensed by the presbytery of Bangor 29 December 1830, and ordained as assistant and successor to the Rev. James Sinclair of Glastry (not far from his birthplace), 20 September 1831. On 20 March 1833, he was installed in Strabane, where he continued minister till his death.

In 1839, he became involved in a somewhat notable controversy on the merits of episcopacy. The Rev. Archibald Boyd, then curate in Derry Cathedral, subsequently dean of Exeter, had issued ‘Sermons on the Church’ in 1838, in which he attacked presbyterianism. In 1839, four ministers of the synod of Ulster, of whom Goudy was one, published a reply entitled ‘Presbyterianism Defended, and the Arguments of Modern Advocates of Prelacy examined and refuted’. The other authors were the Revs. William Dool Killen of Raphoe, afterwards professor of church history in the assembly's college, Belfast, William McClure and James Denham, ministers in Londonderry. Boyd having replied in a book entitled ‘Episcopacy, Ordination, Lay Eldership, and Liturgies, in five letters,’ the four ministers published ‘The Plea of Presbytery,’ which soon became a standard work on the subject. This Boyd reviewed in ‘Misrepresentation Refuted,’ which called forth ‘Mene Tekel’ from the four ministers. The last work in the controversy was by Boyd, and was entitled ‘Episcopacy and Presbytery.’ Goudy's part in this battle of the books was very ably done.

Shortly after he took a large share in the agitation caused by a decision of the House of Lords (elicited by an appeal from the Irish courts), which affirmed the invalidity of a marriage celebrated by a Presbyterian minister, where one of the parties was an episcopalian. This legal decision was made after an English soldier had married a local Presbyterian girl, and then gone on to marry another woman. This agitation was ended by the passing of the Marriages (Ireland) Act (7 & 8 Victoria, chap. 81), which legalises all such marriages.

Goudy, along with Richard Dill and John Brown, was involved in the establishment of a Presbyterian college.

From this time Goudy took rank as one of the leading debaters in his church, and had a prominent part in all its business.

In 1851 he received the degree of D.D. from Jefferson College, U.S. In 1857, he became moderator of the general assembly. He died unexpectedly in Dublin 14 December 1858; he had travelled to the city to attend Rev. Richard Dill’s funeral.

In addition to the works mentioned above he published several sermons and pamphlets.

== Family ==
In 1846, he married Isabella Kinross of Ayr. Their eldest son, Henry Goudy was a jurist, a professor of civil law in Edinburgh University, and regius professor of civil law at Oxford 1893–1919.
