= 20th Texas Infantry Regiment =

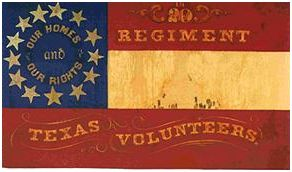
- Country: Confederate States of America
- Allegiance: Texas
- Branch: Confederate States Army
- Role: Infantry
- Nickname: Elmore's Regiment
- Engagements: American Civil War: Battle of Galveston

Commanders
- Notable commanders: Colonel Henry M. Elmore

The 20th Texas Infantry Regiment was an infantry regiment that served in the Confederate States Army during the American Civil War.

== Service ==
The 20th Texas Infantry was composed mainly of middle-aged men and commanded by Colonel Henry M. Elmore. It was part of the District of Texas, New Mexico, and Arizona, also known as the Third Corps under General John B. Magruder. Their main purpose was to guard the Sabine River and to protect the city of Galveston, Texas. They saw little action until the Battle of Galveston in January 1863, in which they served with distinction, for which their action were commended by Confederate President Jefferson Davis.

On May 26, 1865, at New Orleans, the 20th Texas Infantry was surrendered to Federal forces as part of General Edmund Kirby Smith's Confederate Trans-Mississippi Department, with Lt. Gen. Simon B. Buckner acting in Smiths name.

== Commanders ==
- Colonel Henry M. Elmore
- Lieutenant Colonel Leonard A. Abercrombie
- Major Robert E. Bell

== See also ==
- Texas Civil War Confederate Units
- Texas in the American Civil War
