= Jacques Dupré =

American politician (1773–1846)

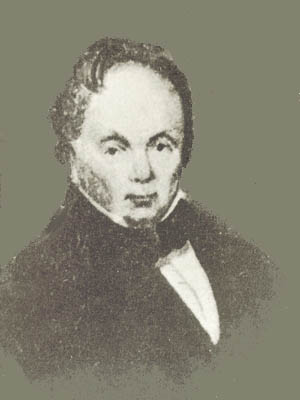

8th Governor of Louisiana
- In office January 14, 1830 – January 31, 1831
- Preceded by: Armand Beauvais
- Succeeded by: André B. Roman

Member of the Louisiana House of Representatives
- In office 1816-1817; 1823-1825

Member of the Louisiana State Senate
- In office 1828–1846

Personal details
- Born: February 12, 1773 New Orleans, Louisiana
- Died: September 14, 1846 (aged 73) Opelousas, Louisiana, U.S.
- Party: Whig
- Spouse: Théotiste Roy
- Children: 7

Jacques Dupré (February 12, 1773 – September 14, 1846) was an Louisiana Creole politician who served as a Louisiana State Representative, State Senator and as the acting Governor of Louisiana from January 14, 1830 to January 31, 1831.

== Biography ==
Born in New Orleans the eldest son of Laurent Dupré de Terrebonne (or, Dupré d'Arbonne) and Marie Joséphine Fontenot, Dupré was a creole of full French descent that grew up in St. Landry Parish, Louisiana. When he was ten years old, his father died and his mother remarried.

In 1791, he and his brothers received Royal Spanish grants on Bayou Boeuf. The next year Dupré married Théotiste Roy of Pointe Coupée Parish, in Opelousas. They raised seven children on a ranch northwest of Opelousas. Beginning in 1815, Dupré served as a Major in the 16th Regiment of the Louisiana Militia. He saw combat at the Battle of New Orleans along with two of his sons.

First elected to the Louisiana House of Representatives in 1816, Dupré was re-elected in 1822 and 1824. In 1828, Dupré was elected to the Louisiana State Senate. In 1830, Dupré was chosen as President of the Senate when Governor Pierre Derbigny died, and Senate President Armand Beauvais assumed the duties of acting governor.

When Beauvais resigned two months later, Dupré became acting governor. He was the second acting governor within the year and there was a constitutional crisis over the lack of an elected governor. The result was that a special election was called in 1831. The dispute over who succeeds the governor in case of his death would not be solved until the office of lieutenant governor was created in a new constitution in 1845.

As governor, Dupré oversaw the incorporation of the first railroad, a canal company, a bayou improvement company, the Merchants Insurance Company of New Orleans, and a company to granulate sugar by a new process. During his administration there was also a prohibition of further immigration of free persons of color into the state and the expulsion of all those who entered since 1825. Also in 1830, the seat of government returned to New Orleans from Donaldsonville.

Dupré did not run for governor in 1831 and when Andre B. Roman was elected, Dupré returned to the State Senate, where he served 16 more years. He served another stint as President of the Senate during 1838.

On September 14, 1846, Dupré died and was buried in Opelousas, Louisiana.

Political offices
Preceded by Armand Beauvais	Governor of Louisiana; 1830–1831	Succeeded by Andre B. Roman
