= Edward D. White Sr. =

American politician

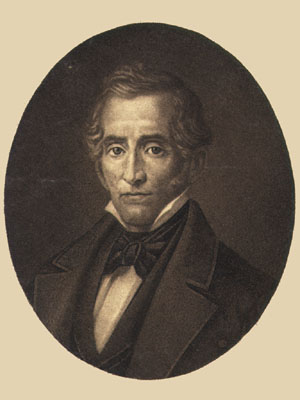

10th Governor of Louisiana
- In office February 4, 1835 – February 4, 1839
- Preceded by: Andre B. Roman
- Succeeded by: Andre B. Roman

Member of the U.S. House of Representatives from Louisiana's 1st district
- In office March 4, 1829 – November 15, 1834
- Preceded by: Edward Livingston
- Succeeded by: Henry Johnson
- In office March 4, 1839 – March 3, 1843
- Preceded by: Henry Johnson
- Succeeded by: John Slidell

Personal details
- Born: Edward Douglass White, Sr. March 3, 1795 Maury County, Tennessee
- Died: April 18, 1847 (aged 52) New Orleans, Louisiana, U.S.
- Resting place: St. Joseph's Catholic Cemetery in Thibodaux, Louisiana
- Party: Whig
- Spouse: Catherine Sidney Lee (Ringgold)
- Education: University of Nashville (LL.B)

Edward Douglass White (March 3, 1795 – April 18, 1847) was a 19th-century American lawyer and politician who served as the tenth governor of Louisiana and a member of the United States House of Representatives. He served five terms in Congress between 1829 and 1843 as an adherent of Henry Clay of Kentucky and the Whig Party.

== Biography ==
White was born in Maury County, Tennessee, the illegitimate son of James White. (Although his parents apparently never married, his father acknowledged him, and the circumstances of his birth did not impede his education or future success.) James White was a delegate to the Congress of the Confederation from North Carolina. While a young boy, Edward moved with his father to Louisiana.

In 1815, White graduated from the former University of Nashville, afterward beginning a law practice in Donaldsonville, Louisiana, the seat of Ascension Parish, south of Baton Rouge. Ten years later, he was appointed by Governor Henry S. Johnson, also of Donaldsonville, as an Associate Judge of the New Orleans Municipal Court in 1825.

In 1834, he married Catherine Sidney Lee Ringgold, daughter of Tench Ringgold, long the U.S. Marshal in the District of Columbia. Their children included Edward Douglass White Jr.

White was a slaveholder.

=== Political career ===
Elected to the 21st United States Congress in 1828, White served three terms from 1829 until his resignation in 1834 after being elected as governor. He served a single term as governor from 1835 to 1839. Afterward, he was elected to the U.S. Congress again, serving two more terms from 1839 until 1843.

=== Lioness incident ===
White was among the survivors of the steamboat Lioness explosion that occurred on the Red River south of Natchitoches on May 19, 1833.

=== Death and burial ===
He died in New Orleans and was buried at St. Joseph's Catholic Cemetery in Thibodaux, Louisiana.

His home in Thibodaux is now operated by the Louisiana State Museum as the Edward Douglass White Historic Site.

=== Family ===
White's son Edward Douglass White Jr. was elected by the state legislature as a United States senator from Louisiana. He later was appointed as an associate justice of the United States Supreme Court by President Grover Cleveland in 1894 and as the 9th Chief Justice by President William Howard Taft in 1910.

== Sources ==
- United States Congress. "Edward D. White Sr. (id: W000365)". Biographical Directory of the United States Congress.
- Political Graveyard

Party political offices
First	Whig nominee for Governor of Louisiana; 1834	Succeeded by Andre B. Roman
U.S. House of Representatives
Preceded by Edward Livingston	Member of the U.S. House of Representatives from Louisiana's 1st congressional district 1829–1834	Succeeded by Henry Johnson
Preceded by Henry Johnson	Member of the U.S. House of Representatives from Louisiana's 1st congressional district 1839–1843	Succeeded by John Slidell
Political offices
Preceded by Andre B. Roman	Governor of Louisiana; 1835–1839	Succeeded by Andre B. Roman
