= Pierre Derbigny =

American judge

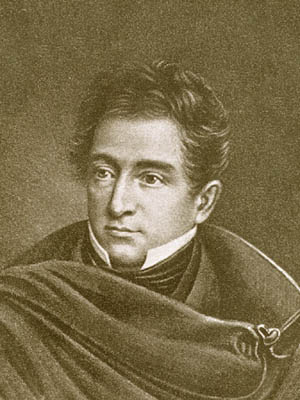

6th Governor of Louisiana
- In office December 15, 1828 – October 6, 1829
- Preceded by: Henry S. Johnson
- Succeeded by: Armand Beauvais

Secretary of State of Louisiana
- In office 1820–1828
- Governor: Thomas B. Robertson; Henry S. Thibodaux; Henry Johnson
- Preceded by: Etienne Mazureau
- Succeeded by: George A. Waggaman

Justice of the Louisiana Supreme Court
- In office 1813–1820

Personal details
- Born: June 30, 1769 Laon, France
- Died: October 6, 1829 (aged 60) Gretna, Louisiana, U.S.
- Party: National Republican; Whig
- Spouse: Felicité Odile de Lassus
- Children: 7

Pierre Derbigny (June 30, 1769 – October 6, 1829) was a French born judge and politician who served as the sixth governor of Louisiana. He was an advocate of integrating Louisiana into the United States and played a central role in the establishment of Louisiana's legal system.

== Early life ==
Pierre Augustin Bourguignon Derbigny was born in Laon, France, on June 30, 1769, the eldest son of Louise Angélique Blondela and Augustin Bourguignon d'Herbigny. His father was President of the Directoire de l'Aisne and Mayor of Laon.

Derbigny studied law at Ste. Genevieve but fled France in 1791 during the French Revolution. He first went to Saint-Domingue, and then arrived in Pittsburgh, Pennsylvania, and finally settled in New Orleans, then part of the Spanish Colony. After the Louisiana Purchase in 1803, he became private secretary to Etienne Bore, first mayor of New Orleans, and was appointed Secretary of the Legislative Council. In the same year Governor Claiborne appointed him official interpreter of languages for the territory.

== Career ==
Derbigny was one of the representatives who travelled to Washington D.C. seeking self-government for the Orleans Territory. The U.S. Congress approved and in 1805 a territorial legislature was established in Louisiana which included an elected lower house. While in Washington, he also protested against the 1804 closing of the slave trade.

As the territory was integrated into the United States, Derbigny opposed British common law in Louisiana and defended the retention of civil law practices established during the French and Spanish colonial periods. Following the Governance Act of 1804 that set up Louisiana's territorial government, Derbigny, along with Jean Noel Destréhan and Pierre Sauve, delivered to Washington, D.C., the protest created by citizens speaking out against this Congressional Act. This complaint was entitled, "Remonstrance of the People of Louisiana against the Political System Adopted by Congress for Them," and was ultimately presented to President Thomas Jefferson by the three men from Louisiana.

Pierre Derbigny also led a movement to establish the College of Orleans and served as Regent. In 1812, he was selected as Secretary of the Territorial Senate. He also served in Captain Chauveneau's Company of cavalry in the Louisiana Militia.

He resigned from the Legislature to become a justice of the Louisiana Supreme Court. His nomination was first rejected by the Senate, but was afterwards returned and confirmed at the Senate's request. He served as a Justice from 1814 to 1820.

In 1820, Derbigny resigned from the Supreme Court of Louisiana to run unsuccessfully for Governor against J. N. Destréhan, Abner L. Duncan, and Thomas B. Robertson. Despite his loss to Robertson, Derbigny was appointed Secretary of State of Louisiana and served from 1821 to 1828. He was one of the principal drafters of the 1825 Civil Code of Louisiana, along with Edward Livingston, François Xavier Martin, and Louis Moreau-Lislet.

In 1828, he ran for Governor again and this time defeated his former supporter Bernard de Marigny, Thomas Butler, and Congressman Philemon Thomas. The Louisiana State Legislature confirmed his election over the other three candidates. Derbigny was affiliated with the nascent National Republican Party, an anti-Jackson group.

In Derbigny's inauguration speech, he urged internal improvements, which the legislature supported, including: incorporation of a gas light company for New Orleans, several navigation companies for the Mississippi River and important bayous in the state, and the construction and repair of levees. On October 3, 1829, after ten months in office, Governor Derbigny was thrown from a (horse-drawn) carriage and died three days later, in Gretna, Louisiana. Pierre Derbigny was interred in Saint Louis Cemetery Number 1 in New Orleans.

== Personal life ==
Derbigny married Felicité Odile de Hault de Lassus with whom he had five daughters and two sons. The Derbigny family lived on the Derbigny Plantation in Gretna. His son Charles Zenon Derbigny was the 14th Speaker of the Louisiana House of Representatives and a candidate for governor in the 1855 Louisiana gubernatorial election.

== See also ==
- List of United States governors born outside the United States

== Sources ==
- State of Louisiana - Biography

Legal offices
Preceded by newly created position	Justice of the Louisiana Supreme Court; 1813–1821; Chief Justice May 29, 1813 – 1821	Succeeded by Alexander Porter
Political offices
Preceded by Etienne Mazureau	Louisiana Secretary of State; 1821–1828	Succeeded by George Waggaman
Preceded by Henry S. Johnson	Governor of Louisiana; 1828–1829	Succeeded by Armand Beauvais
