= President of the Louisiana State Senate =

Position in the Louisiana State Senate

- Incumbent; Cameron Henry since January 8, 2024
- Appointer: Louisiana State Senate
- Term length: Four years
- Inaugural holder: Julien Poydras
- Formation: 1812
- Succession: 5th

The president of the Louisiana State Senate is the highest-ranking member of the Louisiana State Senate. The president convenes the session and calls members to order, and can designate another state senator as the presiding officer.

The Louisiana state senate president is fifth in gubernatorial line of succession in Louisiana. The president's counterpart in the lower house of the Louisiana Legislature is the Speaker of the Louisiana House of Representatives, currently Republican Phillip DeVillier.

== History ==
The Louisiana Constitution of 1812 did not provide for a lieutenant governor to preside over the state senate and allowed the president of the state senate to succeed the governor. The first senate president to succeed to the governorship was Henry S. Thibodaux, who succeeded to the position in 1824 after the resignation of Governor Thomas B. Robertson. In 1829, Governor Pierre Derbigny died in a carriage accident, allowing for Armand Beauvais to become acting governor. Beauvais resigned after only three months in 1830 to run in the special election to fill the post. The new senate president, Jacques Dupré, became the new acting governor until he resigned in 1831 and was replaced by governor-elect André B. Roman.

In the Louisiana Constitution of 1846, the Lieutenant Governor of Louisiana assumed the functions of the state senate presidency. During the Civil War there were two lieutenant governors, one union, and one confederate, as there were two separate state governments. The lieutenant governor presided over the Louisiana State Senate from 1853 until the adoption of the Louisiana constitution of 1974. In past years, the president of the state Senate was selected by the governor from among the state senators and was confirmed by their vote. Since 2016, legislators have exerted independence from the governor and chosen their own leaders.

== Powers and duties ==
Although the president is not the only state senator who can serve as a presiding officer, he holds the power to assign the presiding officer in his absence. During session, the presiding officer controls the flow of debate on the Senate floor, and decides questions of order.

The president controls the state senate offices and chamber, determines the physical arrangement and security of the chamber and committee rooms.

As a state senator, the president is entitled to participate in debate and to vote.

According to Article 4, Section 14, of the Louisiana Constitution, the president is fifth in the gubernatorial line of succession.

== List of presidents since 1812 ==
#	President	Party	Start of service	End of service
1	Julien Poydras	Democratic-Republican	1812	1813
2	Fulwar Skipwith	Democratic-Republican	1814	1815
3	Nathaniel Meriam	Democratic-Republican	1816	1819
4	Julien Poydras	Democratic-Republican	1820	1821
5	Bernard de Marigny	Democratic-Republican	1822	1822
6	Henry S. Thibodaux	National Republican	1823	1826
7	Armand Beauvais	National Republican	1827	1829
8	Jacques Dupré	Whig	1830	1830
9	Isaac A. Smith	Whig	1830	1831
10	Charles Derbigny	Whig	1832	1837
11	Joseph E. Johnston	Whig	1838	1838
12	Jacques Dupré	Whig	1838	1838
13	Felix Garcia	Whig	1839	1845
14	Trasimond Landry	Democratic	1846	1850
15	Jean Baptiste Plauché	Democratic	1850	1853
16	W. W. Farmer	Democratic	1853	1854
17	Robert C. Wickliffe	Democratic	1854	1856
18	Charles H. Mouton	Democratic	1856	1856
19	William F. Griffin	Democratic	1856	1860
20	Henry M. Hyams	Democratic	1860	1864
21	Benjamin W. Pearce	Democratic	1864	1865
22	J. Madison Wells	Republican	1864	1864
23	Charles Smith	Republican	1864	1864
24	Charles W. Boyce	Republican	1864	1864
25	Louis Gastinel	Republican	1864	1865
26	Victor Burthe	Democratic	1865	1865
27	Albert Voorhies	Democratic	1866	1867
28	Oscar J. Dunn	Republican	1868	1871
29	P. B. S. Pinchback	Republican	1871	1872
30	A. B. Harris	Republican	1872	1873
31	C. C. Antoine	Republican	1873	1877
32	Louis A. Wiltz	Democratic	1877	1880
33	Samuel Douglas McEnery	Democratic	1880	1881
34	W. A. Robertson	Democratic	1881	1881
35	George L. Walton	Democratic	1881	1884
36	Clay Knobloch	Democratic	1884	1888
37	James Jeffries	Democratic	1888	1892
38	Charles Parlange	Democratic	1892	1893
39	Hiram R. Lott	Democratic	1893	1896
40	Robert H. Snyder	Democratic	1896	1900
41	Albert Estopinal	Democratic	1900	1904
42	Jared Y. Sanders, Sr.	Democratic	1904	1908
43	Paul M. Lambremont	Democratic	1908	1912
44	Thomas C. Barret	Democratic	1912	1916
45	Fernand Mouton	Democratic	1916	1920
46	Hewitt Bouanchaud	Democratic	1920	1924
47	Delos R. Johnson	Democratic	1924	1924
48	Oramel H. Simpson	Democratic	1924	1926
49	Philip H. Gilbert	Democratic	1926	1928
50	Paul N. Cyr	Democratic	1932	1931
51	Alvin Olin King	Democratic	1931	1932
52	John B. Fournet	Democratic	1932	1935
53	Thomas C. Wingate	Democratic	1935	1935
54	James A. Noe	Democratic	1935	1936
55	Earl K. Long	Democratic	1936	1939
56	Coleman Lindsey	Democratic	1939	1940
57	Marc M. Mouton	Democratic	1940	1944
58	J. Emile Verret	Democratic	1944	1948
59	William J. Dodd	Democratic	1948	1952
60	C. E. "Cap" Barham	Democratic	1952	1956
61	Lether Frazar	Democratic	1956	1960
62	C. C. "Taddy" Aycock	Democratic	1960	1972
63	James E. Fitzmorris, Jr.	Democratic	1972	1976
64	Michael H. O'Keefe	Democratic	1976	1983
65	Samuel B. Nunez, Jr.	Democratic	1983	1988
66	Allen Bares	Democratic	1988	1990
67	Samuel B. Nunez, Jr.	Democratic	1990	1996
68	Randy L. Ewing	Democratic	1996	2000
69	John J. Hainkel, Jr.	Republican	2000	2004
70	Donald E. Hines, M.D.	Democratic	2004	2008
71	Joel T. Chaisson, II	Democratic	2008	2012
72	John A. Alario, Jr.	Republican	2012	2020
73	Patrick Page Cortez	Republican	2020	2024
74	Cameron Henry	Republican	2024	Incumbent

== President pro tempore ==
The President pro tempore is appointed in the same way as the president. The President pro tempore acts as presiding officer in the absence of the president. If the chair is ever permanently vacated the President pro tempore acts as the temporary presiding officer until the Senate elects a new president. The President pro tempore, though not vested with much power, is usually a senior and influencial senator. The position has existed since the foundation of the Senate in 1812, but it did not become a permanent position until 1880.

=== List of presidents pro tempore since 1880 ===
#	President pro tempore	Party	Start of service	End of service
1	W. A. Robertson	Democratic	1880	1881
2	George L. Walton	Democratic	1881	1884
3	Robert C. Davey	Democratic	1884	1888
4	Murphy J. Foster	Democratic	1888	1892
5	Hiram R. Lott	Democratic	1892	1896
6	Albert Estopinal	Democratic	1896	1900
7	Hugh C. Cage	Democratic	1900	1904
8	Paul M. Lambremont	Democratic	1904	1908
9	Thomas C. Barret	Democratic	1908	1912
10	Joseph Voegtle	Democratic	1912	1913
11	A. K. Amacker	Democratic	1913	1916
12	E. M. Stafford	Democratic	1916	1920
13	Delos R. Johnson	Democratic	1920	1924
14	Philip H. Gilbert	Democratic	1924	1928
15	Alvin Olin King	Democratic	1928	1932
16	Thomas C. Wingate	Democratic	1932	1935
17	James A. Noe	Democratic	1935	1936
18	Coleman Lindsey	Democratic	1936	1940
19	Frank B. Ellis	Democratic	1940	1944
20	Grove Stafford	Democratic	1944	1948
21	Dudley J. LeBlanc	Democratic	1948	1952
22	Robert A. Ainsworth Jr.	Democratic	1952	1956
23	W. J. Cleveland	Democratic	1956	1960
24	Robert A. Ainsworth Jr.	Democratic	1960	1961
25	Sylvan Friedman	Democratic	1961	1964
26	E. W. Gravolet, Jr.	Democratic	1964	1968
27	Jamar W. Adcock	Democratic	1968	1972
28	Michael H. O’Keefe	Democratic	1972	1976
29	Edgar G. Mouton	Democratic	1976	1980
30	Samuel B. Nunez, Jr.	Democratic	1980	1983
31	Theodore M. Hickey	Democratic	1983	1984
32	Thomas H. Hudson	Democratic	1984	1988
33	Samuel B. Nunez, Jr.	Democratic	1988	1990
34	Leonard J. Chabert	Democratic	1990	1992
35	Dennis R. Bagneris, Sr.	Democratic	1992	1999
36	Ronald Clarence Bean	Republican	1999	2000
37	Louis J. Lambert	Democratic	2000	2004
38	Diana E. Bajoie	Democratic	2004	2008
39	Sharon Weston Broome	Democratic	2008	2016
40	Gerald Long	Republican	2016	2020
41	Beth Mizell	Republican	2020	2024
42	Regina Barrow	Democratic	2024	Incumbent

== See also ==
- Governor of Louisiana
- Lieutenant Governor of Louisiana
- Speaker of the Louisiana House of Representatives
- List of Louisiana state legislatures
