= Louisiana Highway 3 =

State highway in Louisiana, United States

Louisiana Highway 3

- Route of LA 3 highlighted in red

Route information
- Maintained by Louisiana DOTD
- Length: 35.705 mi (57.462 km)
- Existed: 1955 renumbering–present

Major junctions
- South end: I-20 / US 71 / LA 72 in Bossier City
- US 79 / US 80 in Bossier City; I-220 in Bossier City; LA 2 in Plain Dealing
- North end: AR 29 at Arkansas state line north of Plain Dealing

Location
- Country: United States
- State: Louisiana
- Parishes: Bossier

Highway system
- Louisiana State Highway System; Interstate; US; State; Scenic
← LA 2	→ LA 4

Louisiana Highway 3 (LA 3) is a state highway located in Bossier Parish, Louisiana. It runs 35.71 miles (57.47 km) in a north–south direction from the junction of Interstate 20 (I-20), U.S. Highway 71 (US 71), and LA 72 in Bossier City to the Arkansas state line north of Plain Dealing.

LA 3 connects Bossier City, the largest city in Bossier Parish, with the town of Benton, the parish seat. Apart from the interchange with I-20 and US 71 at its southern terminus, LA 3 also connects to I-220, the northern bypass of Shreveport and Bossier City. North of Benton, LA 3 passes through Plain Dealing, where it intersects LA 2, Louisiana's northernmost cross-state route.

== Route description ==
From the south, LA 3 begins at an intersection with LA 72 (Old Minden Road) in Bossier City. Opposite this intersection are ramps leading to a partial interchange with I-20 and US 71 at the point where the two highways begin a concurrency across the Red River westward into Shreveport. Traffic from southbound LA 3 can enter I-20 westbound only (concurrent with northbound US 71), and traffic from eastbound I-20 (concurrent with southbound US 71) can exit to LA 3 north at exit 20B. All movements are allowed between LA 3 and US 71.

From this intersection, LA 3 proceeds north along Benton Spur, an undivided four-lane thoroughfare with a center turning lane, and continues onto an overpass across the Kansas City Southern Railway (KCS) tracks. It then intersects the concurrent US 79/US 80 at East Texas Street. US 79 and US 80 head west across the Red River into Shreveport and eastward parallel to I-20 into Minden. LA 3 continues northward and enters an interchange with I-220 (exit 11), a northern bypass of Shreveport that connects to I-20 westbound toward Dallas, Texas and eastbound toward Monroe. Shortly after this interchange, LA 3 crosses out of the Bossier City limits, and the center turning lane is replaced by a median. Over the next 7.0 miles (11.3 km), LA 3 continues northward, closely following the Union Pacific Railroad (UP) tracks through points such as Vanceville and Willow Chute, before entering Benton, the seat of Bossier Parish.

Upon entering town, LA 3 narrows to an undivided four-lane highway. At 5th Street, LA 3 intersects LA 162, which heads east toward the Cypress-Black Bayou Recreation Area. LA 3 narrows again to an undivided two-lane highway just before crossing out of Benton and remains in that capacity for the remainder of its route. Shortly thereafter, the highway crosses over to the west side of the Union Pacific Railroad via an overpass. Continuing northward for another 5.4 miles (8.7 km), LA 3 intersects LA 160 at a point near Hughes. LA 160 heads west through Rocky Mount to Cotton Valley in Webster Parish.

Now separated from the railroad, LA 3 continues north for another 8.2 miles (13.2 km) to an intersection with LA 2 (Mary Lee Street) in the town of Plain Dealing, where it gains the local name of Louisiana Street. LA 2 heads west to Hosston and Vivian, connecting to US 71 and LA 1 at those respective points, and east toward US 371 at Sarepta. Several blocks east of this intersection, LA 157 heads northeast to Springhill at the Arkansas state line.

2.3 miles (3.7 km) north of Plain Dealing, LA 3 intersects LA 537 at a point known as Bolinger. LA 3 continues northward for a final 5.0 miles (8.0 km) before reaching the Arkansas state line and continuing as Arkansas Highway 29 toward Bradley.

== History ==
In the original Louisiana Highway system in use between 1921 and 1955, the entire route of the modern LA 3 was part of State Route 10. LA 3 was created in the 1955 Louisiana Highway renumbering, and its route has remained the same apart for two minor shifts at the southern terminus in Bossier City.

In the summer of 1966, I-20 was opened in Bossier City from the Red River Bridge at Traffic Street to Barksdale Boulevard (US 71). As part of this construction, the southernmost portion of LA 3 was shifted onto a new connector, 0.3 miles (0.48 km) in length, known as Benton Spur in order to be aligned with a partial interchange with I-20 at LA 72 (Old Minden Road). The former route along Benton Road then became LA 3 Spur until its deletion from the state highway system in 2010.

The second and most recent route change occurred in January 2008 upon completion of the Benton Road Overpass, also in Bossier City. This overpass was constructed on the west side of the existing at-grade crossing of the Kansas City Southern Railway which was formerly a source of traffic congestion on Benton Road.

== Major intersections ==
The entire highway is in Bossier Parish.

Location	mi	km	Destinations	Notes
Bossier City	0.000	0.000	I-20 west / US 71 north – Shreveport US 71 south (Barksdale Boulevard) LA 72 (Old Minden Road) to I-20 east	Southern terminus; exit 20B–C on I-20; direct access to westbound I-20 only
Bossier City	0.856– 0.938	1.378– 1.510	US 79 / US 80 (East Texas Street)	
Bossier City	2.892– 3.084	4.654– 4.963	I-220 – Monroe, Dallas	Exit 11 on I-220
Benton	12.872	20.715	LA 162 east (5th Street)	Western terminus of LA 162; to Cypress-Black Bayou Recreation Area
	19.422	31.257	LA 160 – Rocky Mount, Cotton Valley	
Plain Dealing	27.591– 27.642	44.403– 44.485	LA 2 (West Mary Lee Street) – Hosston, Sarepta, Springhill	
	30.689	49.389	LA 537 west	Northeastern terminus of LA 537
	35.705	57.462	AR 29 north – Bradley	Northern terminus; continuation in Arkansas
1.000 mi = 1.609 km; 1.000 km = 0.621 mi: Incomplete access

== Spur route ==
Louisiana Highway 3 Spur
- Location: Bossier City
- Length: 0.26 mi (420 m)
- Existed: 1966–2010

Louisiana Highway 3 Spur (LA 3 Spur) ran a distance of 0.26 miles (0.42 km) along Benton Road in Bossier City. It provided an alternate connection to LA 72 at the southern terminus of LA 3.

The route was added in 1966 when LA 3 was slightly re-routed to connect with the ramps to the newly constructed section of I-20 between the Red River Bridge at Traffic Street and US 71 at Barksdale Boulevard. LA 3 Spur was deleted from the state highway system in 2010 and returned to local control.

The entire highway was in Bossier City, Bossier Parish.

mi	km	Destinations	Notes
0.00	0.00	LA 72 (Old Minden Road)	Southern terminus
0.26	0.42	LA 3 (Benton Spur Road, Benton Road)	Northern terminus
1.000 mi = 1.609 km; 1.000 km = 0.621 mi
