= Harvey Peltier =

Harvey Peltier may refer to:

- Harvey Peltier Jr. (1923–1980), American politician
- Harvey Peltier Sr. (1899–1977), American attorney, banker, businessman and politician
