= Senator Peltier =

Senator Peltier may refer to:

- Harvey Peltier Jr. (1923–1980), Louisiana State Senate
- Harvey Peltier Sr. (1899–1977), Louisiana State Senate
- Wanda Jo Peltier (1933–2023), Oklahoma State Senate
