= William Clark Hughes =

American politician (1868–1930)

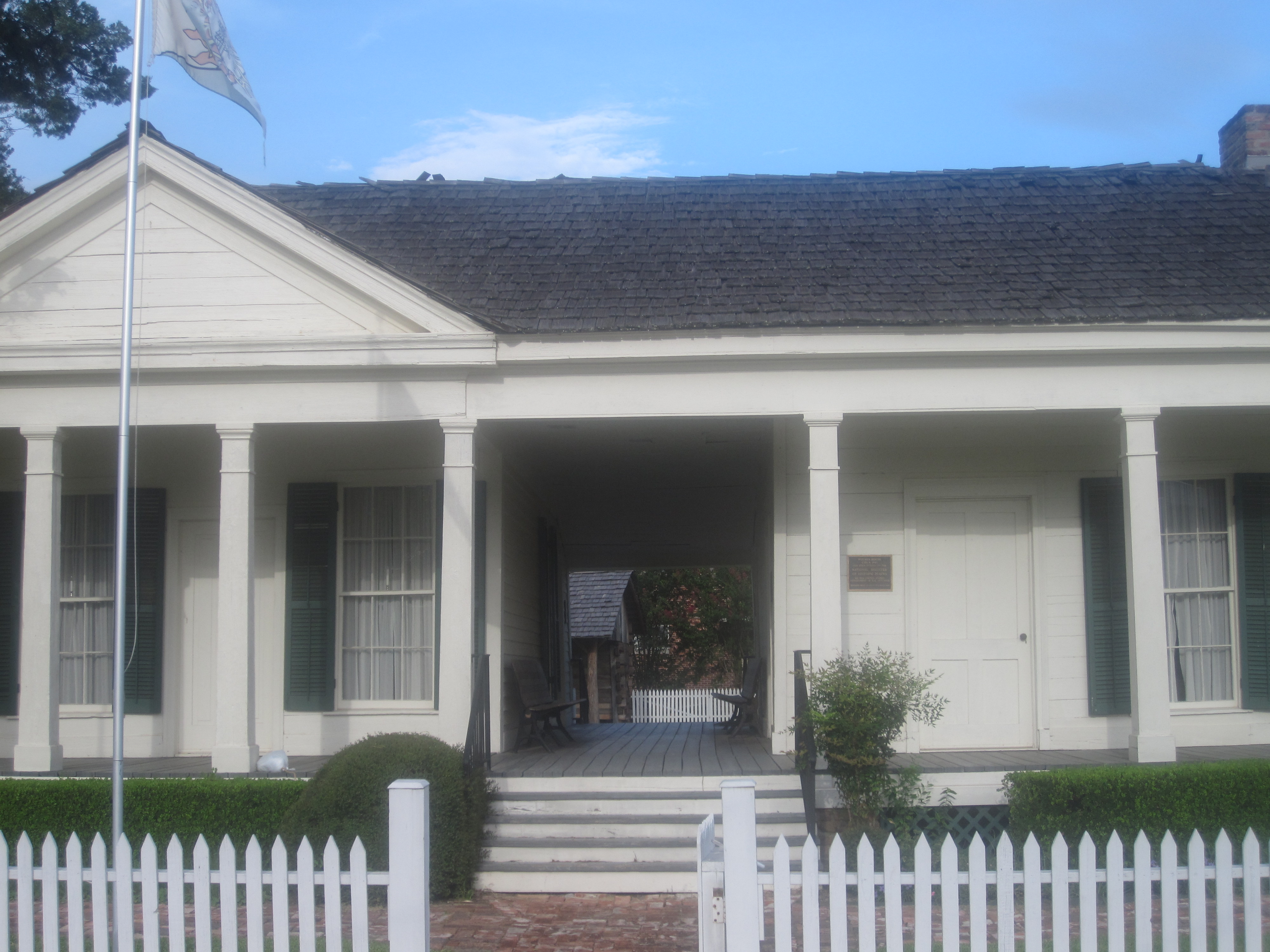
- The 19th-century boyhood home of Hughes in Rocky Mount was moved in 1995 to Benton Square in Benton, Louisiana

Louisiana State Representative from Bossier Parish
- In office 1904–1930
- Preceded by: At-large members: J. T. Manry L. T. Sanders
- Succeeded by: J. E. Walker

Speaker of the Louisiana House of Representatives
- In office 1926–1928
- Preceded by: James Stuart Douglas
- Succeeded by: John B. Fournet

Personal details
- Born: January 31, 1868 Rocky Mount, Louisiana, US
- Died: August 29, 1930 (aged 62) Kingston Plantation, Louisiana, US
- Cause of death: Lightning
- Resting place: Rocky Mount Cemetery in Bossier Parish
- Party: Democratic
- Spouse(s): (1) Lula Dubois Holt (died 1899) (2) Annie Oliver (married 1904)
- Occupation: Farmer

William Clark Hughes (January 31, 1868 – August 29, 1930) was an American Democrat who served from 1926 to 1928 as the Speaker of the Louisiana House of Representatives. He represented Bossier Parish in the lower house of the legislature from 1904 until his accidental death in 1930.

Hughes was born in the Rocky Mount community of Bossier Parish to William Josiah Hughes, a captain in the Confederate Army, and the former Mary Ann Clark. His home in Rocky Mount remained in the family until 1972, when it was donated to the Bossier Restoration Foundation. In 1995, the house was relocated to Benton, the seat of Bossier Parish government. There the Hughes House sets in Benton Square near the Bossier Parish School Board office.

Hughes and his first wife, Lula Dubois Hughes (1869-1899), had three daughters: Mary Virginia (born and died 1894), Martha "Mattie" L. Hughes Dowdell (1895-1970), and Margery Hughes O'Kelley (1896-1973). Hughes later married Annie Oliver, who was born 1882 in Giles County, Tennessee. They had one daughter, Annie Elizabeth Hughes Hale Tucker, who was born in 1906 in Shreveport, Louisiana.

Hughes' legislative service traversed the administrations of seven governors from Newton C. Blanchard to Huey Pierce Long, Jr. He was Speaker of the House under Long's short-term predecessor, Oramel H. Simpson; in Louisiana despite the presumed separation of powers between the executive and legislative branches, the governor handpicks the Speaker. Long chose his lieutenant, John B. Fournet, a freshman member from Jeff Davis Parish in southwestern Louisiana, who later became the long-term Chief Justice of the Louisiana Supreme Court.

Hughes operated the Kingston Plantation in the Bossier Parish community known as Hughes Spur, presumably named for Hughes' father. In 1930, at the age of sixty-two and still serving in the legislature, he was struck dead by touching a metal cistern which had been electrically charged in a lightning storm. He had intended to use the cistern to fight a lightning-induced fire on his farm.

Hughes is interred at the Rocky Mount Cemetery.

Preceded by At-large members: J. T. Manry L. T. Sanders	Louisiana State Representative from Bossier Parish; 1904–1930	Succeeded by J. E. Walker
Preceded by James Stuart Douglas	Speaker of the Louisiana House of Representatives; 1926–1928	Succeeded by John B. Fournet
