= Lee Emmett Thomas =

American politician from Louisiana (1866–1935)

Speaker of the Louisiana House of Representatives
- In office 1912–1916
- Preceded by: Henry Garland Dupré
- Succeeded by: Hewitt Bouanchaud

Member of the Louisiana House of Representatives for Caddo Parish
- In office 1908–1916

Mayor of Shreveport
- In office 1922–1930
- Preceded by: John McWilliams Ford
- Succeeded by: James George Palmer

Personal details
- Born: September 23, 1866 Marion, Louisiana, U.S.
- Died: February 16, 1935 (aged 68) New Orleans, Louisiana, U.S.
- Party: Democratic
- Education: University of Virginia

Lee Emmett Thomas (September 23, 1866 – February 16, 1935) was an American politician who served in the Louisiana House of Representatives and its Speaker as a member of the Democratic party. He also served as the Mayor of Shreveport from 1922 to 1930 and ran unsuccessfully for US Senator for Louisiana against Joseph E. Ransdell in 1924.

== Early life ==
Lee Emmett Thomas was born in Marion, Louisiana, on September 23, 1866, to Burwell Benson Thomas and Susan Sophia George. He graduated from Howard College in 1885, Eastman Commercial College in 1886 and the University of Virginia in 1889 and went on to practice law in Farmerville, Union Parish, Louisiana until 1896 when he moved to Shreveport, Louisiana. There he continued to practice law until 1903. He married Florence Eleanor Smith in 1891.

== Political career ==
Lee Emmett Thomas was appointed as State Bank Commissioner by Governor William Wright Heard, a role which he fulfilled until 1907. The following year, he was elected to the Louisiana House of Representatives for Caddo Parish. Upon his re-election in 1912, Thomas served as Speaker of the Louisiana House of Representatives until the end of his term in 1916. After his departure from the House of representatives, Thomas became the Chairman of the Democratic State Central Committee, which he remained until 1920. In 1919, Thomas was reappointed State Bank Commissioner, a position from which he resigned in November 1922 upon his election as Mayor of Shreveport. Thomas campaigned for US Senator for Louisiana in 1924, challenging incumbent Senator Joseph E. Ransdell in the primaries. However Thomas lost the primary 104,312 votes (54.9%) to his 85,540 votes (45.1%), mainly due to the opposition from future Louisiana Governor Huey Long, who fiercely campaigned in favour of Ransdell.

== Later life and death ==
Lee Emmett Thomas remained Mayor of Shreveport until 1930 and then retired from politics. He died in New Orleans, Louisiana, on February 16, 1935. His body was originally interred at Greenwood Cemetery, but has since been relocated to Forest Park East Cemetery.

== See also ==
- List of speakers of the Louisiana House of Representatives
- Louisiana House of Representatives
- List of mayors of Shreveport

Political offices
Preceded by Henry Garland Dupré	Speaker of the Louisiana House of Representatives; 1912-1916	Succeeded by Hewitt Bouanchaud
Preceded by John McWilliams Ford	Mayor of Shreveport; 1922-1930	Succeeded by James George Palmer
