= List of mayors of Shreveport, Louisiana =

This is a list of people who have served as mayor of the city of Shreveport, Louisiana.

Mayor	From	To	Party	Notes
Angus McNeill	1836	1839	None	President of Shreve Town Co.
John Octavius Sewall	1839	1840	Whig	First Elected Mayor
William Walton George, M.D.	1840	1840	Democratic	
Samuel W. Briggs	1841	1841	None	
William Walton George, M.D.	1842	1843	Democratic	
John N. Howell	1844	1844	Democratic	
Joseph Clinton Beall	1845	1845	Democratic	
Lawrence Pike Crain	1846	1847	Democratic	
Robert Nathaniel Wood	1847	1847	Whig/Know Nothing	Died in Mexico
John Morgan Landrum	1848	1848	Democratic	Elected to Congress in 1859
Rev. John Bryce	1849	1849	Democratic	
Robert W. Cooke	1850	1850	Democratic	
Joseph Clinton Beall	1851	1853	Democratic	
John Wallace Jones	1854	1857	Democratic	
Jonas Robeson	1858	1858	Democratic	
John W. Pennall	1859	1859	Democratic	Also Mayor of Homer, LA and State Judge in 1861
Jonas Robeson	1860	1861	Democratic	
Joseph Clinton Beall	1862	1863	Democratic	
John Gooch, Samuel Wells	1864	1865	Democratic	Gooch was ousted by the Union and was replaced by Wells.
Alexander Boarman	1866	1867	Republican.	Appointed by Union.
Lewis S. Markham	1867	1867	Dem.	Served only one month.
Martin Tally	1867	1868	Republican	Appointed during reconstruction by Union.
Jerome B. Gilmore	1869	1871	Republican	Appointed during reconstruction by Union.
William Rabun Shivers	1871	1871	Dem.	Was killed before he was able to serve term.
Moses Hodge Crowell	1871	1872	Republican	Appointed by the Union.
Joseph Taylor, M.D.	1872	1873	Dem.	Was forbidden to serve by Federal authorities. (Confederate Loyalist)
Samuel Levy, M.A. Walsh	1872	1873	Republican	Jointly appointed by Federal government, Levy was the first Jewish Mayor.
Samuel J. Ward	1874	1874	Democratic	Sheriff of Caddo Parish in 1869. Born in Wales.
W. Nick Murphy	1875	1878	Republican/Democratic	Switched from Republican to Democrat.
Andrew Currie	1878	1889	Democratic	Resigned from his position in 1890. Born in Ireland.
Edward B. Herndon	1890	1890	Democratic	Elected to fill unfinished term.
Richard Tucker Vinson	1891	1895	Democratic	
Reuben Neil McKellar	1896	1900	Democratic	Born in Kickapoo in Anderson County, Texas; moved to Shreveport in his early teens
Benjamin Holzman	1900	1902	Democratic	Born in Germany.
Andrew C. Querbes, Sr.	1902	1906	Democratic	Born in New Orleans.
Ernest Ralph Berstein	1906	1908	Democratic	
Samuel Augustus Dickson, M.D.	1908	1910	Democratic	
John Henry Eastham, Jr.	1910	1914	Democratic	First mayor under city commission government
Samuel Augustus Dickson, M.D.	1914	1916	Democratic	
Robert Hodges Ward	1916	1918	Democratic	Son of Mayor Samuel J. Ward.
John McWilliams Ford	1918	1922	Democratic	
Lee Emmett Thomas	1922	1930	Democratic	Louisiana State Representative, 1912–1916
J. G. Palmer	1930	1932	Democratic	Louisiana State Judge.
John McWilliams Ford	1932	1932	Democratic	
George W. Hardy, Jr.	1932	1934	Democratic	Louisiana State Judge.
Samuel S. Caldwell	1934	1946	Democratic	
Clyde E. Fant	1946	1954	Democratic	
James C. Gardner	1954	1958	Democratic	Louisiana State Representative, 1952–1954
Clyde E. Fant	1958	1970	Democratic	Longest serving term of any Shreveport Mayor.
L. Calhoun Allen, Jr.	1970	1978	Democratic	
William T. Hanna, Jr.	1978	1982	Democratic	
John Brennan Hussey	1982	1990	Democratic	
Hazel Beard	1990	1994	Republican	First female mayor and first Republican mayor since the Reconstruction era
Robert W. "Bo" Williams	1994	1998	Republican	
Keith Hightower	1998	2006	Democratic	
Cedric B. Glover	2006	2014	Democratic	First African-American mayor
Ollie Tyler	2014	2018	Democratic	First African-American female mayor
Adrian Perkins	2018	2022	Democratic	
Tom Arceneaux	2022	Incumbent	Republican	

== See also ==
- Timeline of Shreveport, Louisiana
