= Venetian Islands =

Venetian Islands or Venetian Isles can refer to:

- The islands in the Venetian Lagoon, including Venice, Italy
- Venetian Islands, Florida, USA

== See also ==
- Venetian Isles, New Orleans, USA, a neighborhood
