= CSX Chef Menteur Pass Bridge =

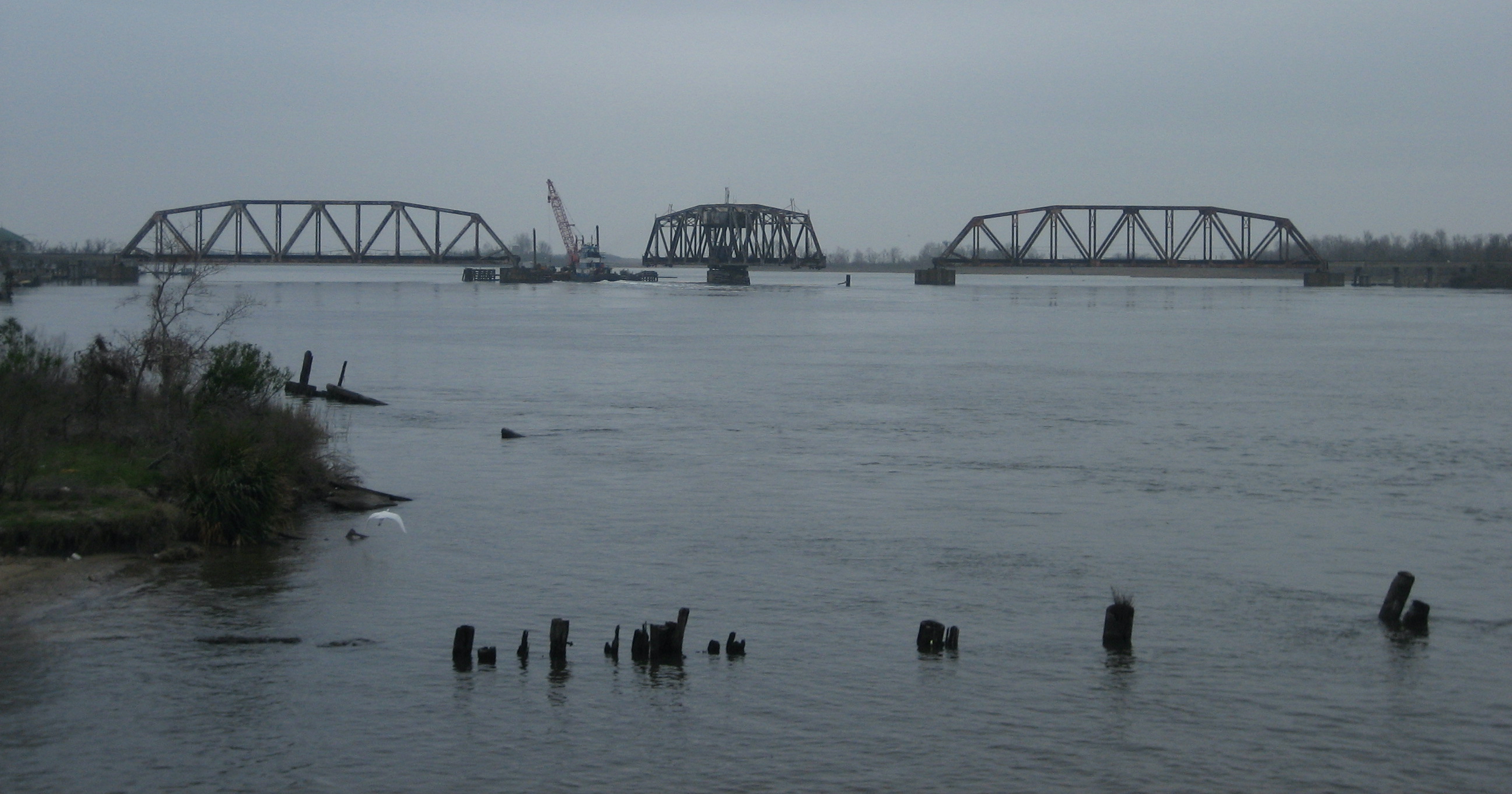
- Coordinates: 30°03′52″N 89°48′02″W
- Carries: 1 track of CSX
- Crosses: Chef Menteur Pass
- Locale: New Orleans and Slidell, Louisiana

Characteristics
- Design: truss bridge with a swing section

The CSX Chef Menteur Pass Bridge carries one track of CSX rail lines across the Chef Menteur Pass on the eastern side of Lake Pontchartrain in New Orleans by the Venetian Isles neighborhood.
