= Philip H. Gilbert =

American politician (1870–1932)

Philip Henri Gilbert

District Attorney of the Louisiana 27th Judicial District
- In office 1908–1916

District Judge of the 27th Judicial District
- In office 1916–1920

District Judge of the 23rd Judicial District
- In office 1928–1932

Louisiana State Senator for Assumption, Lafourche, and Terrebonne parishes
- In office 1924–1930
- Preceded by: Robert B. Butler; Clay J. Dugas
- Succeeded by: Harvey Peltier, Sr.

32nd interim Lieutenant Governor of Louisiana
- In office 1926–1928
- Governor: Oramel H. Simpson
- Preceded by: Oramel H. Simpson
- Succeeded by: Paul N. Cyr

Personal details
- Born: October 25, 1870 Napoleonville, Louisiana, US
- Died: October 18, 1932 (aged 61) Napoleonville, Louisiana
- Party: Democratic
- Spouse: Ella Marie Savoie Gilbert (married 1894-1932, his death)
- Relations: Risley C. "Pappy" Triche, Jr. (grandson); Judge Jane M. Triche-Milazzo (great-granddaughter)
- Children: 8

Philip Henri Gilbert (25 October 1870 – 18 October 1932) was a lawyer and Democratic politician from Napoleonville in Assumption Parish in South Louisiana.

Gilbert was the district attorney of the Louisiana 27th Judicial District from 1908 to 1916 and judge of the same district from 1916 to 1920. As the President of the Louisiana State Senate from 1924 to 1926, Gilbert succeeded to the lieutenant governorship on an interim basis until the expiration of the regular term in 1928.

== Early years ==
Gilbert was instrumental in the construction of St. Anne's Catholic Church in Napoleonville, he was a church trustee and a founding member of his local chapter of the Catholic men's organization, the Knights of Columbus.

Until he was sixteen years old, Gilbert attended the public and private schools of Assumption Parish. In 1905, he began his studies at the Tulane University Law School in New Orleans, from which he obtained a Bachelor of Laws degree.

On January 24, 1894, Gilbert married Ella Marie Savoie. The couple had eight children.

== Political offices ==
Gilbert ran unsuccessfully for lieutenant governor in 1920 against Hewitt Bouanchaud, who was elected along with John M. Parker as governor.

From 1924 to 1930, he was the state senator for Assumption, Lafourche, and Terrebonne parishes in what was then the 12th District. He was the Senate President from 1926 to 1928 and the Senate President Pro Tempore from 1928 to 1930. Gilbert was also the assistant clerk for the 1908 Louisiana Constitutional Convention and a member of the 1921 Louisiana Constitutional Convention. After the death of Governor Henry L. Fuqua in 1926, Lieutenant Governor Oramel H. Simpson succeeded to the governor's office, and Gilbert as president of the state senate became the interim lieutenant governor until his abbreviated term expired in 1928.

On May 16, 1929, as the Senate President Pro Tempore, Gilbert, a loyal supporter of the new governor, Huey Pierce Long, Jr., was the first to sign the round robin to announce that the two-thirds state Senate majority could not be obtained for Long's conviction of the impeachment voted by the Louisiana House of Representatives. Long called his friend "a splendid scholar and parliamentarian. ... The intense hate of my enemies toward me has been a matter of frequent comment. It is more than offset, however, by the loyalty of friends."

In 1928, Gilbert became judge of the Louisiana 23rd Judicial District, a post that he held until his death.

Gilbert was also a delegate to the 1916 Democratic National Convention, which re-nominated U.S. President Woodrow Wilson and Vice President Thomas R. Marshall.

== Business ==
Gilbert was the president of the Lula Company, Inc., which operates the Lula Plantation in Assumption Parish. This firm operated its own sugar refinery. He was president of the Avon Planting Company, Ltd., which operated the Avon Plantation, near Napoleonville.

He served as president of the Bank of Assumption which opened its doors for business in Napoleonville in 1901.

Political offices
Preceded by Oramel H. Simpson	Interim Lieutenant Governor of Louisiana; Philip Henri Gilbert; 1926-1928	Succeeded by Paul N. Cyr
Preceded by Robert B. Butler; Clay J. Dugas	Louisiana State Senator for Assumption, Lafourche, and Terrebonne parishes Philip Henri Gilbert; 1924-1930	Succeeded by Harvey Peltier, Sr.
