= 1924 Louisiana gubernatorial election =

1924 Louisiana Democratic gubernatorial primary
- January 15, 1924 (first round); February 19, 1924 (runoff)
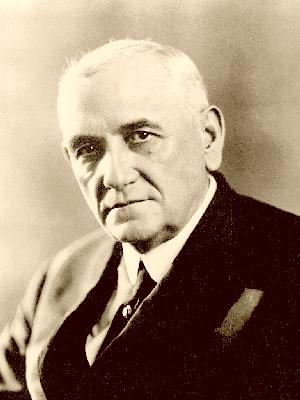

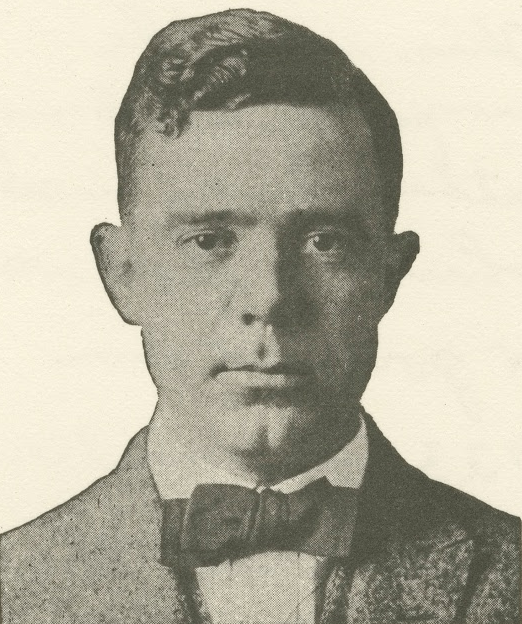
Candidate	Henry L. Fuqua	Hewitt Bouanchaud	Huey P. Long
Party	Democratic	Democratic	Democratic
First round	81,382; 33.98%	84,162; 35.14%	73,985; 30.89%
Runoff	125,880; 57.77%	92,006; 42.23%	Eliminated
- Fuqua: 40–50% 50–60% 60–70% 70–80% 80–90% >90% Bouanchaud 40–50% 50–60% 60–70% 70–80% 80–90% Long 40–50% 50–60% 60–70% 70–80%
Governor before election
John M. Parker
Democratic
Elected Governor
Henry L. Fuqua
Democratic

The 1924 Louisiana gubernatorial election was held in two rounds on January 15 and February 19, 1924. Like most Southern states between the Reconstruction Era and the Civil Rights Movement, Louisiana's Republican Party was virtually nonexistent in terms of electoral support. This meant that the two Democratic Party primaries held on these dates were the real contest over who would be governor. The 1924 election saw Henry L. Fuqua defeat Hewitt Bouanchaud to become Governor of Louisiana, and saw the beginning of the political rise of Huey P. Long Jr., who came in a surprisingly strong third.

== Democratic primary ==
=== Candidates ===
- Hewitt Bouanchaud, Lieutenant Governor of Louisiana
- Henry Fuqua, general manager of the Louisiana State Penitentiary
- Huey Long, Winnfield attorney and Railroad Commissioner

Henry L. Fuqua of Baton Rouge, the manager of Louisiana State Penitentiary, had the support of former governors Jared Y. Sanders and Ruffin G. Pleasant, and of the Regular Democratic Organization, a powerful New Orleans-based political machine. He also received funding from the oil industry.

Hewitt Bouanchaud, a French-speaking lawyer from Pointe Coupee Parish, was the handpicked candidate of outgoing governor John M. Parker.

Huey Long, an ambitious young Railroad Commissioner from Winnfield, had announced his intention to run for governor as early as 1922.

=== Campaign ===
The major emerging issue of the campaign was the Ku Klux Klan, which had surged in popularity across the state in the early 1920s. Long was reluctant to address the issue; his political support was strongest in Protestant north Louisiana, the heartland of the Klan. A strong condemnation of the Klan would alienate many of these supporters. Long ducked this issue, instead arguing that Standard Oil and corporate domination was the true threat to Louisiana. Long was not affiliated with the Klan, but his defensiveness cast doubts among some voters. Fuqua favored an antimasking law to combat the Klan, but did not take a strong stance on the issue. Bouanchaud, a Catholic, made a strong denunciation of the Klan his main campaign issue.

Without the organized support enjoyed by his two opponents, Long built his campaign around printed circulars and frequent campaign stops in rural areas of the state. He campaigned for increased educational funding, road improvement, and the right of unions to organize. He condemned the concentration of wealth and the domination of large corporations over the state, arguing they needed to pay their fair share of taxes. Long's opponents called him a radical demagogue with "Bolshevistic tendencies."

=== Results ===
1924 Democratic gubernatorial primary
Party	Candidate	Votes	%
Democratic	Hewitt Bouanchaud	84,162	35.14%
Democratic	Henry L. Fuqua	81,382	33.98%
Democratic	Huey Long	73,985	30.89%
Total votes		239,529	100.00%

Bouanchaud ran strongest in rural southern Louisiana, where Catholic voters were attracted to his French background and his strong anti-Klan position. Fuqua's strongest vote came from the cities. The real surprise of the election was Long's unexpectedly strong showing; he won all but three parishes in northern and central Louisiana.

=== Runoff results ===
1924 Democratic gubernatorial runoff
Party	Candidate	Votes	%
Democratic	Henry L. Fuqua	125,880	57.77%
Democratic	Hewitt Bouanchaud	92,006	42.23%
Total votes		217,886	100.00%

Even though Long refused to endorse either candidate, most of his supporters went to Fuqua in the runoff.

== General election ==
=== Candidates ===
- Henry L. Fuqua, general manager of the Louisiana State Penitentiary (Democratic)
- James S. Millikin (Republican)

=== Results ===
1924 Louisiana gubernatorial election
Party	Candidate	Votes	%	±%
Democratic	Henry L. Fuqua	66,203	97.90%	▲0.34
Republican	James S. Millikin	1,420	2.10%	▼0.34
Total votes		67,623	100.00%	
