= Fernand Mouton =

American politician

- Born: October 18, 1878; Breaux Bridge, Louisiana
- Died: July 24, 1945
- Occupation: Politician

Fernand Mouton (18 October 1878 – 24 July 1945) was an American politician. Between 1916 and 1920 he served as the 28th lieutenant governor of Louisiana.

== Life ==
Fernand Mouton was born in Breaux Bridge, Louisiana. He was a great-nephew of Alexandre Mouton (1804-1885) a former Governor of Louisiana and United States Senator. He was also related to Charles Homer Mouton who was Lieutenant Governor (LTG) of Louisiana between 1856 and 1859. Another family relationship with Marc M. Mouton, LTG of Louisiana between 1940 and 1944 is possible but cannot be verified in the sources. He graduated from Draughon’s Business College in Nashville, Tennessee. He then worked for two years as a salesman for fruit trees. Afterwards he settled in Lafayette, Louisiana and became engaged in the insurance business. In 1903 he was appointed by the New York Life Insurance Co. to the position of the superintendent of agents at Paris in France. Two years later he returned to Louisiana and became engaged in banking. He also founded several business enterprises. Politically he joined the Democratic Party. He was elected to the city council of Lafayette and since 1912 he was a member of the Louisiana State Senate. Mouton was the President of the Louisiana State Senate between 1916 and 1920.

In 1916 Mouton was elected to the office of the Lieutenant Governor of Louisiana. He served in this position between 1916 and 1920. In this function he was the deputy of Governor Ruffin Pleasant and he presided over the State Senate. After the end of his term he did not hold any other political offices. He died on 24 July 1945.

Political offices
| Preceded by Thomas C. Barret | Lieutenant Governor of Louisiana; 1916-1920 | Succeeded by Hewitt Bouanchaud |
