= Chef Menteur Pass =

Tidal strait in Louisiana, United States

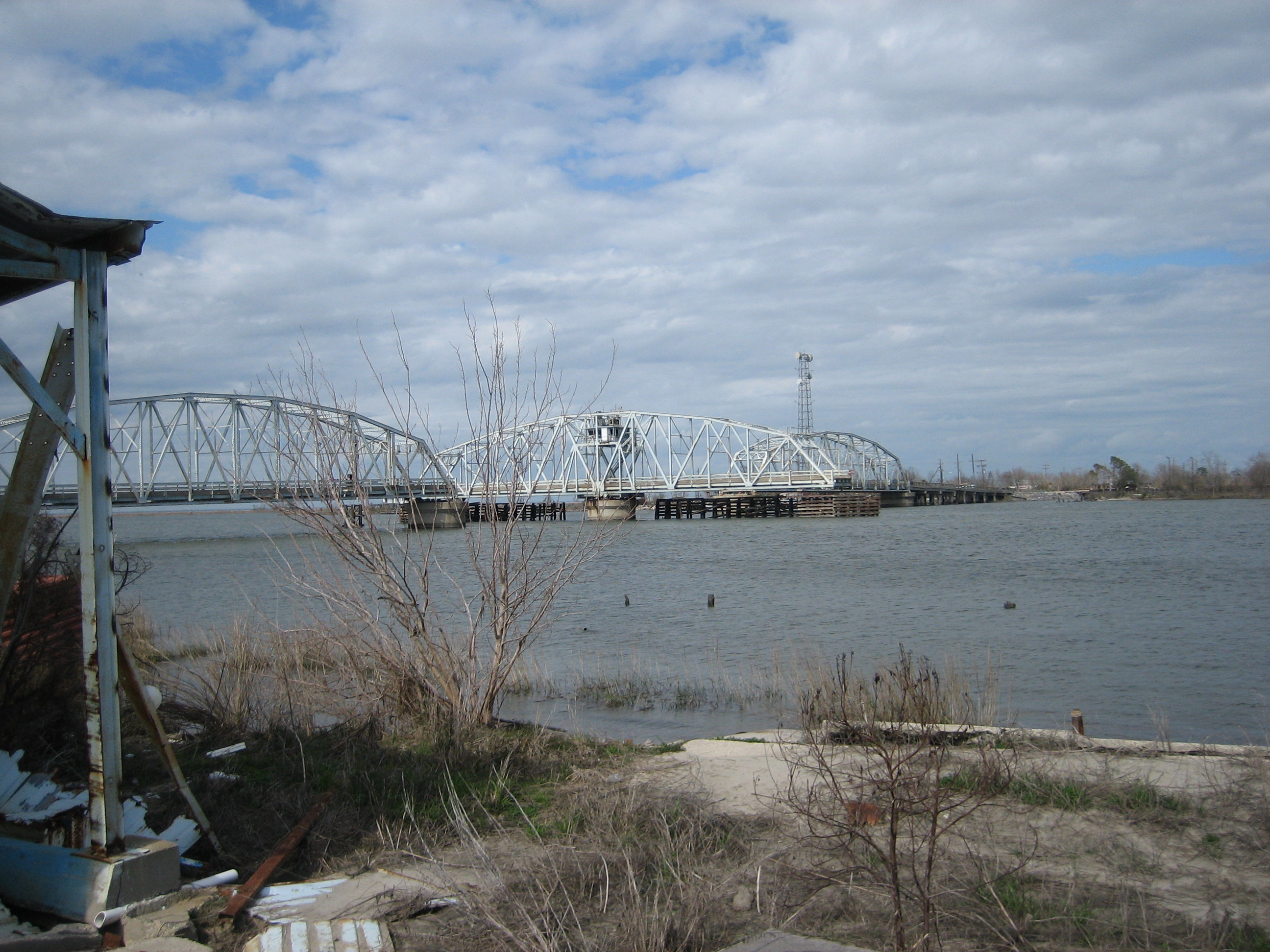
View across Chef Menteur Pass with the Highway 90 Bridge, in 2006, still closed six months after the area was devastated in Hurricane Katrina

The Chef Menteur Pass is a narrow natural waterway which, along with the Rigolets, connects Lake Pontchartrain and Lake Borgne in New Orleans, Louisiana. It begins at 30°5′45″N 89°48′52″W and follows a generally southeastward course. In the days of sailing ships, much commerce from the Gulf of Mexico sailed through the pass and the Rigolets into Lake Pontchartrain to New Orleans and surrounding communities. Larger ships had to use the Rigolets, which had a deeper channel; Chef Menteur was too shallow to fit more than small fishing boats.

The Lake Catherine neighborhood of New Orleans is to the east side of the pass. The Venetian Isles neighborhood of New Orleans is to the west of the pass.

Chef Menteur Pass was long guarded by Fort Macomb, now an abandoned ruin on the western side of the pass. Two bridges span the pass. The Chef Menteur Bridge, constructed in 1929, carries U.S. Highway 90; the portion of this road between central New Orleans and the pass was long known as "Chef Menteur Road" before the route became a U.S. highway. Portions are still known as "Chef Menteur Highway." The CSX railroad bridge also spans Chef Menteur Pass a short distance south of the highway bridge.

This area was hit hard by Hurricane Katrina in 2005, and Hurricane Rita caused further damage, scouring the channel and undermining the bridge's supports. Katrina's peak storm surge within the pass was estimated at 5 metres (16 ft) in a 2008 study. Repairs to the Chef Menteur Bridge were completed in August 2006.

== See also ==
- Chef Menteur
