= Louisiana Highway 72 =

State highway in Louisiana, United States

Louisiana Highway 72

Route information
- Maintained by Louisiana DOTD
- Length: 1.856 mi (2.987 km)
- Existed: 1955 renumbering–present

Major junctions
- West end: LA 3 in Bossier City; I-20 / US 71 in Bossier City
- East end: US 79 / US 80 in Bossier City

Location
- Country: United States
- State: Louisiana
- Parishes: Bossier

Highway system
- Louisiana State Highway System; Interstate; US; State; Scenic
← US 71	→ LA 73

Louisiana Highway 72 (LA 72) is a state highway located in Bossier City, Louisiana. It runs 1.86 miles (2.99 km) in an east–west direction from a junction with LA 3, I-20, and US 71 to a junction with the concurrent U.S. Highways 79 and 80.

The route serves as a commercial thoroughfare in Bossier City, passing through a cluster of shopping centers on Old Minden Road near the junction with LA 3. LA 72 parallels Interstate 20 and provides access to the interstate at several different points along its short route.

== Route description ==
From the west, LA 72 begins at an intersection with LA 3 (Benton Spur Road), directly opposite a ramp leading to an interchange with westbound I-20 and northbound US 71. A short distance later, LA 72 passes directly through a diamond interchange with I-20 at exit 21.

Continuing eastward, LA 72 intersects LA 3105 (Airline Drive) and Northgate Road, leading to the nearby Barksdale Air Force Base. The highway then curves to the north and simultaneously intersects LA 782-2 (Industrial Drive). Shortly afterward, LA 72 crosses the Kansas City Southern Railway (KCS) tracks at grade and passes underneath I-20. LA 72 reaches its eastern terminus immediately afterward at an intersection with the concurrent US 79/US 80 (East Texas Street).

The route is classified as an urban minor arterial by the Louisiana Department of Transportation and Development (La DOTD). Average daily traffic volume in 2013 ranged from 7,900 to 12,300 vehicles. The entire route has a posted speed limit of 35 mph (55 km/h).

== History ==
In the original Louisiana Highway system in use between 1921 and 1955, the modern LA 72 was originally designated as part of State Route 4, which followed the Dixie Overland Highway, an early auto trail, through northern Louisiana. In 1926, it became part of the original route of US 80, which duplicated Route 4 east of Shreveport. The Barksdale Boulevard segment also carried US 71, which shared a bridge across the Red River with US 80. (Now demolished, the Traffic Street Bridge existed at the location of the current I-20 crossing.) When US 80 was re-routed through Bossier City onto Texas Street and the new Long-Allen Bridge in 1934, the former alignment became Route 4-D until the 1955 Louisiana Highway renumbering.

La 72—From a junction with La 3 at or near Bossier City northeasterly to a junction with La-US 80.

— 1955 legislative route description

LA 72 was created with the 1955 renumbering, following only the portion of the current route east of LA 3. When I-20 was opened through the area in 1966, US 71 began to follow the parallel interstate alignment from exit 20B–C westward across the Red River Bridge. LA 72 was then extended to follow the old route along Barksdale Boulevard west to Traffic Street and north onto Traffic Street to US 79/US 80. (The Traffic Street segment had been used as a connector during various times when US 71 was routed over the Long-Allen Bridge; its original state route designation in the 1955 renumbering was LA 782-3.) The Traffic Street connector was returned to local control in the 2000s, followed by the portion of Barksdale Boulevard west of Hamilton Road in 2016. The portion of LA 72 from Hamilton Road to LA 3 was transferred to local control in 2018, giving LA 72 its current western terminus.

== Future ==
La DOTD is currently engaged in a program that aims to transfer about 5,000 miles (8,000 km) of state-owned roadways to local governments over the next several years. Under this plan of "right-sizing" the state highway system, the entirety of LA 72 is proposed for deletion as it no longer meets a significant interurban travel function.

== Major intersections ==
The entire highway is in Bossier City, Bossier Parish.

mi	km	Destinations	Notes
0.000	0.000	I-20 west / US 71 north – Shreveport US 71 south (Barksdale Boulevard) LA 3 north (Benton Spur Road)	Western terminus; Exit 20B on I-20; southern terminus of LA 3
0.288– 0.432	0.463– 0.695	I-20 – Shreveport, Monroe	Exit 21 on I-20
1.142	1.838	LA 3105 (Airline Drive) to I-20	
1.477	2.377	LA 782-2 east (Industrial Drive)	Western terminus of LA 782-2
1.740– 1.856	2.800– 2.987	US 79 / US 80 (East Texas Street)	Eastern terminus
1.000 mi = 1.609 km; 1.000 km = 0.621 mi
