= Oramel Simpson =

Former American politician

Oramel Hinckley Simpson
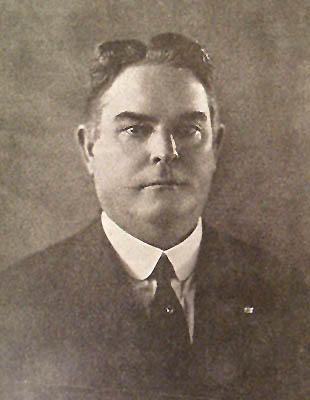

39th Governor of Louisiana
- In office October 11, 1926 – May 21, 1928
- Lieutenant: Philip H. Gilbert
- Preceded by: Henry L. Fuqua
- Succeeded by: Huey Long

31st Lieutenant Governor of Louisiana
- In office May 13, 1924 – October 11, 1926
- Governor: Henry L. Fuqua
- Preceded by: Delos Johnson
- Succeeded by: Philip Gilbert

Personal details
- Born: Oramel Hinckley Simpson; March 20, 1870 Washington, Louisiana, U.S.
- Died: November 17, 1932 (aged 62) New Orleans, Louisiana, U.S.
- Resting place: Greenwood Cemetery
- Party: Democratic
- Spouse: Louise Ernestine Pichet (m. 1899)
- Education: Centenary College of Louisiana; Tulane University

Oramel Hinckley Simpson (March 20, 1870 – November 17, 1932) became the 39th governor of Louisiana upon the death of his predecessor, Henry L. Fuqua.

== Early life and education ==
Simpson was born to Samuel Simpson and Mary Esther (Beer) Simpson in Washington, St. Landry Parish, Louisiana on March 20, 1870 and was educated at Centenary College at Jackson and Tulane University Law School. He married Louise Ernestine Pichet in 1899 and that year began public service as a warrant clerk at the New Orleans Mint.

== Political career ==
Before winning statewide office, Simpson spent more than two decades in the Louisiana Senate’s administrative leadership: assistant secretary (1900–1908) and secretary (1908–1924). He also served as secretary of the 1921 state constitutional convention. He was elected Lieutenant Governor of Louisiana in 1924 and served until he succeeded to the governorship after the death of Henry L. Fuqua on October 11, 1926.

Simpson’s tenure as governor opened amid a dispute over a state franchise to build a toll bridge across the eastern side of Lake Pontchartrain from New Orleans to Slidell—a project backed by then Mayor of New Orleans Martin Behrman. Simpson opposed the toll franchise and promoted a toll-free crossing from Chef Menteur; although the franchise went forward, his administration authorized a free ferry so motorists could avoid the toll.

In this period Louisiana’s anti-masking statute—aimed at Ku Klux Klan activity but with exceptions for events like Mardi Gras—was upheld by the state supreme court in 1925, shortly before Simpson took office.

During the Great Mississippi Flood of 1927, Simpson ordered a downriver breach of the levee to lower pressure on New Orleans. The decision flooded communities below the city; although compensation was promised, contemporary and later accounts described payments as limited and uneven. Simpson also helped organize a tri-state flood-control commission with Mississippi and Arkansas following the disaster to secure federal aid for flood prevention.

== Later life and death ==
Simpson ran in the 1928 Democratic primary for governor but lost to Huey P. Long. He then practiced law in New Orleans and held state posts, including service as a special agent to the Louisiana tax commission and legal representative for the inheritance tax collector. Simpson later became Secretary of the State Senate. Simpson died of a heart seizure in New Orleans on November 17, 1932, and is buried at Greenwood Cemetery.

Party political offices
Preceded by Hewitt Bouanchaud	Democratic nominee for Lieutenant Governor of Louisiana; 1924	Succeeded by Paul N. Cyr
Political offices
Preceded by Delos R. Johnson	Lieutenant Governor of Louisiana; May 13, 1924–October 11, 1926	Succeeded by Philip H. Gilbert
Preceded by Henry L. Fuqua	Governor of Louisiana; October 11, 1926–May 21, 1928	Succeeded by Huey P. Long
