= Fort Macomb =

- U.S. National Register of Historic Places
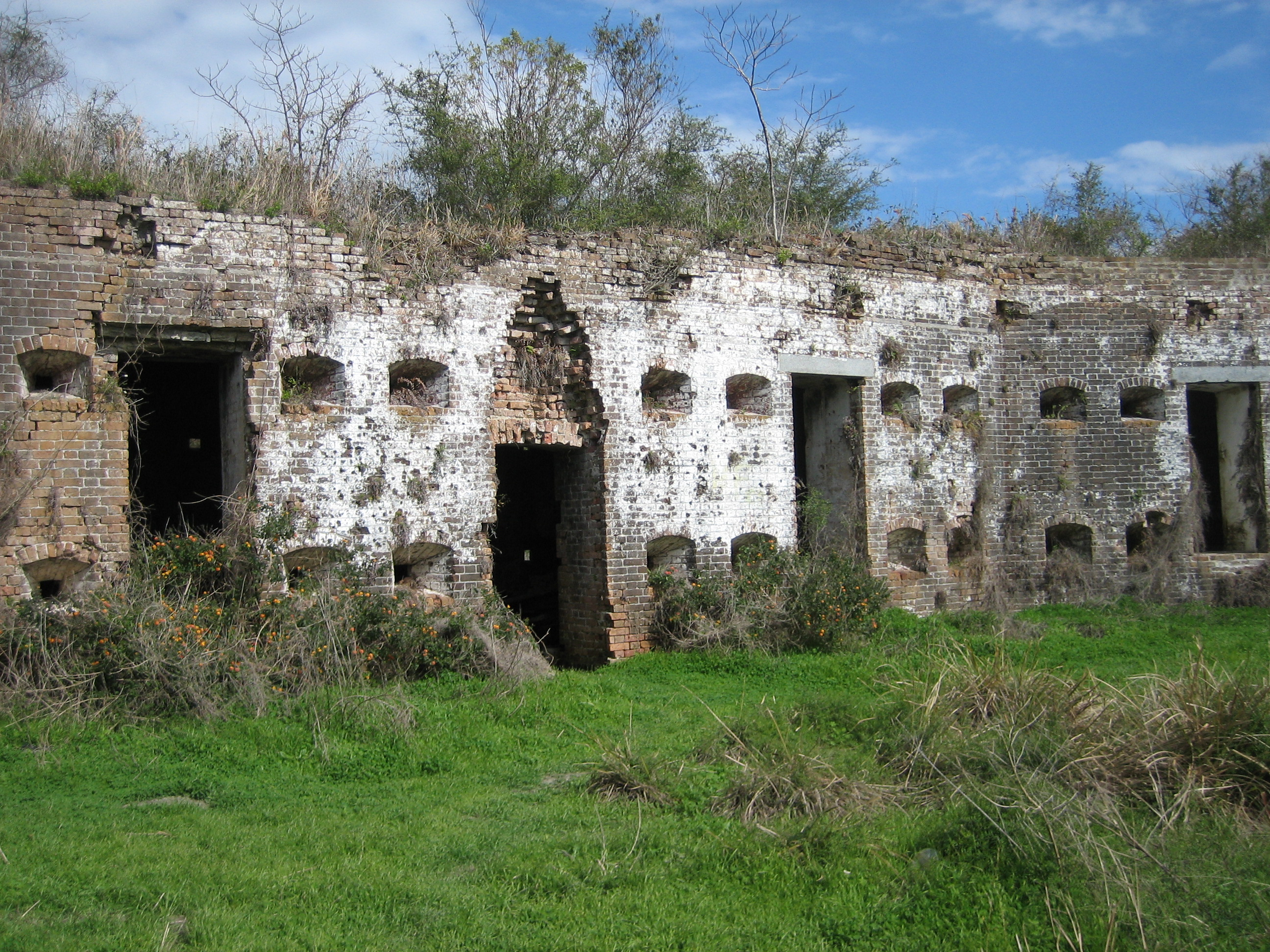
- Ruins of Fort Macomb, February 2006

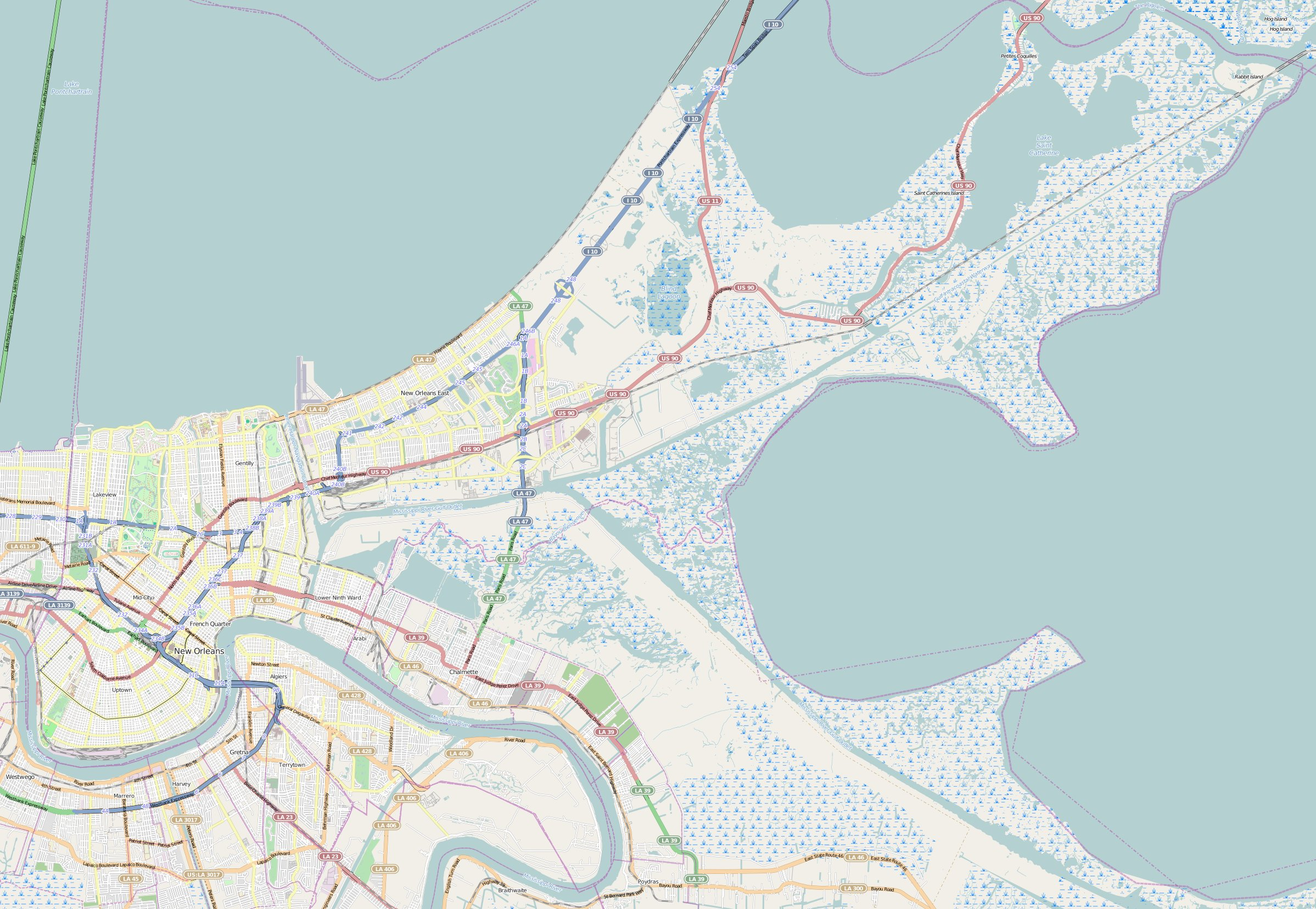
- Location within New Orleans Location within Louisiana Location within the United States
- Location: Orleans Parish, Louisiana
- Nearest city: New Orleans
- Coordinates: 30°3′51″N 89°48′15″W
- Area: 5 acres (2.0 ha)
- Built: 1820
- NRHP reference No.: 78001429
- Added to NRHP: October 11, 1978

Fort Macomb is a 19th-century United States brick fort in Louisiana, on the western shore of Chef Menteur Pass. It is listed on the National Register of Historic Places. The fort is adjacent to the Venetian Isles community, now legally within the city limits of New Orleans, Louisiana. This community was some miles distant from the city when first built and is still distant from the main developed portion of the city.

== History ==
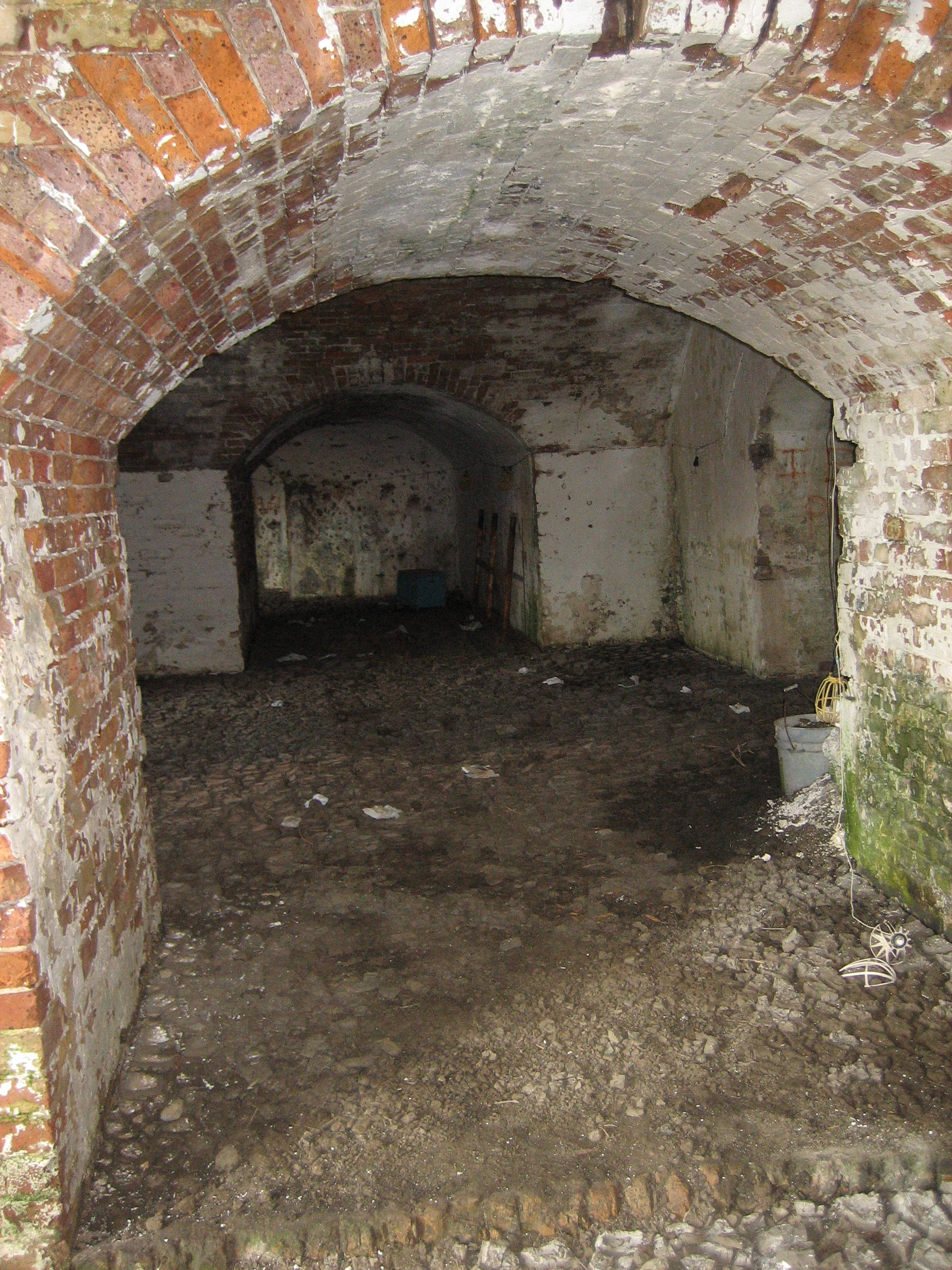
Ruins of Fort Macomb, Louisiana

Chef Menteur Pass is a water route from the Gulf of Mexico to Lake Pontchartrain and the lakeshore of New Orleans. (The other route is the Rigolets; both straits connect Pontchartrain to the Gulf via Lake Borgne.) An earlier fort at the site was called Fort Chef Menteur.

The United States built the current brick fort in 1822, just seven years after British forces invaded the New Orleans area from the sea, at the close of the War of 1812. It was named Fort Wood in 1827 renamed Fort Macomb in 1851, for General Alexander Macomb, former Chief of Engineers and the second Commanding General of the United States Army.

The small fort shaped like a pie wedge has a curved front facing the channel; the curve overlaps the two straight walls, forming demi-bastions. At the salient of the two straight walls is a full bastion facing landward. The fort was surrounded by two wet ditches (moats) with extensive outworks between the ditches. On the parade stands a citadel, a defensive barracks.

A Louisiana garrison took control of and occupied the fort starting on 28 January 1861 early in the American Civil War. In 1862 the Union Army regained control of the fort and also occupied New Orleans.

In 1867 the barracks caught fire, after which the fort was largely abandoned by the U.S. Army. It was decommissioned in 1871.

== Preservation ==
The fort and its land are now owned by the State of Louisiana. While some efforts were made to open it to limited tourism in the late 20th century, the decaying condition of the fort was judged too hazardous for public visits. The similar but better preserved Fort Pike, some 10 miles (16 km) away at the Rigolets, is the regional coastal fort that is open to visitors. (currently closed for budget reasons.)

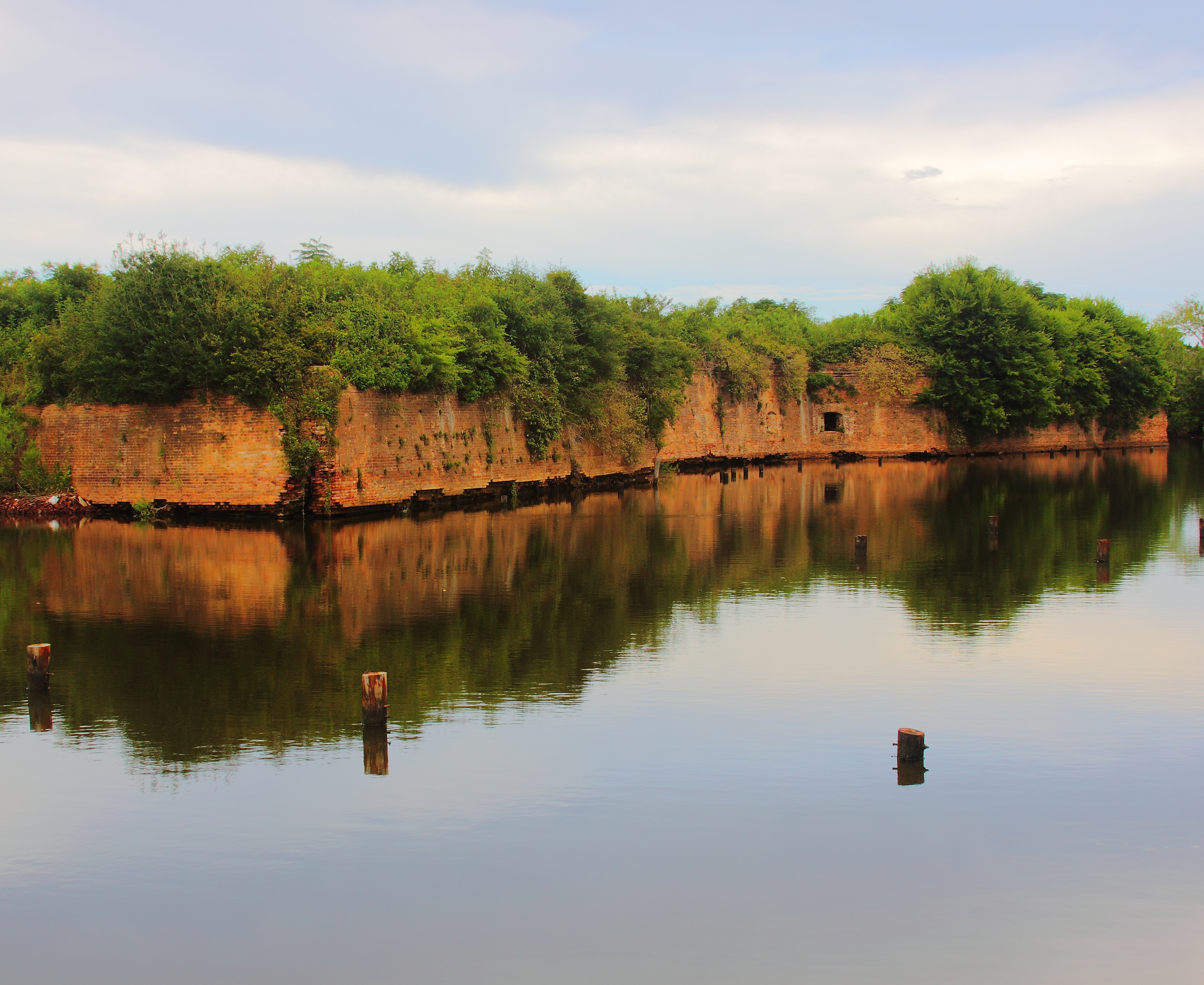
Fort Macomb 2016

A portion of the fort's old moat had been turned into a canal as part of a small marina. The wakes from incoming and outgoing boats were wearing away the outer wall of the fort and accelerating the structural damage. Hurricane Katrina destroyed the marina in 2005. The fort is now protected by riprap. It needs structural stabilization to reverse the previous damage.

In February 2013 a group of 97 students and their chaperones from Oakland County, Michigan helped clear the mud and debris caused by various hurricanes from the inside of the Fort.

== Filming location ==
- The climax of the first-season finale of the 2014 television series True Detective was filmed on location at Fort Macomb.
- This site is also a filming location for the television series Into the Badlands in 2015.
- In 2016, Beyoncé filmed portions of her critically acclaimed visual album, Lemonade, at Fort Macomb.
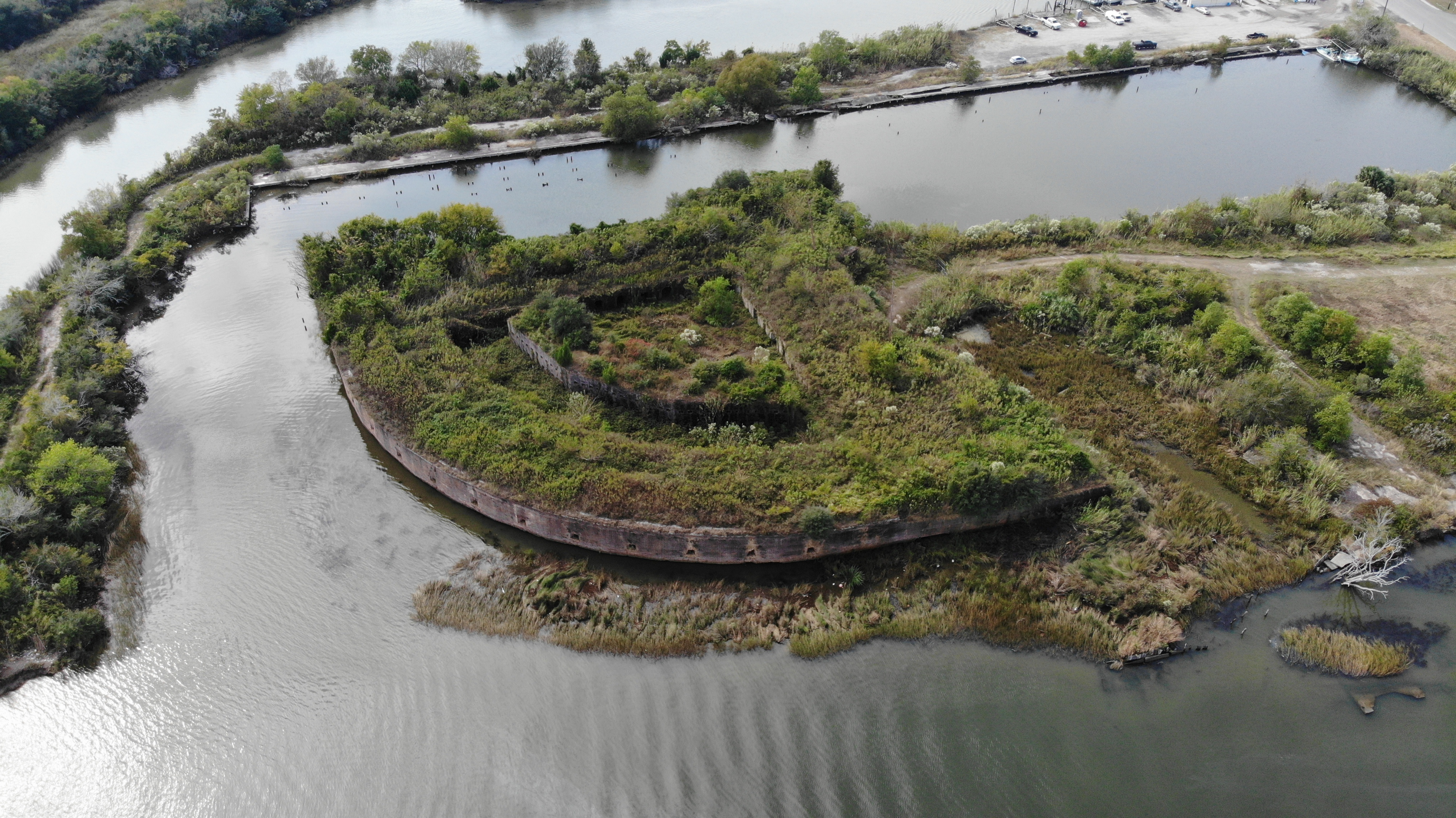
- Aerial photo of Fort Macomb November 2019
  Episode 17 of Season 4 of NCIS: New Orleans used the location for a concluding scene.

== See also ==
- Fort Pike
