= Delos R. Johnson =

American politician from Louisiana (1879–1955)

30th Lieutenant Governor of Louisiana
- In office April 12, 1924 – May 13, 1924
- Governor: John M. Parker
- Preceded by: Hewitt Bouanchaud
- Succeeded by: Oramel H. Simpson

Member of the Louisiana House of Representatives for Washington Parish
- In office 1908–1916

Member of the Louisiana State Senate for the 22nd District
- In office 1916–1932

Personal details
- Born: April 19, 1879 Washington Parish, Louisiana, U.S.
- Died: December 1, 1955 (aged 76) Franklinton, Louisiana, U.S.
- Party: Democratic
- Children: 1
- Education: Tulane Law School

Delos Rozelus Johnson (April 19, 1879 – December 1, 1955) was an American politician who served in the Louisiana House of Representatives and Louisiana State Senate as a member of the Democratic party. He also briefly served as the 30th lieutenant governor of Louisiana in 1924.

== Early life ==
Delos R. Johnson was born on a plantation in Washington Parish, Louisiana, on April 19, 1879, to Andrew Jackson Johnson and Caroline Thomas. He graduated from the Louisiana State Normal College in 1901 and the Tulane Law School in 1906, going on to practice law in Franklinton until 1908. He married Pearl Griffith on March 18, 1913, and had a son.

== Political career ==
Delos R. Johnson was first elected to the Louisiana House of Representatives for Washington Parish unopposed in 1908. He was re-elected in 1912, thereby continuing to serve as a representative until 1916. After his service in the Louisiana House of Representatives, he was elected to the Louisiana State Senate for the 22nd district in 1916. He was re-elected to the State Senate in 1920, and it was during his second term that he became President Pro Tempore of the Senate. Upon his re-election in 1924, Johnson served as the President of the Louisiana State Senate until the resignation of Lieutenant Governor Hewitt Bouanchaud on April 12, 1924. Johnson was sworn in as the acting Lieutenant Governor of Louisiana that same day and held the position until his elected successor took office on May 13, 1924. After his brief service as Lieutenant Governor, Johnson returned to his position as State Senator. He was re-elected to the State Senate for a final time in 1928, serving until 1932. During both his service in the House of representatives as well as in the Senate, Johnson served as chairman of the education committee.

== Later life and death ==
Delos R. Johnson retired from politics upon his term's end in the State Senate in 1932, after which he continued practicing law. He died in Franklinton, Louisiana, on December 1, 1955, and was buried at Ellis Cemetery.

== See also ==
- List of lieutenant governors of Louisiana
- Louisiana House of Representatives
- Louisiana State Senate

Political offices
Preceded by Hewitt Bouanchaud	Lieutenant Governor of Louisiana; 1924	Succeeded by Oramel H. Simpson
