= Handy Brake National Wildlife Refuge =

United States wildlife refuge

- IUCN category IV (habitat/species management area)
- Location within the United States
- Location: Morehouse Parish, Louisiana
- Nearest city: Bastrop, Louisiana
- Coordinates: 32°50′06″N 91°48′06″W
- Area: 501 acres (2.03 km^{2})
- Established: 1988
- Visitors: 4,250 (in 2005)
- Governing body: U.S. Fish and Wildlife Service
- Website: Handy Brake National Wildlife Refuge

Handy Brake National Wildlife Refuge

Handy Brake National Wildlife Refuge is located just north of Bastrop, Louisiana in Morehouse Parish, north central Louisiana. The refuge was established in 1988 with the southeast's first fee title transfer of a Farmer's Home Administration tract (466 acres) to the U.S. Fish and Wildlife Service. A free lease of 38 acres (150,000 m^{2}) from International Paper increased the refuge to the current 501 acres (2.03 km^{2}).

== Wildlife and habitat ==
Handy Brake NWR has a wood duck nest box project. Water levels are manipulated to provide optimal habitat for nesting and wintering ducks. The refuge lands cleared for agriculture prior to the establishment of the refuge have been reforested to bottomland hardwoods.

An observation platform overlooks a permanent wetland, which is excellent habitat for wintering waterfowl, wading birds and many other wetland dependent species. Prairie grasses were established between the water and the observation tower. Periodic mowing or burning of this prairie area prevents woody vegetation from obscuring the view from the platform and provides habitat for grassland birds and other wildlife species.

Handy Brake is managed as a waterfowl sanctuary and access is restricted to the area immediately adjacent to the observation tower.

== See also ==
- List of National Wildlife Refuges: Louisiana
