= Hosston, Louisiana =

- Village
- Village of Hosston
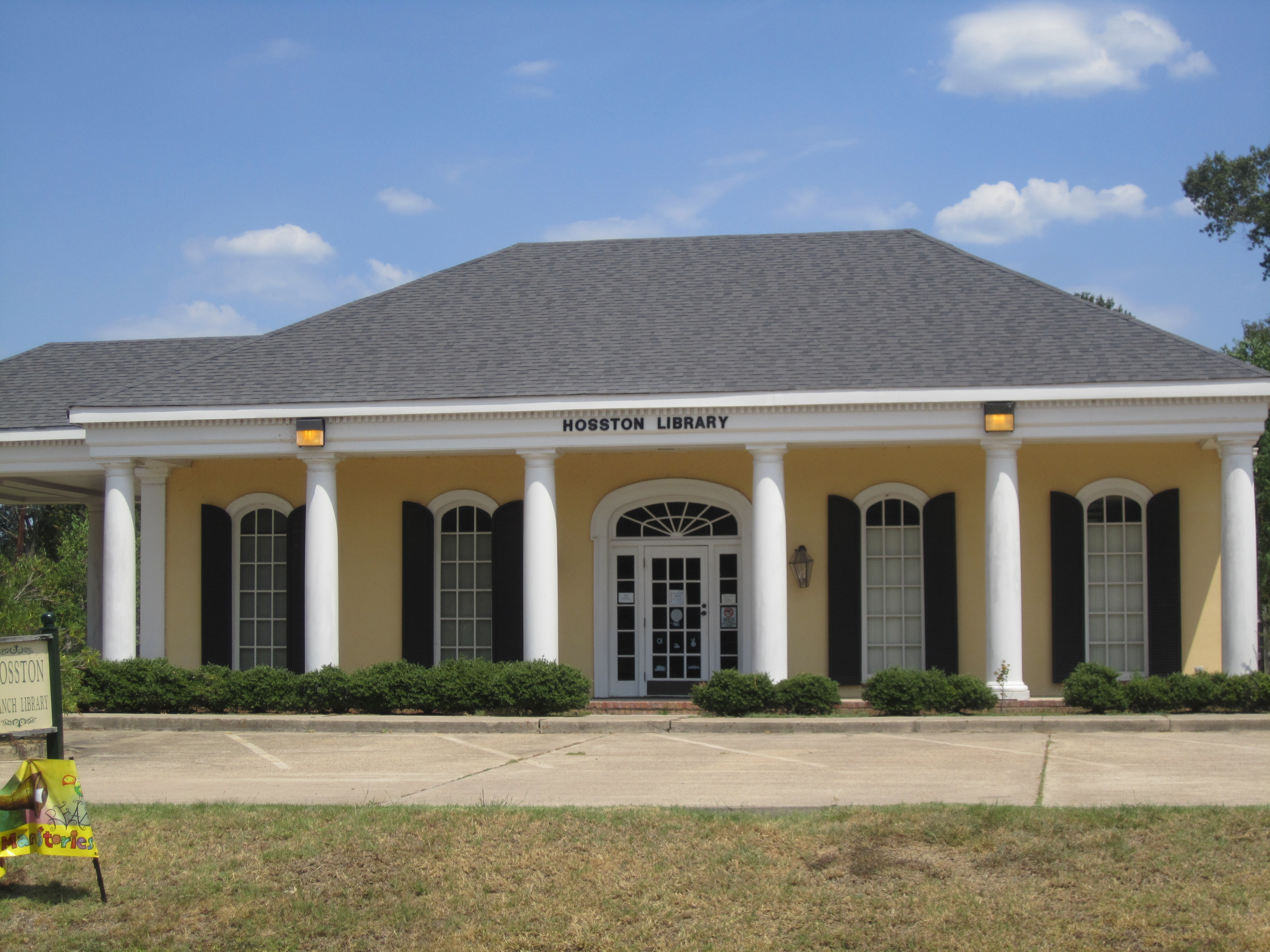
- Hosston branch of Caddo Parish Library

- Location of Hosston in Caddo Parish, Louisiana.

- Location of Louisiana in the United States
- Coordinates: 32°52′42″N 93°52′38″W
- Country: United States
- State: Louisiana
- Parish: Caddo

Area
  - Total: 2.76 sq mi (7.14 km^{2})
  - Land: 2.66 sq mi (6.90 km^{2})
  - Water: 0.097 sq mi (0.25 km^{2})
- Elevation: 197 ft (60 m)

Population (2020)
  - Total: 244
  - Rank: CD: 7th
  - Density: 91.6/sq mi (35.37/km^{2})
- Time zone: UTC-6 (CST)
  - Summer (DST): UTC-5 (CDT)
- Area code: 318
- FIPS code: 22-36150
- GNIS feature ID: 2407478
- Website: villageofhosston.com

Hosston is a village in Caddo Parish, Louisiana, United States. As of the 2020 census, Hosston had a population of 244. It is part of the Shreveport–Bossier City Metropolitan Statistical Area.

== Geography ==
Hosston is located in northern Caddo Parish 3 miles (5 km) west of the Red River and 1 mile (1.6 km) east of Black Bayou Lake. U.S. Route 71 runs through the center of the village, leading south 28 miles (45 km) to Shreveport and north 9 miles (14 km) to the Arkansas line at Ida. Louisiana Highway 2 runs west from Hosston 7 miles (11 km) to Vivian and east 11 miles (18 km) to Plain Dealing.

According to the United States Census Bureau, Hosston has a total area of 2.8 square miles (7.2 km^{2}), of which 2.7 square miles (6.9 km^{2}) is land and 0.1 square miles (0.3 km^{2}), or 3.94%, is water.

=== Climate ===
The climate in this area is characterized by hot, humid summers and generally mild to cool winters. According to the Köppen Climate Classification system, Hosston has a humid subtropical climate, abbreviated "Cfa" on climate maps.

== History ==
Hosston owes its origins to the pioneering efforts of the Hoss family, particularly James M. Hoss Sr., who played a pivotal role in its founding and early development. The town's history is intertwined with the contributions of other notable figures, such as Noah Tyson and George W. Hale, whose endeavors further shaped the growth of Hosston.

The roots of Hosston can be traced back to the mid-1800s when Nathan Hoss, a prominent merchant, established himself in the region during its early settlement phase. His son, James M. Hoss Sr., would later become instrumental in the town's development. Alongside other members of the Hoss family who had migrated from Tennessee and settled in the area, James fostered the growth of the settlement.

During this period, James Hoss garnered renown as a well-known commissioner, collaborating with Noah Tyson, a key figure responsible for the development of much of Rodessa, LA. The two entrepreneurs joined forces and made significant contributions to the expansion and improvement of the region's infrastructure.

Evidence from historical documents suggests that James Hoss and Noah Tyson worked together on several ventures, including a store. A testament to Tyson's influence is the Noah Tyson Park, situated on Mira Myrtis Rd, which stands as a reminder of his legacy.

Despite James Hoss's vital contributions, the northern settlement of Hosston was also significantly influenced by his cousin, George W. Hale. George's efforts in the early 1900s played a crucial role in the continued progress of Hosston. On May 16, 1890, the Hale Post Office was established, with James Hale serving as the Postmaster. He diligently delivered mail to residents living along the Black Bayou Lake, fostering connectivity in the area.

As more people moved to Hosston, the community's infrastructure and skilled workforce continued to grow, further propelling the settlement's development. The population's expansion and increased importance warranted the establishment of a post office, high school, and several other community buildings for Hosston, reflecting the town's ongoing progress and promising future.

Today there are an unknown number of descendants of Nathan K Hoss. However, there are many descendants of Nathan's grandfather, Jacob Hoss of Tennessee, who live around the Hosston area.

== Demographics ==
Historical population
Census	Pop.	Note	%±
1970	428		—
1980	480		12.1%
1990	417		−13.1%
2000	387		−7.2%
2010	318		−17.8%
2020	244		−23.3%
2025 (est.)	235	▼	−3.7%
U.S. Decennial Census

As of the census of 2000, there were 387 people, 152 households, and 101 families residing in the village. The population density was 144.9 inhabitants per square mile (55.9/km^{2}). There were 175 housing units at an average density of 65.5 per square mile (25.3/km^{2}). The racial makeup of the village was 77.00% White, 22.48% African American, 0.26% Asian, and 0.26% from two or more races. Hispanic or Latino of any race were 0.26% of the population.

There were 152 households, out of which 29.6% had children under the age of 18 living with them, 53.3% were married couples living together, 10.5% had a female householder with no husband present, and 32.9% were non-families. 28.3% of all households were made up of individuals, and 15.1% had someone living alone who was 65 years of age or older. The average household size was 2.55 and the average family size was 3.20.

In the village, the population was spread out, with 26.6% under the age of 18, 5.7% from 18 to 24, 26.4% from 25 to 44, 21.4% from 45 to 64, and 19.9% who were 65 years of age or older. The median age was 41 years. For every 100 females, there were 97.4 males. For every 100 females age 18 and over, there were 94.5 males.

The median income for a household in the village was $22,500, and the median income for a family was $26,250. Males had a median income of $25,179 versus $18,125 for females. The per capita income for the village was $12,282. About 24.1% of families and 27.8% of the population were below the poverty line, including 36.7% of those under age 18 and 15.3% of those age 65 or over.

== Education ==
It is in the Caddo Parish School District.

== Gallery ==
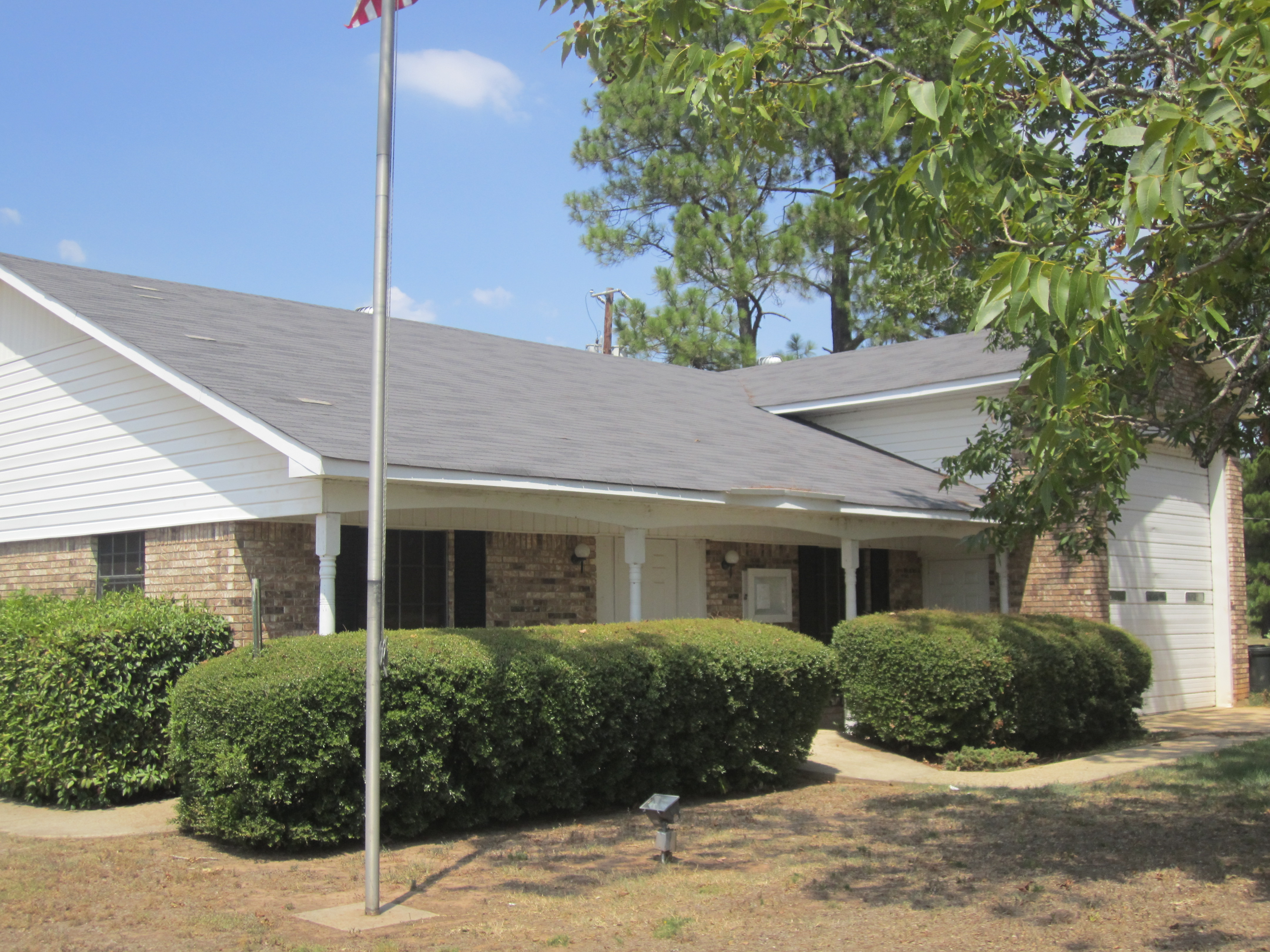
Hosston Village Hall at the intersection of Louisiana State Highway 2 and U.S. Highway 71

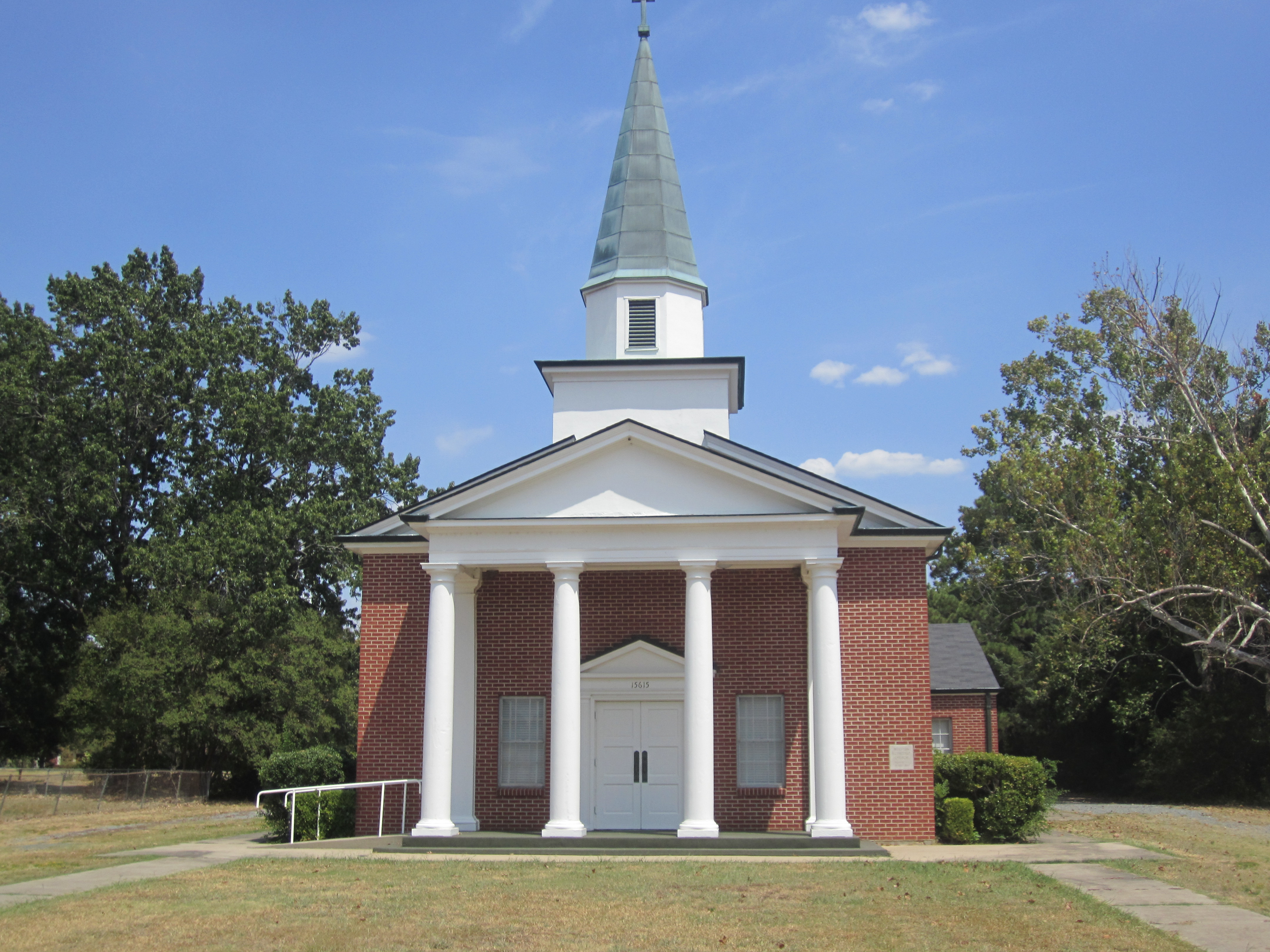
Hosston Methodist Church
