= Chef Menteur =

Topics referred to by the same term

Chef Menteur is associated with several place names in eastern New Orleans and South Louisiana, including Chef Menteur Pass, Bayou Chef Menteur and Chef Menteur Highway (U.S. Highway 90 in Louisiana).

== Etymology ==
Proposed etymologies for the phrase have varied, and the origin was obscure as early as the late nineteenth century. The literal meaning of "Chef Menteur" is "Lying chief" in the French language; most etymologies describe the phrase as originating amongst the Choctaw, in whose language the equivalent is "oulabe mingo." One book from 1891 describes the origin as follows:

What the Choctaws were most conspicuous for was their hatred of falsehood and their love of truth. Tradition relates that one of their chiefs became so addicted to the vice of lying that in disgust they drove him away from their territory. In the now parish of Orleans, back of Gentilly, there is a tract of land in the shape of an isthmus, projecting itself into Lake Pontchartrain, not far from the Rigolets, and terminating in what is called "pointe aux herbes", or Herb Point. It was there that the exiled Choctaw chief retired with his family and a few adherents, near a bayou which discharges itself into the lake. From this circumstance this tract of land received, and still retains the appellation of Chef Menteur, or "Lying Chief".

More modern accounts describe the term as referring either to Kerlerec or the Mississippi River. In the case of the former, the name originates after the French Empire, represented by Kerlerec, reneged on a treaty. In the case of the latter, "lying" is used metaphorically, to describe the twisting and turning of the unregulated and unstable river's path through the delta.
