= Rocky Mount, Louisiana =

- Unincorporated community
- Location within Louisiana Location within the United States
- Coordinates: 32°48′53″N 93°37′46″W
- Country: United States
- State: Louisiana
- Parish: Bossier
- Elevation: 407 ft (124 m)
- Time zone: UTC-6 (Central (CST))
  - Summer (DST): UTC-5 (CDT)
- Area code: 318
- GNIS feature ID: 555822

Rocky Mount (also Rockymount) is an unincorporated community in Bossier Parish, Louisiana, United States.

== Notable people ==
- Jesse C. Deen, Louisiana politician, lived in Rocky Mount; Deen was an agriculture teacher and coach at the Rocky Mount High School in Rocky Mount.
- William Clark Hughes, Louisiana politician, was born in Rocky Mount.
