= Thomas C. Barret =

American politician

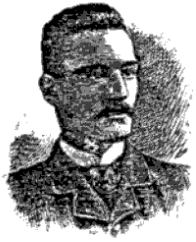

27th Lieutenant Governor of Louisiana
- In office 1912–1916

Member of the Louisiana State Senate
- In office 1896–1912

Personal details
- Born: Thomas Charles Barret; March 30, 1860 Nacogdoches, Texas
- Died: March 17, 1922 (aged 61) Shreveport, Louisiana
- Party: Democratic
- Education: University of the South; Tulane University; Louisiana State University
- Occupation: Lawyer, politician

Thomas Charles Barret (March 30, 1860 – March 17, 1922) was an American politician. Between 1912 and 1916 he served as the 27th lieutenant governor of Louisiana.

== Life ==
Thomas Barret was born in Nacogdoches, Texas. He studied at the University of the South, the Tulane University and the Louisiana State University. In the 1880s he settled in Shreveport, Louisiana where he practiced as a lawyer. In addition he got involved in the real estate business. Politically he joined the Democratic Party. He became a member of the Caddo Parish school board and for a while he served as the treasurer of that Parish. Between 1896 and 1912 Barret held a seat in the Louisiana State Senate, where he became President Pro Tempore in 1908.

In 1912 he was elected to the office of the Lieutenant Governor of Louisiana. He served in this position between 1912 and 1916. In this function he was the deputy of Governor Luther E. Hall and he presided over the State Senate. After the end of his term he did not hold any other political offices. He died at his home in Shreveport on March 17, 1922.

Political offices
Preceded by Paul M. Lambremont	Lieutenant Governor of Louisiana; 1912-1916	Succeeded by Fernand Mouton
