= Alvin Olin King =

American politician (1890–1958)

Alvin King
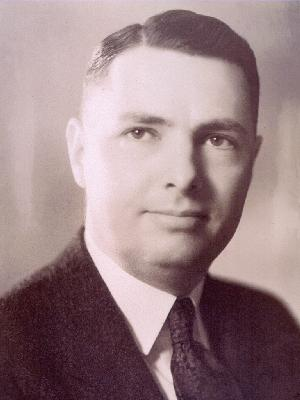

41st Governor of Louisiana
- In office January 25, 1932 – May 10, 1932
- Preceded by: Huey Long
- Succeeded by: Oscar K. Allen

34th Lieutenant Governor of Louisiana
- In office 1931–1932
- Governor: Huey Long
- Preceded by: Paul N. Cyr
- Succeeded by: John B. Fournet

Personal details
- Born: June 21, 1890 Leoti, Kansas, U.S.
- Died: February 21, 1958 (aged 67) Lake Charles, Louisiana, U.S.
- Party: Democratic
- Education: Tulane University (BA, LLB)

Alvin Olin King (June 21, 1890 – February 21, 1958) was an American politician allied with the Democratic faction of Governor Huey Pierce Long Jr. A state senator, he was President Pro Tempore in 1931, after Long had been elected in 1930 as a US Senator.

After Long had conflict with his lieutenant governor, who was ruled to have resigned, King advanced to serve as lieutenant governor for a year. Beginning in late January 1932, he served for three and a half months as governor of Louisiana, after Long had resigned and moved to Washington, D.C.

== Early life and education ==
King was born in Leoti in Wichita County in western Kansas – not to be confused with the city of Wichita in southern Kansas. He attended Tulane University Law School in New Orleans and began the practice of law in Calcasieu Parish, Louisiana.

== Political career ==
King had joined the Democratic Party and was elected to the Louisiana State Senate from Calcasieu Parish in the southwestern part of the state. He rose to President Pro Tempore of that body.

In 1930 Huey Long, then serving as governor, was elected from Louisiana to the United States Senate. In 1931 Dr. Paul Narcisse Cyr of Jeanerette, a physician and lieutenant governor, filed an ouster suit against Long, under "a law prohibiting dual office holding." He also attempted to take the oath of office as governor at the time when Long would normally have been expected to have vacated the position. The two men had been bitter foes since early years in office.

But Long had not resigned from the governorship, as he had some work he wanted to complete before leaving for Washington, D.C., and being sworn in as senator. The State Supreme Court rejected Cyr's suit. Long won a favorable court ruling that Cyr had given up the position of lieutenant governor by his actions.

King, as President Pro Tempore, assumed the office according to the succession plan, to fill out the term. King succeeded Cyr as Lieutenant Governor in 1931. Cyr filed an ouster suit against King, but it was rejected by the State Supreme Court. Cyr ended his political career at that point and returned to his life in Iberia Parish.

After Long finally resigned in January 1932, King assumed the governorship, serving for the three and a half months remaining in 1932 in Long's elected term, from January 25, 1932, to May 10, 1932.

During his brief tenure, King called for a reduction in highway spending, since the Great Depression made it difficult to finance bonds at an acceptable rate. The Huey P. Long Bridge in Jefferson Parish was under construction in this period, and completed under the next elected governor, Oscar K. Allen. Signs above the roadway entrance to the bridge say only that it was built during the administrations of Huey Long and Oscar K. Allen.

== Later years ==
After his several months as governor, King did not run for office again. He returned to practicing law and served for a time as president of the Louisiana Bar Association. He was a Methodist. He died in his home city of Lake Charles.

Political offices
| Preceded by Paul N. Cyr | Lieutenant Governor of Louisiana; 1931–1932 | Succeeded by John B. Fournet |
| Preceded by Huey Pierce Long Jr. | Governor of Louisiana; January 25, 1932 – May 10, 1932 | Succeeded by Oscar K. Allen |
