= John B. Fournet =

American judge (1895–1984)

John Baptiste Fournet

Louisiana State Representative from St. Martin Parish
- In office 1928–1932
- Preceded by: J.H. Heinen
- Succeeded by: John T. Hood

Speaker of the Louisiana House of Representatives
- In office 1928–1932
- Preceded by: William Clark Hughes
- Succeeded by: Allen J. Ellender

35th Lieutenant Governor of Louisiana
- In office 1932–1935
- Governor: Oscar K. Allen
- Preceded by: Alvin O. King
- Succeeded by: Thomas C. Wingate

Associate Justice, Louisiana Supreme Court
- In office 1935–1949
- Preceded by: Winston Overton

Chief Justice, Louisiana Supreme Court
- In office 1949–1970
- Preceded by: Charles A. O’Neill
- Succeeded by: Mitchell J. Rabalais

Personal details
- Born: July 27, 1895 St. Martinville, St. Martin Parish, Louisiana, United States
- Died: June 3, 1984 (aged 88) Jackson, Hinds County, Mississippi
- Resting place: Fournet Cemetery in St. Martinville, Louisiana
- Party: Democratic
- Spouse(s): Rose, Sylvia Ann
- Parent(s): Louis Michel and Marcelite Gauthier Fournet
- Occupation: Attorney, Educator

John Baptiste Fournet (July 27, 1895 – June 3, 1984) was an American attorney and politician who served as Speaker of the Louisiana House of Representatives, lieutenant governor of Louisiana from 1932 to 1935, and a justice of the Louisiana Supreme Court, serving as an associate justice from 1935 to 1949, and as Chief Justice by seniority from 1949 to 1970.

== Early life, education, and career ==
Born in St. Martinville, Fournet attended Louisiana State Normal College, and was a teacher, and even principal at Morganza High School for a period before entering the law school of LSU in 1917. His studies were interrupted by service in World War I, after which he received an LL.B. from Louisiana State University in 1920.

== Political and judicial career ==
A supporter of Huey P. Long, Fournet served in the Louisiana House of Representatives from 1928 to 1932, and as lieutenant governor of Louisiana from 1932 to 1935, when Fournet was elected to the Louisiana Supreme Court. Fournet was walking next to Long when the latter was assassinated later that year.

Fournet became chief justice of Louisiana by seniority in 1949, and remained on the court until 1970, when he reached the maximum age of service of 75.

Party political offices
Preceded by Paul N. Cyr	Democratic nominee for Lieutenant Governor of Louisiana; 1932	Succeeded by Earl Long
Political offices
Preceded by J.H. Heinen	Louisiana State Representative from Jefferson Davis Parish; 1928–1932	Succeeded by John T. Hood
Preceded by William Clark Hughes of Bossier Parish	Louisiana House Speaker; 1928–1932	Succeeded by Allen Joseph Ellender of Terrebonne Parish
Preceded by Alvin O. King	Lieutenant Governor of Louisiana; 1932–1935	Succeeded by Thomas C. Wingate
