= Henry L. Fuqua =

American politician

Henry Luse Fuqua
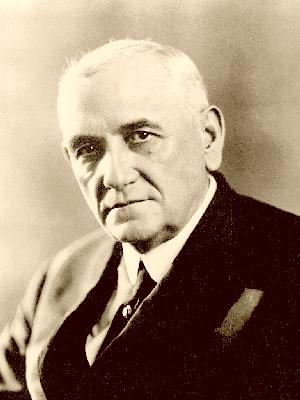

38th Governor of Louisiana
- In office May 13, 1924 – October 11, 1926
- Lieutenant: Oramel H. Simpson
- Preceded by: John M. Parker
- Succeeded by: Oramel H. Simpson

Personal details
- Born: November 8, 1865 Baton Rouge, Louisiana, US
- Died: October 11, 1926 (aged 60) Baton Rouge, Louisiana
- Resting place: Roselawn Memorial Park and Mausoleum
- Party: Democratic
- Spouse: Marie Laure “Laura” Matta (m. 1890–1926, his death)
- Children: 3
- Education: Louisiana State University (attended)
- Occupation: Prison warden Businessman

Henry Luse Fuqua Sr. (November 8, 1865 – October 11, 1926), was an American government official and politician. A Democrat, he is most notable for his service as the 38th governor of Louisiana from 1924 until his death in 1926.

== Biography ==
Henry L. Fuqua was born in Baton Rouge, Louisiana on November 8, 1865, a son of James Overton Fuqua (1822–1875) and Jeannette Maria (Foules) Fuqua (1833–1900). Fuqua's father was an attorney and veteran of the Mexican–American War who served in the Confederate States Army during the American Civil War. His siblings included Stephen O. Fuqua (1874–1943), a career United States Army officer who attained the rank of major general.

Fuqua attended the Collegiate Institute of Baton Rouge, later known as Magruder's Collegiate Institute. He then attended Louisiana State University from 1875 to 1882 as a non-degree student. He completed a special course of instruction in engineering, after which he worked for a year as an assistant engineer on transportation projects in Louisiana and Mississippi, including the Yazoo and Mississippi Valley Railroad.

After returning to Baton Rouge in 1883, Fuqua was a clerk at a hardware store, then became a traveling hardware salesman. In 1892, he organized the Fuqua Hardware Company, which he built into one of the largest tool and hardware retailers in the state. In 1916, Fuqua's business success led to appointment as the general manager of the Louisiana State Penitentiary in Angola. Making use of convict labor, Fuqua expanded the prison's farming operations into sugarcane, rice, and cotton crops that turned a profit for the state.

Though he had not been active in politics, in 1924 was encouraged by supporters to become a candidate for the Democratic nomination for governor. In the primary election, he finished second to Hewitt Bouanchaud, the incumbent lieutenant governor, with Huey Long placing third. In the runoff between Bouanchaud and Fuqua, most Long supporters transferred their support to Fuqua, who easily defeated Bouanchaud. With the Democratic nomination being tantamount to election in the post-Civil War south, Fuqua easily won the general election and took office in May 1924.

Fuqua served as governor from May 13, 1924, until his death. During his brief term, one priority was passage of anti-Ku Klux Klan legislation. He also oversaw enactment of plans to expand public education funding and funding for road construction and improvement. Fuqua died in Baton Rouge on October 11, 1926. He was originally buried at Baton Rouge's Magnolia Cemetery, and later reinterred at Roselawn Memorial Park and Mausoleum in Baton Rouge.

== Family ==
In 1890, Fuqua married Marie Laure "Laura" Matta (1866–1968). They were the parents of three children, Matta, James Overton, and Henry Luse Jr.

Party political offices
Preceded by John M. Parker	Democratic nominee for Governor of Louisiana; 1924	Succeeded by Huey Long
Political offices
Preceded by John M. Parker	Governor of Louisiana; May 13, 1924 – October 11, 1926	Succeeded by Oramel H. Simpson
