= Paul M. Lambremont =

American politician

Paul M. Lambremont (21 July 1864 – 23 May 1930) was an American politician. Between 1908 and 1912 he served as the lieutenant governor of Louisiana.

== Life ==
Paul Lambremont was born in Iberville Parish, Louisiana where he attended the public schools. Later he graduated from Jefferson College. Afterwards he studied law at the Tulane University. After his admission to the bar in 1886 he began to practice as an attorney in St. James. He was also engaged in banking. Politically he joined the Democratic Party. Between 1890 and 1908 he served as secretary of the board of commissioners of the Pontchartrain Levee district and from 1888 through 1892 he was also superintendent of public instruction of St. James Parish. In 1898 he was a delegate to the state constitutional convention and between 1900 and 1908 Lambremont held a seat in the Louisiana State Senate, where he became President Pro Tempore in 1904.He was also a member of the Democratic State Central Committee.

In 1908 he was elected to the office of the Lieutenant Governor of Louisiana. He served in this position between 1908 and 1912. In this function he was the deputy of Governor Jared Y. Sanders Sr. and he presided over the State Senate. After the end of his term Paul Lambremont did not hold any other political offices. He died on 23 May 1930 in New Orleans.

Political offices
Preceded by Jared Y. Sanders Sr.	Lieutenant Governor of Louisiana; 1908-1912	Succeeded by Thomas C. Barret
