= Paul N. Cyr =

American politician (1878–1946)

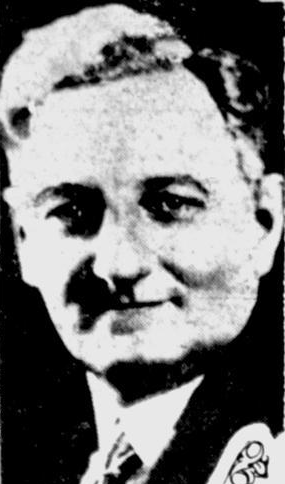

33rd Lieutenant Governor of Louisiana
- In office May 21, 1928 – 1931
- Governor: Huey Long
- Preceded by: Philip H. Gilbert
- Succeeded by: Alvin O. King

Personal details
- Born: Paul Narcisse Cyr; September 9, 1878 Jeanerette, Louisiana
- Died: August 24, 1946 (aged 67)
- Party: Democratic
- Spouse: Florence Mary McGowen
- Children: 4
- Education: Atlanta Dental College; Louisiana State University
- Profession: Dentist; geologist; banker

Paul Narcisse Cyr (September 9, 1878 – August 24, 1946), nicknamed the "Wild Bull of Jeanerette", was an American politician, dentist, banker, and geologist, who served as the lieutenant governor of Louisiana from 1928 to 1931, unsuccessfully declared himself the governor of Louisiana, and was first an ally, then an opponent of Governor Huey Long.

== Career ==
Cyr was a dentist, serving as president of both the Louisiana Dental Society and the Louisiana Dental Examining Board. He also co-founded the First National Bank of Jeanerette, where his daughter Emily later worked, and worked as a geologist for Humble Oil.

=== Politics ===
Cyr was chosen by Huey Long to be his running mate as lieutenant governor when Long ran for Governor of Louisiana in April 1928, partly because Long appreciated Cyr's muscular stature alongside him on the campaign trail and partly to secure the French-speaking vote. They fell out in 1929 after Cyr opposed Long's death sentence on Cyr's friend Thomas Dreher, who with Ada Leboeuf had been convicted of murdering her husband. In March 1930, Cyr spoke out against Long on the state senate floor, accusing him of corruption in naming his brother as a tax collector and in leasing land to a Texan oil company.

Cyr declared himself acting governor whenever Long was out of the state. Long was elected to the United States Senate in 1930, but when Senator Joseph Ransdell's term ended in March 1931, he refused to resign as governor and take up his seat to avoid Cyr being appointed as his successor. Nevertheless, Cyr had himself sworn in as governor by the clerk of Caddo Parish court in Shreveport on 14 October 1931. His term ended almost immediately: Long promptly sent in the National Guard to the Governor's mansion and the state Capitol and drove armed with a pistol from New Orleans to Baton Rouge to oversee the operation. Cyr failed to order Adjutant General Ray Fleming to stand down the National Guard and was threatened with arrest if he entered the state Capitol. Cyr sued, but the suit was dismissed in November and Long had sympathetic judges remove Cyr from both the governorship and as lieutenant governor, arguing that Cyr had vacated the latter post when he swore himself in as governor: "He is no longer Lieutenant Governor, and he is now nothing". Long instead appointed state senate president Alvin O. King as Lieutenant Governor and hence his successor as governor. Another attempt by Cyr to declare himself governor at the Heidelberg Hotel in Baton Rouge in January 1932 also failed when he was evicted at Long's behest, and Cyr backed out of standing for governor in the 1932 election in favor of Dudley LeBlanc, retiring from politics and returning to dentistry.

== Personal life ==
Cyr was born in Jeanerette to a French-speaking Catholic family, the son of Joseph C. Cyr and Emilie Julie Hoffherr. Cyr said he began learning English, aged 10.

Cyr attended Chamberlain Hunt Academy in Mississippi, Louisiana State University, then Atlanta Dental College.

Cyr married Florence Mary McGowen on February 6, 1907 and they had two daughters and two sons, Marjorie Emily (born 1910), Emily Julie (born 1912), later Emily Cyr Bridges and owner of Albania Plantation House, Louie McGowen (born 1913), and Charles McGowen (born 1915). Cyr owned the Steamboat House in New Iberia from 1937.

Party political offices
Preceded by Oramel H. Simpson	Democratic nominee for Lieutenant Governor of Louisiana; 1928	Succeeded by John B. Fournet
Political offices
Preceded by Philip H. Gilbert	Louisiana Lieutenant Governor; 1928–1931	Succeeded by Alvin O. King
