= Harvey Peltier Jr. =

American politician (1923–1980)

Harvey Andrew Peltier Jr.

Louisiana State Senator from Lafourche and Terrebonne parishes
- In office 1964–1976
- Preceded by: A. O. Rappelet
- Succeeded by: Ron J. Landry

President of the University of Louisiana System
- In office 1975 – December 5, 1980
- Preceded by: First in the position
- Succeeded by: William C. Broadhurst

Personal details
- Born: January 18, 1923 Thibodaux, Louisiana, US
- Died: December 5, 1980 (aged 57)
- Party: Democratic
- Spouse: Irma Geheeb "Mickey" Peltier (m. 1945)
- Relations: Harvey Peltier Sr. (father)
- Children: 3

Harvey Andrew Peltier Jr. (January 18, 1923 – December 5, 1980) was from 1964 to 1976 a member of the Louisiana State Senate from District 21, which included Lafourche and Terrebonne parishes in South Louisiana. He served alongside Claude B. Duval, senator from Terrebonne and St. Mary parishes.

Peltier resided in his native Thibodaux, Louisiana. At the age of twenty-five, he was a delegate to the 1948 Democratic National Convention held in Philadelphia, Pennsylvania, which nominated the Truman-Barkley ticket. He was appointed in 1975 by Governor Edwin Edwards as a trustee of the University of Louisiana System and was its first president from 1975 until his death in 1980.

Peltier's father, Harvey Peltier Sr., an attorney, banker, and horse breeder, a political confidante of and a campaign manager for Governor and U.S. Senator Huey Pierce Long Jr. was a member of the Louisiana House of Representatives from 1924 to 1929 and held the same senate seat as his son, from 1930 to 1940. Peltier Sr. also served on the former Louisiana State Board of Education as the elected member from Louisiana's 3rd congressional district.

Peltier's mother was the former May Ayo. He had a sister, Bernice P. Harang, and three brothers, Donald Louis Peltier, Richard Benton Peltier, and Dr. James R. Peltier Sr., a Thibodaux oral surgeon, a founder and president of the Louisiana Society of Oral Surgeons, and member of the "good government" groups the Public Affairs Research Council and the Council for a Better Louisiana. Peltier's brother-in-law, Warren Harang Jr., was a former president of the Thibodaux Chamber of Commerce and the American Sugar Cane League, a member of the Lafourche Parish School Board, and the mayor of Thibodaux from 1968 to 1978, 1986–1990, and 1994–1998.

In 1945, Peltier married Irma Mary Geheeb (1924-2014), the third daughter of Albert John and Cleo Belou Geheeb. Known as "Mickey", she graduated from the former Ursuline College, now Ursuline Academy, in her native New Orleans. The Peltiers lost an infant son in 1952 and have three surviving children, Patricia P. Crum, Harvey "Drew" Peltier III, and wife Linda, and Mary Ellen Peltier. Peltier's son-in-law, John Mitchell Crum (1945-2012), was a district attorney of the 40th Judicial District of St. John the Baptist Parish.

In February 2014, four months before the death of his wife, Peltier Jr. was posthumously inducted into the Louisiana Political Museum and Hall of Fame in Winnfield. Peltier's colleague in the Louisiana House, Richard P. "Dick" Guidry of Lafourche Parish, was inducted in the same ceremony.

Preceded by A. O. Rappelet	Louisiana State Senator from Lafourche and Terrebonne parishes Harvey Andrew Peltier Jr. 1964–1976	Succeeded by Ron J. Landry
Preceded by First in the position	President of the University of Louisiana System; Harvey Andrew Peltier Jr. 1975–1980	Succeeded by William C. Broadhurst
