= James George Palmer =

American politician and lawyer (1875–1952)

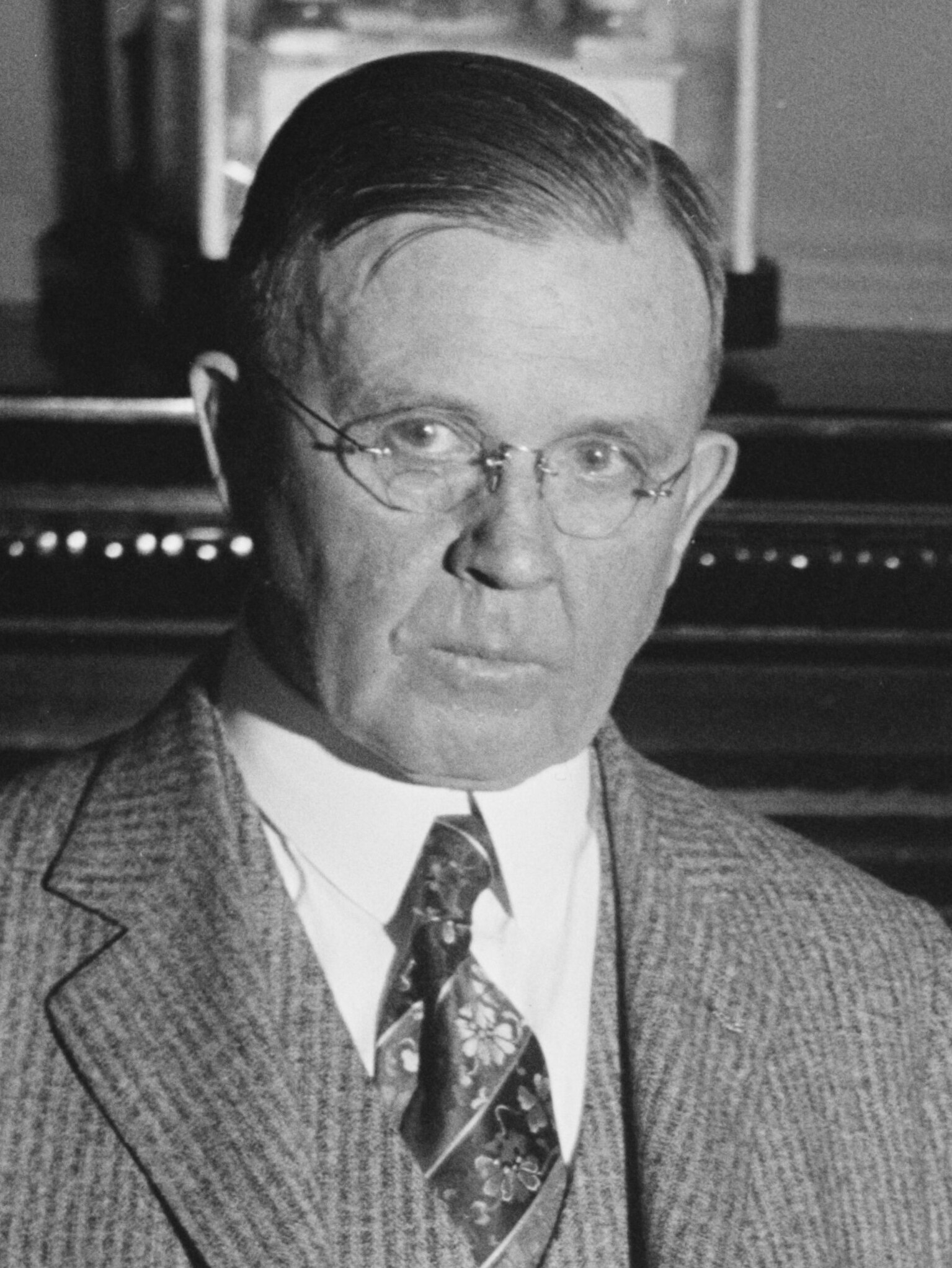
- Palmer in 1930

Mayor of Shreveport, Louisiana
- In office November 10, 1930 – January 23, 1932

Personal details
- Born: Claiborne Parish, Louisiana, U.S.
- Died: January 29, 1952 (aged 76) Shreveport, Louisiana, U.S.
- Resting place: Forest Park Cemetery
- Spouse: Genevieve Stone (m. 1906)
- Children: 4
- Occupation: Politician; lawyer; judge

James George Palmer (November 27, 1875 – January 29, 1952) was an American lawyer, judge, and politician. He served as mayor of Shreveport, Louisiana, from 1930 to 1932.

== Early life ==
James George Palmer was born in Claiborne Parish, Louisiana, to Mary Frances (née Monk) and W. H. Palmer. He was admitted to the bar in March 1901, in New Orleans.

== Career ==
Palmer began practicing law around 1902 in Leesville. In Leesville, he was a member and served as superintendent of education of Vernon Parish School Board. He moved from Leesville to Shreveport in February 1914. In 1921, he was elected to represent Caddo Parish in the Louisiana state constitutional convention.

In 1908, he was elected district attorney of the 12th Judicial District (later the 11th judicial district) and, in 1912, was elected judge of that judicial district. He was mayor of Shreveport from November 10, 1930, to January 23, 1932. He resigned as mayor to accept an interim appointment from Governor Huey P. Long to the Louisiana Circuit Courts of Appeal. He became assistant attorney general under attorney general Bolivar E. Kemp and served in that role until his death.

== Personal life ==
Palmer married Genevieve Stone, daughter of Thomas Marshall Stone, in January 1906. They had a son, James, who died in infancy. Their three surviving children were Albert Stone Palmer, Emily Francis Palmer and Virginia Palmer.

Palmer died on January 29, 1952, aged 76, at his home at 416 Egan Street in Shreveport. He was buried at Forest Park Cemetery.
