= Harvey Peltier Sr. =

American politician (1899–1977)

Harvey Andrew Peltier Sr.
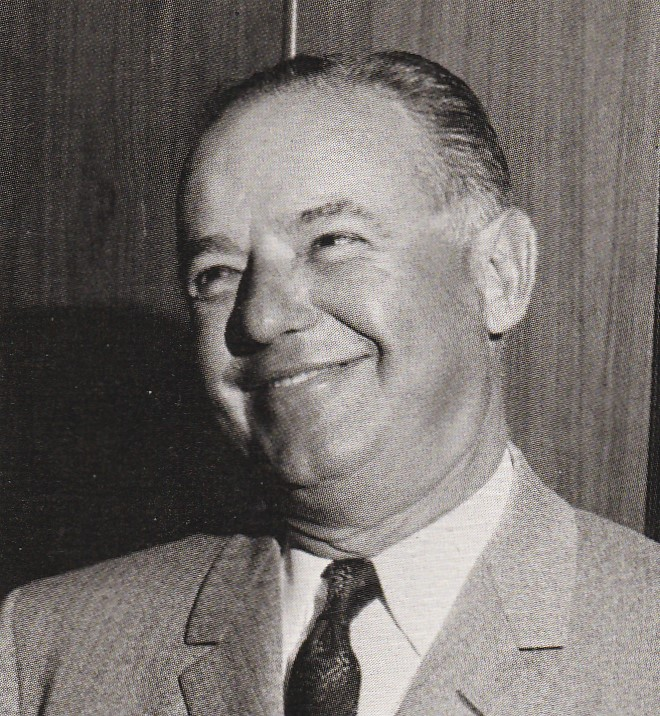

Louisiana State Senator for Lafourche and Terrebonne parishes
- In office 1930–1940
- Preceded by: Philip H. Gilbert
- Succeeded by: Walter Lanier

Louisiana State Representative for Lafourche Parish
- In office 1924–1929
- Preceded by: Two-member district: J. L. Drexler J. W. McClelland
- Succeeded by: Marc J. Picciola

Personal details
- Born: October 20, 1899 Thibodaux, Louisiana, US
- Died: November 12, 1977 (aged 78)
- Party: Democratic
- Spouse: May Ayo Peltier
- Children: 5, including Harvey Peltier, Jr.
- Occupation: Attorney; Banker; Businessman; Horse breeder

Harvey Andrew Peltier Sr. (October 20, 1899 – November 12, 1977), was an attorney, banker, businessman, sugar grower, oilman, champion horse breeder, and politician from Thibodaux, Louisiana, who was a campaign manager of Governor and U.S. Senator Huey Pierce Long, Jr.

== Political life ==
From 1924 to 1929, Peltier was a Democratic member of the Louisiana House of Representatives from his native Lafourche Parish. He was a state senator from Lafourche and Terrebonne parishes from 1930 to 1940.

During the 1960s, Peltier served on the since disbanded Louisiana State Board of Education as the elected member designated for Louisiana's 3rd congressional district. In the general election held on November 8, 1966, Peltier defeated for the state board a Republican candidate, businessman Charles deGravelles, a native of Morgan City residing in Lafayette who subsequently served from 1968 to 1972 as the state GOP party chairman. Peltier polled 44,413 votes (64.7 percent) to deGravelles' 24,236 votes (35.3 percent). In that same election Hall Lyons, a Lafayette oilman and the younger son of Louisiana Republican state chairman Charlton Lyons, failed to unseat veteran U.S. Representative Edwin E. Willis for the Third District House seat. Bill Dodd was then the education superintendent, a position now appointed by the governor, and the then 11-member state board was all-Democratic.

In September 1966, while running for the state education board, Peltier told an interviewer:

I'm 66 years young, and I guess I'm sort of a jack-of-all-trades. I mean I go to my office every day. I have a lot of things going for me. I may have less money than some people, but I have more nerve than most.

== Family background ==
The eighth of nine children, Peltier was the son of a Cajun Roman Catholic couple, Ozeme Euzelien Peltier and the former Heloise Odelia Cancienne. His mother died before his tenth birthday. Ozeme Peltier then married the former Celeste Marie Lenain, who had previously been married to Louis Oleus Gaubert.

Peltier and his wife, the former May Ayo, had four children. Harvey Peltier Jr., like his father, served in the Louisiana State Senate from the Lafourche/Terrebonne constituency. His tenure was from 1964 to 1976. From 1975 to 1980, Peltier Jr., was the first president of the trustees of the University of Louisiana System, a successor education board of the one on which his father had served. The other Peltier children include Bernice P. Harang, James R. Peltier Sr. (1930-May 22, 2020), a Thibodaux oral surgeon, a founder and president of the Louisiana Society of Oral Surgeons, and member of the "good government" groups the Public Affairs Research Council and the Council for a Better Louisiana, Donald Louis Peltier (1926-2008), and Richard Benton Peltier (1938-2007). Peltier's son-in-law, Warren Harang, Jr. (1921-2005), was a former president of the Thibodaux Chamber of Commerce and the American Sugar Cane League, a member of the Lafourche Parish School Board, and the mayor of Thibodaux from 1968-1978, 1986-1990, and 1994-1998.

Peltier died in 1977 at the age of seventy-eight.

For his contribution to Thoroughbred racing, in 1994 Harvey Peltier was inducted into the Fair Grounds Racing Hall of Fame.

| Preceded by Philip H. Gilbert | Louisiana State Senator from Lafourche and Terrebonne parishes Harvey Andrew Peltier Sr. 1930–1940 | Succeeded by Walter Lanier |
| Preceded by Two-member district: J. L. Drexler J. W. McClelland | Louisiana State Representative from Lafourche Parish; Harvey Andrew Peltier Sr. 1924–1925 | Succeeded by Marc J. Picciola |
