= Venetian Isles, New Orleans =

Venetian Isles French: Îles Vénetiennes
- Neighborhood of New Orleans
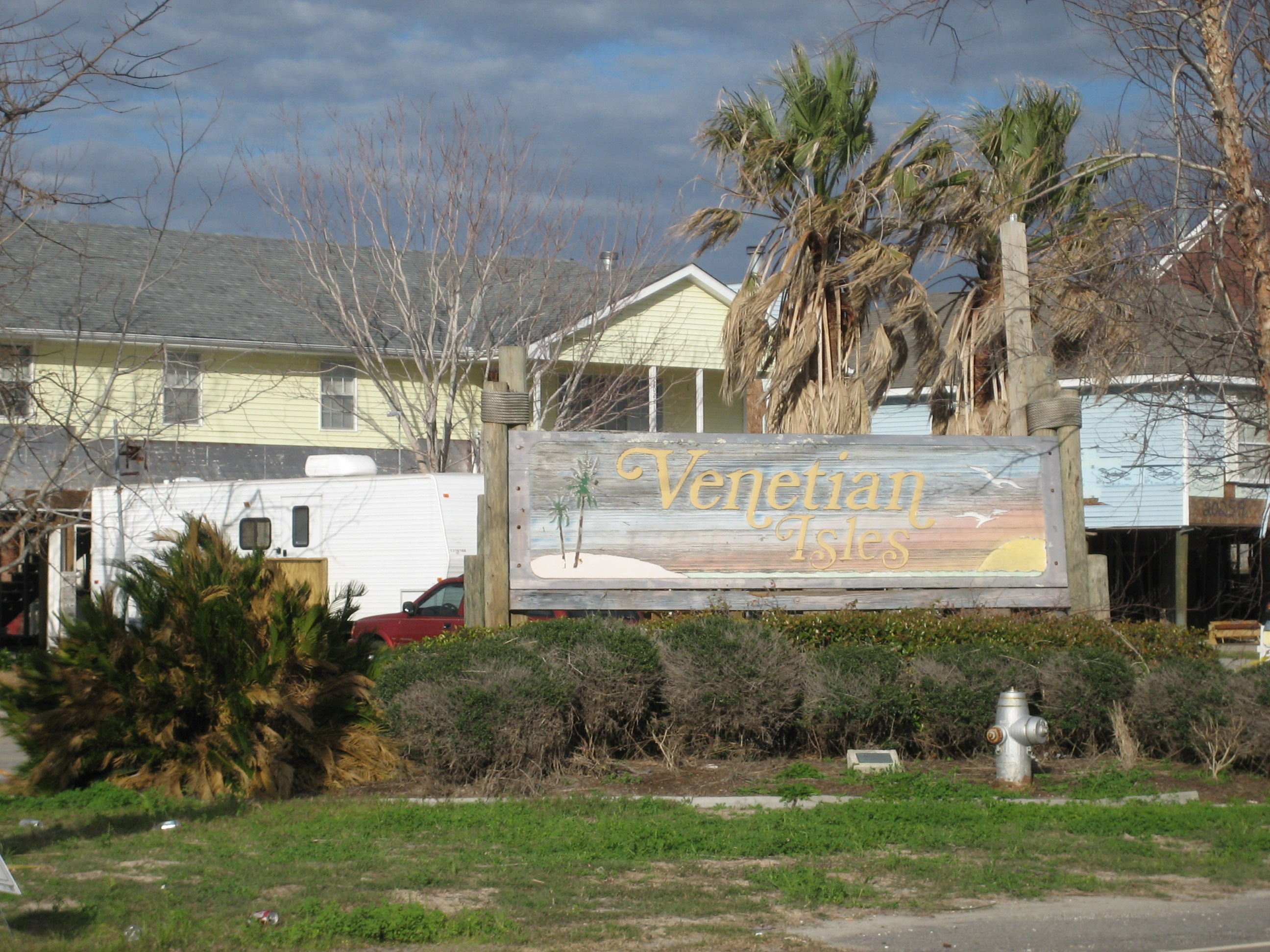
- Venetian Isles sign on Highway 90
- Interactive map of Venetian Isles
- Coordinates: 30.0671°N 89.8128°W
- City: New Orleans
- State: Louisiana
- Country: United States

Venetian Isles (French: Îles Vénetiennes) is a neighborhood of New Orleans, Louisiana. It is located on the western shore of the Chef Menteur Pass, a short waterway on the southeastern edge of Lake Pontchartrain, and on the northern side of U.S. Highway 90.

Legally a part of the city, Venetian Isles is separated from the bulk of the developed portion of New Orleans by miles of undeveloped land. It long had the appearance of a small fishing town. In the late 20th century it saw development as a suburban style bedroom community. The ruins of the abandoned 19th-century Fort Macomb are just south of Venetian Isles, along Chef Menteur Pass.

Venetian Isles was hit hard by storm surge during Hurricane Katrina in 2005. As it lies outside of the City's levee system, it experienced damage similar to that seen in Pearlington, Mississippi and Pass Christian. The neighborhood is flood-prone, with flooding occurring both during hurricanes and strong thunderstorms.

Former 2nd District Congressman Joseph Cao lives in Venetian Isles.
