= Hewitt Bouanchaud =

American politician (1877–1950)

Hewitt Leonidas Bouanchaud

29th Lieutenant Governor of Louisiana
- In office May 11, 1920 – April 12, 1924
- Governor: John M. Parker
- Preceded by: Fernand Mouton
- Succeeded by: Delos R. Johnson

Louisiana State Representative for Pointe Coupee Parish
- In office 1904–1908
- Preceded by: William C. Carruth; M. T. Hewes
- Succeeded by: Ferdinand C. Claiborne; P. O. LeBeau
- In office 1912–1920
- Preceded by: Ferdinand C. Claiborne; P. O. LeBeau
- Succeeded by: Ferdinand C. Claiborne; Simeon Parent

Speaker of the Louisiana House of Representatives
- In office 1916–1920
- Preceded by: Lee Emmett Thomas
- Succeeded by: Richard Flournoy Walker

Personal details
- Born: August 19, 1877 Pointe Coupee Parish; Louisiana, USA
- Died: October 17, 1950 (aged 73)
- Party: Democratic
- Relations: J. Marshall Brown (great-niece's husband)

Hewitt Leonidas Bouanchaud (August 19, 1877 – October 17, 1950) was a Democratic politician in the U.S. state of Louisiana. A native of Pointe Coupee Parish, Bouanchaud was elected a member of the Louisiana House of Representatives in 1904. After an absence of one term, he was elected again in 1912 and 1916. In 1916, he was named Speaker of the Louisiana House. In 1920, he was elected lieutenant governor as the running mate to gubernatorial candidate John M. Parker, a Democrat formerly affiliated with the Progressive Party. Among Bouanchaud's opponents was state court Judge Philip H. Gilbert of Assumption Parish, who was subsequently the interim lieutenant governor from 1926 to 1928.

As the former House Speaker, Bouanchaud was chosen president of the Louisiana Constitutional Convention in 1921. The document produced by that convention remained in force until 1975 during the administration of Governor Edwin Edwards.

In 1924, Lieutenant Governor Bouanchaud ran for governor against Henry L. Fuqua, and Huey Pierce Long, Jr. Bouanchaud and Fuqua received the most votes in the first Democratic primary held on January 15, 1924, with Long of Winnfield, having been eliminated from contention that year. Long then gained the governorship four years later in 1928. Fuqua defeated Bouanchaud in the second Democratic primary held on February 19, 1924.

Bouanchaud was the brother of longtime Pointe Coupee Parish Sheriff Lamartine Bouanchaud. His great-niece, Mary Blanche Crosby Brown (1923-2013), was the wife of J. Marshall Brown, a member of the Louisiana House of Representatives from Orleans Parish and a leading figure in the Louisiana Democratic Party. The Bouanchauds were sons of James Alcide Bouanchaud, a captain of the Pointe Coupee Battery for the Confederate States of America during the American Civil War. Alcide Bouanchaud later became a state district court judge. Hewitt Bouanchaud's nephew, Alcide "Bub" Bouanchaud, and his great-great nephew. Paul Raymond Smith, both served as sheriff in Pointe Coupee Parish.

Bouanchaud was preceded as Speaker by Lee Emmett Thomas of Shreveport.

== Sources ==
- Curet, Bernard. "Ponte Coupee: Her Place in History." Acadiana Profile magazine, September 1969: 9.

Political offices
Preceded by William C. Carruth; M. T. Hewes	Louisiana State Representative for Pointe Coupee Parish; Hewitt Leonidas Bouanchaud; 1904–1908	Succeeded by Ferdinand C. Claiborne; P. O. LeBeau
Preceded by Ferdinand C. Claiborne; P. O. LeBeau	Louisiana State Representative for Pointe Coupee Parish; Hewitt Leonidas Bouanchaud; 1912–1920	Succeeded by Ferdinand C. Claiborne; Simeon Parent
Preceded by Lee Emmett Thomas of Caddo Parish	Speaker of the Louisiana House of Representatives from Pointe Coupee; Hewitt Leonidas Bouanchaud; 1916–1920	Succeeded by Richard Flournoy Walker of East Feliciana Parish
Preceded by Fernand Mouton	Lieutenant Governor of Louisiana; Hewitt Leonidas Bouanchaud; 1920–1924	Succeeded by Delos R. Johnson
