= Joseph Barton Elam =

American politician (1821–1885)

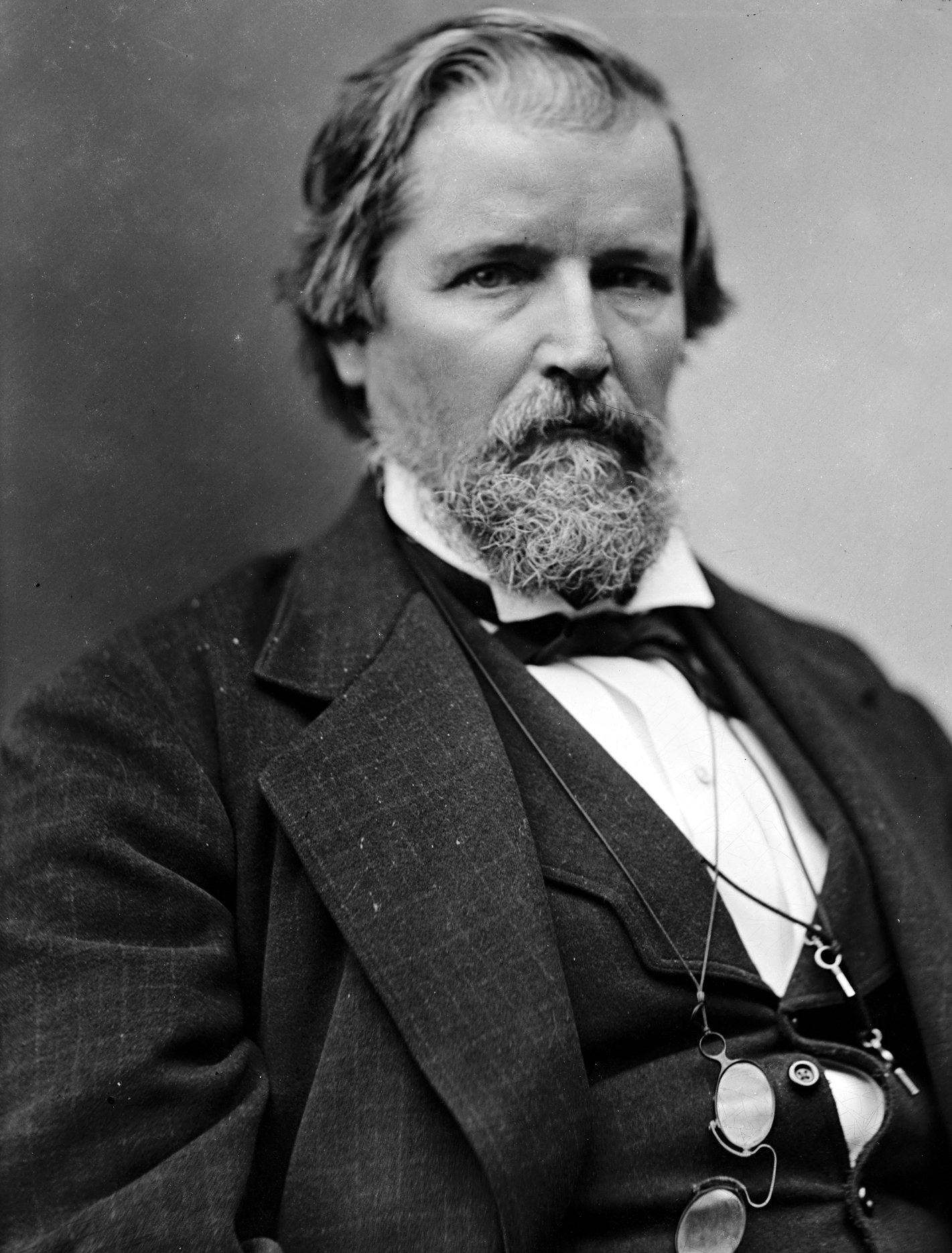

Member of the U.S. House of Representatives from Louisiana's 4th district
- In office March 4, 1877 – March 3, 1881
- Preceded by: William Mallory Levy
- Succeeded by: Newton C. Blanchard

Speaker of the Louisiana House of Representatives (Confederate States of America)
- In office 1862–1864
- President: Jefferson Davis, CSA
- Preceded by: None
- Succeeded by: B. F. Chapman

Personal details
- Born: 12 June 1821 Hope, Hempstead County; Arkansas Territory, USA
- Died: July 4, 1885 (aged 64) Mansfield, DeSoto Parish; Louisiana
- Party: Democratic
- Spouse(s): Twice widowed Third wife: Harriet Spencer Elam
- Relations: William B. Spencer (brother-in-law) Harmon Drew, Jr. (great-grandson) Many, Louisiana Mansfield, Louisiana
- Children: Charles Wheaton Elam (1866-1917) Joseph Barton Elam, Jr. (1878-1935); Mollie (b. 1857); Ida (b. 1861); William J. (b. 1863); Irene (b. 1868); Susan (b. 1871) Katie (b. 1874)
- Education: Private study of law
- Profession: Lawyer

Joseph Barton Elam, Sr. (June 12, 1821 – July 4, 1885), was a two-term Democratic U.S. representative for Louisiana's 4th congressional district, whose service corresponded with the administration of U.S. President Rutherford B. Hayes.

== Early life and education ==
Elam was born near Hope in Hempstead County in southwestern Arkansas Territory, to William Jefferson Elam, a teacher, and his wife, the former Cynthia Wheaton, both from Virginia. The Elam family moved in 1823 to Ayish Bayou near San Augustine in East Texas, where another son, Charles Wheaton Elam, was born. In 1826, the Elams relocated to Natchitoches, Louisiana, where Mary Jane Elam was born. By 1833, the family had moved to Fort Jessup, Louisiana, the westernmost outpost of the United States at that time. William Elam tutored the officers' sons. Another son, John Waddill Elam, was born at Fort Jessup in 1833. There was also a daughter, Henrietta Elam.

The Elam children were educated at Fort Jessup. Later, Joseph Elam read law with his cousin John Waddill in Alexandria, Louisiana. In 1853, Waddill helped obtain the freedom of Solomon Northup, a kidnapped man from New York and the subject of the film Twelve Years a Slave, who had been sold into slavery in Louisiana. Northup had been held as a slave for twelve years in the Red River region. Under its 1841 law, the state of New York commissioned an attorney to help find and free the kidnapped man.

Elam was admitted to the bar in October 1843 and began his practice in Alexandria. He moved in 1844 to Sabine Parish and settled in the parish seat of Many.

== Political career ==
Elam helped to establish the court system in DeSoto Parish, where on August 7, 1843, he made his first court appearance as an attorney. In 1845, Elam was elected to the Sabine Parish Police Jury, the parish governing body. He was the jury president from 1846 to 1847. Elam also served as the district attorney of Sabine Parish. In 1847, Elam drafted the articles for incorporation for the town of Mansfield, and was elected as its first mayor. He served as mayor a second time in 1856. He was also a Mansfield alderman.

Elam was elected to the Louisiana House of Representatives from DeSoto Parish. He served as the House Speaker from 1862 to 1864. His brother, John Waddill Elam, was elected sheriff of DeSoto Parish.

In 1861, Elam was elected a delegate to the Confederate Constitutional Convention and signed the Louisiana Ordinance of Secession on January 26, 1861.

In November 1865, he was elected as a state representative in the post-civil war Reconstruction legislature; this tenure is not reflected in the website, "Membership of the Louisiana House of Representatives, 1812-2016." Elam served in the state legislature until the passage in 1867 by Congress of the Reconstruction Acts. Elam attended the National Union Convention as a delegate from Louisiana in 1866.

During Reconstruction, the Radical Republicans took control of Louisiana, and Elam was temporarily disfranchised under the Louisiana Constitution of 1868, which prevented former officers of the Confederacy from running for office for a limited period. When in 1870, section 99 of this Constitution was repealed, Elam was allowed again to seek office.

Because of violence and intimidation associated with elections, conducted in part by the Ku Klux Klan trying to suppress black and other Republican voting, the Radicals passed legislation in 1870 to establish "returning boards," which were authorized to review elections and dismiss results from ones in which fraud was committed. That year, the U. S. Congress passed the Force Act, intended to aid in suppressing the power of the KKK in the South.

Elam was denied office in 1870, 1872 and 1874 by the returning boards. In 1870, Elam stopped a riot by speaking to and calming a crowd after an election was taken from him, and did the same in 1872. The Wheeler Adjustment, passed by the Louisiana legislature in March 1875, did not allow Elam to take his Louisiana State Senate seat for the 1874 election. The elections continued to be marked by violence by the White League, a paramilitary group that supported the Democratic Party, disrupted Republican gatherings and worked to suppress black voting.

In 1876, Elam, a secessionist and former Confederate state legislator, was elected to the United States Congress in the Forty-fifth Congress. A national political compromise of that year allowed him and other Democrats to take office, along with the accession of Republican Rutherford Hayes as President. Elam was reelected to the Forty-sixth Congress for Louisiana's 4th district.

During his reelection campaign of 1878, Elam was severely injured in a stagecoach accident. In 1881, he returned to Louisiana to practice law in Mansfield, where he died at the age of sixty-three.

== Personal life ==
Elam was twice widowed and had eight children by his third wife, Harriet Spencer Elam. Son Charles Wheaton Elam, the brother of Joseph Elam, Jr., served in the Louisiana House from 1892 to 1896, and Joseph Barton Elam, Jr., was the mayor of Mansfield from 1914 to 1920.

== Citations ==
Political offices
Preceded by Adolphus Olivier	Speaker of the Louisiana House of Representatives (Confederate); 1863–1864; Simeon Belden (Union); 1862 – 1864	Succeeded by Duncan S. Cage
U.S. House of Representatives
Preceded by William Mallory Levy	Member of the U.S. House of Representatives from Louisiana's 4th congressional district 1877 – 1881	Succeeded by Newton Crain Blanchard
