= David A. Randall (politician) =

American politician

Speaker of the Louisiana House of Representatives
- In office 1846–1846
- Preceded by: Antoine Boudousquie
- Succeeded by: Preston W. Farrar

Personal details
- Party: Democratic and Whig Party

David A. Randall was an American state legislator in Louisiana who served as the 16th speaker of the Louisiana House of Representatives, a position he held in 1846. He represented Acadia Parish in the Louisiana House of Representatives from 1818 to 1820 and Ascension Parish from 1820 to 1826 as well as from 1846 to 1848 as part of the Whig Party.
