= Morris Lottinger =

Morris Lottinger may refer to:

- Morris Lottinger Sr. (1902–1978), American politician and judge in Louisiana
- Morris Lottinger Jr. (born c. 1937), his son, American politician and judge in Louisiana
