= Ralph Norman Bauer =

American politician (1899–1963)

Louisiana State Representative for St. Mary Parish
- In office 1928–1936
- Preceded by: George T. Veeder
- Succeeded by: C. Russel Brownell, Sr.

Louisiana State Representative for St. Mary Parish
- In office 1940–1948
- Preceded by: C. Russel Brownell, Sr.
- Succeeded by: E. J. Grizzaffi

Speaker of the Louisiana House of Representatives
- In office 1940–1948
- Preceded by: Lorris M. Wimberly
- Succeeded by: Morris Lottinger, Sr.

Personal details
- Born: May 1899 Patterson; St. Mary Parish; Louisiana, USA
- Died: March 13, 1963 (aged 63)
- Party: Democratic
- Spouse: Norma Wooster Bauer
- Children: Carl W. Bauer
- Occupation: Lawyer

Ralph Norman Bauer, sometimes known as R. Norman Bauer (May 1899 - March 13, 1963), was a lawyer from Franklin in St. Mary Parish, Louisiana, who served as a Democratic member of the Louisiana House of Representatives from 1928 to 1936 and again from 1940 to 1948. During his last two terms, Bauer was the Speaker of the chamber, having served in that capacity under the administrations of Governors Sam Houston Jones and Jimmie Davis.

== Biography ==
Bauer was born in Patterson in St. Mary Parish to Theodore Bauer (1867-1919) and the former Ernestine Norman (1868-1944). He married the former Margaret Wooster, who was also a lawyer, and the couple adopted her distant cousin, Carl Packard Wiegmann, then twelve years of age. They renamed him Carl Wiegmann Bauer. From 1966 to 1976, Carl Bauer served in both houses of the Louisiana State Legislature from St. Mary Parish. A lawyer and businessman, Carl Bauer spent his later years as chief lobbyist for the University of Louisiana at Lafayette.

Bauer was in law practice with his brother Theodore Bauer and near the end of his career with his son, Carl, as well. Norman Bauer Drive in Franklin, Louisiana, is named in his honor.

== Political career ==
In the 1929 legislative session, freshman lawmakers Bauer and Cecil Morgan of Shreveport and second-term member Mason Spencer of Madison Parish, formed what was known as the "Dynamite Squad" to impeach Governor Huey Pierce Long, Jr., for a long list of abuses of power. Key Long supporters, including John Baptiste Fournet, Allen J. Ellender, and Lorris M. Wimberly in the House, and a phalanx of defenders in the Louisiana State Senate prevented conviction and removal from office.

Preceded by George T. Veeder	Louisiana State Representative from St. Mary Parish; Ralph Norman Bauer; 1928-1936	Succeeded by C. Russel Brownell, Sr.
Preceded by C. Russel Brownell, Sr.	Louisiana State Representative from St. Mary Parish; Ralph Norman Bauer; 1940-1948	Succeeded by E. J. Grizzaffi
Preceded by Lorris M. Wimberly	Speaker of the Louisiana House of Representatives; Ralph Norman Bauer; 1940-1948	Succeeded by Morris Lottinger, Sr.
