= James Stuart Douglas =

American politician

Speaker of the Louisiana House of Representatives
- In office 1924–1924
- Preceded by: R. F. Walker
- Succeeded by: William Clark Hughes

Personal details
- Born: July 29, 1876 Mansfield, Louisiana, US
- Died: September 20, 1924 (aged 48) Dixie, Louisiana, US
- Party: Democratic

James Stuart Douglas was an American state legislator in Louisiana who served as the 50th speaker of the Louisiana House of Representatives in 1924 until his death in the same year. He represented Caddo Parish in the Louisiana House of Representatives from 1916 to 1924 until his death as part of the Democratic Party.

Douglas was the son of Jackson Douglas and Mary Amelia Thom. He was married to Blanche Madeline Birdwell, with whom he had one daughter.

Douglas owned Killarney Farm in Dixie, Louisiana, with it being designed and built by Edward F. Neild in 1920.
