= Hardtner =

Hardtner may refer to:

- Hardtner, Kansas, a city in Kansas, United States
- Henry E. Hardtner (1870–1935), American businessman and conservationist
