= George Wescott Southwick =

American doctor, businessman, Butterfield Trail scout, newspaper publisher

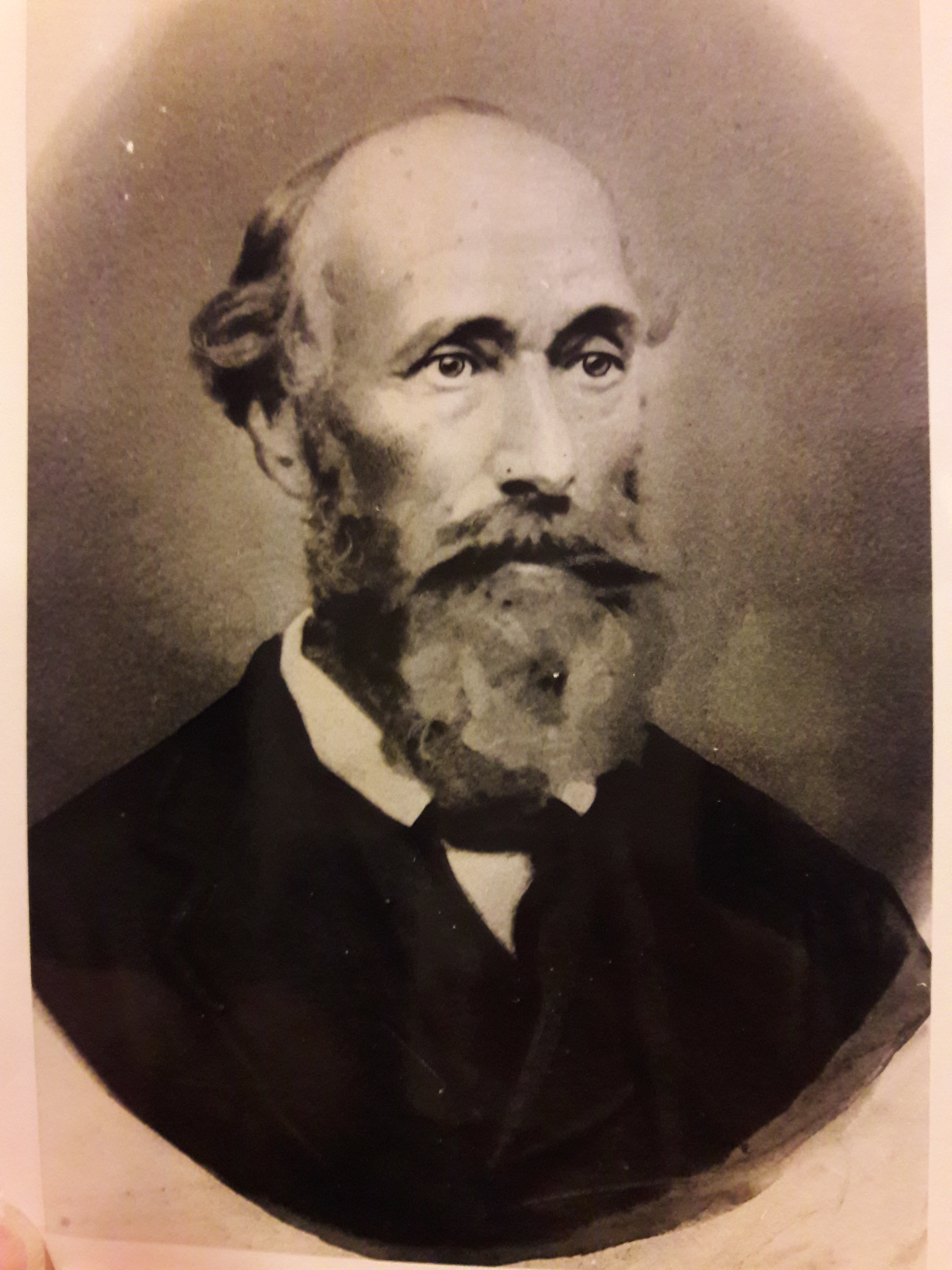
- George Wescott Southwick portrait c. 1860
- Born: October 5, 1816; Kentucky, U.S.
- Died: March 23, 1870 (aged 53); Pineville, Louisiana, U.S.
- Burial place: Mt. Olivet Episcopal Church and Cemetery
- Known for: Butterfield Overland Mail Trail
- Spouse: Adelphia Florillia Converse Southwick
- Children: 4

George Wescott Southwick (October 5, 1816 – March 23, 1870) was the scout for the Texas segment of the Butterfield Overland Mail Trail, the longest stage coach line in the world. He was a physician, founder of several general merchandise stores, a lumber investor, real estate prospector, and founder of the Rapides Gazette newspaper in Rapides Parish, Louisiana.

Born in Kentucky, Southwick attended pharmacy school in New York City in 1838, and relocated to St. Louis, Missouri. He married Adelphia Converse May 28, 1846. In 1847 he took sole ownership of a dry goods store in Pine Bluff, Arkansas. In 1852–1854 he and his wife bought and sold one thousand acres in Houston County, Texas. In 1847–1848 during the Mexican–American War and under Secretary of State James Buchanan, he held a mission to Veracruz where he "rendered efficient service to the United States government" and was discharged in 1848.

== Scouting the Butterfield-Overland Trail in Texas ==
In 1849, he was hired to lead New York mining executives of the Mackinac Mining Company and the Buffalo Mining Company to California during the California gold rush. In 1857, he was hired to scout the longest section, 1,200-mile, from St. Louis, Missouri to El Paso, Texas of the Butterfield Overland Mail Trail, the first transcontinental mail route in the US. He left St. Louis in January 1858 for four months meeting with various locals, including officials in Sherman, Texas, to discuss the route, completing it in El Paso, Texas where he met the other half of the Butterfield scouting party. It included John Butterfield and his employee, Marquis L. Kenyon, keyman of the trail project. The trail became the longest stagecoach line in the world. It ceased activity after the Civil War started in 1861.

== Civil War ==
Southwick moved to Pineville, Louisiana, c. 1862 during the American Civil War though he was a Unionist. During the Red River campaign, US General Nathaniel P. Banks occupied Alexandria, Louisiana (next to Pineville, Louisiana). There were furious actions around Alexandria. George and his wife sided with the Union, exchanged letters with Admiral Farragut but destroyed them because it might have caused their death. Nevertheless, Union soldiers expropriated the Southwicks some 100,000 feet of lumber, 54 mules and other livestock, threatened their lives, and arrested George on charges of giving information and assistance to the federal army. He was imprisoned for eight weeks in the Market House in 1864. He never took an oath to the Confederates. He was released from prison by order of Govenor Henry Allen and given protection papers by General Banks. In 1874 after the war and after George's death, Adelphia and George filed federal law suit for reimbursement of their property. The suit was unsuccessful. (Court transcript available below in Wikisource.)

== Rapides Gazette Newspaper ==
Still in Alexandria/Pineville, in early 1869 Southwick founded and published the pro-Union Rapides Gazette newspaper. After his death it was continued by T. G. Compton and was published during Reconstruction. Regarding its contents, Southwick's obituary states, "he conducted it in a fair and impartial manner, and never gave just offence to anyone."

== Family ==
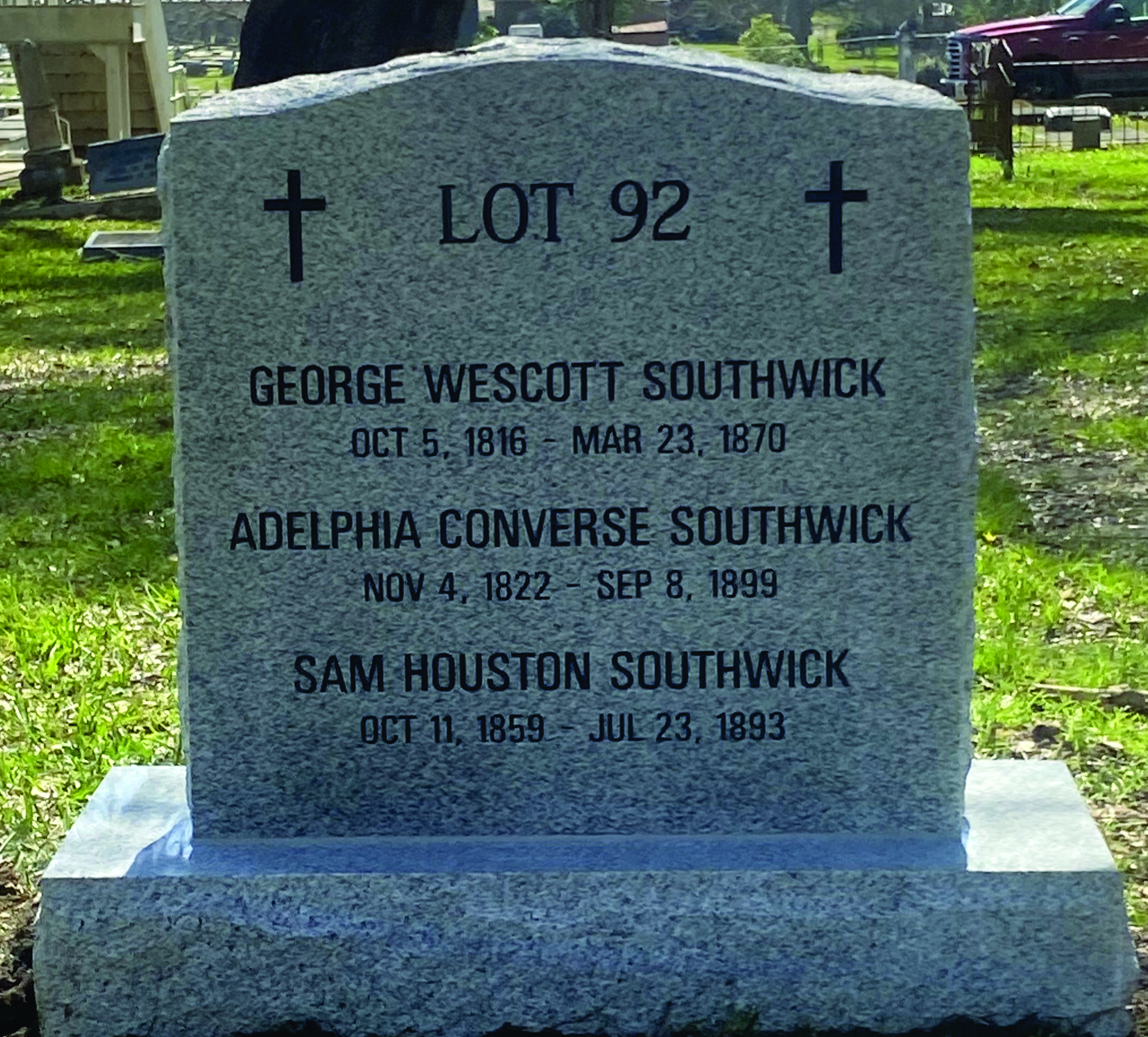
George Wescott Southwick, Adelphia Southwick, Sam Southwick.

He married Adelphia Florillia Converse from New York County on May 28, 1846. She was a descendant of Deacon Edward Convers, who arrived in America from England with Governor John Winthrop on the Arbella in 1630, and daughter of Captain John Mason Converse of St. Louis, Missouri. The Converse family also descends from Richard F. Warren, a Mayflower passenger in 1620. Southwick and his wife had four children, three of whom lived to adulthood:

- George Arthur Southwick (October 1, 1847 – January 5, 1907)
- Mary Adelphia Southwick (August 10, 1854 – October 28, 1932)
- Sam Houston Southwick (October 11, 1859 – July 23, 1893)
- Mason Converse Southwick (September 13, 1863 – July 28, 1864)

== Death and burial ==
Southwick died March 23, 1870, at his home in Pineville, Louisiana, of pneumonia and is buried at Mt. Olivet Episcopal Church and Cemetery with his wife and three of their children.
