= Charles W. Lowell =

American politician

Speaker of the Louisiana House of Representatives
- In office 1868–1869
- Preceded by: Duncan Cage
- Succeeded by: Mortimer Carr
- In office 1873–1874
- Preceded by: O. H. Brewster
- Succeeded by: Louis A. Wiltz

Personal details
- Born: November 20, 1834 Farmington, Maine, U.S.
- Died: October 3, 1877 (aged 42) Foxcroft, Maine, U.S.
- Spouse(s): Mary Elizabeth Chandler (m. 1860; died 1864) Sarah "Sally" W. Huff (m. 1870)
- Children: 1
- Education: Bowdoin College

Charles Winthrop Lowell (November 20, 1834 – October 3, 1877) was an American lawyer, commanding officer of a "colored" unit of the Union Army during the American Civil War, state legislator and postmaster in New Orleans, Louisiana.

He was born in Farmingham, Maine, November 20, 1834, to Phillip Smith Lowell and Harriet Butler Lowell. In 1859 he graduated from Bowdoin College before going on to study law with the father of his future wife Hon. Charles P. Chandler. He was admitted to the Maine Bar January, 1860.

He married Mary Elizabeth Chandler June 1860, and together they had a daughter born January 18, 1864, named Mary Chandler Lowell, and unfortunately Mary Elizabeth died just six days after giving birth. Around 1870 he got married again to Sarah "Sally" W. Huff, but they did not have any children together.

In February 1863, Lowell was appointed by Governor Abner Coburn to serve as a captain of the United States Colored Troops, and continued to serve after the war ended.

He settled in New Orleans after the war, and was first a colonel and then was appointed to the position of provost marshal general.

He served as Speaker of the Louisiana House of Representatives, first elected in July 1868, and then again unanimously elected on December 9, 1872. He was identified as from Jefferson when he was re-elected as speaker in 1872.

In May 1877 he left New Orleans and returned to New England where he was expected to die as he had been in bad health for two years and had been declining recently. He died on October 3, 1877, in Foxcroft, Maine.

== See also ==
- List of speakers of the Louisiana House of Representatives
