= Bledsoe =

Bledsoe may refer to:

== People ==
- Albert Taylor Bledsoe (1809–1877), American educator, attorney, author, and clergyman
- Amanda Mays Bledsoe (born 1978), American politician
- Amani Bledsoe (born 1998), American football player
- Aubrey Kingsbury (née Bledsoe, born 1991), American soccer player
- Ben Bledsoe (born 1982), American pop singer
- Benjamin Franklin Bledsoe (1874–1938), American federal judge
- Country Jim Bledsoe (1930–1988), American blues singer and songwriter
- Curtis Bledsoe (born 1957), former American football player
- Drew Bledsoe (born 1972), former American football quarterback
- Eric Bledsoe (born 1989), American basketball player
- Jerry Bledsoe (1941–2025), American author and journalist
- Jesse Bledsoe (1776–1836), American politician
- Joshuah Bledsoe (born 1997), American football player
- Jules Bledsoe (1898–1943), African American singer
- Lucy Jane Bledsoe (born 1957), American novelist and science writer
- Neal Bledsoe (born 1981), Canadian actor
- Samuel T. Bledsoe (1868–1939), American railroad executive
- Tempestt Bledsoe (born 1973), American actress
- Terry Bledsoe (1934–2015), Sportswriter and NFL executive
- Tim Bledsoe (born 1953), American politician and college professor
- William H. Bledsoe (1869–1936), American politician
- Woody Bledsoe (1921–1995), American mathematician and computer scientist

== Places ==
- Bledsoe, Kentucky
- Bledsoe, Texas
- Bledsoe County, Tennessee

== See also ==
- Bledsoe's Missouri Battery – Unit of the Confederate States Army
- Bledsoe's Station
