= George W. Carter =

American politician (1826–1901)

Speaker of the Louisiana House of Representatives
- In office 1871–1871
- Preceded by: Mortimer Carr
- Succeeded by: O. H. Brewster

Personal details
- Born: 1826 Virginia
- Died: 1901 (aged 74–75)
- Party: Republican

George Washington Carter was an American state legislator in Louisiana who served as the 30th speaker of the Louisiana House of Representatives in 1871. He represented Cameron Parish in the Louisiana House of Representatives in 1871 as part of the Republican Party. He was the Minister Resident to Venezuela for the United States from June 30, 1881 to May 16, 1882. He was a confederate officer and colonel and formed the Carter's Lancers regiment.
