= Robert Angelle =

American politician (1896–1979)

Member of the Louisiana House of Representatives
- In office 1934–1964

Speaker of the Louisiana House of Representatives
- In office 1957–1960
- Preceded by: Lorris Wimberly
- Succeeded by: J. Thomas Jewell

Personal details
- Born: August 26, 1896 Cecilia, Louisiana, U.S.
- Died: December 22, 1979 (aged 83)
- Party: Democratic
- Relatives: Paul Hardy (nephew)

Robert Angelle (August 26, 1896 – December 22, 1979) was an American politician. He served as a Democratic member of the Louisiana House of Representatives.

== Life and career ==
Angelle was born in Cecilia, Louisiana. He attended Southwestern Louisiana Institute.

Angelle served in the Louisiana House of Representatives from 1934 to 1964.

Angelle died on December 22, 1979, at the age of 83.
