= Samuel P. Henry =

American politician (1830–1902)

Speaker of the Louisiana House of Representatives
- In office 1888–1892
- Preceded by: Henry W. Ogden
- Succeeded by: George W. Bolton

Speaker of the Louisiana House of Representatives
- In office 1896–1900
- Preceded by: George W. Bolton
- Succeeded by: Jared Y. Sanders Sr.

Personal details
- Born: 1830 Lancaster, Pennsylvania
- Died: March 17, 1902 (aged 71–72) Cameron, Louisiana
- Party: Democratic

Samuel P. Henry was an American state legislator in Louisiana who served as the 41st and 43rd speaker of the Louisiana House of Representatives from 1888 to 1892 and 1896 to 1900. He represented Cameron Parish in the Louisiana House of Representatives from 1880 to 1892 and again in 1896 to 1901 as part of the Democratic Party.

Henry lead the movement to separate Calcasieu Parish into Cameron Parish, where he held office as a judge, post master, president of the school board, and treasurer of the parish before serving in the Louisiana House of Representatives.
