= Charles Morrison (disambiguation) =

Charles Morrison (1932–2005) was a British Conservative politician and MP for Devizes.

Charles Morrison may also refer to:

- Sir Charles Morison (MP for Tavistock) (1549–1599), or Morrison, English politician in the reign of Queen Elizabeth I
- Sir Charles Morrison, 1st Baronet (1587–1628), English politician in the reigns of King James VI & I and King Charles I
- Charles Clayton Morrison (1874–1966), American Disciples of Christ minister and Christian socialist
- Charles Morrison (cricketer) (1883–1948), West Indian cricketer
- Chick Morrison (1878–1924), American silent film actor
- Charlie Morrison (field hockey) (born 2003), field hockey player from New Zealand
- Charles H. Morrison, lawyer, Confederate officer, and state legislator in Louisiana

== See also ==
- Charles Morison (1861–1920), New Zealand barrister and politician
- Morrison (surname)
