= Pierre Bauchet St. Martin =

Former American politician

Speaker of the Louisiana House of Representatives
- In office 1812–1813
- Preceded by: Position established (Magloire Guichard in the Territory of Orleans)
- Succeeded by: Stephen A. Hopkins

Personal details
- Born: 1761 New Orleans
- Died: 1830 (aged 68–69)
- Party: Democratic-Republican

Pierre Bauchet St. Martin was the first speaker of the Louisiana House of Representatives, a position he held for less than a year.
