= Magloire Guichard =

Former American politician

Speaker of the Louisiana House of Representatives
- In office 1814–1817
- Preceded by: Stephen A. Hopkins
- Succeeded by: David C. Ker

Personal details
- Party: Democratic-Republican

Magloire Guichard was the second speaker of the Louisiana House of Representatives, a position he held from 1814 to 1817. He represented Orleans Parish in Louisiana from 1812 to 1818.
