= Mortimer Carr =

American politician from Louisiana

Speaker of the Louisiana House of Representatives
- In office 1870–1871
- Preceded by: Charles W. Lowell
- Succeeded by: George W. Carter

Mortimer Carr was a politician in Louisiana during the Reconstruction era. He served as Speaker of the Louisiana House of Representatives. He represented De Soto in the Louisiana House from 1868 to 1870 and served as Speaker from 1870 to 1873. According to an account written in 1890 he never saw the parish he was elected to and tricked Blacks into voting for him. F. C. Antoine, Chairman of the Elections Committee, and other members rejected a challenge to his eligibility.

He was ousted as Speaker by a faction of Republicans that joined with Democrats. He was described as a "Scalawag". He and E. W. Dewees were allies of governor Warmouth.
