= Charles Johnson (defensive back) =

American football player (born 1956)

No. 44, 46, 38
- Position: Defensive back

Personal information
- Born: May 5, 1956 (age 70); Mansfield, Louisiana, U.S.
- Listed height: 5 ft 10 in (1.78 m)
- Listed weight: 182 lb (83 kg)

Career information
- High school: Mansfield (Louisiana)
- College: Grambling State (1975–1978)
- NFL draft: 1979: 4th round, 101st overall pick

Career history
- Atlanta Falcons (1979)*; San Francisco 49ers (1979–1980); St. Louis Cardinals (1981); Ottawa Rough Riders (1982–1984)
- * Offseason or practice squad member only

Career NFL statistics
- Interceptions: 2
- Fumble recoveries: 1
- Stats at Pro Football Reference

Charles Adrian Johnson (born May 5, 1956) is an American former professional football player who was a defensive back for three seasons in the National Football League (NFL) with the San Francisco 49ers and St. Louis Cardinals. He was selected by the Atlanta Falcons in the fourth round of the 1979 NFL draft after playing college football for the Grambling State Tigers. He was also a member of the Ottawa Rough Riders of the Canadian Football League (CFL).

== Early life and college ==
Charles Adrian Johnson was born on May 5, 1956, in Mansfield, Louisiana, and attended Mansfield High School there. He was a member of the Tigers of Grambling State University from 1975 to 1978. His seven interceptions in 1977 were tied for the third most in the country with seven other players.

== Professional career ==
Johnson was selected by the Atlanta Falcons in the fourth round, with the 101st overall pick, of the 1979 NFL draft. He was released by the Falcons on August 21, 1979.

Johnson signed with the San Francisco 49ers on November 14, 1979, and played in four games during the 1979 season. He appeared in all 16 games, starting 14, in 1980, recording one interception, two kick returns for ten yards, one fumble, and one fumble recovery. He was released by the 49ers on August 25, 1981.

Johnson was signed by the St. Louis Cardinals on November 18, 1981. He played in five games for the Cardinals during the 1981 season, totaling one interception and one fumble. He was released on August 23, 1982.

Johnson dressed in six games for the Ottawa Rough Riders of the Canadian Football League (CFL) in 1982 and intercepted four passes. He dressed in 11 games during the 1983 season and recorded one interception. He dressed in 14 games for Ottawa in 1984, totaling two interceptions for 40 yards and one touchdown and one sack.
