= Sylura Barron =

American political activist (1900–1997)

- Sylura Barron, from a 1942 publication.
- Born: Sylura Richardson; December 25, 1900; Mansfield, Louisiana
- Died: 4 November 1997 (aged 96)
- Known for: first African-American woman delegate to a national political convention (1948)

Sylura Richardson Barron (December 25, 1900 – November 4, 1997) was an African-American political activist in San Diego, California from the 1940s into the 1990s. In 1948, she became the first black woman to be a delegate at a national political convention in the United States, when she represented California at the Democratic National Convention in Philadelphia that year.

== Early life ==
Sylura Richardson was born in Mansfield, Louisiana, the daughter of Richard Richardson and Cornelia Booker Richardson. Her father was a Baptist minister.

== Career ==
Barron and her husband owned and operated a liquor store in San Diego. She was president of the Negro Women's Republican Educational League, the National Negro Day Committee, and an active member of Calvary Baptist Church, where she sometimes played the organ. She changed her party affiliation from Republican to Democratic as a supporter of Franklin D. Roosevelt. In 1948, Barron became the first black woman to be a delegate at a national political convention, when she represented California in the Truman delegation at the Democratic National Convention in Philadelphia that year. Although she was a credentialed delegate, she and her husband were not allowed to join other delegates at a hotel banquet, presumably due to her show of exuberance on the convention floor earlier in the day, when she grabbed the California flag and ran out to be the first state to declare support for Truman while Southern state delegates were trying to draft Eisenhower. Secret Service agents came to her hotel room saying: "'it's not advisable for you to come down,' that this wasn't no Southern state now, this was Philadelphia", and had the food sent up to their room instead.

Barron briefly left the Democratic party in 1951, when she was running for a City Council seat in San Diego. In 1957 she attended the California State Baptist Convention. She was president of San Diego's John F. Kennedy Democratic Club in 1960. In 1972, she was vice-president of Democratic Woman Power, a Democratic women's club founded that year in San Diego.

In 1980, she was again a delegate to the Democratic National Convention, supporting the re-election of Jimmy Carter. In 1981, she had a heart attack just before Election Day, and told a reporter from her hospital bed that it was her first time voting by absentee ballot since the 1930s. In her nineties, she was still active in community celebrations, including the Martin Luther King Jr. Day parade in San Diego in 1992.

== Personal life ==
Sylura Richardson married William M. Barron. She died on November 4, 1997, after her death she was honored by California congressman Bob Filner on the floor of the U. S. House of Representatives, for her lifetime of political engagement: "Throughout her life, Sylura fought to promote educational and business opportunities in communities that often lacked strong and determined representation," he recalled. "Sylura was a thoughtful and eloquent promoter of a society that could step beyond divisions of race, class, ethnicity, gender, and sexual orientation. Sylura was a voice for all of us."
