= David C. Ker =

Former American politician

Speaker of the Louisiana House of Representatives
- In office 1818–1819
- Preceded by: Stephen A. Hopkins
- Succeeded by: Arnaud Beauvais

Personal details
- Party: Democratic-Republican

David Corbin Ker (1772–1840) was a physician who served as the fourth speaker of the Louisiana House of Representatives, a position he held from 1818 to 1819. He represented Orleans Parish in the Louisiana House of Representatives.
