= Charles Wheaton Elam =

American politician (1866–1917)

Charles Wheaton Elam, Sr.

Member of the Louisiana House of Representatives from DeSoto ParishLouisiana
- In office 1892–1896
- Preceded by: W. C. Harris; B. F. Jenkins
- Succeeded by: W. C. Scott

Personal details
- Born: March 18, 1866 Mansfield, Louisiana
- Died: September 5, 1917 (aged 51) Mansfield, Louisiana
- Party: Democratic
- Spouse: Lucy Belle Burden Elam
- Relations: Joseph Barton Elam, Jr. (brother); Harmon Drew, Jr. (great-nephew)
- Children: Charles Wheaton Elam, Jr. Daniel Elam Emma Gertrude Elam
- Parent(s): Joseph Barton Elam, Sr. Mary Elizabeth Stewart Elam
- Education: Louisiana State University
- Profession: Lawyer

Charles Wheaton Elam, Sr. (March 18, 1866 - September 5, 1917), was a Democratic politician from his native Mansfield, a small city in DeSoto Parish in northwestern Louisiana, USA.

Political offices
Preceded by W. C. Harris; B. F. Jenkins	Louisiana State Representative from DeSoto Parish; 1892–1896	Succeeded by W. C. Scott
