= William W. Pugh =

American politician (1811-1906)

Speaker of the Louisiana House of Representatives
- In office 1856–1859
- Preceded by: John M. Sandidge
- Succeeded by: Charles H. Morrison

Personal details
- Born: January 18, 1811 North Carolina
- Died: January 10, 1906 (aged 94) Napoleonville, Louisiana
- Party: Democratic

William Whitmell Hill Pugh was an American state legislator in Louisiana who served as the 22nd speaker of the Louisiana House of Representatives from 1856 to 1859. He represented Assumption Parish in the Louisiana House of Representatives from 1846 to 1847 and 1854 to 1859 as part of the Democratic Party.

Pugh was a colonel in a regiment of the Assumption militia. He married William Ann Thompson in 1831 and then married Josephine W. Nicholls in 1844. He fathered a total of 14 children.
