= Richard Flournoy Walker =

American politician

Speaker of the Louisiana House of Representatives
- In office 1920–1924
- Preceded by: Hewitt Bouanchaud
- Succeeded by: J. Stuart Douglas

Personal details
- Party: Democratic

Richard Flournoy Walker was an American state legislator in Louisiana who served as the 50th speaker of the Louisiana House of Representatives from 1920 to 1924. He represented East Feliciana in the Louisiana House of Representatives from 1904 to 1908 and again from 1920 to 1924 as part of the Democratic Party.
