= Jeter Jones =

American veteran and musician

Jeter Jones is an American military decorated combat veteran and award-winning southern soul blues recording artist and songwriter.

== Military career ==
Jeter Jones is from Mansfield, Louisiana. He served in combat during the Afghanistan War and in Iraq with the Marines and then US Army following 9-11, and retired after twenty years of service at the rank of Sergeant First Class.

== Blues music ==
In 2013 Jeter Jones began to record original Blues and Trailride music, and released his first three albums while still in the military. In 2015 he released the album Da GQ Country Boy and in 2016 he released the album Trailride Certified. In 2018 he released the album Dhis Him, and in 2020 he released the album Mufassa and "2 Kings". As a stage performer, Jones also goes by the name “Da Kang of Trailride Blues”. His music has been described as a blend of “blues, R&B, soul, and hip-hop”. He has also partnered with Sir Charles Jones to record under the group name The Jones Boyz.

Jones is a ZBT, JMA, and Blues Critic Award winner, including the 2016 Blues/Southern Soul Artist of the Year. From 2017 to 2019 he was the winner of the Blue's Critic award for Best Dance Or Funk Song for his tracks “ZBT Anthem”, “Black Horse” and “Trail Ride” and in 2019 and 2020 he was the winner of the Southern Soul Artist of the Year award.

In 2021, his album 2 Kings reached number 11 on the Billboard Blues Albums Chart.
