= Antoine Boudousquie =

American politician (1803–1855)

Speaker of the Louisiana House of Representatives
- In office 1845–1845
- Preceded by: Charles Derbigny
- Succeeded by: David A. Randall

Personal details
- Born: May 9, 1803 New Orleans, Louisiana, U.S.
- Died: November 25, 1855 (aged 52)
- Party: Whig

Antoine Boudousquie (1803 – 1855) an American state legislator in Louisiana who served as the 15th speaker of the Louisiana House of Representatives in 1845. He represented St. John the Baptist Parish in the Louisiana House of Representatives from 1842 to 1848 as part of the Whig Party. He was married to Sophie Andry Boudousquie, with whom he owned the Godchaux–Reserve Plantation.
