= Vail M. Delony =

American politician

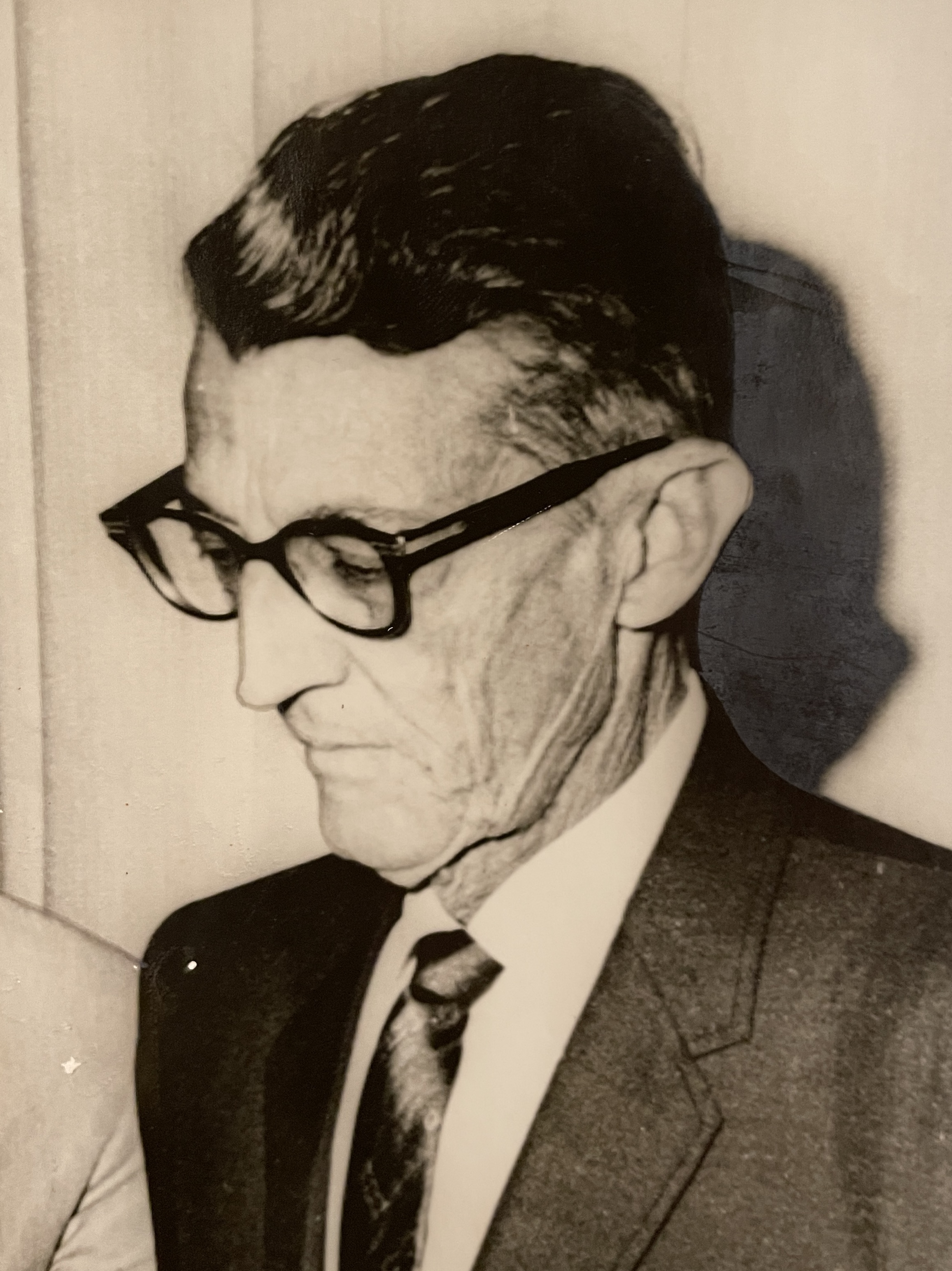

Speaker of the Louisiana House of Representatives
- In office 1964–1967
- Preceded by: J. Thomas Jewell
- Succeeded by: John S. Garrett

Personal details
- Born: January 5, 1901 Lake Providence, Louisiana
- Died: November 18, 1967 (aged 66)
- Party: Democratic
- Profession: Politician

Vail Montgomery Delony (1901-1967) was a politician from East Carroll Parish, Louisiana, United States. He served as Speaker of the Louisiana House of Representatives from 1964 to 1967.
