= J. Thomas Jewell =

American politician (1909-1993)

Speaker of the Louisiana House of Representatives
- In office 1960–1964
- Preceded by: Robert Angelle
- Succeeded by: Vail M. Delony

Personal details
- Born: J. Thomas Jewell; March 6, 1909 Mix, Louisiana
- Died: December 1993 (aged 84)
- Party: Democratic

J. Thomas Jewell (March 6, 1909-December 1993) was a lawyer and state legislator in Louisiana who served eight consecutive terms in the Louisiana House of Representatives including as the 62nd Speaker of the Louisiana House of Representatives from 1960 to 1964. He represented Pointe Coupee Parish in the Louisiana House of Representatives from 1936 to 1968 as part of the Democratic Party.

He was born in Mix, Louisiana, named for his grandfather Thomas Mix. He served on the Committee of Ways and Means.
