= Joseph W. Hyams =

American politician (1864–1912)

Speaker of the Louisiana House of Representatives
- In office 1906–1908
- Preceded by: Robert H. Snyder
- Succeeded by: H. Garland Dupré

Personal details
- Born: October 13, 1864 West Baton Rouge Parish, Louisiana
- Died: February 2, 1912 (aged 47) New Orleans, Louisiana
- Party: Democratic

Joseph W. Hyams (October 13, 1860 - February 2, 1912) was an American state legislator in Louisiana who served as the 46th speaker of the Louisiana House of Representatives from 1906 to 1908. He represented West Baton Rouge Parish in the Louisiana House of Representatives from 1888 to 1908 as part of the Democratic Party.
