= Charles Derbigny =

Former American politician (1792–1874)

Speaker of the Louisiana House of Representatives
- In office 1843–1844
- Preceded by: William C. C. Claiborne II
- Succeeded by: Antoine Boudousquie

Personal details
- Born: 1792 Pittsburgh, Pennsylvania
- Died: December 29, 1874 (aged 81–82) New Orleans, Louisiana
- Party: Whig

Charles Zenon Derbigny (1792-1874) was a state legislator in Louisiana who served as the 14th speaker of the Louisiana House of Representatives from 1843 to 1844. He represented Jefferson Parish in the Louisiana House of Representatives from 1820 to 1822 and from 1842 to 1844 as part of the Whig Party. He was the son of Jeanne Delassus and Pierre Derbigny, the sixth American elected governor of Louisiana. He was married to Josephine Eulalie Le Breton. Derbigny was a candidate in the 1855 Louisiana gubernatorial election as a member of the Know Nothing Party, receiving 45.57% of the vote and losing to Robert C. Wickliffe.
