= Morris Lottinger Sr. =

American politician (1902–1978)

Morris Albert Lottinger Sr.

Louisiana State Representative from Terrebonne Parish
- In office 1936–1950
- Preceded by: Allen J. Ellender
- Succeeded by: Carroll L. Dupont

Speaker of the Louisiana House of Representatives
- In office 1948–1950
- Preceded by: Ralph Norman Bauer
- Succeeded by: Lorris M. Wimberly

Personal details
- Born: August 16, 1902 Houma, Terrebonne Parish; Louisiana, US
- Died: November 1978 (aged 76)
- Party: Democratic
- Spouse: Effie J. Hellier Lottinger
- Children: Elizabeth Lottinger ___; Morris Lottinger Jr.
- Occupation: Lawyer and Judge

Morris Albert Lottinger Sr. (August 16, 1902 – November 1978), was a Democratic attorney who served in the Louisiana House of Representatives from 1936 until 1950 from his native Houma in Terrebonne Parish in South Louisiana. For the last two years of his tenure, he was the Speaker of the chamber under Governor Earl Kemp Long.

== Background ==
Lottinger was one of three sons of the former Lucille Theriot and Victor Lottinger (died July 1939); his brothers were Mark Lottinger of Houma and Lucius Lottinger of DeRidder in Beauregard Parish. Lottinger's paternal grandparents were Frederick and Marie Dugas Lottinger. In 1926, Lottinger was president of the Houma chapter of Rotary International.

In the 1940 United States census, Representative Lottinger was listed as living with his wife, the former Effie J. Hellier (1908–1993), and their two children, Elizabeth (born 1932) and Morris Jr. (born 1937), in the Houma household of her father, Harry Hellier Sr. (born c. 1880).

== Political career ==
Lottinger ran for the House in the 1932 party primary but lost, 1,638 to 1,221, to Allen J. Ellender, a favorite of the Long faction of the Louisiana Democratic Party, who became Speaker in May of that year. Lottinger was elected four years later to succeed Ellender, who instead went to the United States Senate upon his election to fill the seat formerly held by his ally, Huey Pierce Long Jr. Huey Long's brother, Earl Long proposed Lottinger for Speaker in 1948, when Long began the first of his two full four-year terms as governor.

Lottinger resigned from the House in 1950 to become judge of the Louisiana First Circuit Court of Appeal, a position which he held until his resignation in 1975. He had been unopposed for reelection in the year before in 1964. a

His son, Morris Lottinger Jr., represented District 52, including Terrebonne Parish, in the state House from 1971 to 1975. Thereafter, he was a judge of the Louisiana First Circuit Court of Appeal, which includes his Terrebonne Parish. The second Judge Lottinger retired in 1998.

Preceded by Allen J. Ellender	Louisiana State Representative from Terrebonne Parish; Morris Albert Lottinger Sr. 1936–1950	Succeeded by Carroll L. Dupont
Preceded by Ralph Norman Bauer	Speaker of the Louisiana House of Representatives; Morris Albert Lottinger Sr. 1948–1950	Succeeded by Lorris M. Wimberly
