= Simeon Belden =

Louisiana lawyer, judge, and politician

Speaker of the Louisiana House of Representatives
- Preceded by: Adolphus Olivier
- Succeeded by: Duncan Cage

Attorney General of Louisiana
- In office 1868–1871
- Succeeded by: Alexander Pope Field

Personal details
- Born: Simeon Belden Natchitoches, Louisiana
- Party: Republican

Simeon Belden was an American lawyer, judge, and politician who served as the attorney general of Louisiana from 1868 to 1871 and as a member and speaker of the Louisiana House of Representatives. A Republican, he was active during the Reconstruction era.
