= William C. C. Claiborne II =

American politician

Speaker of the Louisiana House of Representatives
- In office 1841–1843
- Preceded by: Guillaume Louis DeBuys
- Succeeded by: Charles Derbigny

Personal details
- Born: 1808
- Died: 1878 (aged 69–70)
- Party: Whig

William Charles Cole Claiborne II (1808–1878) was the 13th speaker of the Louisiana House of Representatives, a position he held from 1841 to 1843. He represented Orleans Parish in the Louisiana House of Representatives. He was the son of William C. C. Claiborne, the first American governor of Louisiana, and Clarissa Duralde, daughter of Martin Duralde of the Attakapas district.
