= List of speakers of the Louisiana House of Representatives =

Speaker of the Louisiana House of Representatives
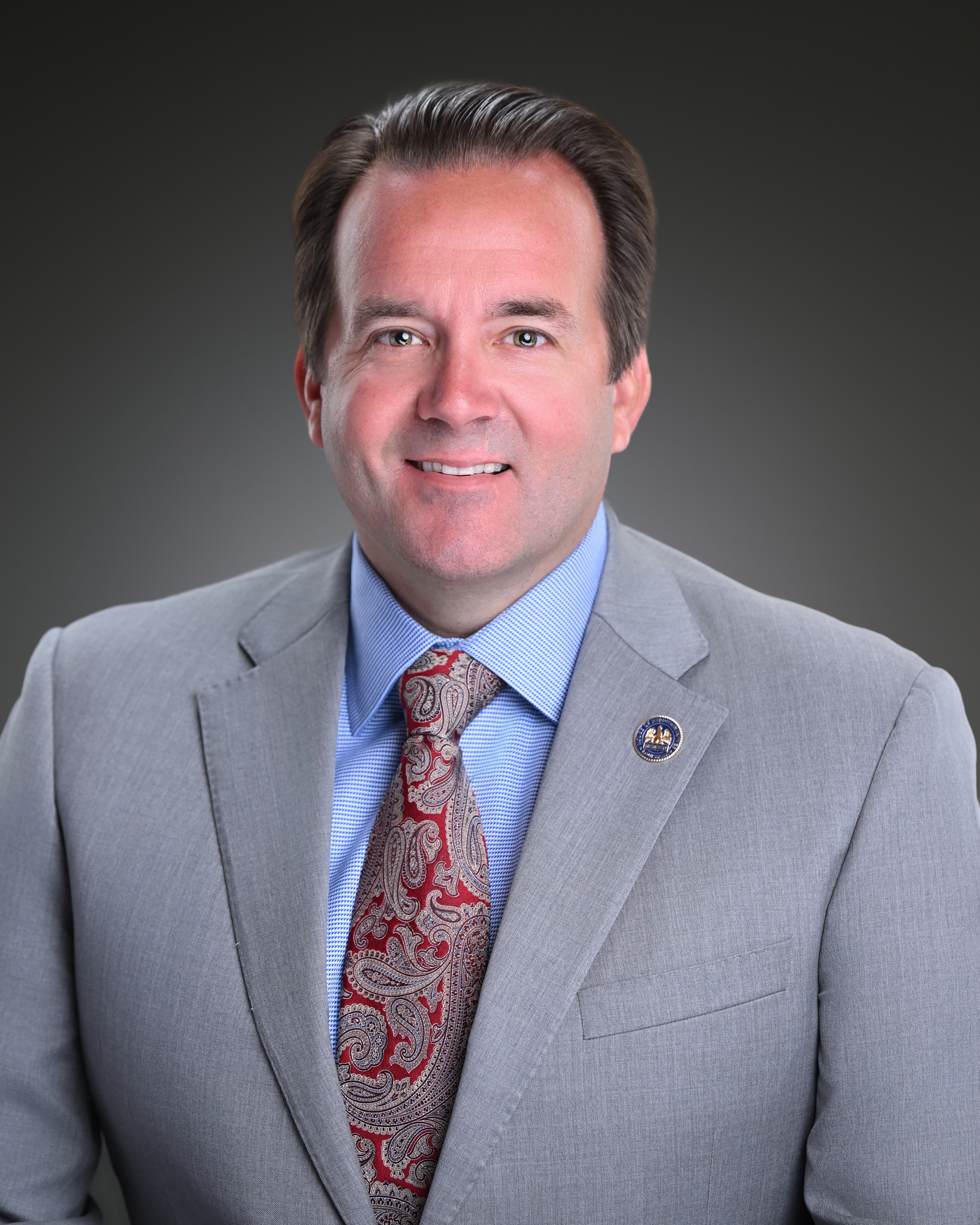
- Incumbent; Phillip DeVillier since January 8, 2024
- Appointer: Louisiana House of Representatives
- Term length: Four years
- Inaugural holder: Pierre Bauchet St. Martin
- Formation: 1812
- Succession: Sixth

The speaker of the Louisiana House of Representatives is the presiding officer of the Louisiana House of Representatives, the lower house of the Louisiana State Legislature. The speaker serves as the leader and head of the Louisiana House. The speaker is traditionally suggested by the Governor of Louisiana. The speaker's counterpart in the State Senate is the President of the Senate, currently Republican Cameron Henry.

== History ==
The first speaker, Pierre Bauchet St. Martin, was elected by the House in 1812. During the first years of statehood the speakership and the Louisiana House of Representative was dominated by supporters of Henry Clay, after 1845 the Democratic Party came to dominate politics until the United States Civil War. After the war the state, along with the rest of the southern states, underwent the Reconstruction from 1865 until 1877, during this time politics were dominated by the Republican Party. In 1877 the Democrats came to power again and stayed in power in the House until late 2010. During this time the practice of the Governor appointing the speaker began. In 2008 Republican Governor Bobby Jindal appointed the first Republican speaker in over a hundred years even though the Democrats held a small majority.

When Democrat John Bel Edwards succeeded Jindal in 2016, his choice as Speaker, Democrat Walt Leger III of New Orleans, was rejected by house's Republican majority, which instead elected fellow Republican Taylor Barras of New Iberia.

== Powers ==
The speaker serves as the presiding officer and highest ranking representative in the Louisiana House of Representatives. He rules on points of order during sessions, makes committee assignments, which are usually actually made by the Governor. The speaker is usually an ally of the Governor and serves as his floor leader in the House, in this role he plays a vital part in passing legislation. The speaker usually is a chief negotiator in getting legislation passed on behalf of the Governor. The speaker leads the coalition of the Governor's supporters in the House, serves as the leader of House of Representatives, he controls the flow of legislation through the House, and serves as an ex officio member of each House committee. The speaker is sixth in the gubernatorial line of succession.

== List of speakers ==
Speaker	Terms of office	Parish	Party
Pierre Bauchet St. Martin	1812	German Coast	Democratic-Republican
Stephen A. Hopkins	1813	Acadia	Democratic-Republican
Magloire Guichard	1814-1817	Orleans	Democratic-Republican
David C. Ker	1819–1820	Orleans	Democratic-Republican
Armand Beauvais	1820–1822	Pointe Coupee	Democratic-Republican
Andre B. Roman	1822–1826	St. James	National Republican
Octave LaBranche	1827–1828	St. Charles	Jacksonian
Andre B. Roman	1828–1830	St. James	National Republican
Alexandre Mouton	1831–1832	Lafayette	Democratic
Alcée Louis la Branche	1833–1837	St. Charles	Democratic
Joseph Marshall Walker	1837–1838	Rapides	Democratic
Guillaume Louis DeBuys	1839–1841	Orleans	Whig
William C. C. Claiborne II	1842–1843	Orleans	Whig
Charles Derbigny	1843–1844	Jefferson	Whig
Antoine Boudousquie	1845	St. John the Baptist	Whig
David A. Randall	1846	Ascension	Democratic
Preston W. Farrar	1847–1850	Orleans	Whig
E. Warren Moise	1850	Plaquemines	Democratic
John Edward King	1852	St. Landry	Whig
E. Warren Moise	1853	Plaquemines	Democratic
John M. Sandidge	1854–1855	Bossier	Democratic
William W. Pugh	1856–1859	Assumption	Democratic
Charles H. Morrison	1860	Ouachita	Democratic
Adolphus Olivier (Confederate)	1861–1863	unknown	Democratic
Joseph Barton Elam (Confederate)	1863–1864	De Soto	Democratic
Simeon Belden (Union)	1864–1865	St. Martin	Republican
Duncan S. Cage	1865–1867	Terrebonne	Republican
Charles W. Lowell	1868–1869	Caddo	Republican
Mortimer Carr	1870–1871	Orleans	Republican
George W. Carter	1871	Cameron	Republican
O. H. Brewster	1872	Ouachita	Republican
Charles W. Lowell	1873–1874	Caddo	Republican
Louis A. Wiltz	1875	Orleans	Democratic
Michael Hahn	1875	St. Charles	Republican
E. D. Estilette	1875–1876	St. Landry	Democratic
Michael Hahn (Packard legislature)	1877	St. Charles	Republican
Louis Jean Bush	1877–1878	Orleans	Democratic
John Conway Moncure	1879–1880	Caddo	Democratic
Robert N. Ogden	1880–1884	Orleans	Democratic
Henry W. Ogden	1884–1888	Bossier	Democratic
Samuel P. Henry	1888–1892	Cameron	Democratic
George Washington Bolton	1892–1896	Rapides	Democratic
Samuel P. Henry	1896–1900	Cameron	Democratic
Jared Y. Sanders Sr.	1900–1904	St. Mary	Democratic
Robert H. Snyder	1904–1906	Tensas	Democratic
Joseph W. Hyams	1906–1908	West Baton Rouge	Democratic
Henry Garland Dupré	1908–1910	Orleans	Democratic
Lee Emmett Thomas	1912–1916	Caddo	Democratic
Hewitt Leonidas Bouanchaud	1916–1920	Pointe Coupee	Democratic
R. F. Walker	1920–1924	East Feliciana	Democratic
J. Stuart Douglas	1924–1926	Caddo	Democratic
William Clark Hughes	1926–1928	Bossier	Democratic
John B. Fournet	1928–1932	Jefferson Davis	Democratic
Allen J. Ellender	1932–1936	Terrebonne	Democratic
Lorris M. Wimberly	1936–1936	Bienville	Democratic
Ralph Norman Bauer	1940–1948	St. Mary	Democratic
Morris Lottinger Sr.	1948–1950	Terrebonne	Democratic
Lorris M. Wimberly	1950–1952	Bienville	Democratic
Clarence C. "Taddy" Aycock	1952–1956	St. Mary	Democratic
Lorris M. Wimberly	1956–1957	Bienville	Democratic
Robert Joseph "Bob" Angelle	1957–1960	St. Martin	Democratic
J. Thomas Jewell	1960–1964	Pointe Coupee	Democratic
Vail M. Delony	1964–1967	East Carroll	Democratic
John S. Garrett	1968–1972	Claiborne	Democratic
E. L. "Bubba" Henry	1972–1980	Jackson	Democratic
John J. Hainkel Jr.	1980–1984	Orleans	Democratic
John A. Alario Jr.	1984–1988	Jefferson	Democratic
Jimmy N. Dimos	1988–1992	Ouachita	Democratic
John A. Alario Jr.	1992–1996	Jefferson	Democratic
Huntington Blair "Hunt" Downer Jr.	1996–2000	Terrebonne	Democratic
Charles W. "Charlie" DeWitt Jr.	2000–2004	Rapides	Democratic
Joe Reece Salter	2004–2008	Sabine	Democratic
James Wayne "Jim" Tucker	2008–2012	Jefferson	Republican
Charles Edward "Chuck" Kleckley	2012–2016	Calcasieu	Republican
Taylor Francis Barras	2016–2020	Iberia	Republican
Clay Schexnayder	2020–2024	Ascension	Republican
Phillip DeVillier	2024–	St. Landry	Republican

== Speaker pro tempore ==
The speaker pro tempore is appointed in the same way as the speaker. The Speaker pro tempore acts as speaker in the absence of the speaker. If the chair is ever permanently vacated the speaker pro tempore acts as the temporary presiding officer until the House elects a new speaker. The Speaker pro tempore, although not officially a powerful position, generally serves as a major power player in the House. The House of Representatives created the position in 1972.

=== List of speakers pro tempore ===
Speaker pro tempore	Terms of office	Parish	Party
Kenneth J. Leithman	1972–1980	Jefferson	Democratic
Frank P. Simoneaux	1980–1982	East Baton Rouge	Democratic
Raymond Laborde	1982–1984	Avoyelles	Democratic
Joseph A. Delpit	1984–1988	East Baton Rouge	Democratic
Huntington Blair "Hunt" Downer	1988–1992	Terrebonne	Democratic
Sherman Copelin	1992–1996	Orleans	Democratic
Peppi Bruneau	1996–2004	Orleans	Republican
Sharon Weston Broome	2004–2005	East Baton Rouge	Democratic
Yvonne Dorsey-Colomb	2005–2008	East Baton Rouge	Democratic
Karen Carter Peterson	2008–2010	Orleans	Democratic
Joel Craig Robideaux	2010–2011	Lafayette	Independent
Joel Craig Robideaux	2011–2012	Lafayette	Republican
Walter John "Walt" Leger III	2012–2020	Orleans	Democratic
Tanner Magee	2020–2024	Terrebonne	Republican
Michael T. Johnson	2024–	Rapides	Republican

== See also ==
- Governor of Louisiana
- President of the Louisiana State Senate
- List of Louisiana state legislatures
