= Martin Duralde =

Louisiana colonial administrator (c. 1736–1822)

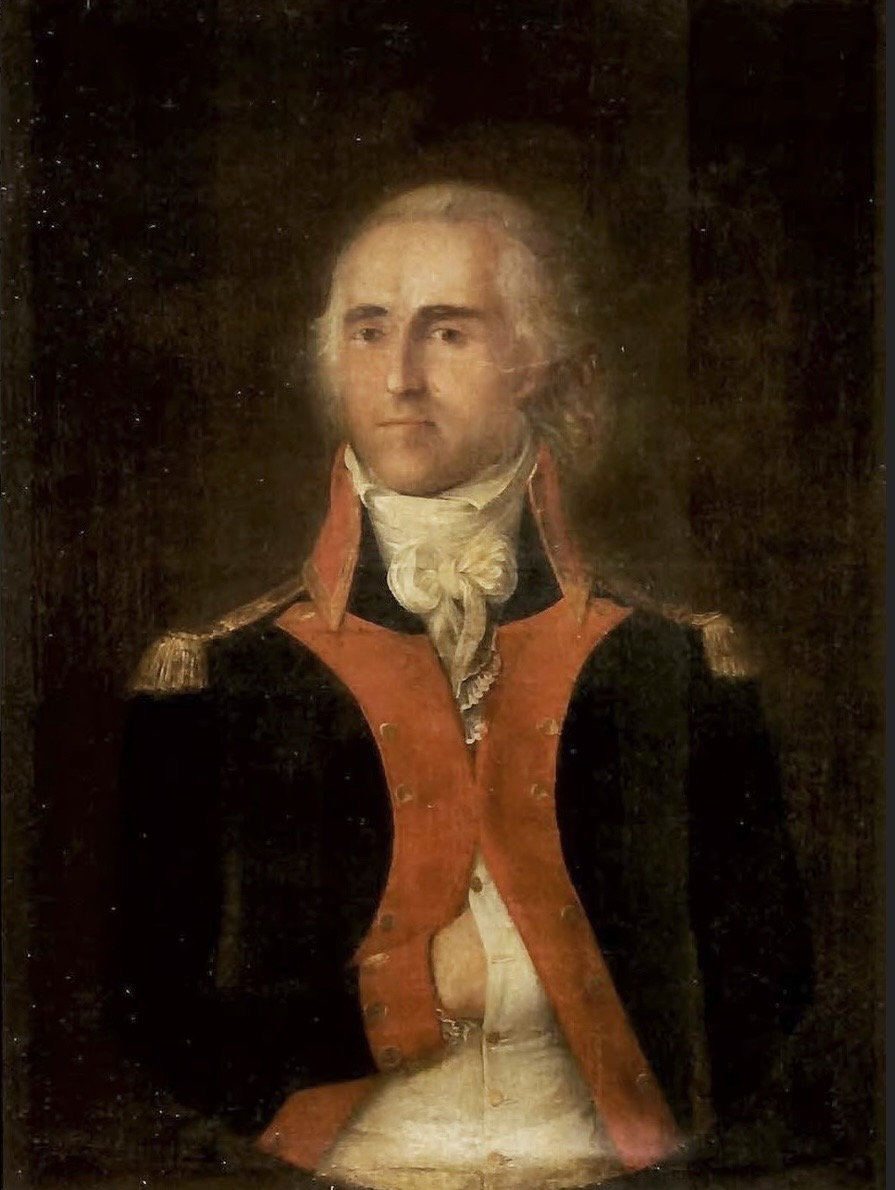
- Portrait by José Francisco Xavier de Salazar y Mendoza
- Born: c. 1736; Bayonne
- Died: November 21, 1822; Near Bayou Teche, Louisiana

Martin Molinoy Duralde (c. 1736 – November 21, 1822) was a native of France who came to North America with the fur trade, surveyed the original square for St. Louis, and served as a Spanish colonial administrator in Louisiana. He is an important source on the Indigenous people of Louisiana and their languages. He served as a Louisiana state legislator, and was considered an important figure in the Francophone community in the early years of the American era of Louisiana history. Three of his children married into notable American political families.

== Biography ==
Duralde was born in Bayonne in what is today France. His father, Pierre Duralde, was French, and his mother, Marie de Eligaza, was Spanish. He himself "spoke several languages" and enjoyed the study of dialects. He migrated to North America in 1767 and was involved in the establishment of St. Louis in what is now the U.S. state of Missouri, surveying the first town square. He worked in the fur trade, hunting and exporting peltry, and eventually moved from the Illinois country to Louisiana for business. He married his wife in 1776 in St. Louis; her name was Marie Josèphe Perrault, and she was a native of Quebec, her mother being Josèphe Bobé, and her father Louis Perrault being a merchant of Quebec.

By 1781 he owned a 1,423-acre (5.76 km^{2}) tract of land along the upper Bayou Teche. In 1795 governor Francisco Luis Héctor de Carondelet appointed Duralde commandant of the Opelousas post (Poste de Opelousas), which position he held until 1803. Construction on his house, now called Maison Stephanie, was completed in 1796. The bricks used in constructing the house were made on site from local clay, and bald cypress was used for the framing and the doors. The house stands near Bayou Teche, in present-day St. Martin Parish.

Duralde was interested in "the natural world and used geologic evidence and Native American oral histories to compare contemporary and historical landscapes and vegetation." He is a primary source on the language of the Atakapa people. Further, he is "virtually the only source" on the Chitimacha and Opelousa.

There is a surviving portrait of Duralde that was painted by Josef Salazar. Duralde served in the Louisiana State Legislature in 1812 as a representative from Attakapas. He died on his plantation in the Attakapas section of Louisiana in 1822. He specified in his will that some of his slaves were to be emancipated but most were auctioned off as part of the estate. His plantation was purchased by Charles Henri Lastrapes. Duralde was remembered in 1845 as having been "enlightened and highly respected."

== Descendants ==
The Duraldes had six children together: Martin Duralde Jr., Joseph Valmon Duralde, Celeste Duralde, Louise Duralde, Julie Duralde, and Clarice Duralde.

- Clarice Duralde: In 1806, one of his daughters, Clarisse, married the governor of Mississippi Territory and American Louisiana W. C. C. Claiborne.
- Martin Adrien Duralde: Duralde Jr. married Susan Hart Clay, a daughter of Henry Clay, in Lexington, Kentucky in April 1822.
- Julie Duralde: Henry Clay's brother John Clay married Julie Duralde.
- Celeste Duralde: Celeste Duralde married Valerien Allain, son of Pierre Augustin Allain and Manette du Plessis; George Eustis Sr. was one of their sons-in-law.
- Louise Duralde: Louise married Pierre Soniat, also known as Gui Joseph Soniat du Fossat, son of the Chevalier Gui de Saunhac and Françoise Claudine Dreux.
- Joseph Valmon Duralde: Known as Col. J. V. Duralde, he married Gertrude de Vahamonde, daughter of a Spanish officer stationed at Baton Rouge, José Vázquez Bahamonde (also spelled Josef, Baamonde, Vaamonde, Vahamonde), who was possibly born 1748 in Galicia.

Susan Hart Clay Duralde died in 1825. Her children went to live with their grandparents Henry and Lucretia Clay at Ashland in Kentucky. The Clays also helped raise William Charles Cole Claiborne II, son of Clarisse Duralde Claiborne and the governor; Claiborne II at least spent summers at Ashland.

Martin Adrien Duralde, usually called Martin Duralde Jr. in American newspapers, was appointed to be U.S. marshal of New Orleans in 1811. In October 1822 he paid a call at Andrew Jackson's Hermitage but Jackson was away on business. Martin Duralde Jr. was a candidate for governor of Louisiana in 1830. Henry Clay stayed at Duralde Jr. house's "three miles below" New Orleans for several months in 1831. Duralde was appointed to a patronage position in 1841. Duralde died on the return trip from the Mexican-American War, where he had worked as some kind of merchant to the troops; the entire ship caught yellow fever, except for one young boy, possibly an enslaved cabin boy, and Duralde was found dying beside the dead captain after the ship drifted aground near New Orleans.

Martin Duralde III was involved in a bloodless duel with Dr. Mosby of Virginia in 1841 in Cincinnati, Ohio. The humorous and charming journal of Martin Duralde III, described as a "tubercular gambler," written during an 1846 tour of Virginia's therapeutic hot springs, is held in the special collections of the Virginia State Library. Martin Duralde III died in Philadelphia later that year.

Henry C. Duralde, Martin III's brother, went to California for the gold rush but died by drowning after falling overboard off the steamer Yuba on the Sacramento River in 1850.

J. V. Duralde Jr. was once a candidate for Louisiana state office on the Know Nothing ticket and was president of the Grosse Tete and Opelousas Railroad.

== Sources ==
- Arthur, Stanley C.; Kernion, George Campbell Huchet de (1977) [1931]. Old Families of Louisiana. Louisiana Classics Series Vol. 7. Baton Rouge: Claitor's Publishing Division. FHL 2351576.
