= Charles H. Morrison =

American politician (1820–1876)

Speaker of the Louisiana House of Representatives
- In office 1860–1860
- Preceded by: William W. Pugh
- Succeeded by: Adolphus Olivier

Personal details
- Born: c. 1820
- Died: October 18, 1876 Delhi, Louisiana
- Party: Democratic

Charles H. Morrison (died October 17, 1876 at age 56) was an American public official, lawyer, and state legislator in Louisiana who served as the 23rd speaker of the Louisiana House of Representatives in 1860. He represented Ouachita Parish in the Louisiana House of Representatives from 1860 to 1861 as part of the Democratic Party.

He served as deputy sheriff, sheriff, recorder, and register of lands. He was married to Fannie Farmer Morrison and they had a son.

He was Speaker as the Civil War broke out. He helped organize and led Confederate Army soldiers in the Civil War. After the war he litigated to regain property he owned before the war.
