= Mansfield, Louisiana =

- City
- City of Mansfield
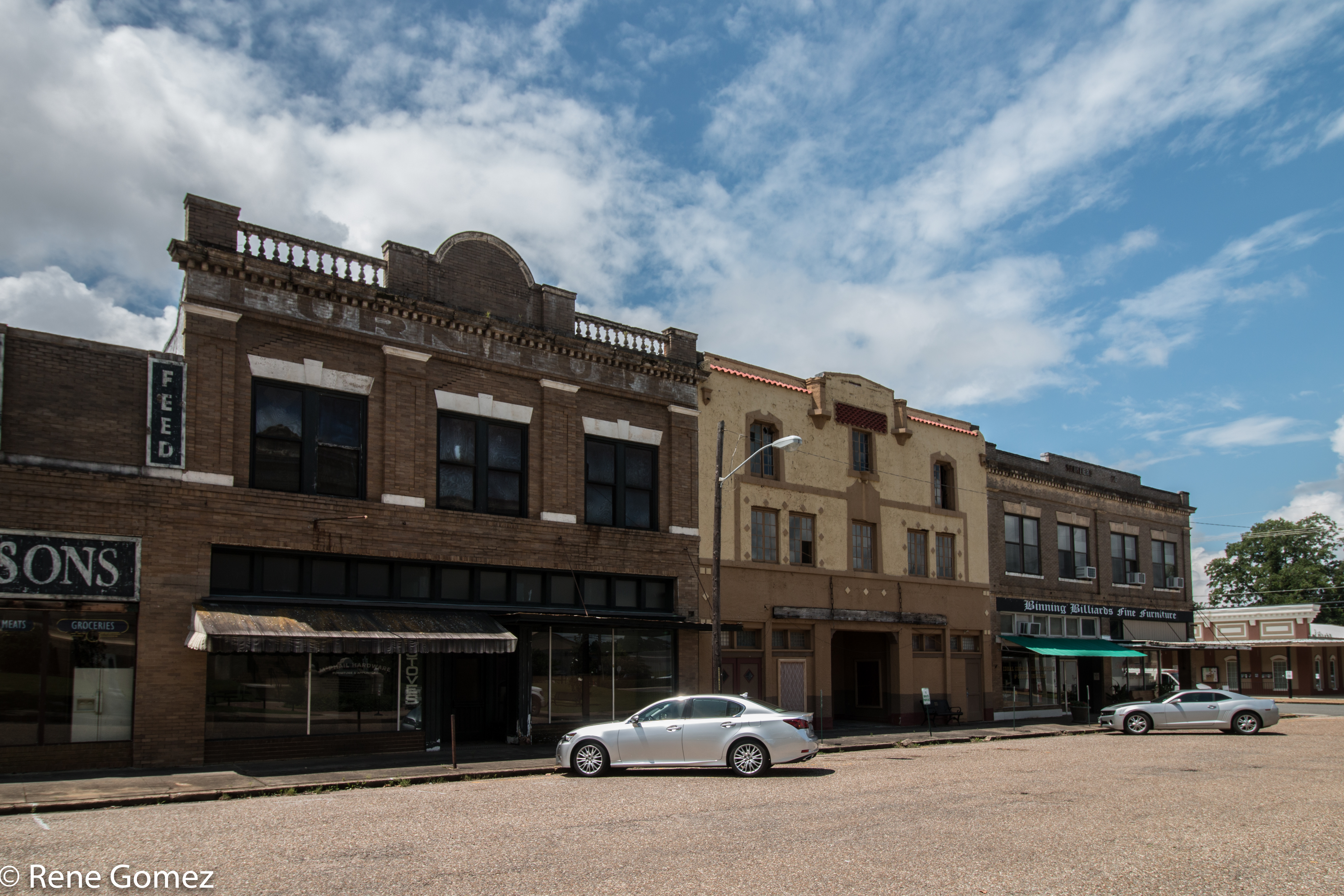
- Downtown Mansfield

- Location of Mansfield in De Soto Parish, Louisiana.

- Location within Louisiana Location within the United States
- Coordinates: 32°01′58″N 93°42′09″W
- Country: United States
- States: Louisiana
- Parish: DeSoto

Government
  - Mayor: Thomas Jones (D) (began first term July 1, 2022)

Area
  - Total: 3.66 sq mi (9.48 km^{2})
  - Land: 3.65 sq mi (9.46 km^{2})
  - Water: 0.0077 sq mi (0.02 km^{2})

Population (2020)
  - Total: 4,714
  - Density: 1,290.7/sq mi (498.33/km^{2})
- Time zone: UTC-6 (CST)
  - Summer (DST): UTC-5 (CDT)
- ZIP code: 71052
- Area code: 318
- FIPS code: 22-48365
- Website: cityofmansfield.net

Mansfield is a small city in and the parish seat of DeSoto Parish, Louisiana, United States. Mansfield is part of the Shreveport–Bossier City metropolitan statistical area, with a 2020 population of 4,714.

== Geography ==
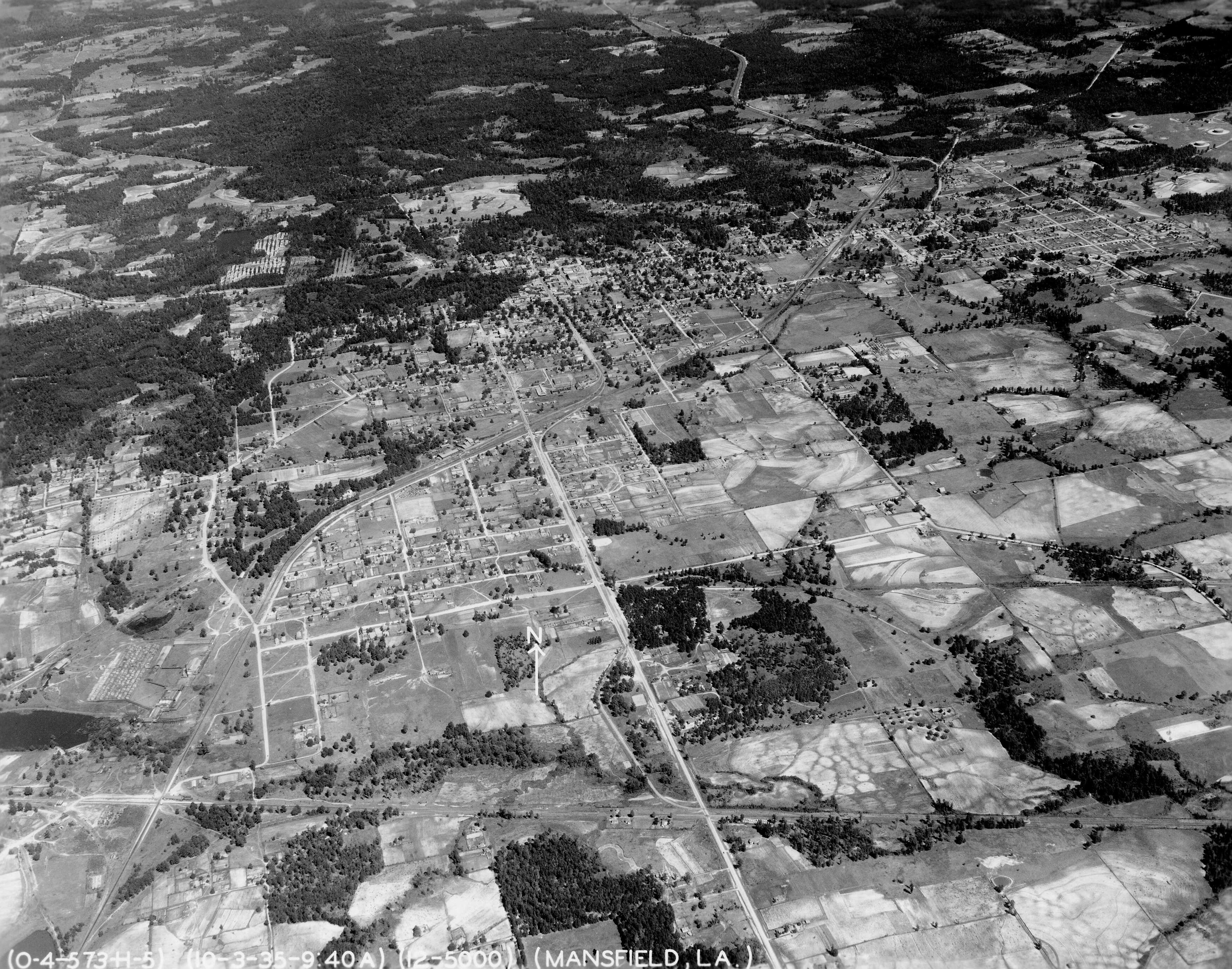
Mansfield in 1935

According to the United States Census Bureau, the city has a total area of 3.7 square miles (9.6 km^{2}), all land.

=== Climate ===
Climate data for Mansfield, LA (1991–2020 normals, coordinates:32.0711°N 93.7589°W)
Month	Jan	Feb	Mar	Apr	May	Jun	Jul	Aug	Sep	Oct	Nov	Dec	Year
Mean daily maximum °F (°C)	57.4 (14.1)	62.3 (16.8)	70.4 (21.3)	76.1 (24.5)	83.4 (28.6)	90.3 (32.4)	93.4 (34.1)	93.3 (34.1)	88.0 (31.1)	78.5 (25.8)	67.5 (19.7)	59.6 (15.3)	76.7 (24.8)
Daily mean °F (°C)	46.7 (8.2)	51.3 (10.7)	58.1 (14.5)	64.4 (18.0)	72.6 (22.6)	80.0 (26.7)	82.7 (28.2)	82.7 (28.2)	76.3 (24.6)	66.7 (19.3)	55.7 (13.2)	48.6 (9.2)	65.5 (18.6)
Mean daily minimum °F (°C)	36.0 (2.2)	40.4 (4.7)	45.7 (7.6)	52.7 (11.5)	61.8 (16.6)	69.7 (20.9)	72.1 (22.3)	72.0 (22.2)	64.5 (18.1)	54.9 (12.7)	43.8 (6.6)	37.6 (3.1)	54.3 (12.4)
Average precipitation inches (mm)	4.93 (125)	5.20 (132)	5.48 (139)	5.17 (131)	4.57 (116)	4.33 (110)	2.55 (65)	3.52 (89)	3.19 (81)	4.95 (126)	4.26 (108)	5.27 (134)	53.42 (1,356)
Average snowfall inches (cm)	0.0 (0.0)	0.1 (0.25)	0.0 (0.0)	0.0 (0.0)	0.0 (0.0)	0.0 (0.0)	0.0 (0.0)	0.0 (0.0)	0.0 (0.0)	0.0 (0.0)	0.0 (0.0)	0.0 (0.0)	0.1 (0.25)
Average precipitation days (≥ 0.01 in)	8.5	8.1	7.9	6.1	6.3	8.0	6.0	5.5	6.0	5.5	6.5	8.0	82.4
Average snowy days (≥ 0.01 in)	0.1	0.2	0.0	0.0	0.0	0.0	0.0	0.0	0.0	0.0	0.0	0.0	0.3
Source: NOAA

== Demographics ==
Historical population
Census	Pop.	Note	%±
1870	813		—
1880	770		−5.3%
1890	908		17.9%
1900	847		−6.7%
1910	1,799		112.4%
1920	2,564		42.5%
1930	3,837		49.6%
1940	4,065		5.9%
1950	4,440		9.2%
1960	5,839		31.5%
1970	6,432		10.2%
1980	6,485		0.8%
1990	5,389		−16.9%
2000	5,582		3.6%
2010	5,001		−10.4%
2020	4,714		−5.7%
2025 (est.)	4,475	▼	−5.1%
U.S. Decennial Census

=== 2020 census ===
As of the 2020 census, Mansfield had a population of 4,714. The median age was 38.2 years. 25.2% of residents were under the age of 18 and 17.9% of residents were 65 years of age or older. For every 100 females there were 83.6 males, and for every 100 females age 18 and over there were 76.8 males age 18 and over.

99.3% of residents lived in urban areas, while 0.7% lived in rural areas.

There were 1,857 households in Mansfield, of which 35.6% had children under the age of 18 living in them. Of all households, 21.4% were married-couple households, 19.8% were households with a male householder and no spouse or partner present, and 53.0% were households with a female householder and no spouse or partner present. About 33.4% of all households were made up of individuals and 14.0% had someone living alone who was 65 years of age or older.

There were 1,165 families residing in the city.

There were 2,153 housing units, of which 13.7% were vacant. The homeowner vacancy rate was 2.3% and the rental vacancy rate was 7.2%.

Mansfield racial composition as of 2020
Race	Number	Percentage
White (non-Hispanic)	727	15.42%
Black or African American (non-Hispanic)	3,691	78.3%
Native American	15	0.32%
Asian	28	0.59%
Other/Mixed	122	2.59%
Hispanic or Latino	131	2.78%

== Notable people ==
- Sylura Barron (1900-1997), first African-American woman delegate to a national political convention (1948)
- Country Jim Bledsoe (1930-1988), blues guitarist and singer
- Vida Blue, baseball player
- Riemer Calhoun (1909-1994), state senator from DeSoto and Caddo parishes from 1944 to 1952
- Joe T. Cawthorn (1911-1967), lawyer affiliated with Long faction
- Charles Wheaton Elam (1866–1917), state representative from 1892 to 1896
- Joseph Barton Elam, Sr. (1821–1885), state representative, U.S. representative
- Walter T. Griffith (1911-1966), U.S. Navy submarine commander during World War II
- Jeff Hall, member of the Louisiana House for District 26 since 2015
- Charles Johnson (born 1956), football player
- Jeter Jones, blues musician
- Albert Lewis NFL football player
- Joshua Logan, director, producer, playwright and screenwriter
- Sidney Maiden (1923-1970), country blues musician, singer and harmonica player
- Sammy Joe Odom (1941–2001), professional football player.
- Arthur T. Prescott (1863-1942), founding president of Louisiana Tech University
- Mack Charles Reynolds (1935–1991), professional football player
- C. O. Simpkins (1925–2019), African-American state representative, and civil rights activist in Shreveport
- Ocie Lee Smith was an American singer

== Gallery ==
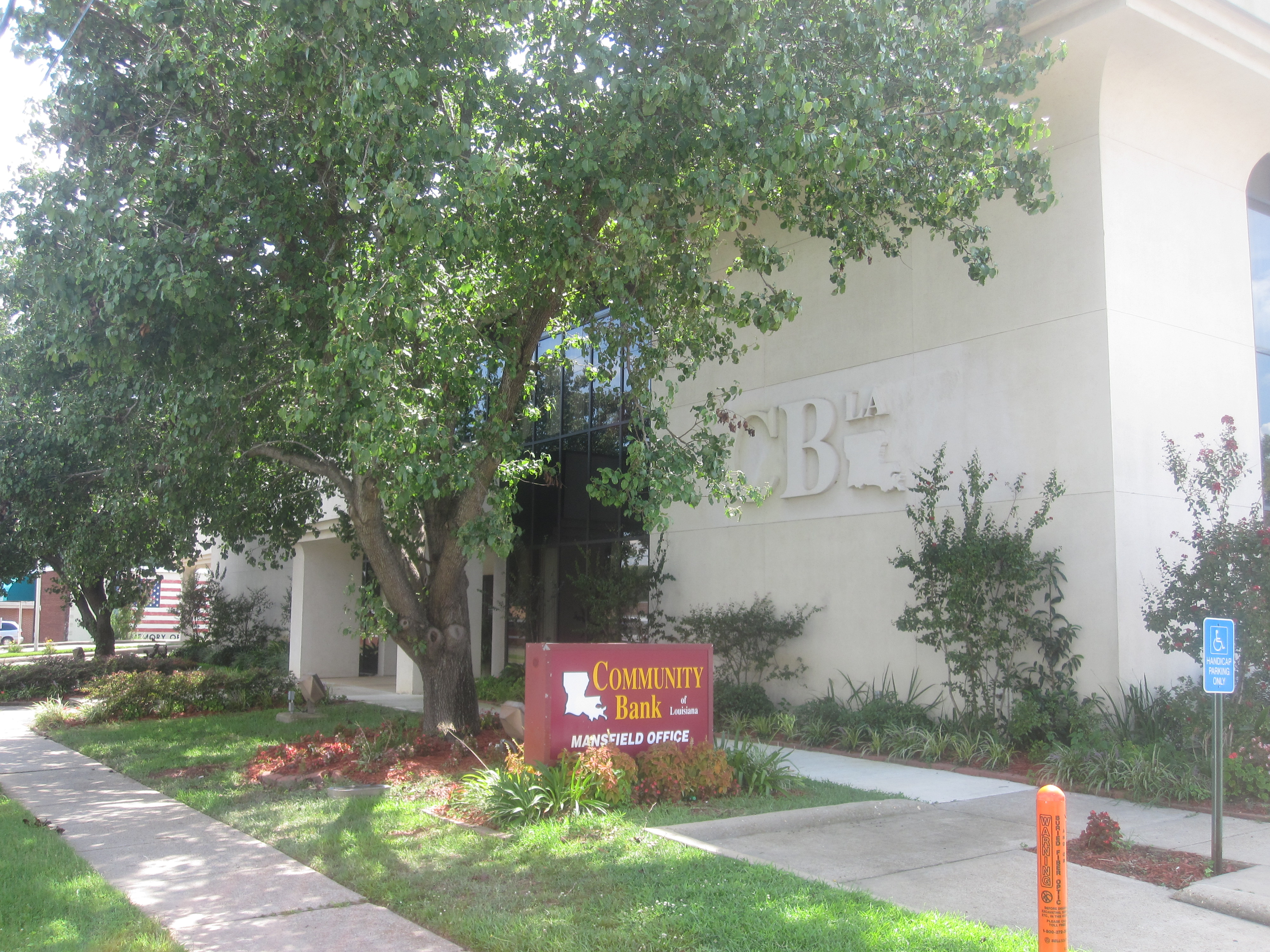
Community Bank of Louisiana in Mansfield

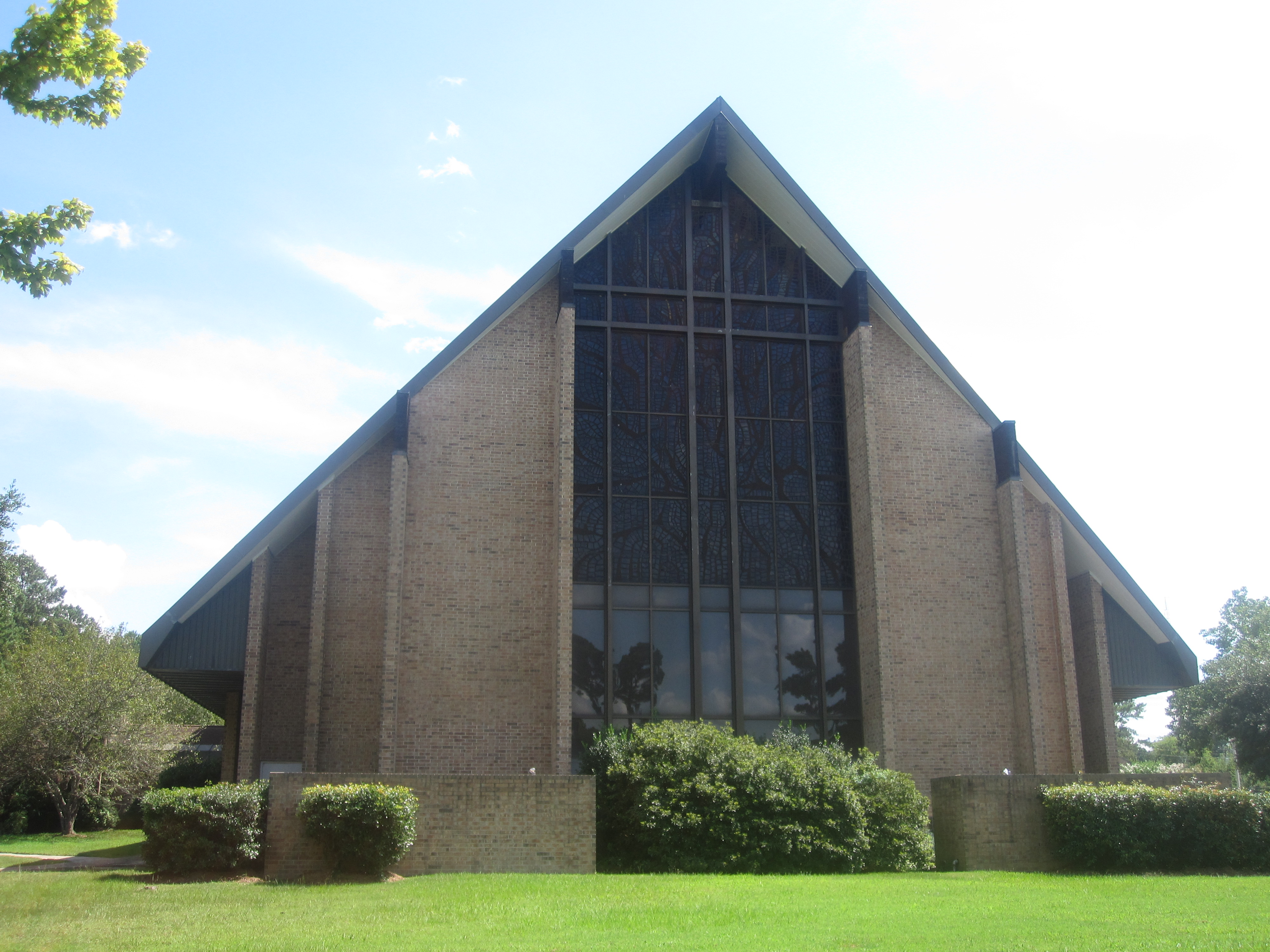
The First Baptist Church of Mansfield is located at 1710 McArthur Drive (U.S. Highway 84)

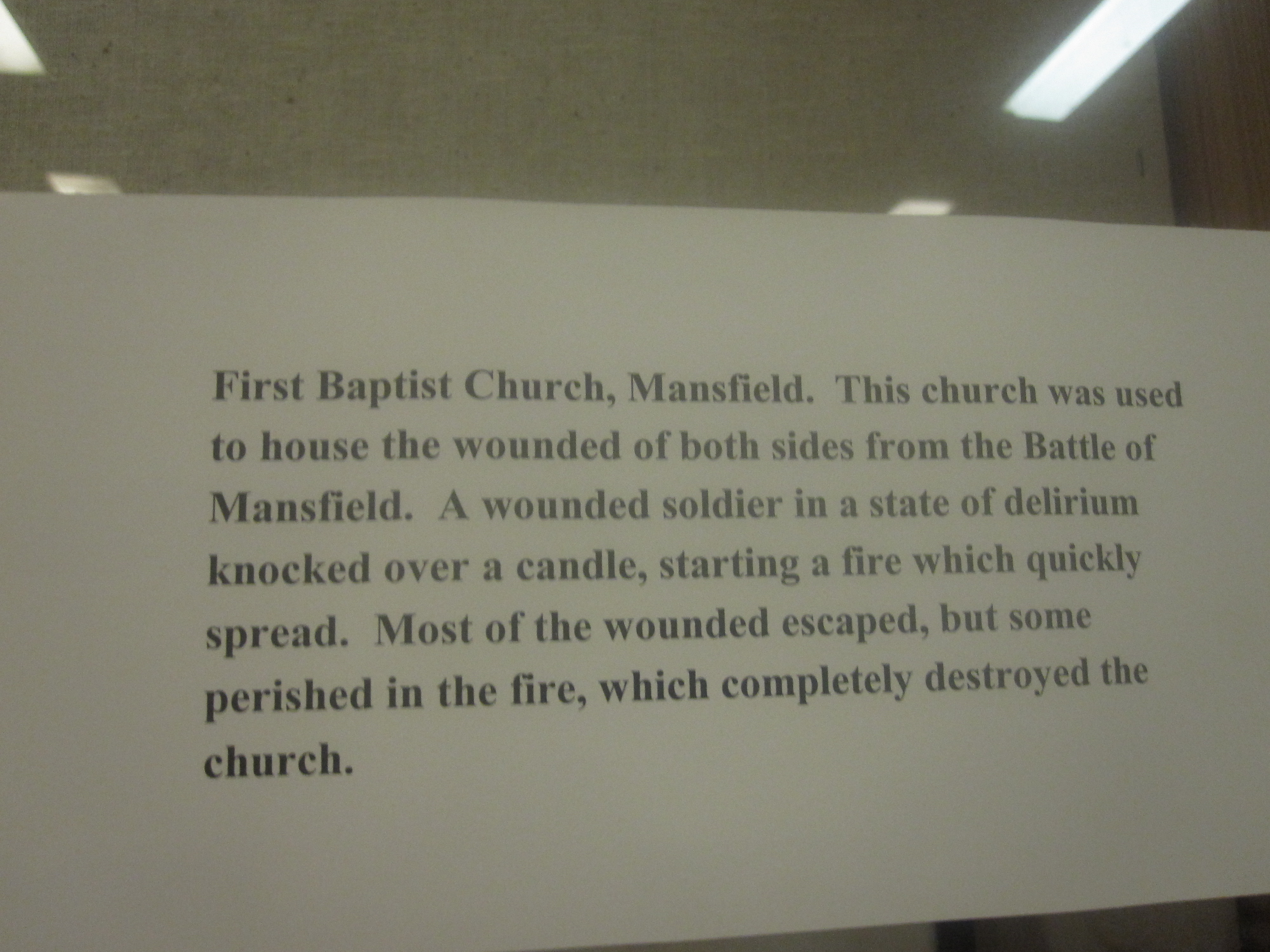
Historical marker at Mansfield State Historic Site referring to role of First Baptist Church during the battle of Mansfield
