= Adolphus Olivier =

Confederate politician

Speaker of the Louisiana House of Representatives
- Preceded by: Charles H. Morrison
- Succeeded by: Joseph Barton Elam

Personal details
- Born: October 25, 1833
- Party: Democratic

Adolphus Pierre Olivier was an American state legislator in Louisiana who served as the 24th speaker of the Louisiana House of Representatives from 1861 to 1863 for the Confederate States of America. He was a representative in the Louisiana House of Representatives as part of the Democratic Party.

He was an officer in the state militia. He spoke at the funeral of Charles Dreux.
