= Duncan Cage =

American politician (died 1885)

Duncan S. Cage

Speaker of the Louisiana House of Representatives
- Preceded by: Simeon Belden
- Succeeded by: Charles W. Lowell

Personal details
- Born: Natchitoches, Louisiana

Duncan S. Cage (died 1885 at age 60) was a politician in Louisiana. He served as Speaker of the Louisiana House of Representatives. He was a signatory to an act for the indentured servitude of orphans. He served in the Louisiana House in 1865 and 1866.

He was born in Mississippi. Harry Cage was his father and he had several prominent family members. He became a sugar planter in Terrebonne Parish. He raised a company during the Civil War and became a Colonel in the Confederate Army before taking sick during the Siege of Vicksburg when his regiment was captured. He then served on General Kirby Smith's staff.

He married and had 4 sons and 3 daughters. His son Hugh C Cage was lawyer and Citizens' League member who became a Democratic Party politician and served in the Louisiana Senate.
