= Country Jim Bledsoe =

American blues singer and songwriter (1930–1988)

Country Jim Bledsoe (May 28, 1930 – October 15, 1988) was a Louisiana blues singer, songwriter, and guitarist who recorded for several independent labels in the late 1940s and early 1950s while based in Shreveport, Louisiana.

== Biography ==
James Bledsoe was born in Mansfield, Louisiana, and by the late 1940s had moved to Shreveport where he began performing. In 1949 he made his recording debut with two recordings for Tillman Franks and Webb Pierce which were subsequently issued under the pseudonym "Hot Rod Happy" on their local Pacemaker label. Bledsoe's finger-picked, down-home blues guitar recalled an earlier era, and a style that was similar to that of John Lee Hooker and Melvin "Lil' Son" Jackson. In early 1950 Bledsoe recorded eight sides with two alternate takes for Imperial Records, including "Old River Blues" and "Good Lookin' Woman." He then signed with Specialty Records and recorded 20 titles for the label in 1951/1952 but none were initially released, although several appeared on compilation albums years later.

Bledsoe signed a recording contract with Don Robey of Peacock Records in late 1951, but no known sessions were produced. He moved to Houston the following year and after several years performing around the city, including at Robey's Bronze Peacock Dinner Club, retired from music in the late 1950s.

Country Jim Bledsoe died of lung cancer on October 19, 1988, in Houston.
