= Preston W. Farrar =

American lawyer and politician

17th Speaker of the Louisiana House of Representatives

Member of the Louisiana House of Representatives
- In office 1847 – March 7, 1850

Member of the Louisiana House of Representatives
- In office 1847 – March 7, 1850

Member of the Mississippi Senate from the Wilkinson County district
- In office 1836–1837

Member of the Mississippi House of Representatives from the Wilkinson County district
- In office 1838–1841

Personal details
- Born: Preston Withers Farrar; 1805 or 1806 Lexington, Kentucky, US
- Died: March 7, 1850 (aged 44) Baton Rouge, Louisiana, US
- Relations: Abram M. Scott (father-in-law)
- Education: Transylvania University

Preston Withers Farrar (1805 or 1806 – March 7, 1850) was an American lawyer and politician. A Whig, he was the Speaker of the Louisiana House of Representatives from 1848 to his death in 1850. He also served in both houses of the Mississippi Legislature.

== Biography ==
Farrar was born in 1805 or 1806, in Lexington, Kentucky. He had a brother, Daniel Foster Farrar (died 1841). He graduated from Transylvania University. Farrar moved to the state of Mississippi in 1827, where he began practicing law in Woodville. In March 1833, he married Eliza Scott, the only daughter of Mississippi Governor Abram M. Scott. In 1837, following Abram's death, he and Eliza took control over half of his plantation and enslaved people in Rapides Parish, Louisiana. In 1838, they mortgaged the property and 43 enslaved people to obtain a loan of $29,000, which Farrar then used to pay off a $24,443 debt he owed to a New Orleans firm. When the Farrars could not repay a majority of the $29,000 loan the bank threatened to foreclose on the plantation property.

Farrar was a member of the Whig Party. In the 1836 and 1837 sessions, Farrar represented Wilkinson County in the Mississippi House of Representatives. He represented the same county in the Mississippi State Senate from 1838 to 1841. In 1839, Farrar experienced bank losses and moved to New Orleans, Louisiana.

In 1847, Farrar served on the first board of the University of Louisiana. In 1847, he served as Speaker of the Louisiana House of Representatives. He was again elected Speaker for the 1848 session, and the 1850 session, during the latter of which the state capital moved from New Orleans to Baton Rouge.

Farrar died on March 7, 1850, aged 44, in Baton Rouge, Louisiana.
