= Mt. Olivet Episcopal Church and Cemetery =

Historic church in Louisiana, United States

- U.S. National Register of Historic Places
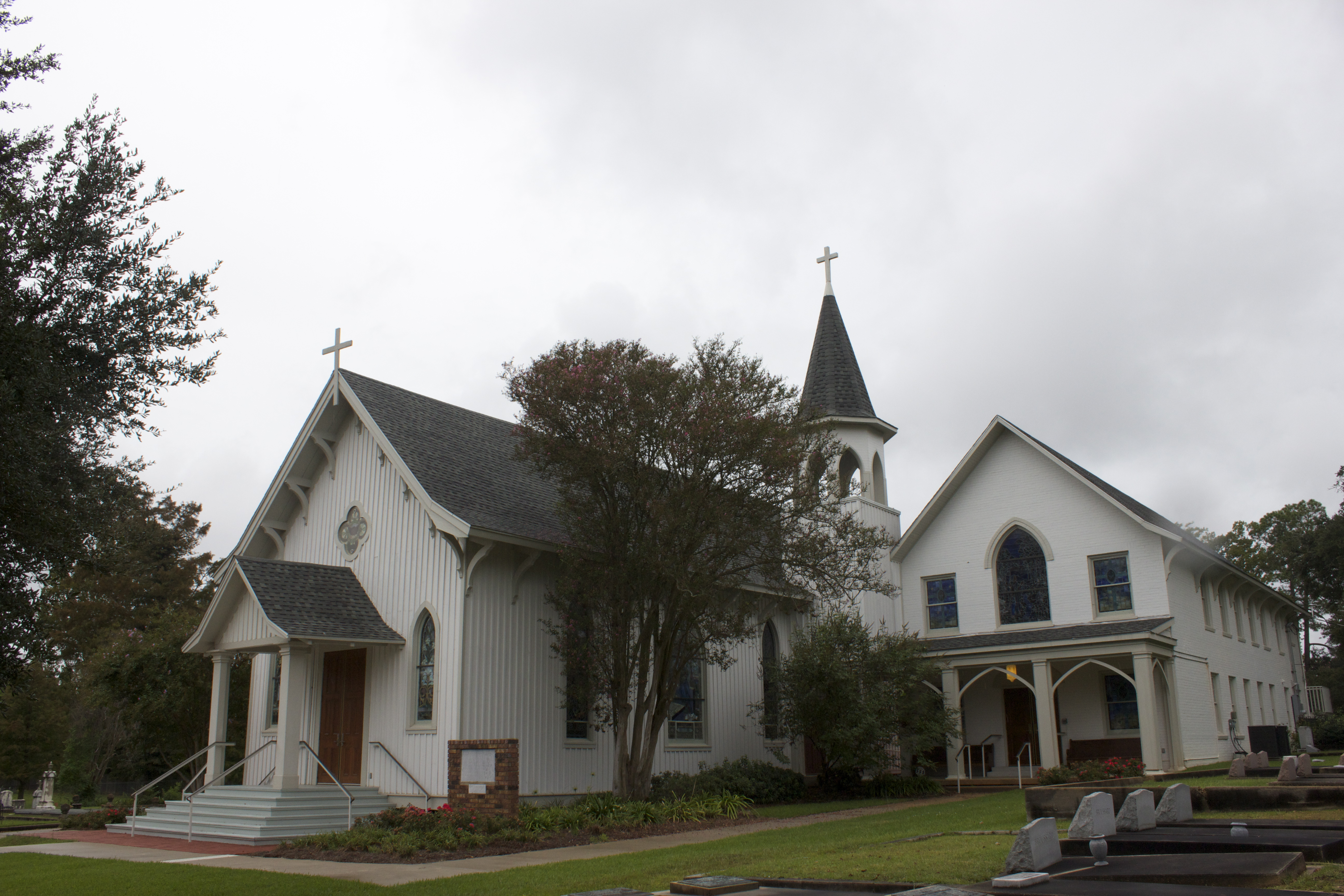

- Location within Louisiana Location within the United States
- Location: 335 Main Street, Pineville, Rapides Parish, Louisiana
- Coordinates: 31°19′5″N 92°26′22″W
- Area: 5.3 acres (2.1 ha)
- Built: 1858
- Architect: Upjohn, Richard; et al.
- Architectural style: Gothic Revival
- NRHP reference No.: 00000718
- Added to NRHP: June 22, 2000

Mt. Olivet Episcopal Church and Cemetery is an historic Carpenter Gothic style Episcopal Church building and its adjoining cemetery located at 335 Main Street in Pineville, Louisiana, United States.

It was added to the National Register of Historic Places on June 22, 2000. Mt. Olivet is no longer a parish church and is now Mount Olivet Chapel. Its parish hall is now the Diocesan House of the Episcopal Diocese of Western Louisiana.

== Notable interments ==
- George Washington Bolton (1841–1931), state politician and banker
- Henry E. Hardtner (1870–1935), businessman and conservationist
- Thomas Overton Moore (1804–1876), Louisiana Governor
- John H. Overton (1875–1948), U.S. Representative and Senator
