= Stephen A. Hopkins =

American politician (d. 1815)

Speaker of the Louisiana House of Representatives
- In office 1813–1814
- Preceded by: Pierre Bauchet St. Martin
- Succeeded by: Magloire Guichard

Personal details
- Died: October 21, 1815 Thibodaux, Louisiana
- Party: Democratic-Republican

Stephen A. Hopkins (d. October 21, 1815) was an American politician of Louisiana. He was a lawyer by trade, and seems to have been involved in the founding of Donaldsville, Louisiana. He married into an influential Acadian family. He served as the second Speaker of the Louisiana House of Representatives, a presidential elector from Louisiana, and a brigadier general of Louisiana militia organized in anticipation of the British attack on New Orleans during the War of 1812. Hopkins was involved in a duel with a former United States Attorney in 1810. He was shot and killed in Donaldsonville, previously known as LaFourche (being at the fork of the Mississippi River and the Riviere des Chetimaches) in 1815.

== Life and career ==
He was originally from New England, the son of Huldah Brown and David Hopkins of Bennington, Vermont. He owned two slaves at the time of the 1810 U.S. census. On September 25, 1810, he dueled former U.S. attorney for the District of Louisiana Philip Grymes at Manchac, West Florida, and Grymes took a bullet through the chest but lived. Circa 1812 Hopkins was "agent on the premises" for William Donaldson, founder of Donaldsonville, Louisiana. He was a presidential elector from Louisiana in 1812, with Julien Poydras, and Philemon Thomas, all for James Madison. On September 28, 1813, he married Marie Arthémise Landry, daughter of Joseph Landry, a leader of the Acadian exiles who had migrated from Nova Scotia to Louisiana.

He was the second speaker of the Louisiana House of Representatives, a position he held from 1813 to 1814. He represented Acadia Parish in Louisiana in 1812 and 1814, with no meetings of the legislature in 1813 due to the War of 1812. He was a brigadier general of the 2nd brigade of Louisiana militia, derived from the populations of St. James Parish and Ascension Parish, from December 22, 1814 to March 20, 1815, including at the time of the Battle of New Orleans, based at the "Post on the Lafourche."

He was shot and killed near the Ascension Parish Courthouse in Donaldsonville, previously known as LaFourche, the location of the fork (LaFourche) of the Mississippi River and the Riviere des Chetimaches on October 21, 1815, by Pierre Valet, a man whom he had sued and won a judgment against. Little is known about Valet; he had acquired some land from William Donaldson, founder of Donaldsonville, Louisiana, prior to the latter's death in 1813.

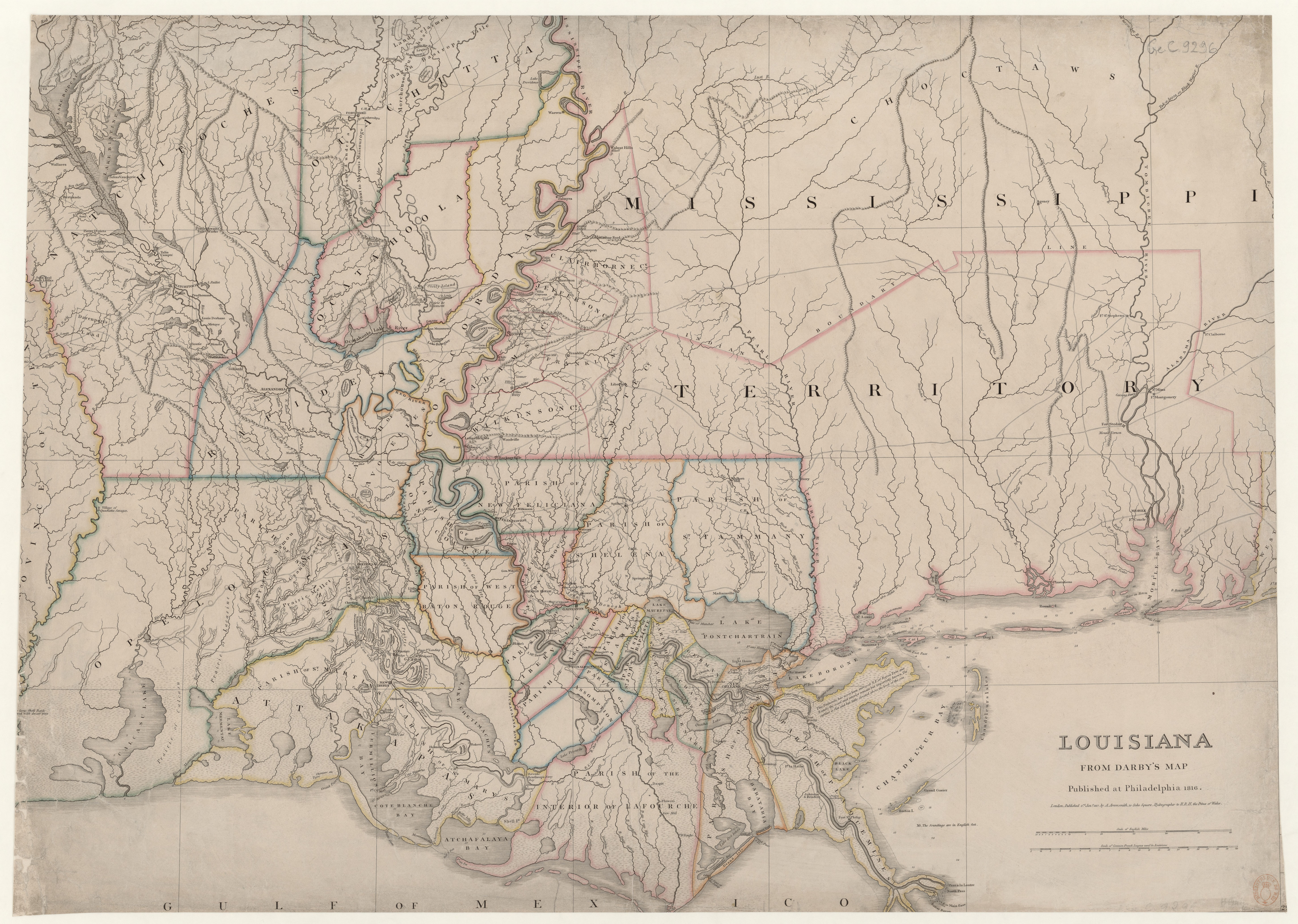
Darby's map of Louisiana (1816)

Hopkins was buried in Ascension Catholic Cemetery in Donaldsonville, Louisiana.

Hopkins was a "subscriber" to William Darby's geography of Louisiana, published 1816.

== Sources ==
- Beauchamp, Michael Kelly (December 2009). Instruments of Empire: Colonial Elites and U.S. Governance in Early National Louisiana, 1803–1820 (Ph.D. History). College Station, Texas: Texas A&M University. hdl:1969.1/ETD-TAMU-2009-12-7403.
- Boudreaux, Sybil Ann (May 1983). The First Minute Book of the Supreme Court of the State of Louisiana 1813 to May, 1818: An Annotated Edition (M.A. History). University of New Orleans. 1683.
- Marchand, Sidney A. (1943). Acadian Exiles in the Golden Coast of Louisiana: Ascension and St. James Parishes. Donaldsonville, Louisiana: n.pub. LCCN 43011818. OCLC 1074433.
