= Henry E. Hardtner =

American politician (1870–1935)

Louisiana State Senator for Caldwell, Grant, La Salle, and Winn parishes
- In office 1924–1928
- Preceded by: Thomas B. Gilbert, Sr.
- Succeeded by: Oscar K. Allen

Louisiana State Representative from La Salle Parish
- In office 1910–1912
- Preceded by: First legislator from La Salle Parish
- Succeeded by: T.J. Kendrick

Personal details
- Born: September 10, 1870 Pineville, Rapides Parish; Louisiana
- Died: August 7, 1935 (aged 64) Highway accident en route to Baton Rouge
- Resting place: Mt. Olivet Cemetery in Pineville, Louisiana
- Party: Republican-turned-Democrat
- Spouse: Juliet Doerr Hardtner
- Children: Violet Urania Hardtner Howell Juliet Emily Hardtner Henrietta H. Hutchinson
- Parent(s): E.J. and Emma Schraeder Hardtner
- Education: Soule Business College
- Occupation: Businessman

Henry Ernest Hardtner (September 10, 1870 – August 7, 1935) was a Louisiana businessman and conservationist regarded as "the father of forestry in the South." He founded and named the town of Urania in La Salle Parish and served single terms as a Democrat in both houses of the Louisiana State Legislature. In 1900 he was the Republican candidate for Louisiana's 5th congressional district, losing to future U.S. Senator Joseph E. Ransdell of Lake Providence in East Carroll Parish.

== Early years ==
Hardtner was born to E. J. Hardtner and the former Emma Schraeder, both of German ancestry, in Pineville, located across the Red River from the larger Alexandria, Louisiana. The elder Hardtner emigrated from Germany in 1865 and was a shoemaker by trade. E.J. Hardtner and J.M. Nugent built a small sawmill ten miles (16 km) north of Alexandria after the Missouri Pacific Railroad built a line through the virgin pine forest between Alexandria and Monroe to the north. Henry Hardtner worked in his father's business and later studied bookkeeping at Soule Business College in New Orleans.

Hardtner began operating sawmills north of Alexandria, one of which was located south of Olla in La Salle Parish on the Iron Mountain Railroad. Hardtner renamed the location "Urania," meaning "heavenly," because of the beauty of the natural terrain there. In 1898, he reorganized as the Urania Lumber Company and purchased land for some $5 per acre to the north in Caldwell Parish. He built a logging railroad, the Natchez, Urania and Ruston, but it was never completed beyond fourteen miles (23 km). As the nominal president of a railroad, Hardtner enjoyed pass privileges on other lines, a helpful asset for the travels stemming from his business and conservation commitments/

In addition to his forestry endeavors, Hardtner was a vestryman in the St. James Episcopal Church in Alexandria, and was active in the Masonic lodge and the Good Roads Association, a transportation lobbying group active in several states.

== Forestry conservationist ==
Hardtner's younger brother, Quintin Theodore Hardtner, known as Quincy Hardtner (January 31, 1878 – August 21, 1952, Shreveport, Louisiana), managed the mill itself, while Henry devoted his time to purchasing land and studying the principles of timber growth and harvesting. Hardtner added more land in Winn Parish. He learned the advantage of producing a second crop of trees after the virgin timber was harvested. He told his lumbermen to avoid cutting smaller trees in order to allow them to grow to full size. He ordered that four seed trees per acre be left intact for natural reproduction. He developed a rudimentary fire protection system for his lands. He fenced young longleaf pines to protect them from wild hogs. His vision of reforestation was hence far in advance of the later embodiment of the standard practices of forestry. Hardtner said

I was born in the forests and have had close association with them since childhood. What I know of them cannot be learned in schools or colleges. To me, they are as human [beings], and I know the trees as I try to know men.

As a crusader for forestry causes, Hardtner, before his own years as a legislator, worked in 1904 for passage of Louisiana Act 113, which established a state department of forestry. The law also authorized a program to prevent forest fires, proposed the reforestation of barren lands, and established the study of forestry in public schools. The bill was drafted by H. H. White, an attorney from Alexandria, and introduced in the legislature by State Representative Swords Lee of Grant Parish, who was also in the timber business.

Coincidentally, Hardtner's ideas were gaining national acceptance, as U.S. President Theodore Roosevelt called a White House Conservation Conference of Governors in 1908. Governor Newton C. Blanchard of Louisiana attended though his term expired the day before the meeting began. Joining Blanchard at the conference were Hardtner and a business associate and friend, William Edenborn of Winn Parish, who owned a railroad linking Shreveport with New Orleans. Louisiana became the first state to establish a commission on the conservation of natural resources. Blanchard's successor, Jared Y. Sanders, Sr., signed the bill on July 2, 1908, and named Hardtner chairman of the seven-member state commission. Hardtner said that he worked hard to make the commission a success. Sanders appointed Hardtner to the board even though Hardtner had not supported Sanders in the 1908 gubernatorial election.

Hardtner developed contacts with the Yale University School of Forestry and the United States Forest Service. In 1917, he invited Yale forestry professor Herman Haupt Chapman (1874–1963) to bring students to Louisiana for training on Urania Lumber Company lands. The visits resumed after World War I and continued to at least 1939. Hardtner established a permanent campsite for the students, who lived in tents during their field training. The students measured timber growth, drew topographic maps, and plotted logging railroads. In 1915, the United States Forest Service had begun conducting experiments on Hardtner company lands involving prescribed burning, forest thinning, and the growth rate of longleaf pine trees.

Hardtner insisted on the merits of natural reproduction and never resorted to seeding and planting his properties. He explained that his

actual forestry work commenced in 1908 ... I immediately made many trips to forestry regions and attended forestry conventions in order to acquire some knowledge of the subject. I found little on which to base a foundation for forestry and decided that there was no royal road to forestry and that I must blaze my own trail.

The conservation commission issued a six-point program:

- (1) Immediate protection of cutover pine lands from fire
- (2) prevention of all forms of waste in logging
- (3) establishment of state forest reserves from gifts and by purchases
- (4) correction of the system of taxation on young growing timber
- (5) initiation of a tax on mature timber when cut, with proceeds earmarked for forestry conservation
- (6) creation of a department of forestry.

Hardtner's work led slowly to reforms, including his appointment as chairman of the new Louisiana Conservation Commission and the naming in 1917 of Reginald D. Forbes as Louisiana's first professionally trained state forester. Hardtner also worked to establish the interest group, the Louisiana Forestry Association and was its first president. He was active from its inception in 1916 of the Southern Forestry Conference. His labors also benefited the trade association, the Southern Pine Association. He also wrote many articles supporting his concept of forest management, works published by American Lumberman, Southern Lumberman, and Lumber Trade Journal.

== Political career ==
In 1910, Hardtner was elected as the first state representative from the newly established La Salle Parish, carved from the hilly western half of Catahoula Parish. He pushed for various forestry and conservation bills but constantly ran into the problem of a lack of available funding. His Act 261 of 1910 established the first reforestation contracts, under which state and local governments assessed cutover lands at a lowered valuation for taxable purposes provided that timber was grown and maintained on the land.

Hardtner was the first president of the La Salle Parish Police Jury, the equivalent of a county commission in other states, having served from 1908 to 1910 and 1912 to 1920. His two-year representative term extended from 1910 to 1912. He was a state senator from 1924 to 1928 and was earlier a delegate to the 1921 convention that rewrote the Louisiana Constitution, which included some basic provisions regarding forestry. Hardtner was defeated for renomination in the 1928 Democratic primary by future Governor Oscar K. Allen, a protégé of Huey Pierce Long, Jr. Allen, however, quickly left the state Senate to become chairman of the Louisiana Highway Commission, after the Louisiana Supreme Court ruled that no one could hold executive and legislative offices simultaneously. He was hence succeeded in the upper chamber of the legislatured by fellow Democrat James L. Anderson.

In the 1900 general election, he ran on the William McKinley/Theodore Roosevelt ticket as a Republican for the United States House of Representatives, as Louisiana supported the Democrat William Jennings Bryan. He subsequently joined the majority Democrats in order to hold parish and state office, then practically excluded to Republican candidates. Hardtner polled 628 votes (9.2 percent) to Ransdell's 6,172 (90.8 percent). Hardtner was the last Republican even to seek the Fifth District House seat until 1976, when Frank Spooner, an oil and natural gas landman from Monroe, unsuccessfully challenged the Democratic nominee, Jerry Huckaby. of Bienville Parish. In the Democratic primary, Huckaby had unseated veteran Representative Otto E. Passman of Monroe.

== Family ==
Hardtner was married to the former Juliet Doerr (January 29, 1885–November 15, 1936), a native of St. Louis, Missouri. They were the parents of three daughters.

== Death and legacy ==
Hardtner had opposed the administration of Governor Huey Long. In August 1935, Hardtner was killed in a train-car crash while headed from La Salle Parish to Baton Rouge to defend his company in a tax dispute with the state government. The tragedy of the fatal accident is ironic in that Hardtner was president of his own railroad freight line in La Salle Parish. Hardtner's legacy centers on the management of forests on a sustained-yield basis to create a marketable timber crop in perpetuity. His example was eventually followed thereafter in setting timber management policies throughout the state, region, and nation. Oddly, a month after Hardtner's death, Huey Long died of wounds sustained from his assassination at the Louisiana State Capitol in Baton Rouge.

Juliet Doerr Hardtner died in New Orleans a year after her husband's passing. Henry and Juliet Hardtner are interred in the family plot next to the chapel at Mt. Olivet Cemetery in Pineville.

On April 27, 1939, a bronze tablet was dedicated to Hardtner's memory in Urania Town Park. The school and sawmill closed for the afternoon ceremony. The tablet was a gift of the Society of American Foresters, the Yale University School of Forestry, and the Hardtner family.

Quincy and Henry Hardtner are honored through the naming of the Episcopal Camp Hardtner and Conference Center near Pollock in Grant Parish. The camp began with 40 acres (160,000 m^{2}) and was doubled in size after World War II. The first summer camp was hosted there in 1948.

In 1973 and 1978, North Louisiana History published two articles on Hardtner.

The Henry Hardtner Award recognizes efforts that contribute to forest stewardship and sustainable forest management on non-industrial private lands. The award is presented by the Southern Group of State Foresters. In 1999, the first such award was presented to Rhett Johnson, the co-director of the Longleaf Alliance.

Other Hardtner award winners include:

- 2004 - George D. Kessler of Clemson University
- 2006 - Rick Hamilton of North Carolina State University
- 2006 - Dr. James Earl Kennamer, National Wild Turkey Federation
- 2012 - Dr. Jeff Stringer, University of Kentucky
- 2013 - Dr. Mark Megalos of North Carolina State University
- 2018 - Sam Cook, NC State University, College of Natural

Louisiana State Senate
| Preceded by Thomas B. Gilbert, Sr. | Louisiana State Senator for Caldwell, Grant, La Salle, and Winn parishes Henry Ernest Hardtner; 1924–1928 | Succeeded by Oscar K. Allen |
Louisiana House of Representatives
| Preceded by New position | Louisiana State Representative for La Salle Parish; Henry Ernest Hardtner; 1910–1912 | Succeeded by T. J. Kendrick |
