= George Washington Bolton =

American politician (1841–1931)

- Born: September 15, 1841 near Griffin, Georgia, U.S.
- Died: August 2, 1931 (aged 89); Alexandria, Louisiana, U.S.
- Resting place: Mount Olivet Cemetery; Pineville, Louisiana, U.S.
- Occupations: Politician; businessman
- Spouse: Tennessee Wade (m. 1868; died 1931)
- Children: 10, including James W. Bolton

George Washington Bolton (September 15, 1841 – August 2, 1931) was a state legislator, businessman, and school board member in Rapides Parish, Louisiana.

== Early life ==
George Washington Bolton was born to Eliza (née Burbridge) and Elisha P. Bolton near Griffin, Georgia, on September 15, 1841. At sixteen, he moved with his parents to Shiloh, Union Parish, Louisiana. He was taught in his father's private school in Shiloh.

== Career ==
Bolton enlisted in the Confederate Army in 1861. He served with the Company E, 12th Louisiana Infantry throughout the Civil War. He was wounded at the Battle of Nashville. He achieved the rank of sergeant.

After the war, he taught for one year in Shiloh. He then engaged in merchantile business in Winnfield. He later worked as a head of a merchantile business in Pineville from 1869 to 1900. He served in the Rapides Parish Police Jury. He served in the Louisiana House of Representatives from 1888 to 1896 and served as House Speaker from 1892 to 1896.

A businessman and banker, he founded Rapides Bank and Trust Company in Alexandria, Louisiana. He served as its president from its founding in 1888 to 1912. He then went on to serve as its chairman from 1912 to 1931. It later merged into Bank One Corporation. In 1900, he was the first president of the Louisiana Bankers Association. He was one of the founders of Emmanuel Baptist Church in downtown Alexandria and the First Baptist church in Pineville. Bolton served as a member of the Rapides Parish School Board.

He was a leading member of the Pineville mason fraternal organization.

== Personal life ==
He married Tennessee Wade of Winnfield in October 1868. Together, they had ten children, but only six survived, including James W. Bolton, G.F. Bolton, Frank P. Bolton, J.P. Bolton, R.C. Bolton and Bertha Hall. His wife died on July 10, 1931.

Al Bolton was his grandson.

== Death ==
Bolton died on August 2, 1931, at his home in Alexandria. He was interred at Mount Olivet Cemetery in Pineville.

== Legacy ==
Bolton Avenue in Alexandria is named in his honor. Bolton High School in Alexandria is named for him.

The Louisiana Digital Library has a photograph of him. A January 1863 letter he wrote to Malvina Bolton is also preserved.

== See also ==
- List of speakers of the Louisiana House of Representatives
