= O. H. Brewster =

American politician

Orlando H. Brewster was a federal general land surveyor and politician in Louisiana. His vote as an elector was disputed. He served as a member of the Louisiana Senate. In 1872 he was Speaker of the Louisiana House of Representatives. He was an elector for Rutherford B. Hayes and received an appointment as surveyor after his election.

He was born in New York. In 1879 he was an elector. He served as suveyor-general in Louisiana.

He was wounded at Blackwell Station. He supported Rutherford B. Hayes candidacy for I.S. president. He was a Republican and served as an elector. He had a resort in Lake Charm, Florida.

== See also ==
- List of speakers of the Louisiana House of Representatives
