= Lorris Wimberly =

American politician

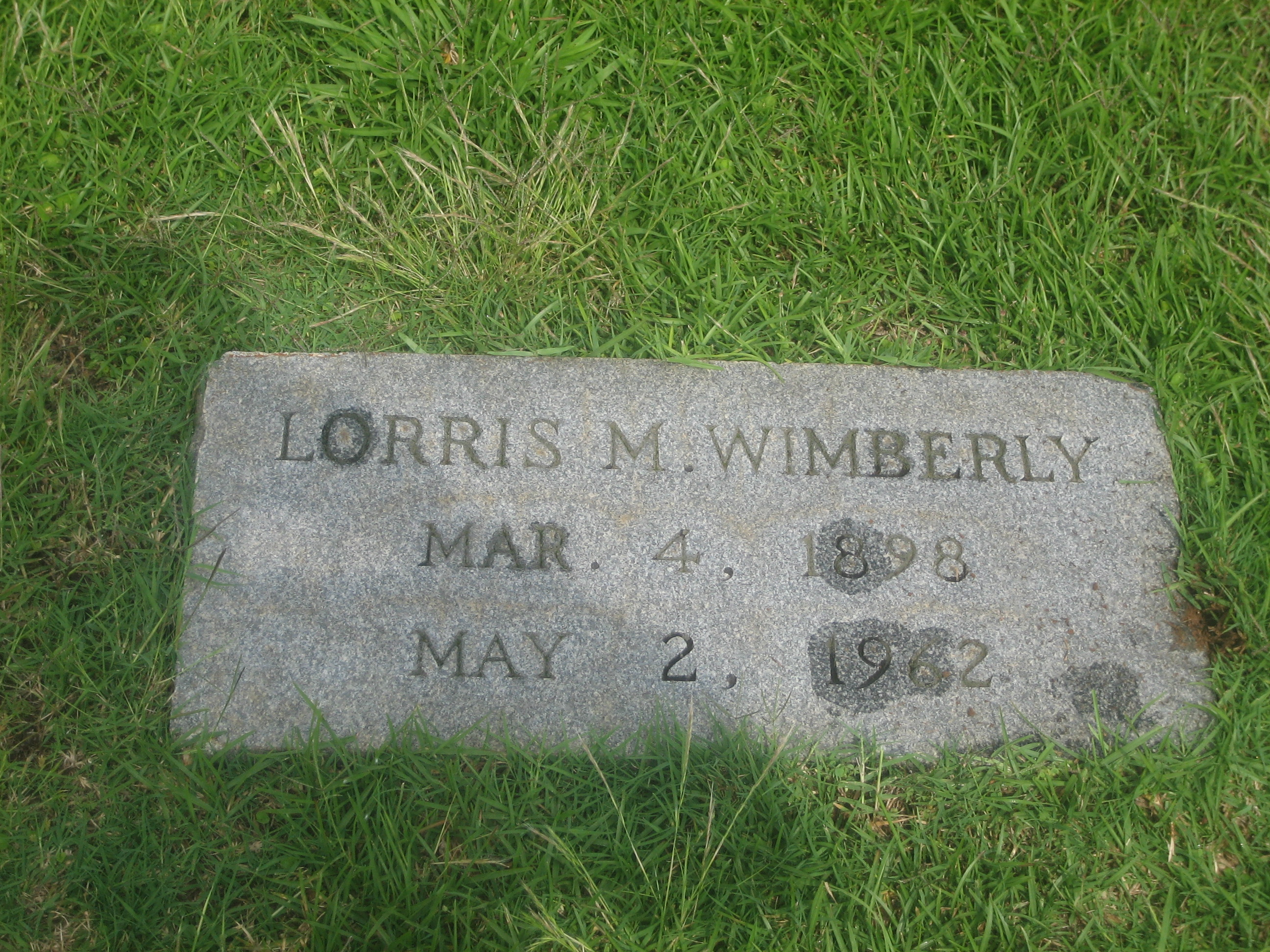
Grave marker

Lorris May Wimberly Sr. (1898 - 1962) was a state legislator in Louisiana. Rush Wimberly was his father. He married Dorothy Knox. He served as Speaker of the Louisiana House of Representatives.
