= List of governors of Louisiana =

The governor of Louisiana is the head of government of the U.S. state of Louisiana. The governor is the head of the executive branch of Louisiana's state government and is charged with enforcing state laws. Republican Jeff Landry has served as the current governor since January 8, 2024.

== List of governors ==
=== Territory of Orleans ===
Louisiana was purchased by the United States from France in 1803. On October 1, 1804, Orleans Territory was organized from the southern part of the Purchase, with the remainder being made the District of Louisiana and placed under the jurisdiction of Indiana Territory. The District of Louisiana would later become Louisiana Territory, but after Orleans Territory became the state of Louisiana, Louisiana Territory was renamed Missouri Territory.

Governor of the Territory of Orleans
Governor	Term in office	Appointed by
William C. C. Claiborne (d. 1817)	December 20, 1803 (Note: Claiborne was authorized by President Thomas Jefferson in October 1803 to receive the new lands purchased from France, and proclaimed the acquisition of Louisiana in New Orleans on December 20. He was appointed to the position of Governor of Orleans Territory on August 30, 1804, taking office on October 2. He was formally nominated for the position on November 30, and confirmed by the Senate on December 12. He was reappointed on June 8, 1805, during a Senate recess; and was reconfirmed by the Senate on December 23, 1805; November 14, 1808; and November 26, 1811.) – July 30, 1812 (3146 days; elected state governor)	Thomas Jefferson
William C. C. Claiborne (d. 1817)	December 20, 1803 – July 30, 1812 (3146 days; elected state governor)	James Madison

=== State of Louisiana ===
Louisiana was admitted to the Union on April 30, 1812. It seceded from the Union on January 26, 1861, and was a founding member of the Confederate States of America on February 8, 1861. However, since substantial parts of the state remained in Union hands throughout the war, there were two lines of governors elected. Following the end of the American Civil War, Louisiana during Reconstruction was part of the Fifth Military District, which exerted some control over governor appointments and elections. Louisiana was readmitted to the Union on July 9, 1868.

The 1812 constitution established the office of governor, to serve for four years starting from the fourth Monday after the election. In 1845, the start date was moved to the fourth Monday of the January after the election; in 1864, it was moved to the second Monday of the January after the election; in 1879 it was moved to the first Monday after the General Assembly announced the election result; and the 1974 Constitution changed the date, effective in 1980, to the second Monday of the March following the election. This was amended in 1987, to become effective in 1992, to the second Monday of January. Governors were not allowed to succeed themselves until 1864, when the constitution held no term limits. The restriction on governors succeeding themselves was reintroduced in 1868, removed in 1870, and again added in 1898. An amendment to the constitution passed in 1966 allowed governors to succeed themselves once before requiring a gap before they can be elected again. Five governors have served nonconsecutive terms. André B. Roman, Francis T. Nicholls, and Jimmie Davis each served two non-consecutive terms, while Earl Long and Edwin Edwards both served in three distinct stints.

In the event of a vacancy, the President of the Senate originally acted as governor. The 1845 constitution created the office of lieutenant governor, to be elected at the same time and manner as the governor and who would act as governor in the event of a vacancy. The 1913 constitution established that the lieutenant governor would become governor in case of a vacancy. The governor and the lieutenant governor are not officially elected on the same ticket.

Governors of the State of Louisiana
No.	Governor	Term in office	Party	Election	Lt. Governor (Note: The office of lieutenant governor was created in 1845.) (Note: Lieutenant governors represented the same party as their governor unless noted.)
1	William C. C. Claiborne (d. 1817)	July 30, 1812 (Note: Louisiana became a state on April 30, 1812, but Claiborne was not sworn in as state governor until July 30.) – December 17, 1816 (1602 days; term-limited) (Note: Under the 1812 constitution, governors were ineligible for four years after the expiration of their elected term.)	Democratic- Republican	1812	Office did not exist
2	Jacques Villeré (1761–1830)	December 17, 1816 – December 18, 1820 (1463 days; term-limited)	Democratic- Republican	1816	Office did not exist
3	Thomas B. Robertson (1779–1828)	December 18, 1820 – November 15, 1824 (1429 days; resigned) (Note: Robertson resigned, having been confirmed to a joint seat on the United States District Court for both the Eastern and Western Districts of Louisiana.)	Democratic- Republican	1820	Office did not exist
4	Henry S. Thibodaux (1769–1827)	November 15, 1824 – December 13, 1824 (29 days; retired)	Democratic- Republican	President of the Senate acting	Office did not exist
5	Henry Johnson (1783–1864)	December 13, 1824 – December 15, 1828 (1464 days; term-limited)	Adams; Republican	1824	Office did not exist
6	Pierre Derbigny (1769–1829)	December 15, 1828 – October 6, 1829 (296 days; died in office)	Adams; Republican	1828	Office did not exist
7	Arnaud Beauvais (1783–1843)	October 6, 1829 – January 14, 1830 (101 days; senate term ended) (Note: Sources disagree on why Beauvais' term ended; some say he lost his bid to be reelected as senate president, while others say he resigned so that he could run for governor.)	National; Republican	President of the Senate acting	Office did not exist
8	Jacques Dupré (1773–1846)	January 14, 1830 – January 31, 1831 (383 days; retired)	National; Republican	President of the Senate acting	Office did not exist
9	André B. Roman (1795–1866)	January 31, 1831 – February 2, 1835 (1464 days; term-limited)	National; Republican	1830 (special) (Note: Special election called due to the death of Pierre Derbigny and the succession crisis that followed.)	Office did not exist
10	Edward D. White Sr. (1795–1847)	February 2, 1835 – February 4, 1839 (1464 days; term-limited) (Note: White, being term-limited, had already been elected to the United States House of Representatives when his term ended.)	Whig	1834	Office did not exist
9	André B. Roman (1795–1866)	February 4, 1839 – January 30, 1843 (1457 days; term-limited)	Whig	1838	Office did not exist
11	Alexandre Mouton (1804–1885)	January 30, 1843 – February 12, 1846 (1110 days; term-limited)	Democratic	1842 (Note: The 1845 constitution adjusted the election schedule, shortening this term to three years.)	Office did not exist
12	Isaac Johnson (1803–1853)	February 12, 1846 – January 28, 1850 (1447 days; term-limited) (Note: Under the 1845 constitution, governors were ineligible for four years after the expiration of their elected term.)	Democratic	1846	Trasimond Landry
13	Joseph Marshall Walker (1784–1856)	January 28, 1850 – January 20, 1853 (1089 days; term-limited) (Note: Walker was term-limited; (Note: Under the 1852 constitution, governors were ineligible for four years after the expiration of their elected term.) while some sources state he resigned due to objections to the 1852 constitution, no contemporary news reports of his resignation have been found, and Paul Octave Hébert was inaugurated on January 20.)	Democratic	1849 (Note: The 1852 constitution adjusted the election schedule, shortening this term to three years.)	Jean Baptiste Plauché
14	Paul Octave Hébert (1818–1880)	January 20, 1853 – January 28, 1856 (1104 days; term-limited)	Democratic	1852	William Wood Farmer (died October 29, 1854)
14	Paul Octave Hébert (1818–1880)	January 20, 1853 – January 28, 1856 (1104 days; term-limited)	Democratic	1852	Robert C. Wickliffe
15	Robert C. Wickliffe (1819–1895)	January 28, 1856 – January 23, 1860 (1457 days; term-limited)	Democratic	1855	Charles Homer Mouton (resigned 1856)
15	Robert C. Wickliffe (1819–1895)	January 28, 1856 – January 23, 1860 (1457 days; term-limited)	Democratic	1855	William F. Griffin
16	Thomas Overton Moore (1804–1876)	January 23, 1860 – January 25, 1864 (1464 days; term-limited) (Note: Under the 1861 constitution, governors were ineligible for four years after the expiration of their elected term.)	Democratic	1859 (Note: The area around New Orleans was captured by the Union on April 25, 1862. The control was enough that it operated within the United States as the legitimate state of Louisiana, electing members to the United States House of Representatives. With both governments being considered legitimate, both lines are included in all lists of governors. The schism ended when the Confederate governor fled and the whole state came under Union control.)	Henry M. Hyams
17	George Foster Shepley (1819–1878)	July 2, 1862 – March 4, 1864 (612 days; civil government reestablished)	Military governor (Note: Shepley was appointed military governor by General Benjamin Butler.)		Vacant
18	Henry Watkins Allen (1820–1866)	January 25, 1864 – June 2, 1865 (495 days; resigned) (Note: Allen fled to Mexico to avoid capture following the American Civil War.)	Democratic	1863 (Confederate)	Benjamin W. Pearce
19	Michael Hahn (1830–1886)	March 4, 1864 – March 4, 1865 (366 days; resigned) (Note: Hahn resigned, having been elected to the United States Senate; however, the Confederate states were denied their seats in the 39th United States Congress.)	Union Free Trade (Republican)	1864 (Union)	James Madison Wells
20	James Madison Wells (1808–1899)	March 4, 1865 – June 3, 1867 (822 days; removed) (Note: Wells was removed from office by General Philip Sheridan for failing to properly implement Reconstruction reforms.)	Citizens Ticket	Lieutenant governor acting	Vacant
20	James Madison Wells (1808–1899)	March 4, 1865 – June 3, 1867 (822 days; removed)	Citizens Ticket	1865	Albert Voorhies
21	Benjamin Flanders (1816–1896)	June 6, 1867 (Note: Thomas J. Durant was appointed to replace Wells, but declined the appointment. Flanders was then appointed on June 6 by General Philip Sheridan.) – January 2, 1868 (211 days; resigned) (Note: Flanders resigned due to Major General Winfield Scott Hancock's removing Radical Republicans that Flanders had appointed to positions in state government.)	Appointed by military occupation		Vacant
22	Joshua Baker (1799–1885)	January 2, 1868 (Note: Baker was appointed by General Winfield Scott Hancock on January 2 to replace Benjamin Flanders, though he would not take the oath of office until January 8.) – June 27, 1868 (178 days; removed) (Note: Baker was removed from office by General Ulysses S. Grant.)	Appointed by military occupation		Vacant
23	Henry Clay Warmoth (1842–1931)	June 27, 1868 (Note: Baker was removed, and Governor-elect Warmoth appointed as replacement, on June 27. Warmoth was formally inaugurated on July 13.) – December 9, 1872 (1627 days; removed) (Note: During the 1872 election, Warmoth endorsed John McEnery for governor, and the State Returning Board, which he appointed, declared McEnery the winner. However, a rival board declared William Pitt Kellogg the winner, and the legislature impeached Warmoth on charges related to the election. Impeached officials are suspended from office, so at this time, P. B. S. Pinchback filled the office. The term expired only 35 days later, at which point impeachment charges were dropped, as Warmoth was no longer governor.)	Appointed by military occupation		Vacant
23	Henry Clay Warmoth (1842–1931)	June 27, 1868 – December 9, 1872 (1627 days; removed)	Republican	1868	Oscar Dunn (died November 22, 1871)
23	Henry Clay Warmoth (1842–1931)	June 27, 1868 – December 9, 1872 (1627 days; removed)	Republican	1868	Vacant
23	Henry Clay Warmoth (1842–1931)	June 27, 1868 – December 9, 1872 (1627 days; removed)	Republican	1868	P. B. S. Pinchback (appointed December 6, 1871)
24	P. B. S. Pinchback (1837–1921)	December 9, 1872 – January 13, 1873 (36 days; retired) (Note: Pinchback had already lost the election for United States House of Representatives when he succeeded Warmoth.)	Republican	Lieutenant governor acting	Vacant
25	John McEnery (1833–1891)	January 13, 1873 – May 22, 1873 (130 days; removed) (Note: The State Election Board certified McEnery as the winner of the 1872 election; however, a rival board declared Kellogg the winner, and the legislature went with that. Both McEnery and Kellogg declared victory and formed governments, and conflict culminated in the Battle of Liberty Place and the Colfax massacre. President Ulysses S. Grant issued a proclamation on May 22, 1873, declaring Kellogg the winner.)	Democratic (Note: McEnery represented the Democratic Reform and the Liberal Republican Parties.)	1872	Davidson Bradfute Penn
26	William Pitt Kellogg (1830–1918)	January 13, 1873 – January 8, 1877 (1457 days; retired) (Note: Kellogg was instead elected to the United States Senate.)	Republican	1872	C. C. Antoine
27	Stephen B. Packard (1839–1922)	January 8, 1877 – April 25, 1877 (108 days; removed) (Note: Much like the 1872 election, this election was disputed. Both Packard and Nicholls declared victory and formed governments, until President Rutherford B. Hayes recognized Nicholls as governor in the Compromise of 1877.)	Republican	1876 (Note: The 1879 constitution adjusted the election schedule, shortening this term to three years.)	C. C. Antoine
28	Francis T. Nicholls (1834–1912)	January 8, 1877 – January 14, 1880 (1102 days; retired)	Democratic	1876	Louis A. Wiltz
29	Louis A. Wiltz (1843–1881)	January 14, 1880 – October 16, 1881 (642 days; died in office)	Democratic	1879	Samuel D. McEnery
30	Samuel D. McEnery (1837–1910)	October 16, 1881 – May 21, 1888 (2410 days; lost nomination)	Democratic	Lieutenant governor acting	William A. Robertson (removed December 24, 1881)
30	Samuel D. McEnery (1837–1910)	October 16, 1881 – May 21, 1888 (2410 days; lost nomination)	Democratic	Lieutenant governor acting	George L. Walton
30	Samuel D. McEnery (1837–1910)	October 16, 1881 – May 21, 1888 (2410 days; lost nomination)	Democratic	1884	Clay Knobloch
28	Francis T. Nicholls (1834–1912)	May 21, 1888 – May 16, 1892 (1457 days; retired)	Democratic	1888	James Jeffries
31	Murphy J. Foster (1849–1921)	May 16, 1892 – May 21, 1900 (2927 days; term-limited) (Note: Under the 1898 constitution, elected governors were ineligible to succeed themselves.)	Anti-Lottery; Democratic	1892	Charles Parlange (resigned December 11, 1893)
31	Murphy J. Foster (1849–1921)	May 16, 1892 – May 21, 1900 (2927 days; term-limited)	Anti-Lottery; Democratic	1892	Hiram R. Lott (died June 2, 1895)
31	Murphy J. Foster (1849–1921)	May 16, 1892 – May 21, 1900 (2927 days; term-limited)	Anti-Lottery; Democratic	1892	Robert H. Snyder
31	Murphy J. Foster (1849–1921)	May 16, 1892 – May 21, 1900 (2927 days; term-limited)	Anti-Lottery; Democratic	1896	Robert H. Snyder
32	William Wright Heard (1853–1926)	May 21, 1900 – May 16, 1904 (1457 days; term-limited)	Democratic	1900	Albert Estopinal
33	Newton C. Blanchard (1849–1922)	May 16, 1904 – May 18, 1908 (1464 days; term-limited)	Democratic	1904	Jared Y. Sanders Sr.
34	Jared Y. Sanders Sr. (1869–1944)	May 18, 1908 – May 20, 1912 (1464 days; term-limited)	Democratic	1908	Paul M. Lambremont
35	Luther E. Hall (1869–1921)	May 20, 1912 – May 15, 1916 (1457 days; term-limited) (Note: Under the 1913 constitution, elected governors were ineligible to succeed themselves.)	Democratic	1912	Thomas C. Barret
36	Ruffin G. Pleasant (1871–1937)	May 15, 1916 – May 17, 1920 (1464 days; term-limited)	Democratic	1916	Fernand Mouton
37	John M. Parker (1863–1939)	May 17, 1920 – May 19, 1924 (1464 days; term-limited) (Note: Under the 1921 constitution, elected governors were ineligible to succeed themselves.)	Democratic	1920	Hewitt Bouanchaud (resigned April 12, 1924)
37	John M. Parker (1863–1939)	May 17, 1920 – May 19, 1924 (1464 days; term-limited)	Democratic	1920	Delos R. Johnson
38	Henry L. Fuqua (1865–1926)	May 19, 1924 – October 11, 1926 (876 days; died in office)	Democratic	1924	Oramel Simpson
39	Oramel Simpson (1870–1932)	October 11, 1926 – May 21, 1928 (589 days; lost nomination)	Democratic	Succeeded from lieutenant governor	Philip H. Gilbert
40	Huey Long (1893–1935)	May 21, 1928 – January 25, 1932 (1345 days; resigned) (Note: Long was elected to the United States Senate for a term beginning March 4, 1931; however, he did not take the seat until January 25, 1932. This was in part to prevent Lieutenant Governor Cyr from replacing him as governor. When the senate term began, Cyr took the oath of office as governor and claimed the office; however, Long called this illegitimate, and said that by taking the oath of office of the governor, he had resigned from being lieutenant governor. This opened the way for the president pro tempore of the senate, Alvin Olin King, to become lieutenant governor, and ultimately succeed Long. Cyr continued to claim the office of governor on and off until 1932, but ultimately lacked recognition.)	Democratic	1928	Paul N. Cyr (removed March 4, 1931)
40	Huey Long (1893–1935)	May 21, 1928 – January 25, 1932 (1345 days; resigned)	Democratic	1928	Alvin Olin King
41	Alvin Olin King (1890–1958)	January 25, 1932 – May 16, 1932 (113 days; retired)	Democratic	Succeeded from lieutenant governor	Vacant
42	Oscar K. Allen (1882–1936)	May 16, 1932 – January 28, 1936 (1353 days; died in office)	Democratic	1932	John B. Fournet (resigned January 2, 1935)
42	Oscar K. Allen (1882–1936)	May 16, 1932 – January 28, 1936 (1353 days; died in office)	Democratic	1932	James A. Noe
43	James A. Noe (1890–1976)	January 28, 1936 – May 12, 1936 (106 days; retired) (Note: Noe had already been reelected to the Louisiana State Senate when he succeeded Allen.)	Democratic	Succeeded from lieutenant governor	Vacant
44	Richard W. Leche (1898–1965)	May 12, 1936 – June 26, 1939 (1141 days; resigned) (Note: Leche resigned due to a scandal involving mail fraud.)	Democratic	1936	Earl Long
45	Earl Long (1895–1960)	June 26, 1939 – May 14, 1940 (324 days; lost nomination)	Democratic	Succeeded from lieutenant governor	Coleman Lindsey
46	Sam H. Jones (1897–1978)	May 14, 1940 – May 9, 1944 (1457 days; term-limited)	Democratic	1940	Marc M. Mouton
47	Jimmie Davis (1899–2000)	May 9, 1944 – May 11, 1948 (1464 days; term-limited)	Democratic	1944	J. Emile Verret
45	Earl Long (1895–1960)	May 11, 1948 – May 13, 1952 (1464 days; term-limited)	Democratic	1948	Bill Dodd
48	Robert F. Kennon (1902–1988)	May 13, 1952 – May 15, 1956 (1464 days; term-limited)	Democratic	1952	C. E. Barham
45	Earl Long (1895–1960)	May 15, 1956 – May 10, 1960 (1457 days; term-limited) (Note: Long, being term-limited, had already lost the Democratic nomination for Lieutenant Governor of Louisiana when his term ended.)	Democratic	1956	Lether Edward Frazar
47	Jimmie Davis (1899–2000)	May 10, 1960 – May 12, 1964 (1464 days; term-limited)	Democratic	1960	Taddy Aycock
49	John McKeithen (1918–1999)	May 12, 1964 – May 9, 1972 (2920 days; term-limited) (Note: Under a 1966 amendment to the constitution, governors were ineligible for the term immediately after their second successive term.)	Democratic	1964	Taddy Aycock
49	John McKeithen (1918–1999)	May 12, 1964 – May 9, 1972 (2920 days; term-limited)	Democratic	1968	Taddy Aycock
50	Edwin Edwards (1927–2021)	May 9, 1972 – March 10, 1980 (2863 days; term-limited) (Note: Under the 1974 constitution, governors are ineligible to be elected to the succeeding term after they have served more than one and a half terms in two consecutive terms.)	Democratic	1972	Jimmy Fitzmorris
50	Edwin Edwards (1927–2021)	May 9, 1972 – March 10, 1980 (2863 days; term-limited)	Democratic	1975	Jimmy Fitzmorris
51	Dave Treen (1928–2009)	March 10, 1980 – March 12, 1984 (1464 days; lost election)	Republican	1979	Robert Louis Freeman Sr. (Note: Represented the Democratic Party)
50	Edwin Edwards (1927–2021)	March 12, 1984 – March 14, 1988 (1464 days; withdrew) (Note: Edwards was forced into a runoff with fellow Democrat Buddy Roemer, but he withdrew before it occurred, thus giving Roemer the victory.)	Democratic	1983	Robert Louis Freeman Sr.
52	Buddy Roemer (1943–2021)	March 14, 1988 – January 13, 1992 (1401 days; lost election)	Democratic (Note: Roemer was elected as a Democrat, and switched to the Republican Party late in his term.)	1987	Paul Hardy (Note: Represented the Republican Party.)
50	Edwin Edwards (1927–2021)	January 13, 1992 – January 8, 1996 (1457 days; retired)	Democratic	1991	Melinda Schwegmann
53	Mike Foster (1930–2020)	January 8, 1996 – January 12, 2004 (2927 days; term-limited)	Republican	1995	Kathleen Blanco
53	Mike Foster (1930–2020)	January 8, 1996 – January 12, 2004 (2927 days; term-limited)	Republican	1999	Kathleen Blanco
54	Kathleen Blanco (1942–2019)	January 12, 2004 – January 14, 2008 (1464 days; retired)	Democratic	2003	Mitch Landrieu (resigned May 3, 2010)
55	Bobby Jindal (b. 1971)	January 14, 2008 – January 11, 2016 (2920 days; term-limited)	Republican	2007	Mitch Landrieu (resigned May 3, 2010)
55	Bobby Jindal (b. 1971)	January 14, 2008 – January 11, 2016 (2920 days; term-limited)	Republican	2007	Scott Angelle
55	Bobby Jindal (b. 1971)	January 14, 2008 – January 11, 2016 (2920 days; term-limited)	Republican	2007	Jay Dardenne (elected November 22, 2010)
55	Bobby Jindal (b. 1971)	January 14, 2008 – January 11, 2016 (2920 days; term-limited)	Republican	2011	Jay Dardenne (elected November 22, 2010)
56	John Bel Edwards (b. 1966)	January 11, 2016 – January 8, 2024 (2920 days; term-limited)	Democratic	2015	Billy Nungesser
56	John Bel Edwards (b. 1966)	January 11, 2016 – January 8, 2024 (2920 days; term-limited)	Democratic	2019	Billy Nungesser
57	Jeff Landry (b. 1970)	January 8, 2024 – Incumbent (Note: Landry's term will expire on January 10, 2028.) (in office 1050 days)	Republican	2023	Billy Nungesser

== See also ==
- Gubernatorial lines of succession in the United States § Louisiana
- Lieutenant Governor of Louisiana
- List of colonial governors of Louisiana
- List of Louisiana state legislatures

== Sources ==
- "Former Louisiana Governors". National Governors Association.
- "Louisiana Constitution". State Democracy Research Initiative. University of Wisconsin Law School.
- Dubin, Michael J. (2003). United States Gubernatorial Elections, 1776–1860: The Official Results by State and County. McFarland. ISBN 0-7864-1439-1 – via Internet Archive.
- Glashan, Roy R. (1979). American Governors and Gubernatorial Elections, 1775-1978. Meckler Books. ISBN 0-7201-1511-6 – via Internet Archive.
- Kallenbach, Joseph E.; Kallenbach, Jessamine S. (1977). American State Governors, 1776-1976. Oceana Publications. ISBN 978-0-379-00665-0 – via Internet Archive.
- McMullin, Thomas A.; Walker, David (1984). Biographical Directory of American Territorial Governors. Meckler Publishing. ISBN 0-930466-11-X – via Internet Archive.
- Mullaney, Marie Marmo (1994). Biographical Directory of the Governors of the United States, 1988–1994. Greenwood Publishing Group. ISBN 0-313-28312-5 – via Internet Archive.
- Sobel, Robert; Raimo, John (1978). Biographical Directory of the Governors of the United States, 1789-1978. Vol. 2. Meckler Books. ISBN 0-930466-01-2 – via Internet Archive.
- Thorpe, Francis Newton, ed. (1909). The Federal and State Constitutions, Colonial Charters, and Other Organic Laws of the States, Territories, and Colonies Now or Heretofore Forming the United States of America. Vol. 3. United States Government Publishing Office – via Internet Archive.
