= 1865 Louisiana gubernatorial special election =

1865 Louisiana special gubernatorial election
- November 7, 1865
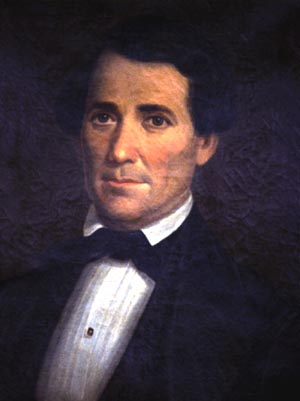

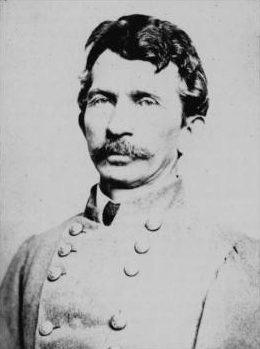
Nominee	J. Madison Wells	Henry Watkins Allen (in absentia)
Party	Conservative Union	Independent Democratic
Alliance	Democratic
Popular vote	22,312	5,497
Percentage	80.23%	19.77%
- Election results by county Wells: 50–60% 60–70% 70–80% 80–90% 90–100% Allen: 60–70% 80–90% 90–100%
Governor before election
James Madison Wells
Conservative Union
Elected Governor
James Madison Wells
Conservative Union

The 1865 Louisiana gubernatorial special election was held on November 7. Acting governor James Madison Wells was elected to a full term in office over former Confederate-recognized governor Henry Watkins Allen, who was in exile in Mexico City and did not consent to his candidacy. This was the first election to take place under the Louisiana Constitution of 1864.

Historian Mark W. Summers framed the 1865 election as an example of the failure of moderate Reconstruction, which led to the split between radical Reconstruction at the federal level and secessionist resistance at the local and state level throughout the South. Although the moderate Wells was re-elected with the support of both the Democratic and Conservative Union parties, his margin of victory despite running effectively unopposed was disappointing. Wells later speculated that if Allen had actively consented to his candidacy, Allen would have easily won. Downballot, former Confederates nearly swept the election, leading to a constitutional crisis, civil unrest and federal intervention culminating in Wells's removal from office in 1867.

== Background ==
=== 1864 election and constitutional convention ===
By the end of the American Civil War, Louisiana had established a Union-recognized government under the provisions of Abraham Lincoln's ten percent plan. In 1864, Unionists in Union-controlled territories elected Michael Hahn as civilian governor. Hahn represented the moderate faction of Unionists, also known as Free State Republicans, who were aligned with the military government and favored the abolition of slavery but opposed further civil or political rights for freedmen. Hahn's victory came despite opposition from the Conservative Unionist faction, which opposed abolition (or favored compensation for former slave owners) and favored greater reconciliation with the defeated Confederates, and the Radical Republican faction, which supported universal suffrage and civil rights. Hahn also presided over a new constitutional convention, which excluded immigrants, slave owners, and secessionists from the political process entirely; after the conclusion of the Civil War and restoration of suffrage to white Louisianans in 1865, these groups came together to form the basis of the new post-war Democratic Party.

Hahn presided over an unstable government, with continued opposition from both radicals and conservatives. As governor, Hahn proscribed radicals from state office and delayed efforts for black suffrage as well as restoration of suffrage for former Confederate rebels. Relying on tacit support from conservatives, the Hahn faction relied on white Louisianans, the majority of whom had supported the Confederacy and would surely vote out the moderates once their voting rights were fully restored. In March 1865, Hahn resigned from office to join the United States Senate, (Note: Hahn was never sworn in as a United States senator. By the time he arrived in Washington, radicals had resolved not to admit any member-elect from a former Confederate state, having rejected the ten percent plan in favor of more stringent requirements for readmission to the Union.) and moderate lieutenant governor J. Madison Wells succeeded him.

=== Wells administration ===
As acting governor, Wells pursued an alliance with the Conservative Unionists, appointing several to high office, and greater reconciliation with former Confederates, several of whom were appointed as judges, district attorneys, and mayors under his administration. Wells also fought with former Republican allies, removing some from office and beginning a public feud with Nathaniel P. Banks, military commander of the Department of the Gulf. Perhaps most shockingly, Wells questioned the legitimacy of his own government and the 1864 state constitution, both of which had been established with limited popular approval from only some of Louisiana's parishes. Wells later attributed his political approach at this time to excessive trust and idealism, but historian Mark W. Summers suggests that reconciliation with conservatives and secessionists was an inevitable political consequence of the moderates' earlier rejection of universal manhood suffrage. Thus forced to rely on white voters, Wells realigned himself with more conservative Reconstruction policies in order to ensure his re-election by the new, Confederate-sympathetic electorate.

== Candidates ==
=== List of candidates ===
- Henry Watkins Allen, former Confederate-recognized governor of Louisiana (in absentia)
- J. Madison Wells, acting governor since March 1865 (Conservative Unionist and Democratic)

=== Nominations ===
By late summer, Wells's political approach had borne fruit. Having blocked radical policies on racial equality, Wells prevented the one opportunity for a merger of the Conservative Unionist and Democratic causes, ensuring the election would be fought on the issue of loyalty to the Union.

The Democratic state convention was led by a number of former Whig and American Party politicians, who had supplanted the former Democratic leadership who were killed or exiled during the war. The platform explicitly rejected the constitution of 1864 as a fraud and called for compensation for slave owners and the preservation of white supremacy in government. However, the convention endorsed Wells for governor, selecting its real preference, Albert Voorhies, for lieutenant governor.

On August 8, the Conservative Union Party issued a public letter favoring full and complete amnesty for rebels, while referring to secession itself as the "attempted illegal subversion of the government." The letter endorsed President Andrew Johnson, Wells, the Union, the constitution of 1864, and the continued limitation of suffrage to white men, but acknowledged emancipation as an accomplished fact. Wells called for a November election with some misgivings. Accordingly, the Conservative Unionists met in convention in October; their convention was dominated by New Orleans, with more delegates coming from the two largest wards than from all rural parishes combined. The convention endorsed Wells over their preferred choice, James G. Taliaferro, whom they nominated for lieutenant governor as the Democrats with Voorhies. They passed a new platform with little change from the August public letter.

The Republican Party, consisting of free men of color and relocated Union army officers (known as "carpetbaggers"), petitioned for the enfranchisement of all black Louisianans and boycotted the gubernatorial election. Instead, they held a state nominating convention on September 25 in New Orleans, taking special pains to ensure an equal number of white and black delegates. The convention nominated Henry Clay Warmoth, a young Union officer from Missouri, as a candidate for territorial delegate to the United States Congress, who would stand for election by the freedmen in an extralegal "voluntary election" to protest for equal suffrage.

== Campaign ==
Wells was assured of victory and confidently expressed his optimism that there was no difference between the Conservative Unionist and Democratic parties. Both parties stressed the importance of unity and loyalty during the campaign, though the Democrats accused the Conservatives of twisting Unionism into bigotry. "The Democratic Party," announced its executive committee, "is the party of equality. It is a liberal party. It proscribes no class of voters." The parties also continued to disagree over the 1864 constitution. Although Conservatives accepted criticisms of the process which led to the constitution, they defended it against claims that it would enfranchise freedmen. One Conservative campaigner, George Lacey, argued that although the constitution permitted the legislature to "extend the right of voting to all citizens ... negroes are not citizens, and cannot be, under the Constitution of the United States", likely relying on the 1857 United States Supreme Court decision Dred Scott v. Sandford.

Some Conservatives sought to appeal to laborers by deriding former slaveholders and pre-war Whigs, including criticizing proposals to remunerate them for emancipation. One Conservative campaigner, Benjamin Orr, asked, "Whose fault was it that these chattels were lost to their owners? Who is to blame? [I]s it not the fault of these very men, that ask you now that it is gone, and they have lost it?" Orr argued the Conservatives instead sympathized with the poor who had lost homes and land without any proposal for their restitution. Late in October, the Democratic campaign countered by choosing workingmen as key orators.

Although both parties opposed universal male suffrage and embraced the principle of political white supremacy, the Democratic position, according to Summers, was more explicit and dogmatic. One Democratic candidate vowed to protect Louisiana society against "the thousands of idle, vicious, vagrant, freedmen who swarm through the land in all the insolence of a mistaken freedom", and Democratic candidates generally invoked the will of God as the root cause of permanent racial inequality, consistent with their party platform, which called for government of whites, by whites, "to be perpetuated for the exclusive benefit of the white race". The Conservative platform, in contrast, favored white supremacy on the basis that it would provide substantial benefits for both white and black Americans. They praised the national government as one "established by white men for the benefit of all mankind who wish to live under its beneficent laws." Further, Conservatives opposed black suffrage for the time being, rather than as a matter of permanent principle grounded in natural inequalities. The Conservative platform proclaimed, "We are emphatically at this time opposed to the extension of the right of suffrage to those who have so recently emerged from bondage, and who, being wholly ignorant of our laws ... would become in the hands of political demagogues, dangerous to the peace and harmony of the country." In describing the contrast between the two 1865 platforms, Summers distinguishes the Conservatives as "[r]acists... but rarely race-baiters."

The Republican Party campaigned in its separate "voluntary election" by focusing on New Orleans and "missions" into the surrounding country parishes, organizing freedmen and educating them on the Republican platform for universal suffrage.

== Results ==
Although Wells was the nominee of both parties, a substantial write-in campaign for Henry Watkins Allen, the Confederate-recognized governor in exile, was launched against Allen's express wishes. Allen won five parishes and carried more than a quarter of the vote in eleven more. Wells later speculated that if Allen had actively consented to his candidacy, he would have won overwhelmingly.

1865 Louisiana gubernatorial election
Party	Candidate	Votes	%	±%
Conservative Union	J. Madison Wells (incumbent)	22,312	80.23%	
Independent Democratic	Henry Watkins Allen (write-in)	5,497	19.77%	
Total votes		27,809	100%	

Downballot, where the Democratic Party fielded a full ticket, the results were a landslide. Conservative Unionists lost every legislative seat but one and lost four out of five congressional races. The new state legislature, one Republican wrote to Nathaniel P. Banks, was a "second Secession legislature" and another told James A. Garfield, "every member elected ... was either a Confederate civil or military officer, or at least a man who never acted obnoxious to the secessionists." Many of the victorious candidates had emphasized their careers in the Confederate States Army or government while running.

In the separate "voluntary election" for freedmen in New Orleans and surrounding parishes, Warmoth claimed 19,105 votes for territorial delegate and another 2,300 at the legal polls for Congress. The total Republican extralegal vote cast in Orleans Parish exceeded that of Wells.

== Aftermath ==
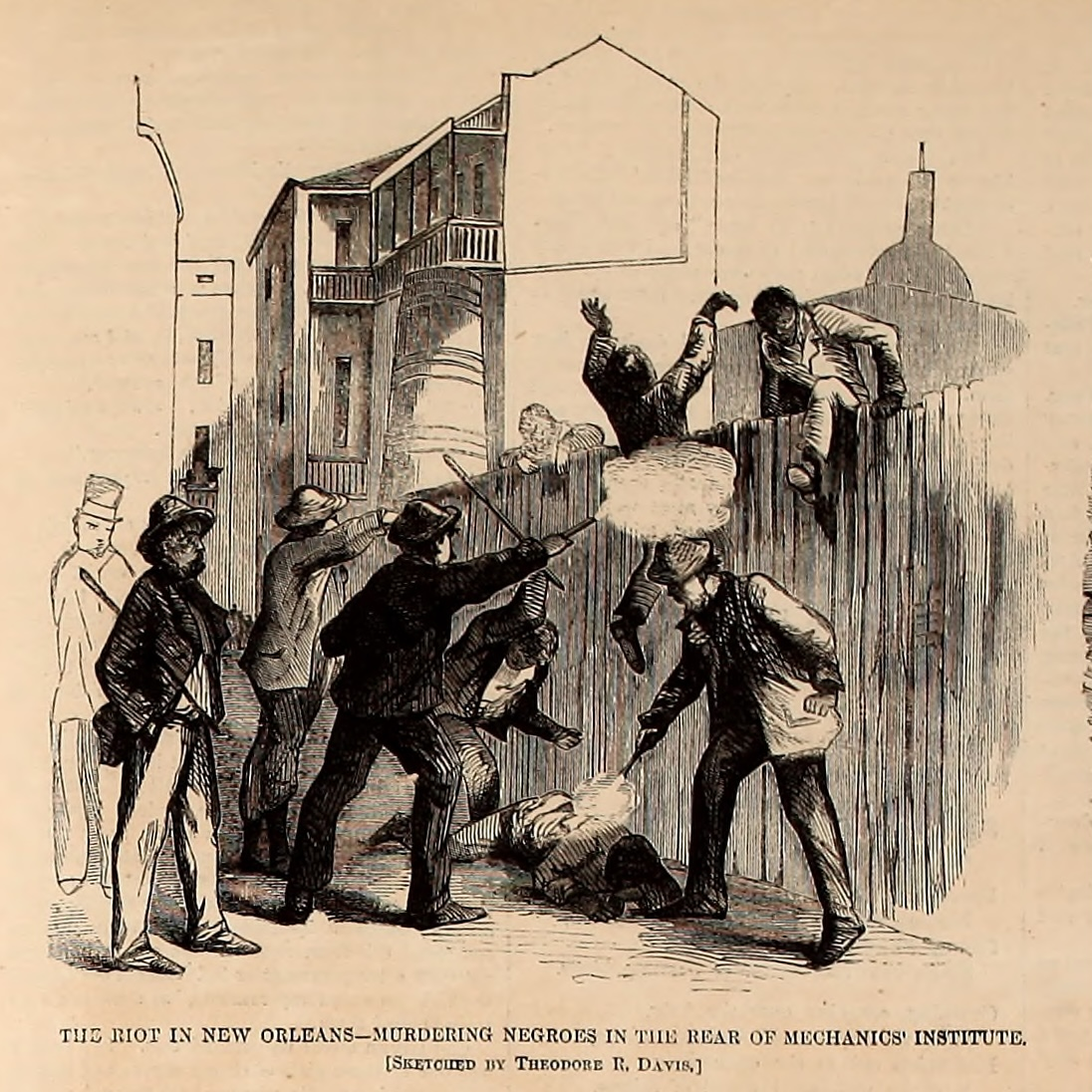
The election of John T. Monroe as mayor of New Orleans and ensuing constitutional crisis culminated in the 1866 New Orleans massacre and Wells's removal from office.

Among Republican centrists and Conservative Unionists, the Democratic sweep marked a betrayal of their congeniality toward ex-Confederates. More radical Republicans in Louisiana and the North accused Wells of disloyalty and called for federal intervention to enfranchise black men and disfranchise Confederates. They were increasingly joined by moderates, who feared that 1865 signaled a loss of the Union cause for which the Civil War had been fought.

Soon, Wells surprised his critics and became a symbol for radicalism within Louisiana. He proposed a package of conservative reforms to appease the new Democratic legislature, but they rejected his proposals in favor of completely overthrowing the Wells government and the constitution of 1864. When Wells vetoed bills calling for new elections in New Orleans (where offices had been appointive), the legislature overrode his veto. The 1866 New Orleans mayoral election, in which Wells's preferred candidate was narrowly beaten by ardent Confederate John T. Monroe, marked the end of any prospect for moderate Reconstruction in Louisiana. Wells and Rufus K. Howell responded by reviving the 1864 convention and extending suffrage to black men. The resulting constitutional crisis culminated in the New Orleans massacre of 1866, in which 38 were killed and 146 wounded by a mob of white men attempting to halt the convention's proceedings. Wells, facing impeachment in the legislature and criticism from radicals in Congress, was removed from office by Philip Sheridan, commander of the Department of the Gulf. Congress soon passed the Reconstruction Acts and established black suffrage in Louisiana, eliminating the Conservative Union faction and dividing the state between the Democratic and Republican parties.

== Notes ==
Preceded by 1864 Louisiana gubernatorial election (Union)	Louisiana gubernatorial elections	Succeeded by 1868 Louisiana gubernatorial election
