= James Madison Wells =

American politician (1808–1899)

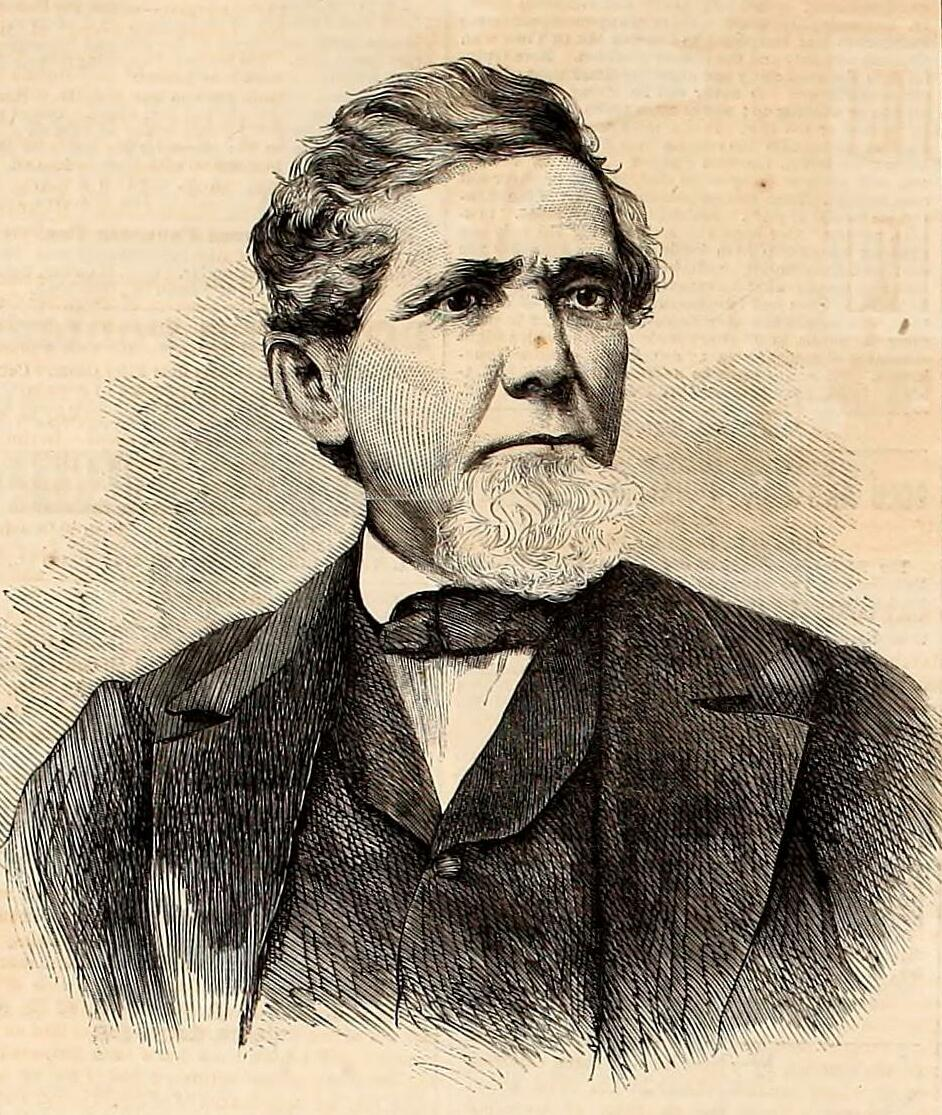
- Depiction from Harper's Weekly, 1865.

20th Governor of Louisiana
- In office March 4, 1865 – June 3, 1867
- Lieutenant: Albert Voorhies
- Preceded by: Michael Hahn
- Succeeded by: Benjamin Flanders

9th Lieutenant Governor of Louisiana
- In office 1864–1865
- Governor: Michael Hahn
- Preceded by: Benjamin W. Pearce
- Succeeded by: Albert Voorhies

Personal details
- Born: January 7, 1808 near Alexandria, Louisiana, US
- Died: February 28, 1899 (aged 91) Lecompte, Louisiana, US
- Party: Republican
- Spouse: Mary Ann Scott
- Children: 13

James Madison Wells (January 7, 1808 – February 28, 1899) was a planter, lawyer, and politician who became the 20th governor of Louisiana during Reconstruction. Although a slave owner, Wells opposed secession and remained loyal to The Union throughout the Civil War. After serving as the ninth lieutenant governor under Michael Hahn, he assumed office as Governor after Hahn was elected to the U.S. Senate.

== Early life ==
James Madison Wells was born on New Hope Plantation near Alexandria, Louisiana, on January 7, 1808 to Samuel Levi Wells II and Mary Elizabeth Calvit Wells. His father was a member of Louisiana's constitutional convention in 1811 and died when James was eight years old.

Wells was educated at the Jesuit-run St. Joseph's College in Bardstown south of Louisville, Kentucky; Partridge's Academy, Middletown, Connecticut; and Cincinnati Law School. In Cincinnati, he was tutored in law by an old-line Federalist named Charles Hammond, who edited the Cincinnati Gazette. Hammond's frequent attacks on slavery failed to influence Wells. Wells later owned nearly one hundred slaves.

He moved to New Orleans in 1830 and married Mary Ann Scott with whom he had thirteen children.

== Political activities ==
In 1833, Wells married 15-year-old Mary Ann Scott; together they had 14 children. Wells inherited a substantial estate; he controlled a large cotton plantation called New Hope near Alexandria, a sugar plantation on Bayou Huffpower in Avoyelles Parish called Wellswood, and a large summer home Jessamine Hill near Lecompte, Louisiana. Wells was appointed Sheriff of Rapides Parish in 1840 by Governor Andre B. Roman. Wells was an active Whig and a large slave holder. Eventually, as the Whig Party collapsed in the 1850s, Wells became a Democrat. His brother, Thomas Jefferson Wells, was an opposition nominee for governor in 1859, against Democratic nominee and eventual winner Thomas Overton Moore.

In 1860, he supported Stephen A. Douglas, the Northern Democratic candidate for president and was an ardent supporter of the Union. For that, he was criticized by his neighbors and by his brother. During the Civil War, Wells was arrested by Confederate officials for his Union sympathies.

Wells remained on his plantation outside Alexandria until the spring of 1863 when he remarked that the recently deceased Gen. "Stonewall" Jackson should be buried "in a gum coffin, and that the bottom plank might be very thin, so that he might eat his way down to where it was intended that he should go." Soon thereafter, he fled into the woods and briefly organized a band of unionist partisans, or Jayhawkers, to attack rebel supply trains. In November, he left the woods and moved to Union-occupied New Orleans.

By 1864, Union troops controlled all or part of 17 parishes in south Louisiana. Wells formed the Unconditional Union Club of West Louisiana. He was nominated both by radicals such as Benjamin Flanders and moderates such as Michael Hahn, to be Lieutenant Governor.

== Statewide office ==
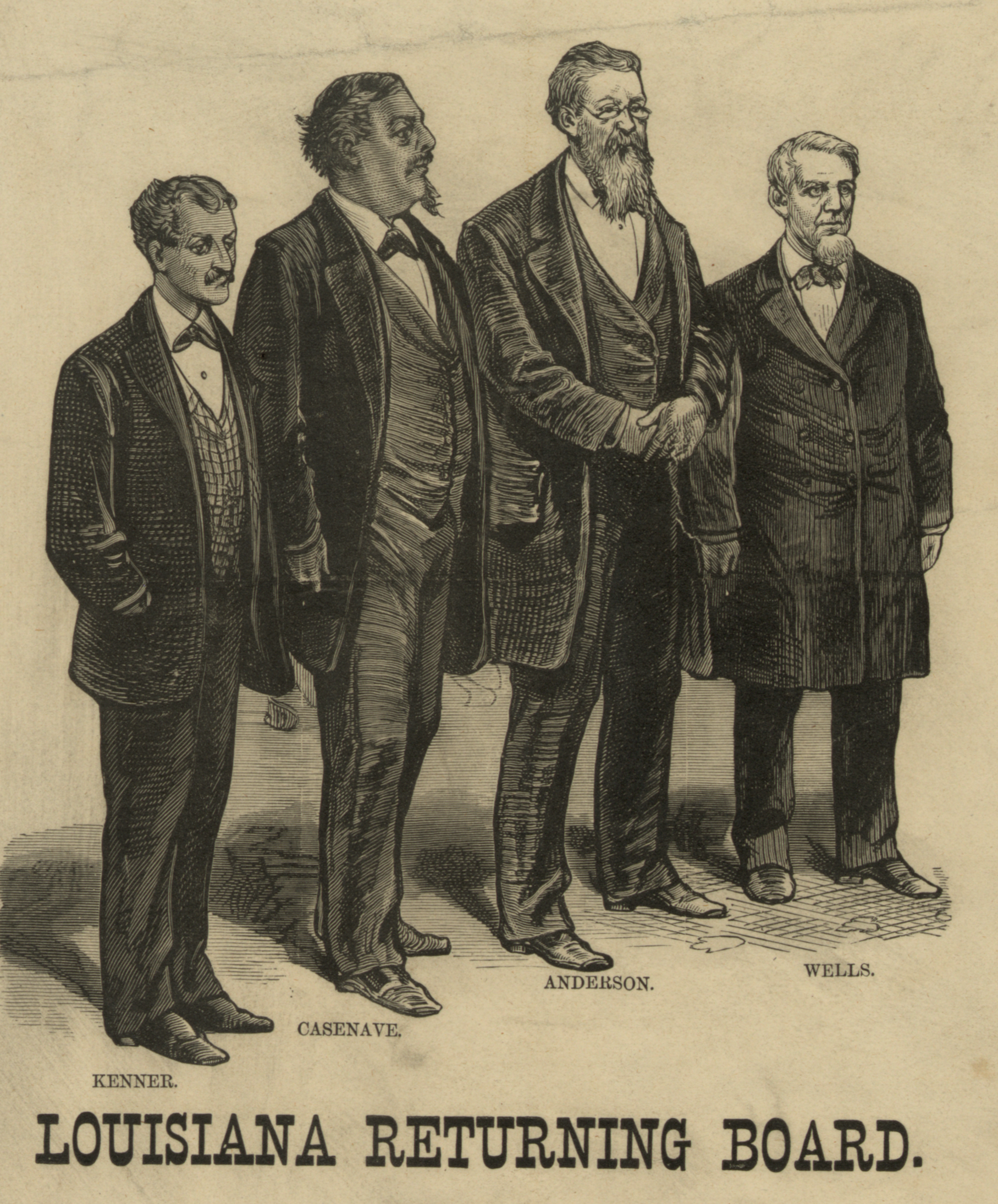
Engraving of Wells along with Returning Board members Louis M. Kenner, Gardene Casanave, and Thomas C. Anderson, 1877.

On March 4, 1864, Wells became lieutenant governor under Governor Michael Hahn. He supported compensated emancipation for former slaves at the Louisiana Constitutional Convention of 1864. One year later, on March 4, 1865, Wells was inaugurated as governor when Michael Hahn resigned to become a United States Senator. In November 1865, a special election was held under the Reconstruction government, and Governor Wells running as a Democrat defeated former Governor Henry W. Allen (who was in Mexico), with 22,312 votes to Allen's 5,497. As governor, Wells removed radicals from office.

Wells came into conflict with the federal military authority under General Nathaniel P. Banks. He supported Hugh Kennedy as New Orleans mayor and appointed numerous former Confederate officers to state and local offices. He recommended dismantling public education and using only taxes from blacks to pay for freedmen's schools. Wells also wanted to build new levees, a new capitol building, and a state penitentiary, but the Louisiana State Legislature balked at his proposals.

The political power of former Confederates grew unchecked during Wells administration until the residents of New Orleans returned the city's Confederate mayor, John T. Monroe, to office in 1866. Governor Wells responded by endorsing the Radical plan to enfranchise blacks by reconvening the constitutional convention. On July 30, 1866, the twenty-five delegates brave enough to assembled and a procession of black supporters were attacked by a white mob including members of the city policy. Thirty-four blacks and three white Radicals were killed before federal troops arrived. Governor Wells did little to prevent violence, and General Philip Sheridan held him responsible. Sheridan removed him from office on June 3, 1867, for the riots and for failing to implement reforms regarding freedmen.

== Later years ==
After being removed as governor, Wells went home to Rapides Parish. In 1872 he supported Republican President Ulysses S. Grant's re-election. During the 1870s Wells returned to politics as a "scalawag" and was known by opponents as "Mad Wells." In 1873, he was appointed chairman of the State Returning Board, which was responsible for determining the legality of ballots and for discarding fraudulent votes. In this, Wells helped Republicans regain some of the votes it lost to white Democrats' anti-Black violence and terror. He was consequently appointed Surveyor of the Port of New Orleans (Customs) from 1874 to 1880.

He died on February 28, 1899, at his residence in Rapides Parish, at the age of 91.

== Sources ==
- Political Graveyard
- National Governor's Association biography
- Walter M. Lowrey, "The Political Career of James Madison Wells," Louisiana Historical Quarterly, 31 (October, 1948), pp. 995–1,123, Louisiana Historical Society.

Party political offices
Preceded by Michael Hahn	Republican nominee for Governor of Louisiana; 1865	Succeeded by Henry C. Warmoth
Political offices
Preceded by Benjamin W. Pearce	Lieutenant Governor of Louisiana; 1864–1865	Succeeded by Albert Voorhies
Preceded by Michael Hahn	Governor of Louisiana; 1865–1867	Succeeded by Benjamin Flanders
