= 1864 Louisiana gubernatorial election =

1864 Louisiana gubernatorial election (Union)
- February 22, 1864
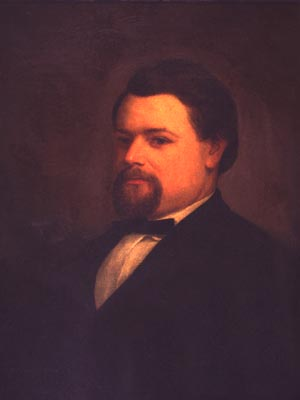

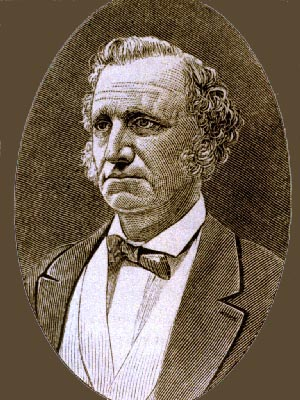
Nominee	Michael Hahn	J. Q. A. Fellows	Benjamin Flanders
Party	Free State Republican	Conservative Union	Radical Republican
Popular vote	6,158	2,720	1,847
Percentage	57.42%	25.36%	17.22%
- Results by parish Hahn: 50–60% 60–70% 90–100% Fellows: 40–50% 60–70% 70–80% 90–100% Flanders: 30–40% No data/vote
Governor before election
George F. Shepley
Military
Elected Governor
Michael Hahn
Republican

The 1864 Louisiana gubernatorial election was held on February 22 under martial law in Union-controlled territory pursuant to the Proclamation of Amnesty and Reconstruction. As a result of the election, Michael Hahn became civilian governor of the recognized Union government of Louisiana, replacing military governor George F. Shepley.

According to historian Mark W. Summers, the 1864 election set the stage for the post-war political struggle over Reconstruction by establishing three factions of Unionists and alienating immigrants, slave owners, and secessionists, none of whom were permitted to participate in the military government and who would together form the basis of the post-war Louisiana Democratic Party.

== Background ==
In December 1863, along with his annual message to Congress, President Abraham Lincoln issued a proclamation declaring that whenever the voters of a state which had declared secession re-established a loyal state government, it should be recognized by the United States government. Under Lincoln's so-called ten percent plan, an election would be recognized if ten percent of the voting population in the state as of 1860 signed an oath pledging allegiance to the United States.

Following the capture of New Orleans by Benjamin Butler in 1862, the Union Army had quickly captured several parishes along the Mississippi River and established martial law. Under the military government, led by commander of the Department of the Gulf Nathaniel P. Banks, Unionists revived their citizenship and rebel leadership fled. Therefore, loyalty to the Union was not an issue that any political faction could capitalize on. Instead, factions were divided primarily by their positions on emancipation and racial equality. While Union forces did emancipate many slaves in Louisiana, they were not given the right to vote or hold office.

Historian Mark W. Summers identified three political factions in Union-controlled Louisiana, each of which nominated a candidate for Governor in 1864:

- Radical Republicans, led by Thomas J. Durant, Benjamin F. Flanders, and W. R. Crane favored equal civil rights. All three men were former Democrats, that having been the egalitarian party in the pre-war political order, though Durant and Crane were supporters of Stephen A. Douglas who had been politically marginalized prior to the war.
- Free State Republicans, led by Michael Hahn and J. Madison Wells, were moderates aligned with the military government. They accepted emancipation but did not go beyond it in support of freedmen.
- Conservative Unionists, including pre-war members of the Know Nothing movement, the Constitutional Union Party and Unionist Democrats, supported the Union but balked at emancipation until the preservation of slavery became impossible, at which point they supported compensation for Unionist slaveholders. Within the Conservative Union faction, members were divided over how to treat the Confederate rebels, with positions on a spectrum from full and unconditional amnesty to harsh requirements for reconciliation.

== Candidates ==
- John Quincy Adams Fellows (Conservative Union)
- Benjamin Flanders, former U.S. Representative from New Orleans (Republican)
- Michael Hahn, former U.S. Representative from New Orleans (Free-State)

== Campaign ==
Hahn campaigned by purchasing the New Orleans True Delta, a pro-slavery newspaper, and converting it into a platform for moderate Reconstruction and abolition. He was opposed by Benjamin Franklin Flanders, a Radical critic of the Lincoln plan, and J.Q.A. Fellows, a Conservative. By steering a middle path between the Conservatives and Radicals, the Free State ticket of Hahn and J. Madison Wells won the election.

== Results ==
1864 Louisiana gubernatorial election
Party	Candidate	Votes	%
Free State Republican	Michael Hahn	6,158	57.42%
Conservative Union	J. Q. A. Fellows	2,720	25.36%
Radical Republican	Benjamin Flanders	1,847	17.22%
Total votes		10 725	100.00%

== Aftermath ==
Hahn was inaugurated as governor on March 4, in an elaborate ceremony funded by General Banks which received national attention as a symbol of Reconstruction and reunion.

On March 28, General Banks summoned a new constitutional convention on orders from President Lincoln, consistent with the ten percent plan. The convention began on April 9 at Gallier Hall in New Orleans, the site of the secession convention of 1861, and lasted until July 25. The convention was dominated by the Free State faction and noted for absenteeism, free liquor and cigars, and other extravagances, resulting in total costs of over $250,000. Hahn played a leading role in the convention, but he was opposed by Stephen A. Hurlbut, who had replaced Banks as commander of the Department of the Gulf.

The resulting Louisiana Constitution of 1864 abolished slavery in Louisiana, granted suffrage to all white males, allocated tax revenues to the education of both black and white children, separately, and established a minimum wage and nine-hour workday. However, it did not address voting or civil rights for newly freed people and only applied within the territory controlled by the Union Army at the time. At the insistence of General Banks, the new constitution allowed the legislature to consider the issue of universal suffrage. The constitution was designed to appeal to the conservative and working-class groups of New Orleans, where political power within Union-controlled territory rested, but excluded immigrants, slave owners, and secessionists, who had no power under the Union military government and would form the basis of the post-war Democratic Party.

General Hurlbut further declined to recognize the new Constitution or Hahn's authority as civilian governor. After one year in office, Hahn resigned on March 4, 1865 to accept election to the United States Senate and was succeeded by Lieutenant Governor James Madison Wells. The radical United States Congress, which opposed Lincoln's moderate plan, particularly after his assassination in April, refused to seat Hahn or any other Senator from a readmitted Confederate state.

Preceded by 1863 Louisiana gubernatorial election (Confederate)	Louisiana gubernatorial elections	Succeeded by 1865 Louisiana gubernatorial election
