= Miles Taylor (politician) =

Nineteenth-century U.S. politician

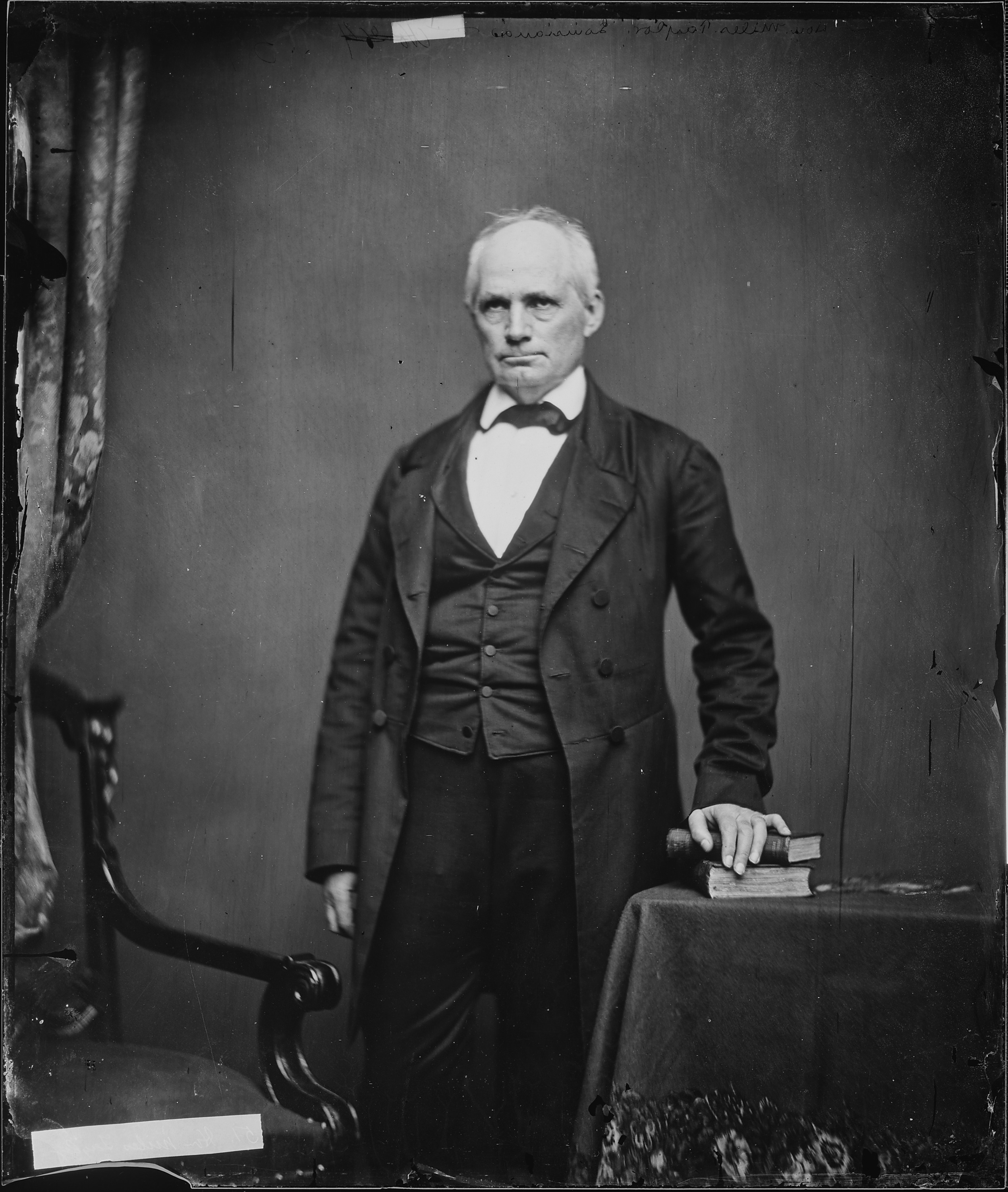

Member of the U.S. House of Representatives from Louisiana's 2nd district
- In office March 4, 1855 – February 5, 1861
- Preceded by: Theodore Gaillard Hunt
- Succeeded by: Michael Hahn

Personal details
- Born: July 16, 1805 Saratoga Springs, New York, US
- Died: September 23, 1873 (aged 68) Saratoga Springs, New York, US
- Party: Democratic
- Spouse: Eliza Ann Bruden

Miles Taylor (July 16, 1805 – September 23, 1873) was a member of the U.S. House of Representatives representing the state of Louisiana. He served three terms as a Democrat. On February 5, 1861, shortly after Louisiana seceded from the Union, Taylor resigned his seat in Congress, announcing that "the whole South would rise up to a man to resist" efforts by the Federal government to control slavery.

Taylor was born in Saratoga Springs, New York. He served in Congress from 1855, until Louisiana's secession from the Union. He died in Saratoga Springs, New York, and was buried in the family graveyard at his plantation, Front Scattery, near Belle Alliance, Louisiana. Scattery Plantation was sold in parcels and there does not seem to be any cemetery there now.

== Personal life ==
On May 21, 1838, he married Eliza Ann Bruden, age 19 of Mississippi at Terrebonne Parish, Louisiana. She died in 1850. They had four children:

- John (b. 1839)
- Mary (Taylor) May (living 1891 as a widow in New Orleans}
- Thomas (c. 1843 – October 11, 1907, Cassanova Virginia) who served in 8th Louisiana Regiment CSA);
- Searing (c. 1845 – February 25, 1891, Saint Emma Plantation, age 45) who served as a "special agent" for the Confederate Government.

== Notes ==
U.S. House of Representatives
Preceded by Theodore Gaillard Hunt	Member of the U.S. House of Representatives from Louisiana's 2nd congressional district 1855 – 1861	Succeeded by Michael Hahn under Union occupation in 1863
