= Louisiana secession =

US Civil war event

The U.S. state of Louisiana declared that it had seceded from the United States on January 26, 1861. It then announced that it had joined the Confederate States (C.S.); Louisiana was the sixth slave state to declare that it had seceded from the U.S. and joined the C.S.

== Ordinance of secession ==
AN ORDINANCE to dissolve the union between the State of Louisiana and other States united with her under the compact entitled "The Constitution of the United States of America."

We, the people of the State of Louisiana, in convention assembled, do declare and ordain, and it is hereby declared and ordained, That the ordinance passed by us in convention on the November 22, in the year eighteen hundred and eleven, whereby the Constitution of the United States of America and the amendments of the said Constitution were adopted, and all laws and ordinances by which the State of Louisiana became a member of the Federal Union, be, and the same are hereby, repealed and abrogated; and that the union now subsisting between Louisiana and other States under the name of "The United States of America" is hereby dissolved.

We do further declare and ordain, That the State of Louisiana hereby resumes all rights and powers heretofore delegated to the Government of the United States of America; that her citizens are absolved from all allegiance to said Government; and that she is in full possession and exercise of all those rights of sovereignty which appertain to a free and independent State.

We do further declare and ordain, That all rights acquired and vested under the Constitution of the United States, or any act of Congress, or treaty, or under any law of this State, and not incompatible with this ordinance, shall remain in force and have the same effect as if this ordinance had not been passed.

Adopted in convention at Baton Rouge this January 26, 1861.

== Civil War era ==
=== Road to war ===
The Civil War came after years of struggle over the issue of slavery. Louisiana's political leaders hoped the Missouri Compromise and the Compromise of 1850 would protect slavery and preserve the Union. But the state's planters saw the increasing pressure from abolitionists as an economic threat. Louisiana, like the other states, could not see the desolation that lay ahead when it entered a war expected to last only a few weeks.

=== Election of 1860 ===
The pressure of the slavery issue split the Democratic Party convention wide open and led to a presidential election in 1860 with four candidates. Northern delegates to the Democratic Party convention supported Stephen A. Douglas of Illinois, but the southern Democrats disagreed with his position on slavery, which they felt was not pro-slavery enough. The extremists among the southern Democrats, labeled "Fire-Eaters" because of their strong pro-slavery speeches, led a walkout at the convention. They then held their own convention and named John C. Breckinridge of Kentucky as their candidate. Another faction of southerners with hopes to preserve the Union, which included many former Whigs, formed the Constitutional Union Party and nominated John C. Bell of Tennessee as a moderate compromise candidate. To many white Southerners, a Republican was the enemy and a threat to their (slave-based) way of life. The Republican Party did not even exist in Louisiana, so Lincoln's name was not on the ballot there. The new president of the United States had not received one vote in the state. Lincoln's election brought an immediate reaction. One New Orleans newspaper said the Republican Party opposed the "dignity, interest, and well-being of Louisiana." Another predicted, "You might as well try to breathe life into a mummy of Ancient Egypt as to expect the Union to be preserved." The South was filled with talk of secession. The cry for secession spread as quickly as a yellow fever epidemic, and the results were just as deadly. But in 1860 Louisianians could not see what lay ahead. They heard speeches loaded with words like honor, self-respect, and principle. They heard Lincoln labeled a "black Republican Abolitionist" who would end their (slavery-based) way of life. In St. Charles Parish, a man was ordered to leave because he cheered on Lincoln. A Bostonian piano manufacturer in Shreveport was advised to leave town because he was a known Lincoln supporter.

=== Secession ===
The flag of Louisiana in February 1861

On January 26, 1861, the Secession Convention voted 113 to 17 to adopt the Ordinance of Secession. Judge James G. Taliaferro of Catahoula Parish was the most outspoken opponent. He warned the secession threatened the interests and destiny of Louisiana, He predicted war, ruin, and decline. His opinion, however, was not included in the official record of the proceedings. Most of the state's citizens celebrated secession. Pine torches lighted a night parade in New Orleans. The governor called for homes and businesses to put lights in their windows to show their support. People cheered in the streets as fireworks exploded and cannons fired. Louisiana called itself a country for less than two weeks. On February 4, 1861, the State of Louisiana joined the Confederate States of America, the new nation formed by the southern states that seceded. The newly formed Confederate government gained the political skills of Louisiana's ex-United States senators. Judah P. Benjamin, called the "brains of the Confederacy", served in Confederate President Jefferson Davis's cabinet. John Slidell spent most of the war trying to persuade European nations to support the Confederacy. Louisiana also contributed four key generals to the Confederate army – Braxton Bragg, Leonidas Polk, Richard Taylor, and P. G. T. Beauregard.

=== Building an army ===
The Confederacy needed an army. Louisiana responded immediately with 5,000 volunteers. Around the state, they organized themselves into companies. They chose names like the Louisiana Swamp Rangers, Crescent City Guards, Vienna Rifles, Irish Brigade, Carondelet Invincibles, Franklin Sharpshooters, and Caddo Greys. These names and their colorful uniforms seemed suitable for the short and glorious war southerners expected. They would "teach the Yankee a lesson... and settle matters within 60 days." The spirited soldiers drilled to "save the South." Camp Walker, located at the Metairie Race Track, became the first training site. The last horse race was run there on April 9, 1861. Soon afterward the grounds were covered with marching soldiers preparing for a very different contest. The camp, although close to New Orleans, was soon abandoned. Surrounded by swamp and with no safe drinking water, the camp was a poor location for an army.

An area to the north of Lake Pontchartrain attracted the Confederate commanders to a site with hills, tall pines, and good water. Camp Moore became the main training location for Louisiana's soldiers. But life in any training camp was difficult. Providing adequate food and supplies was a constant problem. Diseases spread quickly through the troops. Epidemics such as measles killed many soldiers before they ever left the camp. Once war became the ugly reality of blood and death, fewer men wanted to enlist. When the first soldiers left home, they expected to return quickly. Instead, the war dragged on and families suffered. To encourage enlistment, the Confederate government paid a bounty and some local governments paid additional bounties. The bounty was a one-time reward for enlisting. Finally, the Confederacy did not have enough volunteers. A draft or conscription required all men of a certain age to enlist in the army. The conscription law included a substitution clause, which allowed men to pay someone else to take his place. Newspapers carried the names of men who were willing to serve as substitutes. The Confederate draft also exempted anyone owning twenty or more slaves through the so-called "Twenty Slave Law"; this exemption and the right to pay a substitute seemed to aim the conscription law at the poor man. Soldiers on both sides called the Civil War "a rich man's war and a poor man's fight."

=== Gathering supplies ===
In 1861, Louisiana was ready for war in the only attitude. Both motivations alone were not enough. The focus shifted fanatically to equipment and supplies. In the early days of the war, equipment and supplies were furnished by parish governments, wealthy individuals, or the soldiers themselves. Although Louisiana imported most finished goods, some manufacturing did exist. A New Orleans factory switched from making clothing for plantations to making uniforms. Converted factories made weapons from scrap iron collected by citizens. Ranches in southwest Louisiana and Texas supplied the cattle for a slaughterhouse south of Alexandria. The beef was preserved by salting it. This method left the meat tough and very salty, and the soldiers had to boil the meat for hours before they could eat it. They learned to ignore the bugs floating on the water. The salt for preserving the beef came from several salt deposits around the state. Brine was pumped out of the ground and boiled down in kettles to get the salt. Discovering the extensive salt deposits at Avery Island gave the Confederates a valuable source. The women of Louisiana also helped "The Cause." Ladies' sewing circles made uniforms and cartridge bags. Their new sewing machines became part of assembly lines. But too soon the ladies stopped designing battle flags and began making bandages. Monogrammed linen pillowcases became sandbags at Port Hudson, and treasured carpets became blankets for freezing soldiers.

== First governor of independent Louisiana ==
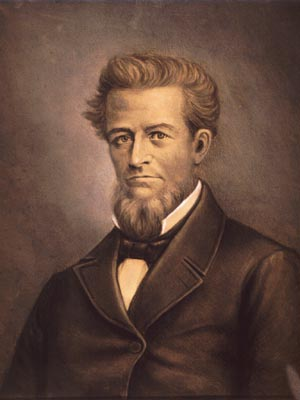
Thomas Overton Moore

Thomas Overton Moore was elected Democratic governor of Louisiana in November 1859. He took the oath of office on January 23, 1860. In his inaugural address, Moore told the legislators and visitors at the Capitol that a powerful anti-slavery party (i.e. the Republican Party) in the Northern free states threatened the existence of the slave-holding states:

So bitter is this hostility felt toward slavery, which these fifteen states regard as a great social and political blessing, that it exhibits itself in legislation for the avowed purpose of destroying the rights of slaveholders guaranteed by the Constitution and protected by the Acts of Congress... [in] the North, a widespread sympathy with felons has deepened the distrust in the permanent Federal Government, and awakened sentiments favorable to a separation of states.

On January 8, 1861, Governor Moore ordered the Louisiana militia to occupy the Federal arsenal at Baton Rouge and the Federal forts guarding New Orleans, Jackson and St. Philip. A wealthy planter and slaveholder, Moore acted aggressively to engineer the secession of Louisiana from the Union by a convention on January 23. After the ordinance of secession passed the convention on January 26, 1861, Moore placed Colonel Braxton Bragg in command of the state military.

Governor Moore held office from 1860 through early 1864. When war erupted, he unsuccessfully lobbied the Confederate government in Richmond for a strong defense of New Orleans. Two days before the city surrendered in April 1862, Moore and the legislature abandoned Baton Rouge as the state capital, relocating to Opelousas on May 1, 1862.

Governor Moore began to organize military resistance at the state level, ordered the burning of cotton, cessation of trade with the Union forces, and heavily recruited troops for the state militia. However, despite a brief check at Baton Rouge, Union forces continued to advance into Louisiana and up the Mississippi, and the capital was moved again to Shreveport.

== New Orleans ==
New Orleans, Louisiana, the largest city in the entire South, was strategically important as a port city due to its location along the Mississippi River and its access to the Gulf of Mexico, and the United States War Department very early on planned on its capture. It was taken by U.S. troops on April 25, 1862. Because a large part of the population had Union sympathies (or compatible commercial interests), the U.S. government took the unusual step of designating the areas of Louisiana then under U.S. control as a state within the Union, with its own elected representatives to the U.S. Congress. For the latter part of the war, both the Union and the Confederacy recognized their own distinct Louisianan governors.

== Notable Civil War leaders ==
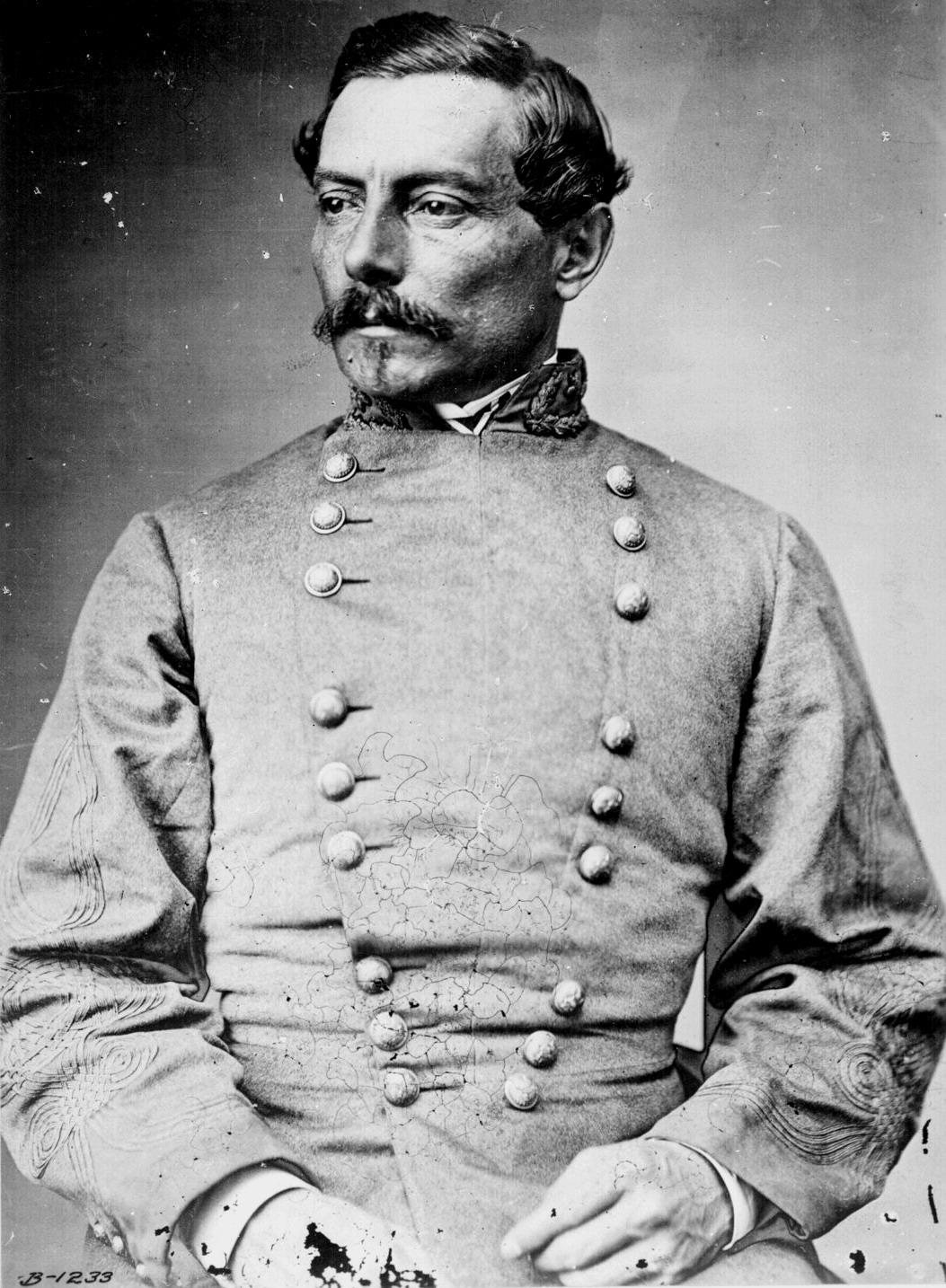
Gen.
P.G.T. Beauregard

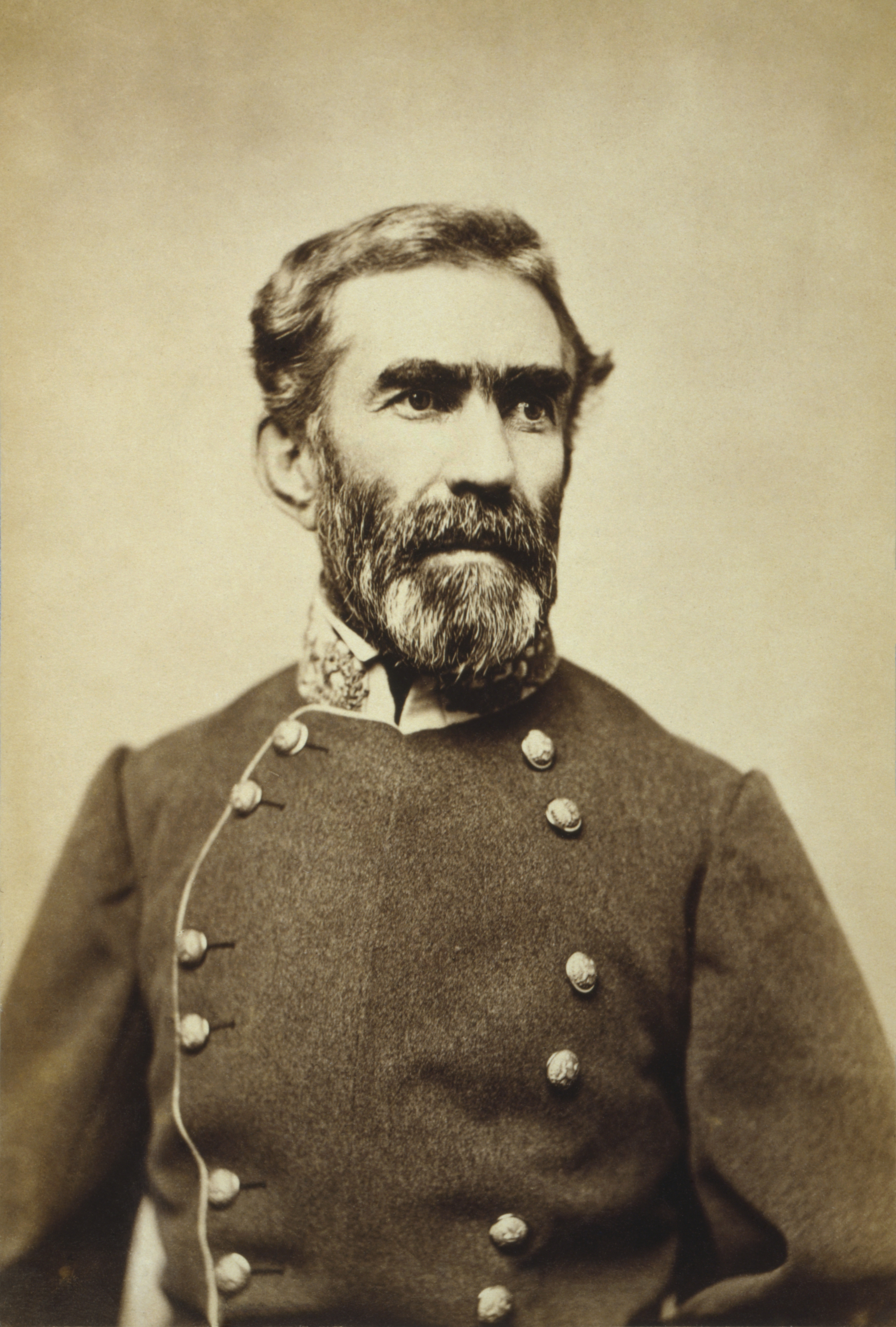
Gen.
Braxton Bragg

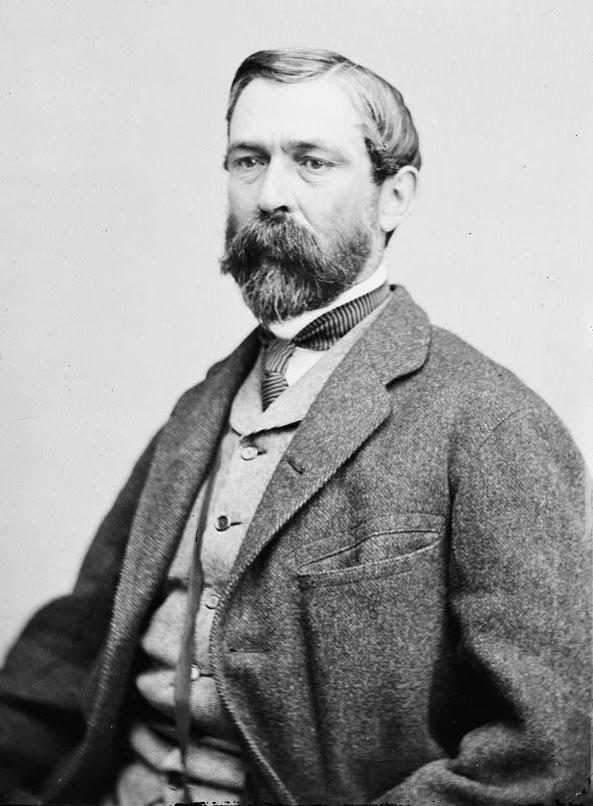
Lt. Gen.
Richard Taylor

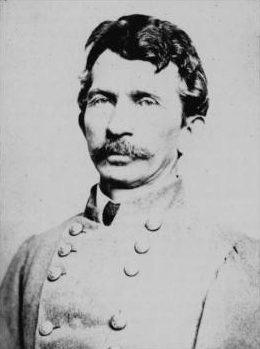
Brig. Gen. and Gov.
Henry W. Allen

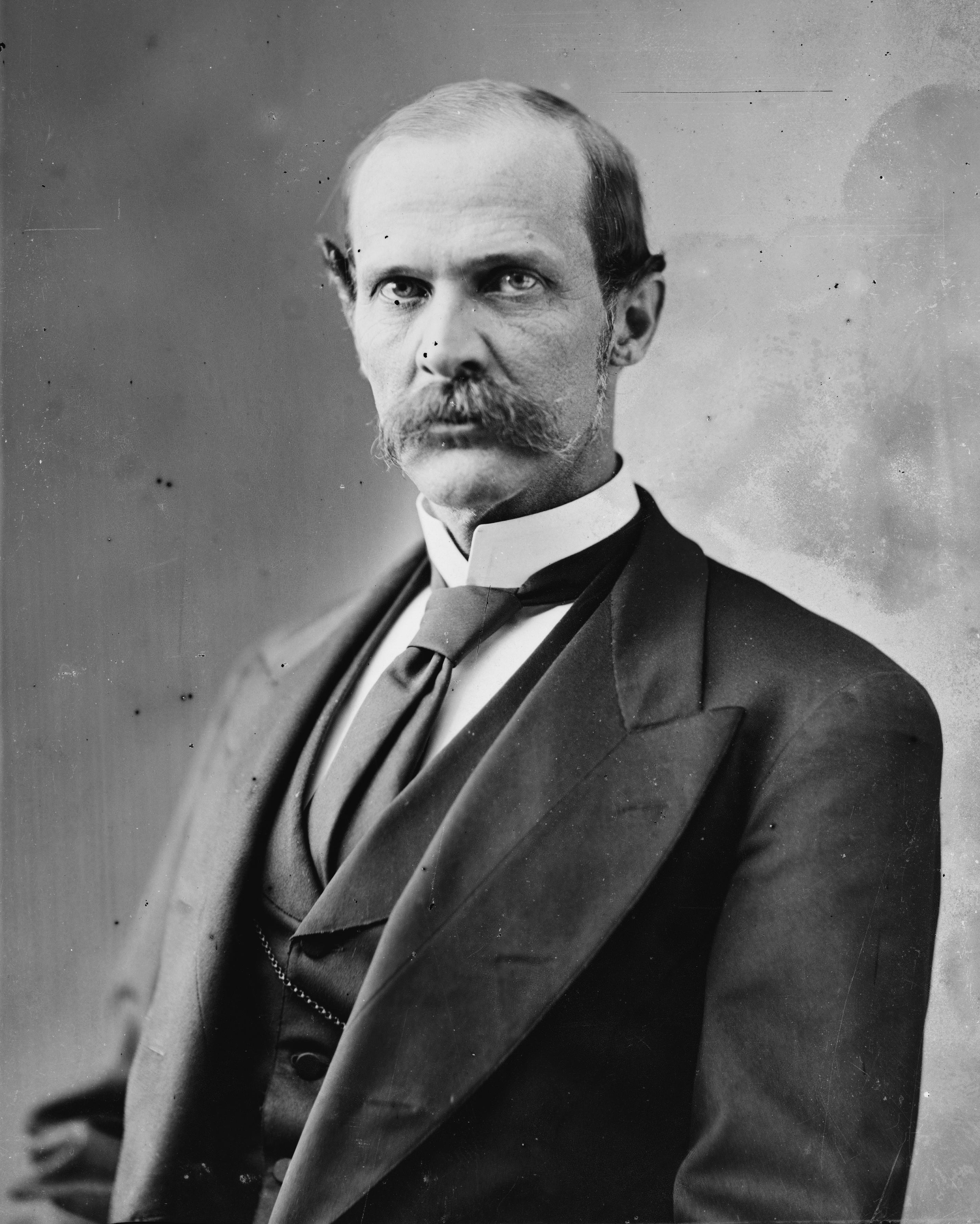
Brig. Gen.
Randall L. Gibson

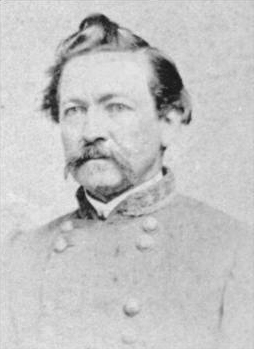
Brig. Gen.
Harry T. Hays

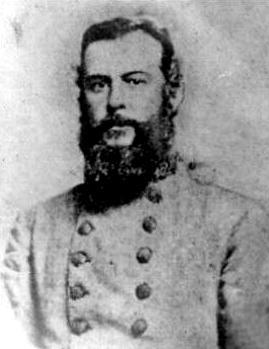
Brig. Gen.
Alfred Mouton

== Bibliography ==
- Campbell, Anne (2007). Louisiana: The History of an American State. Clairmont Press. ISBN 978-1567331356.
- Dew, Charles B. "Who Won the Secession Election in Louisiana?." Journal of Southern History (1970): 18-32. in JSTOR
- Dew, Charles B. "The Long Lost Returns: The Candidates and Their Totals in Louisiana's Secession Election." Louisiana History (1969): 353-369. in JSTOR
- Hearn, Chester G. (1995). The Capture of New Orleans 1862. Louisiana State University Press. ISBN 0-8071-1945-8.
- Lathrop, Barnes F. "The Lafourche District in 1861-1862: A Problem in Local Defense." Louisiana History (1960) 1#2 pp: 99-129. in JSTOR
- Pierson, Michael D. Mutiny at Fort Jackson: The Untold Story of the Fall of New Orleans (Univ of North Carolina Press, 2008)
- Sledge, Christopher L. "The Union's Naval War in Louisiana, 1861-1863" (Army Command and General Staff College, 2006) online
- Winters, John D. (1963). The Civil War in Louisiana. Baton Rouge: Louisiana State University Press. ISBN 0-8071-0834-0.
- Wooster, Ralph. "The Louisiana Secession Convention." Louisiana Historical Quarterly (1951) 34#1 pp: 103-133.
