= Henry M. Hyams =

American politician (1806–1875)

Henry Michael Hyams

7th Lieutenant Governor of Louisiana
- In office 1860–1864
- Governor: Thomas Overton Moore
- Preceded by: William F. Griffin
- Succeeded by: Benjamin W. Pearce

Member of the Louisiana Senate
- In office 1855

Personal details
- Born: March 4, 1806 Charleston, South Carolina
- Died: June 25, 1875 (aged 69) New Orleans, Louisiana
- Resting place: Lafayette Cemetery, New Orleans, Louisiana
- Party: Democratic Party
- Spouse: Laurel Matilda Smith
- Occupation: Lawyer, politician

Henry Michael Hyams (March 4, 1806 – June 25, 1875) was an American lawyer, planter and Democratic politician. He served as the seventh lieutenant governor of Louisiana from 1860 to 1864 under Governor Thomas Overton Moore during the American Civil War, when Louisiana joined the Confederate States of America. He was an advocate of slavery in the United States.

== Early life ==
Henry M. Hyams was born on March 4, 1806, in Charleston, South Carolina. His cousin was Judah P. Benjamin (1811–1884).

== Career ==
Hyams worked for the Canal Bank in Donaldsonville, Louisiana. He was admitted to the Louisiana bar in 1830, and he joined the law firm Dunbar and Elgee in Alexandria, Louisiana, becoming one of the first Jews living in Alexandria. He also operated a plantation.

Hyams moved to New Orleans, Louisiana, in 1853, where he practised the law. He then served as a clerk of the District Court of Natchitoches Parish, Louisiana. He was elected to the Louisiana State Senate as a Democrat in 1855. He then served as the Lieutenant Governor of Louisiana from 1862 to 1864.

Hyams supported slavery. Indeed, as early as the 1830s, he joined a vigilante group to defend the institution of slavery.

== Personal life and death ==
Hyams was an observant Jew. He married Laurel Matilda Smith and had thirteen children. His son, Henry M. Hyams Jr. (1846–1887), became a lawyer and practiced law in New Orleans.

Hyams died on June 25, 1875, in New Orleans, Louisiana. His funeral was held by Rabbi James Koppel Gutheim, and he was buried in Lafayette Cemetery in New Orleans. His obituary in The Times-Picayune described him as "a standard-bearer of the ancient regime."

Political offices
Preceded by William F. Griffin	Lieutenant Governor of Louisiana; 1860-1864	Succeeded by Benjamin W. Pearce
