= 1863 Louisiana gubernatorial election =

1863 Louisiana gubernatorial election (Confederate)
- November 2, 1863
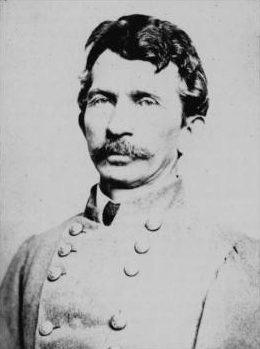
Nominee	Henry Watkins Allen
Party	Democratic
Popular vote	8,037
Percentage	88.26%
- County results Allen: 50–60% 60–70% 70–80% 80–90% 90–100% No Election
Governor before election
Thomas Overton Moore
Democratic
Elected Governor
Henry Watkins Allen
Democratic

The 1863 Louisiana gubernatorial (Confederate) election was the fourth election to take place under the Louisiana Constitution of 1852. As a result of this election Henry Watkins Allen became Governor of Confederate-controlled Louisiana.

== Results ==
Popular Vote

Party	Candidate	Votes received	Percentage
Democratic	Henry Watkins Allen	8,037	88.26%
	Leroy Augustus Stafford	806	8.85%
	J.W. Macdonald	226	2.48%
	Others	37	0.41%

Preceded by 1859 Louisiana gubernatorial election	Louisiana gubernatorial elections	Succeeded by 1864 Louisiana gubernatorial election (Union)
