= Henry Watkins Allen =

American politician (1820–1866)

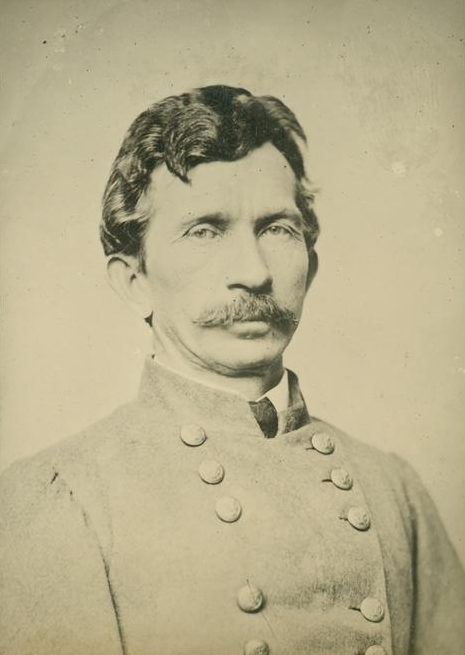

17th Governor of Louisiana
- In office January 25, 1864 – June 2, 1865
- Lieutenant: Benjamin W. Pearce
- Preceded by: Thomas Overton Moore
- Succeeded by: James Madison Wells

Member of the Louisiana House of Representatives
- In office 1853–1860

Member of the Mississippi House of Representatives
- In office 1845–1847

Personal details
- Born: April 29, 1820 Farmville, Virginia
- Died: April 22, 1866 (aged 45) Mexico City, Mexico
- Party: Democratic
- Other political affiliations: American (until 1859)
- Spouse: Salome Crane

Military service
- Allegiance: Confederate States
- Branch/service: Confederate States Army
- Years of service: 1861–1864
- Rank: Brigadier General
- Commands: 4th Louisiana Infantry Regiment
- Battles/wars: American Civil War; Battle of Shiloh; Battle of Baton Rouge

Henry Watkins Allen (April 29, 1820 – April 22, 1866) was an American lawyer, soldier, and politician who served as the Governor of Confederate Louisiana. During the Civil War Allen served in the Confederate States Army, rising to the rank of brigadier general. He was later appointed as a military judge after suffering injuries in battle. He was elected to both the Mississippi and Louisiana State Legislatures before he was inaugurated as the 17th Governor of Louisiana, governing from Shreveport, the capital of the Confederate held area of the state.

== Early life ==
Henry Watkins Allen was born on April 29, 1820 in Farmville, Virginia into a Presbyterian family, the son of Dr. Thomas and Ann Watkins Allen. His father moved the family to Lexington, Missouri after Ann's death in 1830. While there, Allen worked for a time as a store clerk before he attended Marion College for two years. When he was seventeen, Allen ran away from home to Grand Gulf, Mississippi where he found employment as a teacher on a plantation. He also studied law during this time and was licensed to practice as an attorney in Mississippi on May 25, 1841.

In 1842, Allen moved to the newly independent Republic of Texas, serving briefly in Texan Army. He returned to Mississippi six months later and married Salome Ann Crane. Salome died in 1851 at the age of 25, and she is buried in Bruinsburg, Mississippi. In 1845, he was elected to the Mississippi state legislature where he served one term.

== Louisiana ==
In February 1852, Allen moved to Louisiana and along with William Nolan purchased Westover, a sugar cane plantation located in West Baton Rouge Parish. Three years later in 1855, the land was divided and split, with Nolan keeping the name Westover Plantation on his portion of land and Allen using the name Allendale Plantation for his portion of the property. He owned 125 slaves, expanded his territory to over 2,000 acres, and oversaw the construction of a railway to transport goods.

Allen was elected to the Louisiana legislature in 1853 and that same year, journeyed through the south. Writing about his travels, he published his letters in the Baton Rouge Comet under the pseudonym Guy Mannering. He studied law at Harvard University for a year before making a failed bid for the State Senate in 1855. After hearing about the outbreak of Italian Revolution, he travelled to Europe in 1859, intending to volunteer in the army of Giuseppe Garibaldi. The conflict had ended by the time Allen arrived and he instead toured Europe. He wrote a book about his travel which was published in 1861 as Travels of a Sugar Planter.

During his absence, Allen was re-elected to the state legislature. Although he had entered into politics as a member of the Know Nothing Party, it was around this time that he switched to the Democratic Party. He became a floor leader for the party.

== Civil War ==
After Abraham Lincoln's victory in the 1860 Presidential election and multiple southern states seceding from the United States, Louisiana Governor Thomas Moore authorized a secession convention set for January 1861. In 1860, Allen enlisted as a private in the Delta Rifle Company and was later promoted to lieutenant colonel of the 4th Louisiana Infantry Regiment. Before the secession convention met, Governor Moore ordered the Louisiana militia to seize federal forts and armories throughout the state. Allen took part in the seizure of the Baton Rouge arsenal, the federal fort at Berwick Bay, and was the commander of the garrison of Ship Island.

In early March 1862, he was promoted to colonel and marched to northern Mississippi where he served under the command of General Albert Sidney Johnson. As part of the Army of Mississippi, he moved into Tennessee and fought in the Battle of Shiloh where he was injured after being shot in the face. He was then stationed at Vicksburg where he commanded an ad hoc brigade consisting of elements of the 4th and 5th Louisiana Infantry Regiments. After the fall of New Orleans to Union forces, Major General Mansfield Lowell had ordered three batteries of heavy guns be dismantled and sent to Vicksburg. Allen was tasked with mounting them, but came under fire from the Union Navy during their construction. Allen oversaw the completion of the batteries after drawing his revolver and threatening to personally shoot anyone who abandoned their station.

During the Battle of Baton Rouge, Allen commanded a brigade and led the assault on Nims' battery. During the attack, he was severely injured in both legs from a cannon blast. Allen refused to allow a doctor to amputate one of his legs and he needed the use of crutches for the rest of his life. In early 1863, while recuperating, Allen served as military judge in Jackson, Mississippi and he suffered further injuries while escaping a hotel fire. He was promoted to the rank of brigadier general by the Confederate Congress and was assigned to Shreveport, then serving as the state capital of Confederate Louisiana, to organize paroled prisoners of war.

=== Governorship of Louisiana ===
Allen ran for governor in November 1863 after Governor Moore chose not to seek a second term. He was inaugurated at the Shreveport Court House on January 25, 1864. At this stage of the war, New Orleans, Baton Rouge, and many Louisiana parishes had been occupied by Union troops, and Confederate forces west of the Mississippi River had been cut off and isolated by Union victories. One of Allen's first acts was to open a trade route through Texas to Mexico in order to bypass the Union blockade. Through this route he exported cotton and sugar and imported medicine, clothing, dry goods, and other necessities. He established a unified currency and state run stores for citizens to purchase basic supplies at low cost. Allen also ordered a mineral survey of the state, but when the findings showed the Confederate areas of Louisiana were lacking in resources, he purchased a major share in the ironworks in Davis County, Texas. Allen established a state factory to produce cotton cloth, a commodity needed by both civilians and the military, and set up factories in Shreveport and Minden to produce low cost medicine.

Allen raised two battalions of Louisiana militia and sent them to assist the Army of Western Louisiana in their successful repulse of Union forces in the Red River Campaign. He initially wanted to continue fighting after hearing of General Robert E. Lee's surrender, but Louisiana surrendered a month later. Fearing execution, Allen fled to Mexico and urged civilians to "submit to the inevitable" and comply with the Union in his farewell address.

== After the Civil War ==
Parts of Allen's Allendale Plantation in Port Allen, Louisiana had burned down, including the Allendale sugar mill, during the American Civil War (1861–1865).

As the Union army forces started taking over Confederate Louisiana, military authorities declared Governor Allen an outlaw, punishable by death upon his capture. Historian John D. Winters, known for romanticizing the Confederacy and denigrating African Americans, wrote about Allen's leaving Louisiana to take refuge in Mexico:

"Before leaving he addressed a long letter to the people of Louisiana begging them to keep the peace and 'submit to the inevitable' and 'begin life anew' without whining or despair. The crippled governor then got into his ambulance while a group of friends, tears streaming from their eyes, told him good-by."

— Winters, page 426

With the Confederacy's end, James Madison Wells, who had been governor of Union-controlled Louisiana, became governor of the entire state. Allen moved to Mexico City and edited the Mexico Times, an English-language newspaper. In November 1865, a special election was held under the Reconstruction government, with Allen (already in Mexico) defeated by Wells, with 5,497 votes to Wells' 22,312.

== Death and legacy ==
Allen died in Mexico City on April 22, 1866, of a stomach disorder. Allen was initially buried at Mexico City National Cemetery and Memorial, however his body was returned to New Orleans 10 years later, for burial at Lafayette Cemetery. In 1885, 19 years after his death, Allen's remains were reinterred on the grounds in front of the Old Louisiana State Capitol in Baton Rouge, in a grave marked by a rose-colored obelisk.

Many things in Louisiana have been named after Allen, and in 2020 a debate opened up on the impact of Allen's legacy since he had been a Confederate official, enslaver, and opponent of Black political rights.

Allen Parish in western Louisiana is named for him, as is Port Allen, a small city on the west bank of the Mississippi River across from Baton Rouge. The neighborhood in which he lived in while in Shreveport was later named as Allendale.

The Henry Watkins Allen Camp #133, of the Sons of Confederate Veterans is named in his honor. Camp #435, Sons of Confederate Veterans, was chartered in 1903 as the Kirby Smith Camp, but the name was changed prior to 1935 to the Henry Watkins Allen Camp #435 in honor of Shreveport's famous resident. Camp #435 is no longer in existence.

Henry W. Allen Elementary School, a public school in New Orleans, is named for him. In 2021, the elementary school name was being debated for a name change based on Allen's controversial legacy. The building, which became a part of The Willow School and began serving as its middle school, was renamed after Ellis Marsalis Jr.

A statue of Allen (1962) by sculptor Angela Gregory is located in Port Allen. In July 2020, a proposal to remove the statue was presented to the West Baton Rouge Parish Council. The council voted 6-3 not to remove the statue. A maquette of Gregory's Allen statue can be found at the West Baton Rouge Museum. A bust of Allen, along with Lee, Jackson and Beauregard, is located on the Confederate memorial in front of the Caddo Parish Courthouse in Shreveport.

== See also ==
- List of American Civil War generals (Confederate)

Party political offices
Preceded by Thomas Overton Moore	Democratic nominee for Governor of Louisiana; 1863, 1865	Succeeded by James G. Taliaferro
Political offices
Preceded by Thomas Overton Moore	Confederate Governor of Louisiana; 1864–1865 with Union Governors George Foster Shepley, Michael Hahn, and James Madison Wells	Succeeded by James Madison Wells as Reconstruction Governor
