= 1866 New Orleans mayoral election =

The mayoral election of New Orleans, Louisiana for 1866 was won by John T. Monroe. This election and later actions by Mayor Monroe against black suffragists would result in the New Orleans massacre of 1866.

== Results ==
New Orleans mayoral election, 1866
John T. Monroe	3,469
James H. Moore	3,158
W. L. Robinson	33
George Purves	3
