= George Foster Shepley (judge) =

American judge & politician (1819–1878)

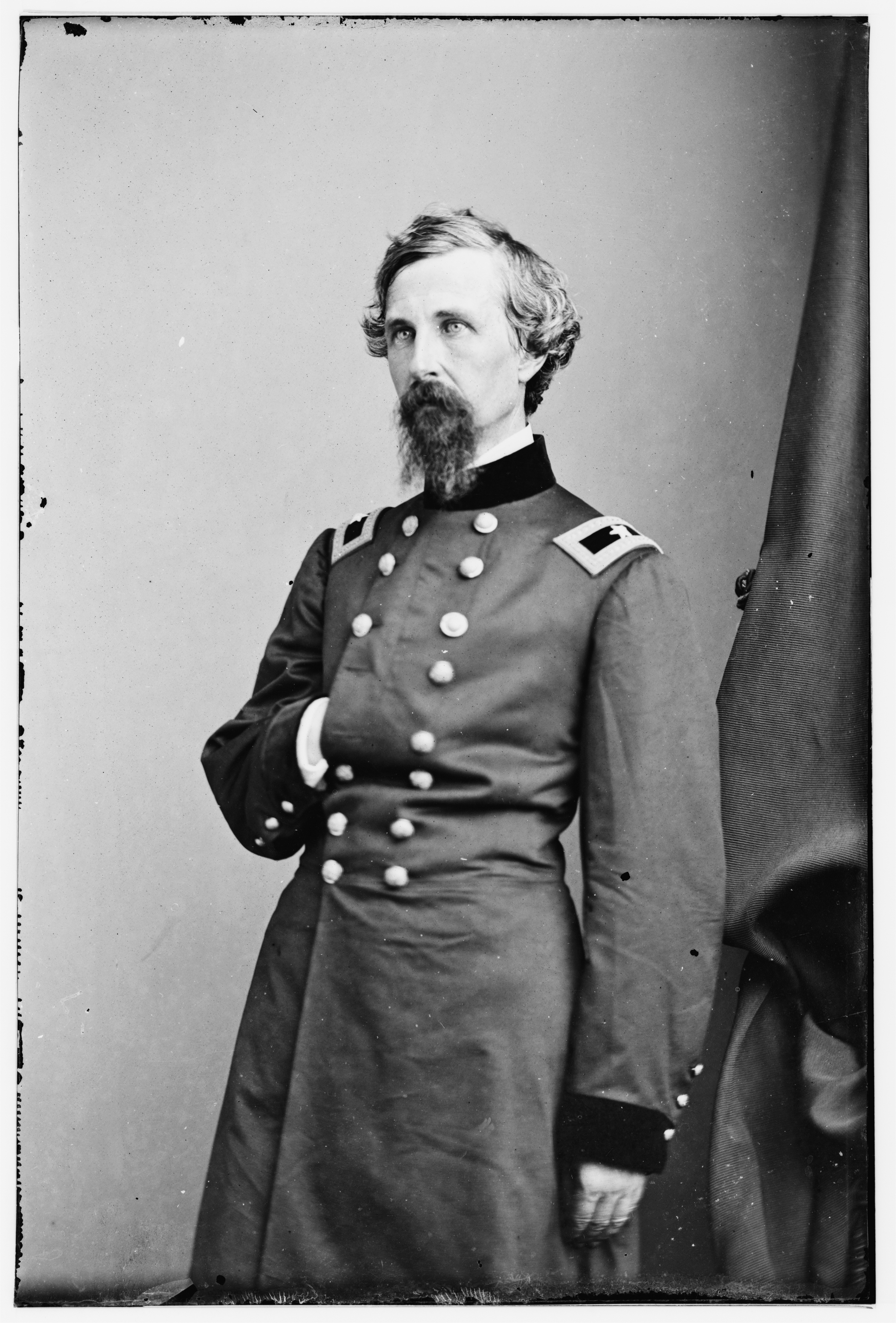

Judge of the United States Circuit Courts for the First Circuit
- In office December 22, 1869 – July 20, 1878
- Appointed by: Ulysses S. Grant
- Preceded by: Seat established by 16 Stat. 44
- Succeeded by: John Lowell

Military Governor of Richmond
- In office April 3, 1865 – July 3, 1865
- Preceded by: Joseph C. Mayo (Mayor)
- Succeeded by: David J. Saunders Sr. (Mayor)

18th Governor of Louisiana
- In office July 2, 1862 – March 4, 1864
- Preceded by: Thomas Overton Moore
- Succeeded by: Michael Hahn

Mayor of New Orleans (acting)
- In office May 20, 1862 – July 11, 1862
- Preceded by: John T. Monroe
- Succeeded by: Godfrey Weitzel (acting)

Personal details
- Born: January 1, 1819 Saco, Maine
- Died: July 20, 1878 (aged 59) Portland, Maine
- Resting place: Evergreen Cemetery; Portland, Maine
- Spouse(s): Lucy Ann Hayes; Helen Merrill
- Children: 5
- Education: Dartmouth College (A.B.)

Military service
- Allegiance: United States
- Branch/service: United States Army
- Years of service: 1861 - 1865
- Rank: Brigadier General
- Battles/wars: American Civil War

George Foster Shepley (January 1, 1819 – July 20, 1878) was an American attorney and Union General. During the Civil War he became the acting mayor of New Orleans in 1862, the military governor of Louisiana from 1862 until 1864 and the military governor of Richmond in 1865. After the war he was nominated as United States circuit judge of the United States Circuit Courts for the First Circuit.

== Early life ==
George Foster Shepley was born on January 1, 1819, in Saco, District of Maine, then part of the Massachusetts Commonwealth. Shepley graduated from Dartmouth College in 1837 and read law at Harvard with his father Senator Ethel Shepley. He began his private law practice in Bangor, Maine, from 1839 to 1844 and later in Portland, Maine from 1844 to 1861. He married Lucy Ann Hayes in 1844 with whom he had five children. After her death, he married Helen Merrill in 1872.

He served as the United States Attorney for the District of Maine from 1848 to 1849 but lost the position after Zachary Taylor was elected president. He was reappointed to the position in 1853 by President Franklin Pierce, a position he held until 1861.

== Civil War service ==
After the outbreak of war, Shepley was commissioned a Colonel of the 12th Maine Infantry Volunteers on November 16, 1861. He served under the command of General Benjamin Butler who had he befriended at the 1860 Democrat National Convention. He was assigned to the Department of the Gulf, commanding a brigade during the New Orleans campaign from April 18, 1862, to May 1, 1862. He was appointed as the acting mayor of New Orleans from May 1862 to July 1862.

Shepley was promoted to Brigadier General in command of the Third Brigade and was appointed as the Military Governor of Louisiana in July 1862. As governor he acted as an intermediary between Butler and citizens of the state and foreign diplomats. He was the spokesperson for the Federal government in the state and attempted appease citizen groups, decided civil cases, and supervised the provost marshal’s office. After Butler was replaced by Nathaniel Banks as head of the Department of the Gulf, Shepley lost most of the authority of his position. He was replaced as governor after Banks authorized a special election for the Union held areas of the state in 1864 and Michael Hahn was elected as the first civil governor since secession.

After leaving Louisiana, Shepley was assigned to the District of Eastern Virginia as chief of staff of XXV Corps, in the Army of the James. After the Union capture of Richmond, Shepley was appointed as military governor of Richmond, Virginia from April 3, 1865, to July 1, 1865. He resigned his commission in June 1865.

== Federal judicial service ==
After the war, Shepley returned to Maine where he continued his legal practice. He was offered a position on the United States Supreme Court but declined. He was nominated by President Ulysses S. Grant on December 8, 1869, to the United States Circuit Courts for the First Circuit, to a new seat authorized by 16 Stat. 44. He was confirmed by the United States Senate on December 22, 1869, and received his commission the same day. He served in this position until his death on July 20, 1878. He was interred at Evergreen Cemetery in Portland.

== See also ==
- List of American Civil War generals (Union)

== Sources ==
- State of Louisiana – Biography
- Cemetery Memorial by La-Cemeteries
- "16 Stat. 44" (PDF). United States Congress. April 10, 1869 – via Wikimedia Commons.

Political offices
Preceded by John T. Monroe	Mayor of New Orleans (acting); 1862	Succeeded by Godfrey Weitzel (acting)
Preceded by Thomas Overton Moore	Governor of Louisiana; 1862–1864	Succeeded by Michael Hahn
Preceded by Joseph C. Mayo as Mayor of Richmond	Military Governor of Richmond; 1865	Succeeded by David J. Saunders Sr. as Mayor of Richmond
Legal offices
Preceded by Seat established by 16 Stat. 44	Judge of the United States Circuit Courts for the First Circuit; 1869–1878	Succeeded by John Lowell
