= 1859 Louisiana gubernatorial election =

- November 7, 1859
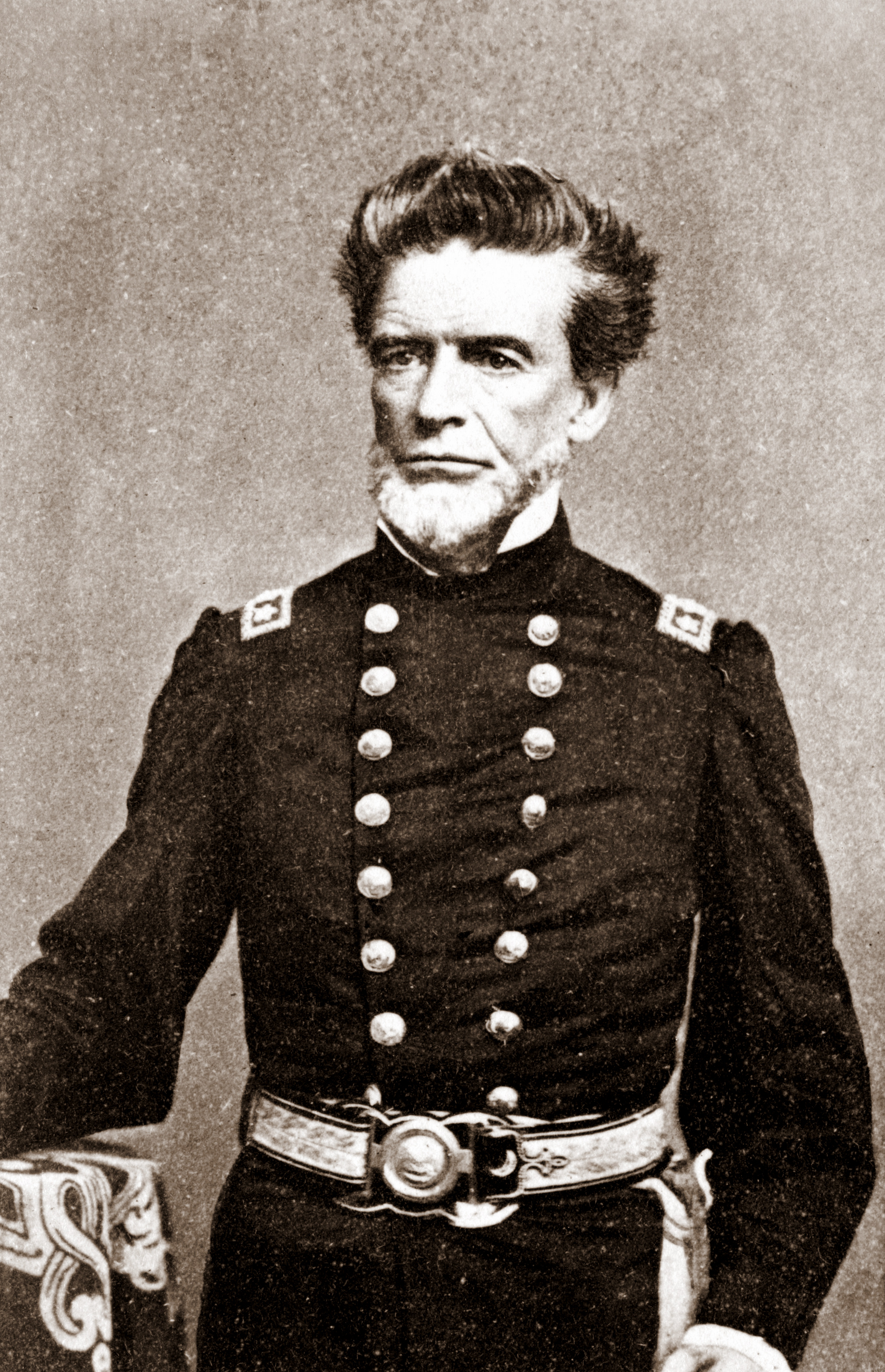

Nominee	Thomas Overton Moore	Thomas Jefferson Wells
Party	Democratic	Know Nothing
Popular vote	16,306	10,805
Percentage	60.15%	39.85%
- Parish Results; Moore: 50–60% 60–70% 70–80% 80–90% 90–100% Wells: 50–60%
Governor before election
Robert C. Wickliffe
Democratic
Elected Governor
Thomas Overton Moore
Democratic

The 1859 Louisiana gubernatorial election was the third election to take place under the Louisiana Constitution of 1852. Democrat Thomas Overton Moore ran against Know Nothing Thomas J. Wells for the position of Governor of Louisiana. Both men were friends and neighbors from Rapides Parish. Neither candidate actively campaigned and Moore went on vacation for a month during election season. The Democrat Moore won by a wide margin, and he would go on to lead his state in the 1860-61 secession crisis and the early years of the Civil War.

== Results ==
Popular Vote

Party	Candidate	Votes received	Percentage
Democratic	Thomas Overton Moore	16,306	60.15%
Know Nothing	Thomas Jefferson Wells	10,805	39.85%
Total Vote		27,111	

Preceded by 1855 Louisiana gubernatorial election	Louisiana gubernatorial elections	Succeeded by 1863 Louisiana gubernatorial election (Confederate)
