= 1855 Louisiana gubernatorial election =

- November 5, 1855
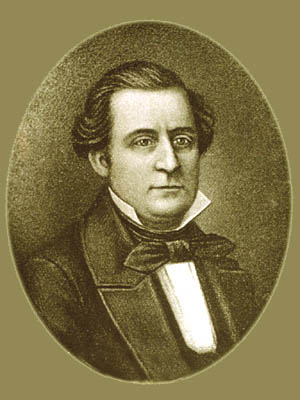

Nominee	Robert C. Wickliffe	Charles Derbigny
Party	Democratic	Know Nothing
Popular vote	23,592	19,755
Percentage	54.43%	45.57%
- Results; Wickliffe: 50–60% 60–70% 70–80% >90% Derbigny: 50–60% 60–70% 70–80%
Governor before election
Paul Octave Hébert
Democratic
Elected Governor
Robert C. Wickliffe
Democratic

The 1855 Louisiana gubernatorial election was the second election to take place under the Louisiana Constitution of 1852. As a result of this election Robert C. Wickliffe became Governor of Louisiana.

== Results ==
Popular Vote

Party	Candidate	Votes received	Percentage
Democratic	Robert C. Wickliffe	23,592	54.43%
Know Nothing	Charles Derbigny	19,755	45.57%
Total Vote		43,347	

Preceded by 1852 Louisiana gubernatorial election	Louisiana gubernatorial elections	Succeeded by 1859 Louisiana gubernatorial election
