= Mark W. Summers =

American historian

Mark Wahlgren Summers (born 1951) is an American historian who is a professor at the University of Kentucky. He has written books about political cartoons, the election of U.S. president Grover Cleveland in 1884, and the role of fear in American politics after the Civil War.

His father Clyde Summers was a law professor at Yale University.

He became fluent in French after spending part of his childhood in Wallonia.

== Writings ==
- A Student Cartoonist's View of Great Figures in American History (1972)
- The Presidency in Political Cartoons, 1776-1976 (1976)
- Railroads, Reconstruction and the Gospel of Prosperity (1984)
- The Plundering Generation: Corruption and the Crisis of the Union, 1848-1861 (1987)
- The Era of Good Stealings (1992)
- The Press Gang (1994)
- The Gilded Age (1997)
- Rum, Romanism, and Rebellion: The Making of a President, 1884 (2000)
- Party Games: Getting, Keeping, and Using Power in Gilded Age Politics (2004)
- A Dangerous Stir: Fear, Paranoia, and the Making of Reconstruction (2009)
- The Ordeal of the Reunion: A New History of Reconstruction (2014)
- To Save Us All from Slavery's Power: Republican Alarms, Southern Terrors, and the Plunge Into Civil War (2026)

== Articles ==
- "The Chimera of Whig Persistence: Louisiana and the Election of 1865" (1983)
- "A Band of Brigands: The 'Gridiron' Legislature and the Nomination of Lincoln" (1984)
- "The Press Gang" (1990)
