= Benjamin W. Pearce =

American politician

Benjamin Wiley Pearce (15 December 1816 – 8 October 1870) was an American politician. In 1864 and 1865 he served as Lieutenant Governor of the Confederate Louisiana.

== Life ==
Pearce was born in Greene County, Georgia. He attended public schools and studied for about two years at the University of Virginia. Due to health problems he terminated his course at that University. Instead he studied law in Tuscaloosa, Alabama. After his admission to the bar in 1840 he started a career as an attorney in Wetumpka, Alabama. Between 1844 and 1848 he lived in Ouachita County, Arkansas. During this time he started his political life as a member of the Democratic Party. He was elected to the Arkansas House of Representatives. However Pearce did not stay in that state. In 1848 he moved to Louisiana and then to Alabama. Since 1851 he permanently lived in Bienville Parish, Louisiana where he was also engaged in agricultural purposes. In addition he continued his political career. In the following years he became a member of the Louisiana House of Representatives and the Louisiana State Senate.

In 1860, Pearce was one of Louisiana's elected delegates at the Charleston Convention.

During the American Civil War Pearce supported the Confederate States. He organized Company C, Ninth Louisiana Infantry Volunteers and was appointed captain of the same. His unit served mainly in Virginia. However, due to bad health he could not remain in the military. Therefore, he returned to Louisiana, where he was elected to the office of the Lieutenant Governor for that part of the state that was still under the control of the Confederacy. He served in this position between 1864 and 1865 when the war ended. In this function he was the deputy of Confederate Governor Henry Watkins Allen and he presided over the (Confederate) State Senate. During the war he lost almost his entire fortune. He died on 8 October 1870 in the Bienville Parish, Louisiana.

Political offices
Preceded by Henry M. Hyams	Lieutenant Governor of Louisiana; 1864–1865	Succeeded by Albert Voorhies
