= Thomas Overton Moore =

American politician (1804–1876)

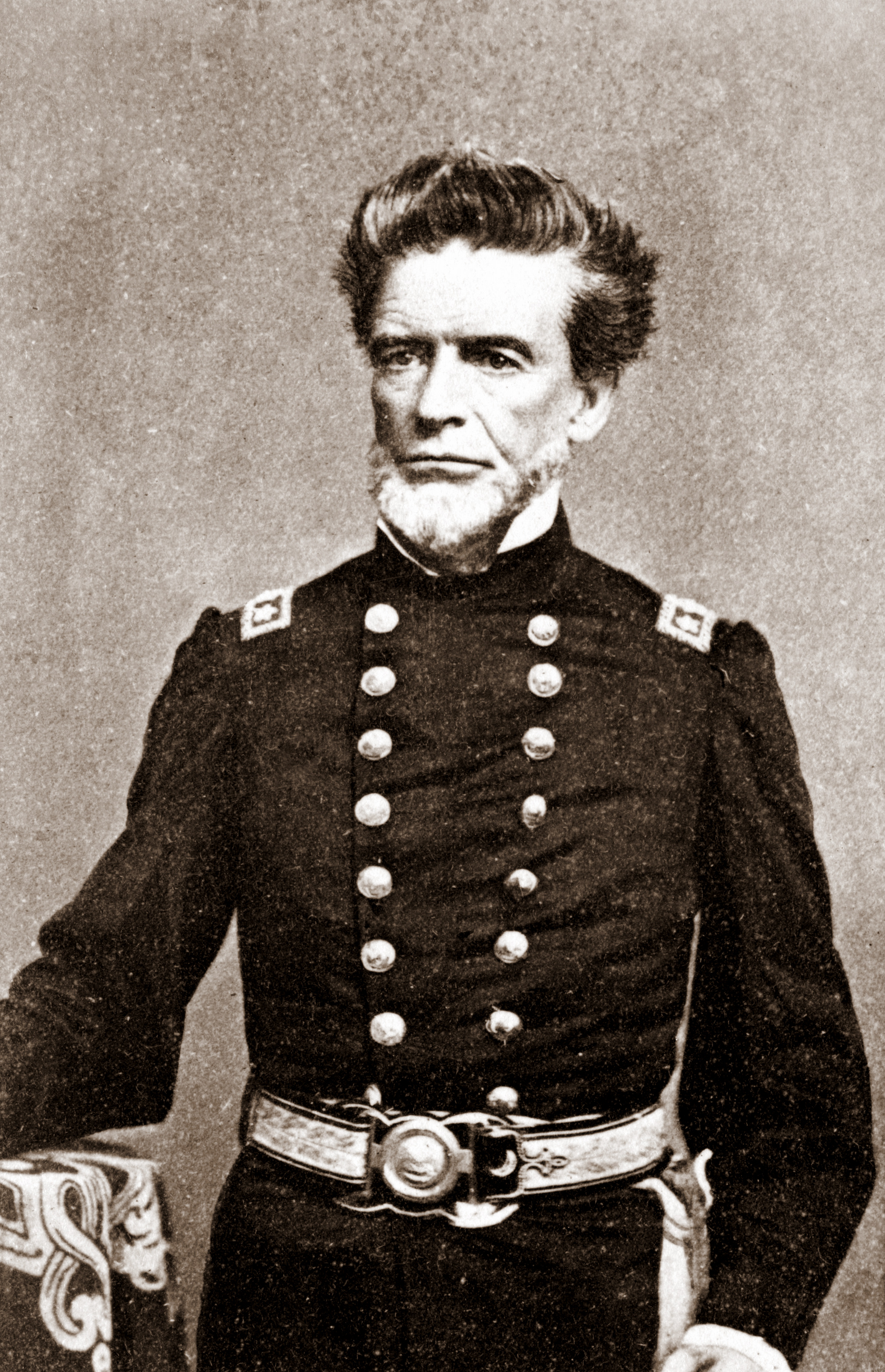

16th Governor of Louisiana
- In office January 23, 1860 – January 25, 1864
- Lieutenant: Henry M. Hyams
- Preceded by: Robert C. Wickliffe
- Succeeded by: Henry Watkins Allen

Personal details
- Born: April 10, 1804 Sampson County, North Carolina, US
- Died: June 25, 1876 (aged 72) Near Alexandria, Louisiana, US
- Party: Democratic
- Spouse: Bethiah Johnston Leonard
- Relations: Grove Stafford (great-grandson)
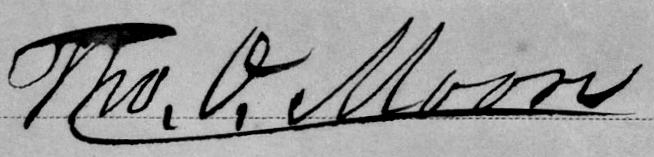
- Signature

Thomas Overton Moore (April 10, 1804 – June 25, 1876) was an attorney, slaveowner, and politician who was the 16th Governor of Louisiana from 1860 until 1864 during the American Civil War. Moore supported Louisiana's secession from the Union in January, 1861, but was largely powerless to stop Union forces from capturing large portions of the state during his term as governor.

== Early years ==
Moore was born in Sampson County, North Carolina, one of eleven children of James Moore and Jane Overton. The Moores were a Carolina planter family, and Jane Overton was the daughter of General Thomas Overton, a Tennessean and friend of Andrew Jackson. In 1829, Moore moved to Rapides Parish, Louisiana, to become a cotton planter. The next year, he married Bethiah Johnston Leonard, with whom he had five children.

Originally the manager of his uncle's plantation, he bought his own (Moreland), along with two others (Lodi and Emfield) worked by slave labor, and became highly prosperous. He was elected to the State House of Representatives in 1848 and the State Senate in 1851. In the Senate, Moore was chairman of the Education Committee and led the effort to establish the Louisiana State Seminary, now known as Louisiana State University and Agricultural and Mechanical College.

== Governor of Louisiana ==
Moore ran for governor as a Democrat in the November 1859 election, easily defeating opposition candidate Thomas Jefferson Wells. At the time Moore was elected, tensions were rising between Southern Democrats who advocated secession to preserve slavery, and Northern abolitionists who had created a new political force in the form of the Republican party. In his January 23, 1860 inaugural address, Moore shifted the blame for these tensions from the Southern advocates of secession to the Northern abolitionists:

So bitter is this hostility felt toward slavery, which these fifteen states regard as a great social and political blessing, that it exhibits itself in legislation for the avowed purpose of destroying the rights of slaveholders guaranteed by the Constitution and protected by the Acts of Congress. In the North, widespread sympathy for felons has deepened the distrust in the permanent federal government and awakened sentiments favorable to a separation of states.

After Republican Abraham Lincoln was announced as the winner of the 1860 presidential election, Moore called a special session of the Louisiana legislature on December 10. Stating that "I do not think it comports with the honor and respect of Louisiana to live under the government of a Black Republican President," Moore urged the legislature to authorize a secession convention. The convention met on January 23, 1861, and Louisiana voted to leave the Union on January 26.

Prior to secession being approved, Moore took action, ordering the state militia to seize federal arsenals and forts across the state. Moore placed Col. Braxton Bragg in command of the state military, and Louisiana joined the Confederate States of America on March 21, 1861, the sixth state to do so.

Despite the brisk recruiting of Confederate troops in Louisiana, the state rapidly came under threat after the Civil War broke out in April. New Orleans, the South's largest city and a crucial commercial port, was vulnerable to attack from ships sailing up the Mississippi River. Moore asked the Confederate government to send more forces to defend the city, but was told that Pensacola, Florida would be the priority of the attacking Union forces. United States Navy ships enforced a blockade of Southern ports which blocked the vital export of cotton from New Orleans. In early 1862, Union ships advanced towards the city, and after a prolonged bombardment, the Battle of Forts Jackson and St. Philip concluded with the destruction of the Confederate navy on the lower Mississippi and the passage of the forts by the Union fleet in the early morning of April 24, 1862. New Orleans surrendered on April 27. Two days earlier, Moore and the legislature had decided to abandon the state capital of Baton Rouge, also located along the river and vulnerable to attack, relocating to Opelousas on May 1, 1862.

Moore visited the state militia at the eponymous Camp Moore in Tangipahoa Parish and began organizing military resistance at the state level, ordering the burning of cotton and cessation of trade with the Union forces. Lacking support from the central government, Moore tried to procure as many arms as he could and organize the defense of his own state as Union forces advanced and the main Confederate armies were occupied elsewhere. In December Moore convened the legislature, and at his urging the state government passed bills to impress slaves to build fortifications, move the state capital to Shreveport, and require all free white males between ages 17 and 50 to enlist in the militia.

Meanwhile Union troops continued to advance across Louisiana, even raiding Moore's plantations. On July 4, 1863, Union forces led by General Ulysses S. Grant captured Vicksburg, Mississippi, and on July 9, Port Hudson, Louisiana also fell. With these two strategic points in Union hands, the northern forces now controlled the entire length of the Mississippi River, and the Confederacy was cut in two. Those Confederate states and military forces left on the west side of the river, such as the remnants of Moore's Louisiana government, would be left to fend for themselves for the remainder of the war.

== After the governorship ==
In January 1864, Moore's term as governor ended, and he was succeeded by Henry Watkins Allen. He returned to his plantation but was soon forced to flee to Texas when Union soldiers burned it in May. After the Civil War, he fled to Mexico to escape arrest, and subsequently to Havana. From Havana, Moore applied for a pardon. Moore's application for pardon was delivered by hand to Andrew Johnson by William Tecumseh Sherman. He eventually returned to Louisiana after being pardoned by Andrew Johnson on January 15, 1867. His lands were restored to him, in part through the influence of Sherman. He continued to be active in Democratic politics, and died in 1876 near Alexandria, Louisiana.

Moore's Civil War-era residence from 1862 through 1863 – the oldest Louisiana governor's mansion still in existence at the time – was destroyed by an intentionally set fire on July 14, 2016.

== See also ==
- CSS Governor Moore, a Confederate "cotton-clad" warship named after him.

Party political offices
Preceded by Robert C. Wickliffe	Democratic nominee for Governor of Louisiana; 1859	Succeeded by Henry Watkins Allen
Political offices
Preceded by Robert C. Wickliffe	Governor of Louisiana; 1860–1864	Succeeded by Henry Watkins Allen; George F. Shepley (D) Military Governor
