= Electoral Commission (United States) =

1877 US commission

The Florida Case before the Electoral Commission by Cornelia Adele Strong Fassett, 1879

The Electoral Commission, sometimes referred to as the Hayes-Tilden or Tilden-Hayes Electoral Commission, was a temporary body created by the United States Congress on January 29, 1877, to resolve the disputed presidential election of 1876. Democrat Samuel J. Tilden and Republican Rutherford B. Hayes were the main contenders in the election. Tilden won 184 undisputed electoral votes, one vote shy of the 185 needed to win, to Hayes' 165, with 20 electoral votes from four states (Florida, Louisiana, Oregon, and South Carolina) unresolved. Both Tilden and Hayes electors submitted votes from these states, and each claimed victory.

Facing an unparalleled constitutional crisis and intense public pressure, the Democratic-controlled House of Representatives and the Republican-controlled Senate agreed to the formation of the bipartisan Electoral Commission to settle the election. It consisted of fifteen members: five each from the House and the Senate, plus five Supreme Court justices. Eight members were Republicans; seven were Democrats. The commission ultimately voted along party lines to award all twenty disputed votes to Hayes, thus assuring his electoral victory by a margin of 185–184. Congress, meeting in a joint session on March 2, 1877, affirmed that decision, officially declaring Hayes the winner by one vote.

== Election of 1876 ==
1876 United States presidential election (excluding contested electors)

369 members of the Electoral College 185 electoral votes needed to win
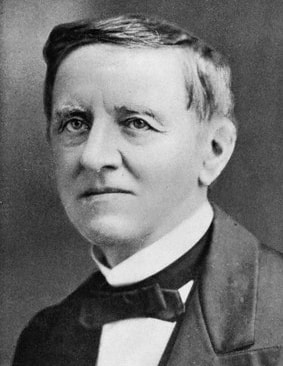

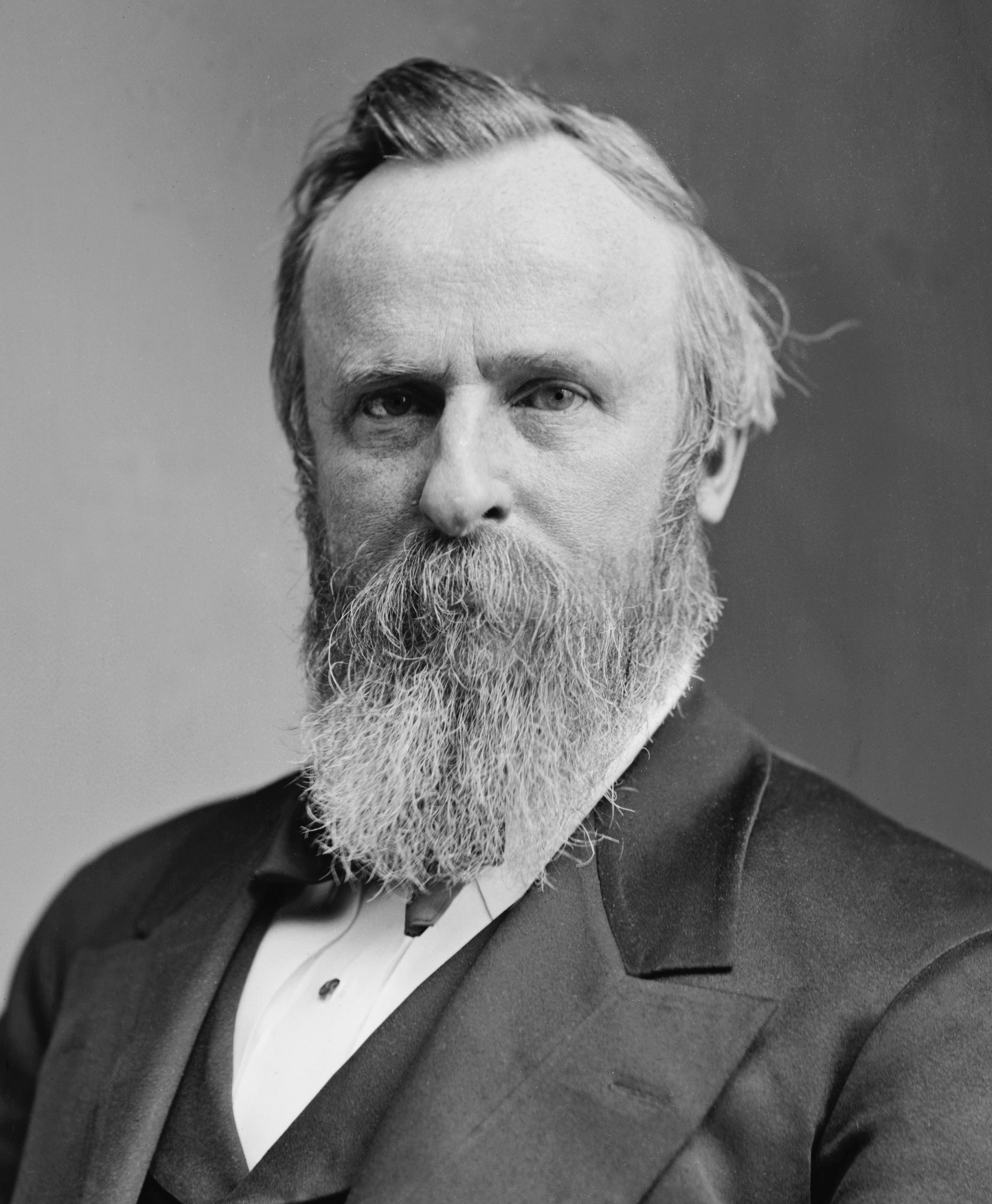
Nominee	Samuel J. Tilden	Rutherford B. Hayes
Party	Democratic	Republican
Home state	New York	Ohio
Running mate	Thomas A. Hendricks	William A. Wheeler
Electoral vote	184 (20 ev disputed)	165
States carried	17	18
- Presidential election results map. Red denotes states won by Hayes/Wheeler, blue denotes those won by Tilden/Hendricks. green denotes those in dispute at the Electoral Commission. Numbers indicate the number of electoral votes allotted to each state.
President before election
Ulysses S. Grant
Republican
Elected President
Rutherford B. Hayes
Republican

The presidential election was held on November 7, 1876, and Tilden won the electors of his home state of New York and most of the South, while Hayes' strength lay in New England, the Midwest, and the West. Tilden had won the popular vote by just over a quarter of a million votes, but he did not have a clear Electoral College majority. He received 184 uncontested electoral votes, while Hayes received 165. Both campaigns claimed the remaining twenty (four from Florida, eight from Louisiana, seven from South Carolina, and one from Oregon) votes. As 185 votes constituted a majority, Tilden needed only one of the disputed votes, while Hayes needed all twenty. The returns in several states, including the disputed states of Florida, Louisiana, and South Carolina, were tainted by allegations of electoral fraud, with each side claiming ballot boxes had been stuffed, ballots altered, and voters intimidated.

=== Florida, Louisiana, and South Carolina ===
Early returns suggested that Tilden had won the election, and on election night Republican Party chair Zachariah Chandler believed Hayes had lost. However, Chandler gave permission early the next morning to William E. Chandler and John C. Reid, managing editor of The New York Times (which had run the headline "The Results Still Uncertain" (Note: At the time, the New York Times was an explicitly Republican-aligned newspaper.)), to wire Republican officials in Florida, Louisiana, and South Carolina to hold their states for Hayes. In each state, Republicans controlled the partisan returning boards, tasked with certifying the popular results of the election. In response to Chandler's directive, Democratic Party chair Abram S. Hewitt organized committees of prominent Democrats to travel South and oversee the vote counting. President Grant, in turn, sent Republican delegations to follow the Democratic observers.

In each of the three disputed Southern states, the pattern that followed was largely the same: the returning board invalidated numerous ballots on the grounds of fraud or voter intimidation, delivering a popular majority to Hayes and the Republican candidate for Governor. A dissident Democratic government claimed victory and the legitimate authority to govern and certify the electoral vote of the state. The Republican claimant certified an electoral slate for Hayes, and the Democratic claimant certified a slate of electors for Tilden.

In Florida, the initial count showed Hayes ahead by 43 votes, but after corrections were made, Tilden took the lead by 94 votes. Subsequently, the returning board rejected numerous ballots, delivering the election to Hayes by nearly a thousand votes. The board also declared that the incumbent Republican governor, Marcellus Stearns, had won the gubernatorial election; however, the Florida Supreme Court overruled them, instead awarding the victory to Democrat George Franklin Drew, who announced that Tilden had carried Florida.

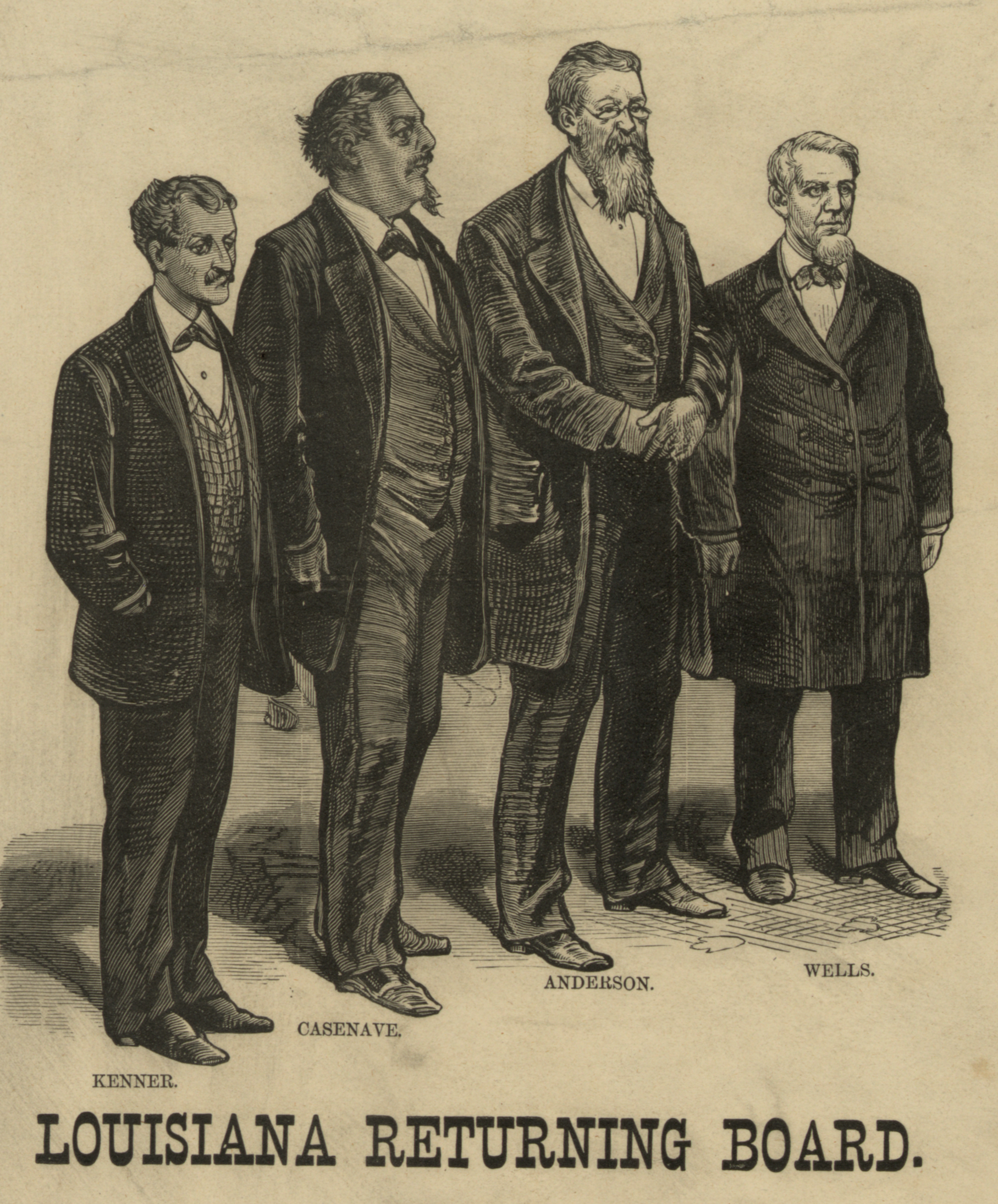
Louis M. Kenner, Casanave Gardenne, Thomas C. Anderson, James Madison Wells at the 1876 presidential fraud hearings.

In Louisiana, early unofficial tallies indicated that Tilden had carried the state by over 6,000 votes, but the Republican-controlled returning board rejected over 15,000 votes (13,000 for Tilden and 2,000 for Hayes) for reasons of fraud and voter intimidation. As a result, Hayes won Louisiana's eight electoral votes, while Republican candidate Stephen B. Packard was considered to lead the vote count in the simultaneous election for Governor of Louisiana. In response, the Democratic Party instituted a rival state government under Francis T. Nicholls, and this rival administration, in turn, certified that Tilden had won. The Louisiana Returning Board was composed of James Madison Wells, Thomas C. Anderson, Gardene Casanave, and Louis M. Kenner.

A nearly identical scenario played out in South Carolina, where initial returns suggested that Hayes had won the presidential election, while the Democratic candidate Wade Hampton III had won the gubernatorial contest. As in Louisiana, the Republican-controlled returning board rejected several thousand votes, ensuring the election of a Republican governor, Daniel Henry Chamberlain, and legislature. The Democratic Party promptly organized a rival state government, led by Hampton, and this body declared Tilden the victor in the presidential election.

=== Oregon elector ===
In addition to sending Democrats to observe the vote count in the South, Hewitt also responded to Chandler by directing Governor La Fayette Grover of Oregon to reject the election of a Republican elector. Though the popular vote in Oregon had clearly favored Hayes, the elector, John W. Watts, was a United States postmaster, calling into question his constitutional eligibility to serve. Article II, section 1, clause 2 of the Constitution reads "no … person holding an office of trust or profit under the United States shall be appointed an elector." Watts resigned his office a week after the election, long before the Electoral College was scheduled to meet. Thus, the question hinged on whether Watts was "appointed" at the time of his election in November or at the meeting of the electoral college in December.

Governor Grover certified a Tilden elector who had the next-most votes, C.A. Cronin, in his place. Thus, the Governor had certified two Republican electors and one Democratic elector. Historian C. Vann Woodward suggests this was done to provide a legal pretext to look behind the official state certification in the disputed states; if Republicans questioned Cronin's credentials as an elector (which they would have to do in order to win), they would be forced to permit questions against the apparently certified slates in Florida, Louisiana, and South Carolina.

=== Electoral College vote ===
On December 6, 1876, the electors met in the state capitals to cast their ballots. In Florida, Louisiana, and South Carolina, both the Democratic and the Republican slates of electors assembled, and cast conflicting votes, while in Oregon Watts and Cronin both cast ballots. Thus, from each of these four states, two sets of returns were transmitted to Washington, D.C.

== Constitutional crisis ==
The election dispute gave rise to a constitutional crisis, as no clear constitutional directive was given for recognizing or resolving disputed electoral counts. The Twelfth Amendment to the United States Constitution reads in part, "The President of the Senate shall, in the presence of the Senate and House of Representatives, open all the certificates and the votes shall then be counted;" but gives no explicit indication as to whom "the votes shall then be counted" by or where the authority rested to decide between competing slates of electors.

Some Hayes supporters argued that the President of the Senate had the authority to determine which certificates to count, because he was responsible under the Twelfth Amendment for presiding over the congressional session at which the electoral votes were tallied. Since the office was occupied by a Republican, this method would have favored Hayes. (Note: Under normal circumstances, the office of Senate President is occupied by the Vice President. See Vice President of the United States#President of the United States Senate. However, the office of Vice President had been vacant since the November 1875 death of Henry Wilson. Thus, president pro tempore Thomas W. Ferry of Michigan presided over the count.) Many Democrats argued that Congress, in joint session, should determine which certificates to count; because they controlled the much larger House, this would ensure Tilden's victory. Other Democrats posited that because neither candidate had a clear majority of the electoral vote, the election should be thrown to the House of Representatives, per the explicit terms of the Twelfth Amendment. Still others proposed that the matter should be settled by the Supreme Court.

As members of the political class returned to Washington D.C. in advance of the December congressional session, Democratic cries of "fraud" and "Tilden-or-fight" were met with Republican recriminations that Democratic victories in the South were attributable to fraud and intimidation. Democratic opinion was united in favor of Tilden, while some Republicans (including President Ulysses S. Grant and Senator Roscoe Conkling) privately expressed their belief that Tilden had won, and some Republican newspapers were ambivalent about Hayes's case. In a reversal of Civil War ideology, many Republicans argued that the right to certify electors lay solely with the states and could not be reviewed by Congress; Democrats argued that state returns were subject to federal scrutiny. However, the sole Democratic elector certified by the Governor of Oregon rendered the Republican argument for states' rights mostly moot, since pure deference to state returns would result in a vote of 185–184 in favor of Tilden.

In the background of the legal and political arguments lay the threat of armed violence, which did not clearly favor either side in the dispute. The United States was just over a decade removed from the American Civil War and sectional, racial, and ideological tensions had remained fraught during the Reconstruction Era. Republicans controlled the regular United States Army, but it was small and widely dispersed; Democratic governors throughout the country controlled their state chapters of the National Guard. Congressman Henry Watterson of Kentucky declared that an army of 100,000 men was prepared to march on Washington unless Tilden was declared President.

== Electoral Commission Act ==
Electoral Commission Act
- Long title: An Act to provide for and regulate the counting of votes for President and Vice-President, and the decisions of questions arising thereon, for the term commencing March fourth, anno Domini eighteen hundred and seventy-seven.
- Enacted by: the 44th United States Congress
- Effective: January 29, 1877

Citations
- Statutes at Large: 19 Stat. 227

Legislative history
- Introduced in the Senate as S. 1151 by Joint Select Committee on the Counting of the Electoral Votes on January 18, 1877; Passed the Senate on January 25, 1877 (47–17); Passed the House on January 26, 1877 (191–86); Signed into law by President Ulysses S. Grant on January 29, 1877

The 44th United States Congress met in a lame-duck session beginning December 7, the day after the disputed electoral votes were submitted. The House was controlled by the Democratic Party, while the Senate was controlled by the Republican Party. Based on the results of the 1876 election, party control promised to remain the same in each chamber for the 45th Congress.

On December 21 and 22, respectively, the Senate and House established special committees charged with establishing a process to resolve the dispute, with membership as follows:

Senate Special Committee			House Special Committee		
Member	State	Party	Member	State	Party
George Edmunds^{C}	Vermont	Republican	Henry Payne^{C}	Ohio	Democratic
Roscoe Conkling	New York	Republican	Abram Hewitt	New York	Democratic
Frederick Frelinghuysen	New Jersey	Republican	Eppa Hunton	Virginia	Democratic
Oliver Morton	Indiana	Republican	William Springer	Illinois	Democratic
Thomas Bayard	Delaware	Democratic	George Hoar	Massachusetts	Republican
Matt Whitaker Ransom	North Carolina	Democratic	George McCrary	Iowa	Republican
Allen Thurman	Ohio	Democratic	George Willard	Michigan	Republican

The two committees ultimately settled upon creating a commission that would count the electoral votes and resolve questions arising during the count. Many Republicans objected to the idea, insisting that the President pro tempore should resolve the disputes himself. Rutherford Hayes charged that the bill was unconstitutional. However, enough Republicans joined the Democrats to ensure its passage. On January 25, 1877, the Senate voted in favor of the bill 47–17; the House did likewise the next day, 191–86. The Electoral Commission Act (19 Stat. 227) was signed into law by President Ulysses S. Grant on January 29, 1877.

The Act provided that the Electoral Commission was to consist of fifteen members: five representatives selected by the House, five senators selected by the Senate, four Supreme Court justices named in the law, and a fifth Supreme Court justice selected by the other four. The most senior justice was to serve as president of the commission. Whenever two different electoral vote certificates arrived from any state, the commission was empowered to determine which return was correct. The commission's decisions could be overturned only by both houses of Congress.

== Membership of the commission ==
Originally, it was planned that the commission would consist of seven Democrats and seven Republicans, with an independent (Justice David Davis) as the fifteenth member of the commission. According to one historian, "no one, perhaps not even Davis himself, knew which presidential candidate he preferred." Just as the Electoral Commission Bill was passing Congress, the Legislature of Illinois elected Davis to the Senate, with Democrats in the Illinois legislature believing that they had purchased Davis' support for Tilden, but this was a miscalculation: Davis promptly excused himself from the commission and resigned as a Justice in order to take his Senate seat.

With no other independents on the Supreme Court, the final seat on the Electoral Commission was given instead to Justice Joseph P. Bradley, a Republican, giving the GOP a one-seat majority on the commission. In each case, Bradley would vote with his fellow Republicans to give the disputed electoral votes to Hayes.

The membership of the commission was as follows:

Member (State)	Body	Party
Josiah Gardner Abbott (Massachusetts)	House	Democratic
Thomas F. Bayard (Delaware)	Senate	Democratic
Joseph P. Bradley (New Jersey)	Supreme Court	Republican
Nathan Clifford^{PEC} (Maine)	Supreme Court	Democratic
George F. Edmunds (Vermont)	Senate	Republican
Stephen Johnson Field (California)	Supreme Court	Democratic
Frederick T. Frelinghuysen (New Jersey)	Senate	Republican
James A. Garfield (Ohio)	House	Republican
George Frisbie Hoar (Massachusetts)	House	Republican
Eppa Hunton (Virginia)	House	Democratic
Samuel Freeman Miller (Iowa)	Supreme Court	Republican
Oliver Hazard Perry Morton (Indiana)	Senate	Republican
Henry B. Payne (Ohio)	House	Democratic
William Strong (Pennsylvania)	Supreme Court	Republican
Allen G. Thurman (Ohio)	Senate	Democratic

== Proceedings of the commission and the Compromise of 1877 ==
The Electoral Commission held its meetings in the Supreme Court chamber. It sat in the same manner as a court, hearing arguments from both Democratic and Republican lawyers. Tilden was represented by Jeremiah S. Black, Montgomery Blair, John Archibald Campbell, Matthew H. Carpenter, Ashbel Green, George Hoadly, Richard T. Merrick, Charles O'Conor, Lyman Trumbull, and William C. Whitney. Hayes was represented by William M. Evarts, Stanley Matthews, Samuel Shellabarger, and E. W. Stoughton.

The tribunal began hearing arguments on February 1, 1877. Tilden's lawyers argued that the commission should investigate the actions of the state returning boards, and reverse those actions if necessary. Conversely, Hayes' counsel suggested that the commission should merely accept the official returns certified by the state governor without inquiring into their validity. To do otherwise, it was argued, would have violated the sovereignty of the states. The commission voted 8–7, along party lines, in favor of the Republican position.

Subsequently, in a series of party-line votes, the commission awarded all twenty disputed electoral votes to Hayes. Under the Electoral Commission Act, the commission's findings were final unless overruled by both houses of Congress. Although the Democrat-controlled House of Representatives repeatedly voted to reject the commission's decisions, the Republican-controlled Senate voted to uphold them. Thus, Hayes' victory was assured.

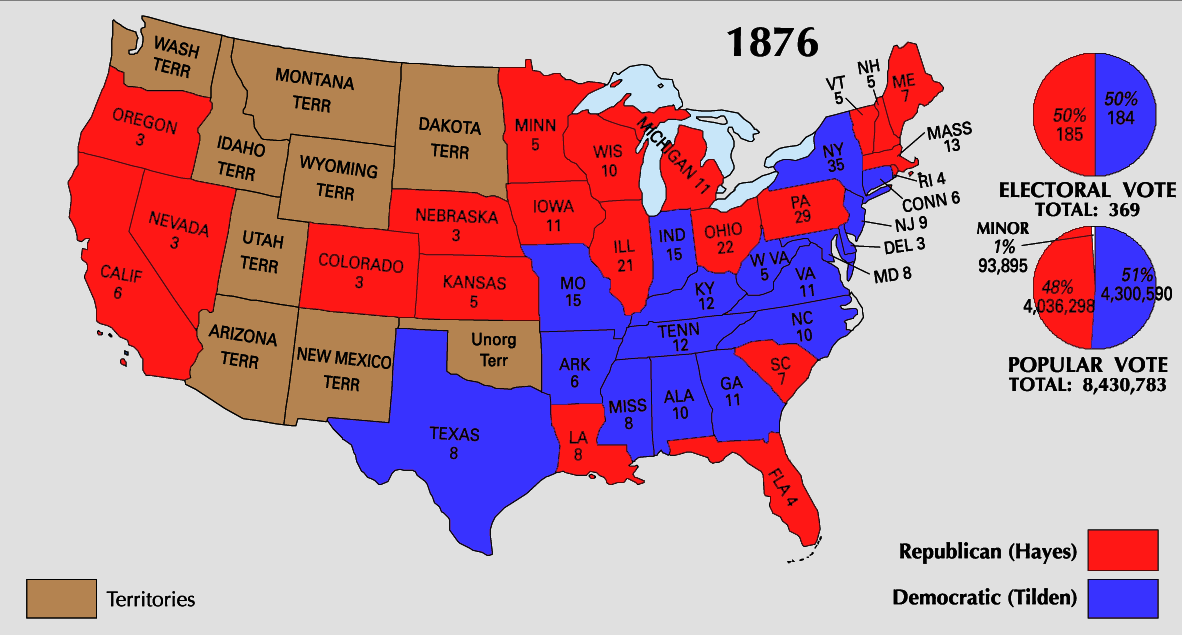
The final results of the presidential election of 1876 are shown above.

Unable to overturn the commission's decisions, many Democrats instead tried to obstruct them. Congressman Abram Hewitt, the chairman of the Democratic National Committee, made a spurious challenge to the electoral votes from Vermont, even though Hayes had clearly carried the state. The two houses then separated to consider the objection. The Senate quickly voted to overrule the objection, but the Democrats conducted a filibuster in the House of Representatives. In a stormy session that began on March 1, 1877, the House debated the objection for about twelve hours before overruling it. Immediately, another spurious objection was raised, this time to the electoral votes from Wisconsin. Again, the Senate voted to overrule the objection, while a filibuster was conducted in the House. However, the Speaker of the House, Democrat Samuel J. Randall, refused to entertain dilatory motions. Eventually, the filibusterers gave up, allowing the House to reject the objection in the early hours of March 2. The House and Senate then reassembled to complete the count of the electoral votes. At 4:10 am on March 2, Senator Ferry announced that Hayes and William A. Wheeler had been elected to the presidency and vice presidency, by an electoral margin of 185–184.

=== The Compromise of 1877 ===
Some historians believe that Democrats and Republicans reached an unwritten agreement (known as the Compromise of 1877) under which the filibuster would be dropped in return for a promise to end Reconstruction, but there is no contemporary evidence of it and little evidence at all. The name was coined by C. Vann Woodward in his 1951 book, Reunion and Reaction.

== Aftermath ==
Many of Tilden's supporters believed that he had been cheated out of victory, and Hayes was variously dubbed "Rutherfraud", "His Fraudulency", and "His Accidency." On March 3, the House of Representatives went so far as to pass a resolution declaring its opinion that Tilden had been "duly elected President of the United States." Nevertheless, Hayes was peacefully sworn in as president on March 5.

Many historians have complained that, after entering office, Hayes rewarded those who helped him win the election dispute with federal offices. Most notably, one of the lawyers who argued Hayes' case before the Electoral Commission, William M. Evarts, was appointed Secretary of State, while another, Stanley Matthews, was appointed to the Supreme Court, and a third, Edwin W. Stoughton, was appointed Minister to Russia.

In May 1878, the House of Representatives created a special committee charged with investigating the allegations of fraud in the 1876 election. The eleven-member committee was chaired by Clarkson Nott Potter, a Democratic congressman from New York. The committee, however, could not uncover any evidence of wrongdoing by the President. At approximately the same time, the New York Tribune published a series of coded telegrams that Democratic Party operatives had sent during the weeks following the 1876 election. These telegrams revealed attempts to bribe election officials in states with disputed results. Despite attempts to implicate him in the scandal, Samuel Tilden was declared innocent by the Potter Committee.

To prevent a repetition of the farce of 1876, the 49th Congress passed the Electoral Count Act in 1887. Under this law, now codified in 3 U.S.C. § 15, a state's determination of electoral disputes is conclusive in most circumstances: the President of the Senate opens the electoral certificates in the presence of both houses, and hands them to the tellers, two from each house, who are to read them aloud and record the votes. In the event of a state sending multiple returns to Congress, then whichever return has been certified by the executive of the state is counted, unless both houses of Congress decide otherwise.

=== The end of Reconstruction ===
One major outcome of the electoral commission and the Compromise of 1877 was the return of the South to "home rule" via the removal of federal troops, effectively ending the Reconstruction era.

With the end of federal government's enforcement of post-bellum equality, takeovers of the Southern legislatures by the Southern wing of the Democratic Party were quick to occur, often involving fraud and/or violence.

These new "Redeemer" governments implemented Jim Crow laws which imposed a system of racial discrimination, reversing the gains of Reconstruction and disenfranchising black people in the South until 1965.

== See also ==
- Bush v. Gore, a case relating to the disputed presidential election of 2000
- Attempts to overturn the 2020 United States presidential election
