= E. D. Estilette =

American politician (1833–1919)

Speaker of the Louisiana House of Representatives
- In office 1875–1876
- Preceded by: Michael Hahn
- Succeeded by: Michael Hahn

Personal details
- Born: December 19, 1833 Lake Arthur, Louisiana, US
- Died: November 7, 1919 (aged 85) Opelousas, Louisiana, US
- Spouse: Fannie Thompson Bacon Estilette
- Domestic partner: Victoria Gray
- Parent(s): Edmond Estilette and Marie Celeste Vasseur
- Occupation: lawyer, judge, speaker of the Louisiana House of Representatives

Edmond Ducre Estilette, known as E. D. Estilette (December 19, 1833 – November 7, 1919), was a politician and lawyer in Opelousas, Louisiana. He served in a number of public positions, most notably speaker of the Louisiana House of Representatives at the end of Reconstruction in 1875. Estilette oversaw the creation of one of the most infamous Black Codes of the post-Civil War era, but he was later seen as a moderating force in the turbulent politics of that era.

== Early life ==
Estilette was born in what is now Lake Arthur, Louisiana to a family of French origin who later moved to Opelousas. His parents were not wealthy, but his godfather was William Wikoff, one of the richest cattle ranchers in the United States at the time, and Wikoff's funds allowed Estilette to get an education. He attended St. Charles College in nearby Grand Coteau and then Yale University, where he studied law and was a member of the Class of 1857 and a member of Linonia. At Yale, he met and married a Connecticut woman, Fannie Thompson Bacon, a descendant of Jabez Bacon.

Upon his return to Opelousas, he ran a school for boys and for a time edited a newspaper published in French and English, The Opelousas Patriot or Le Patriote des Opelousas, while continuing to study the law. In 1860, he was admitted to the bar in St. Landry Parish.

== Civil War and local politics ==
Despite being 26 years old at the start of the Civil War, Estilette did not enlist in the Confederate States Army. Instead, he remained at his law practice and entered local politics. On June 9, 1862, he was elected to fill a vacancy on the Opelousas board of police, its equivalent of a city council, and by the end of the war was its president.

After the emancipation of slaves, in Louisiana and elsewhere, many local governments passed new Black Codes aimed at keeping newly freed African Americans in as close to a state of slavery as possible. Opelousas, under Estilette, achieved national notoriety for passing one of the most strict, including these provisions:

Section 1. Be it therefore ordained by the board of police of the town of Opelousas, That no negro or freedman shall be allowed to come within the limits of the town of Opelousas without special permission from his employers, specifying the object of his visit and the time necessary for the accomplishment of the same. Whoever shall violate this provision shall suffer imprisonment and two days' work on the public streets, or shall pay a fine of two dollars and fifty cents.

Section 2. Be it further ordained, That every negro freedman who shall be found on the streets of Opelousas after 10 o'clock at night without a written pass or permit from his employer shall be imprisoned and compelled to work five days on the public streets, or pay a fine of five dollars.

Section 3. No negro or freedman shall be permitted to rent or keep a house within the limits of the town under any circumstances, and any one thus offending shall be ejected and compelled to find an employer or leave the town within twenty-four hours. The lessor or furnisher of the house leased or kept as above shall pay a fine of ten dollars for each offence.

Section 4. No negro or freedman shall reside within the limits of the town of Opelousas who is not in the regular service of some white person or former owner, who shall be held responsible for the conduct of said freedman; but said employer or former owner may permit said freedman to hire his time by special permission in writing, which permission shall not extend over twenty-four hours at any one time. Any one violating the provisions of this section shall be imprisoned and forced to work for two days on the public streets. [...]

Ordained the 3d day of July, 1865.

E.D. ESTILLETTE,

President of the Board of Police.

Other provisions banned Blacks from holding public meetings, preaching to a church congregation, carrying firearms, selling goods, or being in the town after 3 p.m. on Sundays, though exceptions to some rules could be made with the permission of the mayor, an employer, or Estilette. To enforce the rules, on the same day, the board of police created a town patrol, made up of all white men between ages 17 and 50, that could be summoned by the mayor or Estilette "as he may deem necessary for the maintenance of order and the enforcement of the laws, regulations and ordinances of said Town."

Opelousas' Black Code became notorious in the North when it was included in Carl Schurz's report to President Andrew Johnson on conditions in the newly reconquered South. As the Chicago Tribune described it: "The negro is not only not permitted to be idle, but he is prohibited from working or carrying on a business for himself; he is compelled to be in the 'regular service' of a white man, and if he has no employer he is compelled to find one. It requires only a simple understanding among the employers and the negro is as bound to his 'employer' for better and for worse as when slavery existed in the old form." The Opelousas ordinance was copied by other towns and parishes in the state and elsewhere; 70 years later, W. E. B. Du Bois referred to it as "the celebrated ordinance of Opelousas, Louisiana."

== State politics ==
In 1865, he was appointed by Governor James Madison Wells as district attorney for St. Landry, Lafayette, Vermilion, and Calcasieu parishes, a position to which he was elected the next year and served until 1868.

In 1872 and 1874, he was elected as a Democrat to the Louisiana House of Representatives, where he was generally considered a moderating force, despite what the Opelousas Black Code might lead one to expect. Louisiana's elections in both years were riddled with fraud, but rival Republican and Democratic returning boards each declared Estilette winner of the seat. In 1874, when two rival legislatures were formed by supporters of Democrat John McEnery and Republican William Pitt Kellogg, Estilette first joined the McEnery "People's House" but then switched to the recognized Kellogg House, much to the chagrin of the Democratic press.

Still, Estilette was the rare Louisiana politician of the period who won praise from both sides of the aisle, as well as votes from both African Americans and whites. At the end of the first 1874 session of the legislature, the New Orleans Republican said he had "made a record which he can point to with pride...The General Assembly needs more men of his character and talent, no matter what their politics may be, and we hope his constituents will take this into consideration." A few days later, the Democratic The Times-Picayune wrote that, "without approving the course of those Fusion members of the Legislature who entered the Kellogg body," Estilette had introduced "bills having in view the general interests of the State and less objectionable in character...He has been earnest in the advocacy of what he believed to be right and in opposing what he deemed to be prejudicial to Louisiana. He has not participated in any of the corrupt business of the session, but acted conscientiously and sincerely."

== Opposition to the White League ==
A few weeks later, back in St. Landry Parish, white Democrats began to form the White League, a paramilitary terror group that overthrew several parish governments and, for several days, Louisiana's state government. Among their proposals was for white business owners to starve African Americans out of the area by eliminating all Black employment, even in the cotton fields: "The negroes must not only be excluded from clerkships in white stores, but they must not be allowed to trade there in any manner — to buy or sell. They must be driven from the cabins and decks of steamers, and from serving in hotels, and from all such employment generally. They must not be allowed to drive drays, wagons, carriages or carts...Above all let negroes be driven out of our fields and the whites driven in."

But Estilette resisted the White League's demands. Along with his former law partner John E. King and several prominent planters, he called for a public debate with White League leaders. Their opposition was based on economic, not racial grounds, arguing that the White League "would be in conflict with the public policy of the country, and prejudicial and detrimental to the agricultural interests of the parish of St. Landry." The debate was set for July 4, and Estilette was the first speaker. The local White League paper reported that Estilette had "made a Republican speech throughout, though claiming to be a Democrat." After the debate, the White League lowered their tone and claimed to be a friend to all.

The White League's growth continued through the summer and fall, reaching its peak on September 14, with the Battle of Liberty Place, in which 5,000 armed White League troops defeated a smaller force of state militia and New Orleans Metropolitan Police and overthrew Republican Governor William Pitt Kellogg, installing John McEnery in his place. But the victory was short-lived; President Ulysses S. Grant sent in federal troops to reinstall Kellogg, and the White League retreated after three days. That slowed its momentum, and when the St. Landry Democratic Party met to nominate candidates for the legislature on September 26, the White League was unable to stop Estilette from being renominated.

In November, he was reelected to the seat. Of the 15 Democrats who had switched from the McEnery "People's House" to the Kellogg legislature, Estilette was the only one to be reelected.

== Wheeler Compromise and speakership ==
Louisiana politics were still extremely volatile, with white Democrats using violence and intimidation to block the election and seating of Republican officials. When the new House of Representatives met on January 4, 1875, Republicans held a two-seat majority, but with the winners of five additional disputed seats to be voted on by the House itself. But at the start of the session, Democrat Louis A. Wiltz physically seized the speaker's chair and called for a voice vote to name him "temporary chairman" on the House, a position that did not exist. Based on the shouted votes of the members, Wiltz declared himself elected and quickly called for votes to seat Democrats in the five disputed seats, giving the party a "majority" of sorts. Democrats boycotted the organization of the state Senate, where they were not close to a majority.

Confusion reigned, with both parties claiming control of the House. A deal, called the Wheeler Compromise, was negotiated by Congressman William A. Wheeler, which in effect gave the disputed House seats to the Democrats in exchange for a promise not to impeach or otherwise try to remove Kellogg as governor. The Democratic House pledged that "henceforth we will accord to said Governor all necessary and legitimate support in maintaining the laws and in advancing the peace and prosperity of the people of this State."

When the House finally assembled to elect a speaker, the two leading candidates were Wiltz — who had opposed the Wheeler deal at every step and wanted keep up the attack on Kellogg — and Estilette, who had the support of more moderate Democrats, as well as the chamber's Republicans. Before the vote, the pro-Wiltz and pro-White League New Orleans Bulletin reported Wiltz had a lead of roughly 20 votes. But the House gave Estilette an easy victory, outvoting Wiltz 66 to 37.

As speaker, Estilette went back on one key commitment of the Wheeler Compromise. On February 28, 1876, Estilette allowed the Democratic House to vote on impeachment charges against Kellogg. The charges were comical — Democrats did not even bother to list any specific accusations, instead voting on a resolution declaring Kellogg's general impeachment-worthiness, in their view — but they did pass the House under Estilette's leadership. The Senate convened on the same day to preemptively reject any possible charges, rendering the issue moot.

== Later life ==
Estilette was discussed as a potential candidate for governor in 1876, but Democrats instead chose Francis T. Nicholls, another relative moderate within the party, over Wiltz and McEnery. Estilette did not seek renomination for his state House seat, opting instead to pursue a seat in Congress. But the split among St. Landry Democrats meant he didn't win the nomination, leaving him out of public office after two years as House speaker.

Thanks to a new wave of violence on the part of white Democrats and the Compromise of 1877, Nicholls became governor, becoming the first Democrat in the office since the Civil War and ending Reconstruction in Louisiana. But a new state constitution cut Nicholls' term short and he was succeeded by the more extreme Wiltz. When Nicholls ran again in 1884, it was Estilette who put his name in nomination.

Estilette lived another 42 years after leaving the legislature. In 1887, he was later appointed judge of the 13th Judicial District, which included St. Landry and the newly formed Acadia Parish, and he continued his legal career in Opelousas.

== Family ==
Only one of his children with Fannie Bacon survived to adulthood, daughter Julia Bacon Estilette. She married Gilbert Louis Dupré, the great-grandson of Louisiana Governor Jacques Dupré and son of Lucius Jacques Dupré, who represented Louisiana in the Confederate Congress. Dupré would later hold his father-in-law's former House seat, as would Dupré's own son-in-law, Felix Octave Pavy. Dupré would be known for his political opposition to Huey Long; Pavy's nephew by marriage, Carl Weiss, assassinated Long in 1935.

Estilette's wife Fannie died in 1897. Soon after Estilette started a new family, with a mulatto woman named Victoria Gray, with whom he had five children over the next 11 years. One of his daughters with Gray, Louise Estilette Perrodin, became a prominent leader in the Church of God in Christ in California. He died in 1919.
