= Ulgar Dupart =

Louisiana politician

Ulgar Dupart was a delegate at Louisiana's 1868 constitutional convention for Terrebonne Parish and a state legislator. He served in the Louisiana House of Representatives from 1868 to 1870. He advocated for equal rights. He was a Republican. He represented the Parish alongside Frederick Marie, an immigrant from France.

== See also ==
- African American officeholders from the end of the Civil War until before 1900
