= Fassett =

Fassett may refer to:

== People ==
- Cornelia Adele Strong Fassett (1831–1898), American painter
- Francis H. Fassett (1823–1908), American architect
- Jacob Sloat Fassett (1853–1924), American politician and businessman
- Kaffe Fassett (born 1937), American textile artist
- Norman Carter Fassett (1900–1954), botanist with author abbreviation Fassett

== Places ==
- Fassett, Pennsylvania, United States
- Fassett, Quebec, Canada
- Fassett Square, in Dalston, London Borough of Hackney, England
