= 1879 Louisiana gubernatorial election =

- December 2, 1879
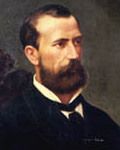

Nominee	Louis A. Wiltz	Taylor Beattie
Party	Democratic	Republican
Popular vote	74,769	40,764
Percentage	64.72%	35.28%
- Parish Results; Wiltz: 50–60% 60–70% 70–80% 80–90% 90–100% Beattie: 50–60% 60–70% 70–80% 80–90% 90–100% No Data/Vote
Governor before election
Francis T. Nicholls
Democratic
Elected Governor
Louis A. Wiltz
Democratic

The 1879 Louisiana gubernatorial election was the first election to take place under the Louisiana Constitution of 1879. As a result of this election Louis A. Wiltz became Governor of Louisiana. The election saw widespread intimidation of African Americans which guaranteed the election of the Democratic nominee.

== Results ==
Popular Vote

Party	Candidate	Votes received	Percentage
Democratic	Louis A. Wiltz	74,769	64.72%
Republican	Taylor Beattie	40,764	35.28%
Total Vote		115,533	

Preceded by 1876 Louisiana gubernatorial election	Louisiana gubernatorial elections	Succeeded by 1884 Louisiana gubernatorial election
