= Charles J. Leeds =

American mayor

Charles J. Leeds was the 37th mayor of New Orleans (November 30, 1874 – December 19, 1876).

Leeds was a member of the white supremacist organization White League and had furnished its members with artillery and small arms during their insurrection against the elected government in the so-called Battle of Liberty Place in 1874.

== Citations ==
Political offices
Preceded by Louis A. Wiltz	Mayor of New Orleans; November 30, 1874 – December 19, 1876	Succeeded by Edward Pilsbury
