= Taylor Beattie =

Confederate States Army officer, politician, and judge

Taylor Beattie (July 4, 1837 – November 19, 1920) was a Confederate States Army officer, politician, and judge from Louisiana. A conservative Republican, he joined the party's Lily-White faction. He was a leader of the militia that carried out the Thibodaux massacre. He declared martial law and organized white supremacist strike breakers. United States District Judge Charlton Reid Beattie was his son.

== Early life, education, and career ==
Beattie was a native of Lafourche Parish. His parents, John C. and C. (Reid) Beattie, were both natives of the Blue Grass regions of Kentucky. His father was an attorney and a plantation owner who served as district attorney in Lafourche Parish and was a member of the Louisiana Constitutional Convention of 1844. The paternal ancestors were originally from Scotland and settled in this country as early as 1690. The maternal ancestors were originally from Ireland and immigrated to this country in 1680". Beattie received his collegiate education at the University of Virginia, and subsequently returned to his native parish, where be began the study of law, being admitted to the bar in 1859.

== Military service and legal career ==
Beattie was described as "one of the popular men of the state". He espoused the cause of the Confederacy and was described as "an able and fearless defender of Southern rights". He joined the 1st Louisiana Infantry (Regulars) as second lieutenant, was mustered into service in April 1861, and served as lieutenant until at Pensacola, Florida, when he was promoted to the rank of captain. In 1863 he was made colonel and afterward served on court martial duty until the cessation of hostilities. He was in all the campaigns of the western army and was with General Johnston at the time of his surrender.

Returning to Lafourche Parish he resumed the practice of law, frequently employed in important suits involving large amounts and presenting intricate questions of law. He was also engaged in planting after 1869 and made about 1,000 hogsheads of sugar each year. In 1871 he was appointed judge of the Fifteenth district, and in 1872 he was elected and re-elected in 1876 and served until 1880. He was the Republican candidate for governor in 1879 and was a candidate for congress in 1882. In 1884 he was elected judge of the Twentieth judicial district and re-elected in 1888. While serving in this office in November 1887, he was a leader of the Thibodaux massacre, in which dozens of black sugarcane workers were slaughtered by a white militia during a labor strike.

== Personal life and death ==
Beattie married in 1868 to Miss F. Pugh, of an old and prominent family, and they had two sons and two daughters.

He owned several plantations, but his residence and office were situated across the La Fourche bayou and in a forest of oak trees. He retired from the practice of law around 1918, and died two years later at his home in Thibodaux, Louisiana, at the age of 83, following a two-week illness.

== See also ==
- 1879 Louisiana gubernatorial election

Party political offices
Preceded by Stephen B. Packard	Republican nominee for Governor of Louisiana; 1879	Succeeded by John Stevenson
