= Thibodaux massacre =

Event of racial violence in the late 19th Century Southern United States

Thibodaux Massacre
- Part of the nadir of American race relations
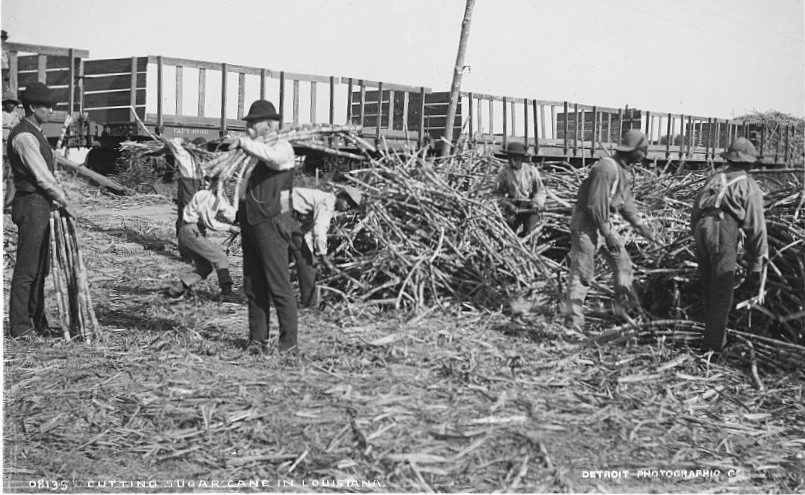
- Louisiana sugar cane laborers c. 1880
- Location: Thibodaux, Louisiana
- Date: November 22–25, 1887
- Target: Sugar Cane Workers (90% black)
- Deaths: 35–50 (all black)
- Injuries: unknown (possibly hundreds)
- Perpetrators: White paramilitaries and State Militia

The Thibodaux Massacre was an episode of white supremacist violence that occurred in Thibodaux, Louisiana, on November 23, 1887. It followed a three-week strike during the critical harvest season in which an estimated 10,000 workers protested against the living and working conditions which existed on sugarcane plantations in four parishes: Lafourche, Terrebonne, St. Mary, and Assumption.

The strike was the largest strike in the history of the industry, and it was the first strike to be conducted and coordinated by a formal labor organization, the Knights of Labor. At planters' requests, the state sent the militia to protect strikebreakers from ambush attacks by strikers, and work resumed on some plantations. Black workers and their families were evicted from plantations in Lafourche and Terrebonne parishes and retreated to Thibodaux.

Tensions erupted into violence on November 21 when an unknown white man entered a black-owned barroom and killed one black laborer and wounded another. Violence continued on November 23 when five town guards were ambushed and two wounded, and local white paramilitary forces responded by attacking black workers and their families. Although the number of casualties is unknown, the consensus is that at least 35 black people were killed during the next three days (some historians estimate that 50 black people were killed) and the total tally of killed, wounded, and missing was rumored to number in the hundreds, which makes it one of the most violent labor disputes in U.S. history. According to one account, the victims included elders, women, and children. All of the people who were killed were African American.

The massacre and the passage of discriminatory state legislation by white Democrats, including the disenfranchisement of most blacks, ended the organizing of sugar workers for decades until the 1940s. According to historian John C. Rodrigue, "The defeated sugar workers returned to the plantations on their employers' terms."

== Background ==
=== Conditions of sugar laborers ===
The harvesting and processing of sugarcane comprised several steps which needed to be closely coordinated by a large labor force which was pushed to work to the point of physical exhaustion. Sugar plantations were called "factories in the field," and their workers died at a high rate during the era of slavery. Conditions were little improved after Reconstruction.

A major issue arose in the early 1880s when plantation owners began cutting wages and forcing sugar workers to accept scrip for pay due to a declining international sugar market. These "pasteboard tickets" were redeemable only at company stores, which operated at high profit margins. As the plantation kept the books, often illiterate workers were increasingly bound by debt and unable to get free. Required by law to pay off the debt, workers became essentially bound to the plantation in a state similar to slavery. Most of the sugarcane workers were black, but there were also whites. The Knights of Labor used the scrip issue to organize workers, and thousands joined the group.

In October 1877 Duncan F. Kenner, a millionaire planter, founded the statewide Louisiana Sugar Producers Association (LSPA), consisting of 200 of the largest planters in the state, and served as president. The powerful LSPA lobbied the federal government for sugar tariffs, funding to support levees to protect their lands, and research to increase crop yields. For the next decade these members also worked to gain control over their labor. They adopted a uniform pay scale and withheld 80 percent of the wages until the end of the harvest season, in order to keep workers on the plantations through the end of the season.

=== Labor struggles ===
The workers resisted, mounting some actions each year contesting some part of the LSPA's program. The state government supported the planters, sending in state militia when the planters used convict lease labor from prisons to harvest and process the cane.

In 1887 the Knights of Labor organized a major three-week sugar strike against cane plantations in Lafourche, Terrebonne, St. Mary, and Assumption parishes. Most plantations were idle. The strike was organized by the national Knights of Labor organization, who had established Local Assembly 8404 in Schriever the preceding year.

In October labor representatives delivered demands to the LSPA that included an increase in wages to $1.25 per day, biweekly payments, and payment in currency instead of scrip.

As the LSPA ignored the demands, the Knights of Labor called the strike for November 1, timed to coincide with the critical "rolling period" of the crop, when it had to be harvested and processed. The work stoppage threatened the entire sugarcane harvest for the year. The 1887 strike was the largest labor action in the industry, involving an estimated 10,000 workers, a tenth of whom were white. It was the first time a formal labor organization had led a strike in this region.

=== Strike suppression ===
The planters appealed to Louisiana Governor Samuel D. McEnery, who was also a planter. McEnery, declaring, "God Almighty has himself drawn the color line," called out 10 infantry companies and an artillery company of the state militia, sending the latter to Thibodaux, the parish seat and "heart of the strike." They were to protect strikebreakers and suppress strikers; they evicted workers from plantation housing. The militia suppressed strikers in St. Mary Parish, resulting in as many as 20 people killed or wounded on November 5 in the black village of Pattersonville.

The militia protected some 800 contract workers brought in to Terrebonne Parish and helped capture and arrest 50 strikers, most for union activities. The strike collapsed there, and workers returned to the plantations.

Many of the black workers in Lafourche Parish retreated after eviction to the crowded black residential section of Thibodaux, and the state militia withdrew. They left it up to local officials to manage from there.

== Prelude ==
Newspapers reported that on November 1, the same day the Knights of Labor called the strike, strikers concealed in a cane field fired upon white replacement workers at the Lacassagne plantation in Tigerville (present-day Gibson), wounding four workers. Over the next three weeks, strikers allegedly used threats and gunshots from ambush to intimidate replacement workers. Several were wounded in attacks upon sugar houses, one losing an eye and one reportedly dying from his wounds. According to newspaper accounts, around November 13, Theodule Baille, a sugar boiler riding on the bayou levee, was fired upon about a mile below Thibodaux. Shots were also reportedly fired at white workers on two plantations near Thibodaux.

A New Orleans newspaper reported "for three weeks past the negro women of the town have been making threats to the effect that if the white men resorted to arms they would burn the town and [end] the lives of the white women and children with their cane knives." Similarly, it was reported "[s]ome of the colored women made open threats against the people and the community, declaring that they would destroy any house in the town...[n]ot a few of the negroes boasted that in case a fight was made they were fully prepared for it." One historian adds:

As late as November 21 some still comported themselves with confidence, and perhaps bravado, on the sidewalks. Mary Pugh, widow of Richard Pugh, owner of Live Oak Plantation in Lafourche Parish, reported "meeting negro men singly or two or three together with guns on their shoulders going down town & negro women on each side telling them to 'fight - yes - fight we'll be there.'"

After the event, a Thibodaux newspaper repeated the claim that prior to November 23, "[t]he negroes were in motion [and] [t]heir women boasted that they were ready to fire the town." The white editor of the Lafourche Star newspaper (who participated in the killings) also offered this attempt at justification for the severity of the vigilante committee's response:

The loud-mouthed "wenches" must bear in mind that though they have a tongue, they are not priviledged to make use of such threats as "burning the town," ["]slaughtering the whites from the cradle to the grave," etc.

== Attacks ==
Parish District Judge Taylor Beattie, who owned Orange Grove Plantation and was a member of the LPSA, announced the formation of a "Peace and Order Committee" in Thibodaux. He declared martial law and recruited 300 white men for his committee to serve as a paramilitary group. He ordered blacks within the city limits to show passes to enter or leave. Like many top-ranking white state officials, Beattie was an ex-Confederate and former slaveholder. He was a former member of the Knights of the White Camelia, a group that had worked to suppress and intimidate black voters during Reconstruction.

On November 21 two black men were shot—a man named Watson died, and a second man, Morris Page, was wounded. Beattie ordered the paramilitary to close the entrances to the city on the morning of November 22 and stand guard. Someone fired from ambush on two of the pickets, John G. Gorman and Henry Molaison, seriously wounding both. An eyewitness, another guard, describes the initial attack on Gorman:

We were fired upon while seated at a camp fire except [for] Mr. Gorman[,] [who] was standing at [it]. This firing came from ambush in a corn field opposite. When the shot was fired Gorman threw up his right hand to his forehead, said ["B]oys, I am severely wounded. I am bleeding from the eyes and mouth.["] I then helped Mr. Gorman to home [and] had been gone but a short distance when I heard the second shot fired which I think came from ambush. This was followed by 5 or 6 shots which sounded like shots from a rifle. The 1st shot fired which hit Mr. Gorman sounded as a shot from a shot gun.

Molaison was shot shortly after Gorman. According to another eyewitness, a white resident of the neighborhood:

[A]bout 5 o’clock I heard a shot fired. A moment after I heard two more fired one after the other. The moment I heard the two last shots I heard the guard cry out, that he was shot. I got out of my bed immediately[.] [T]hey ordered me out of my house to advance. I cried out ["]I am a friend advancing to assist.["] The guard Henry Molaison understood my voice, he said ["P]rotect me if you can.["] I said ["]I will[.] [The guard said] ["L]ook in the ditch[,] you will find my rifle close by me.["] I was handed a pistol and a rifle then at the same time. I reach to pick Mr. Molaison up[.] [H]e said ["D]on't pull me[;] you hurt my leg.["] . . . I then took Mr. Molaison on my back into my house which is forty feet from the railroad. The guard was stationed on the right hand side of my fence. The shot that struck the fence was a heavily loaded gun. [From] the sound of the gun the sound was that of a shot gun. I am a [sic] old hunter and consider myself an expert and can distinguish the sound of a gun. . . . In my portion of the town the negroes seemed bo[a]stful and threatening before the shooting of the guards.

After the two white pickets were shot and wounded, a local volunteer company, the Clay Knobloch Guards, went to the scene and claimed to also have been fired upon from ambush. They reportedly returned fire and fatally shot six blacks and wounded four others, and captured several loaded shotguns. The company and other white vigilantes started to round up and kill black workers and family members. They targeted known and suspected Knights of Labor organizers. The victims were killed in town and where they tried to hide in the surroundings woods and swamps. Some bodies were reportedly left in shallow graves or the swamps. On November 26 the bodies of three blacks were found in a thicket on the Allen Rienzi plantation. It was believed they had been wounded and had taken refuge where they were later found dead.

A New Orleans black newspaper, The Daily Pelican, describes the scene:

'Six killed and five wounded' is what the daily papers here say, but from an eye witness to the whole transaction we learn that no less than thirty-five "...fully thirty negroes have sacrificed their lives in the riot on Wednesday..." Negroes were killed outright. Lame men and blind women shot; children and hoary-headed grandsires ruthlessly swept down! The Negroes offered no resistance; they could not, as the killing was unexpected. Those of them not killed took to the woods, a majority of them finding refuge in this city.

No other contemporary source, however, includes reference to children being killed. In the same account, the newspaper claims that the two pickets were shot by other white guards from Shreveport, to create a pretext to initiate the wholesale slaughter of the black strikers. But the Shreveport state militia company reportedly left Thibodaux two days earlier. Henry Franklin, the owner of the nearby coffee house and bar where the two black men were shot on November 21, plainly stated on November 24 that the shooting of the two pickets was perpetrated by "colored people who were out on the strike." Based on hearsay estimates, he stated that the number of dead amounted to 25.

The Daily Pelican account is apparently one source for the casualty figure of 35. According to historian Rebecca Jarvis Scott, "No credible official count of the victims of the Thibodaux massacre was ever made; bodies continued to turn up in shallow graves outside of town for weeks to come." Eric Arnesen writes that local white residents privately admitted more than 50 workers were murdered in Thibodaux, but the total was uncertain. Along the Bayou Lafourche, black oral history has reportedly told of hundreds of casualties, including wounded and missing. However, no documentation of such memories or folklore, such as witness statements or oral interview transcripts, has been cited.

Modern author James Keith Hogue attributes 50 deaths to the three-day attacks by the paramilitary, saying that in addition, numerous Knights of Labor organizers disappeared over the next year. But he cites no authority as reference for the figure of 50. He also makes the unsupported claim (discredited by all contemporary accounts, including those cited herein) that "the Thibodaux paramilitaries launched a preemptive dawn attack on November 23."

== Aftermath ==
The known victims of the fatal violence of November 23, 1887 were Willis Wilson, Felix Pierre, Archy Jones, Frank Patterson, Grant Conrad, Marcellin Weldon, Riley Anderson, and Mahala Washington. John G. Gorman, the first picket shot by the strikers, lost an eye from the lead slug that struck him on the side of the head and exited his mouth through the palate, shattering the bones along its path. The other picket, Henry Molaison, was unable to walk without assistance a month after his wounding. The severity of their injuries was attributed to the fact that the lead slugs that struck them were roughly "chopped from a bar of lead," and thereby presumably intended to cause massive injuries on impact.

After the massacre, labor organizing among sugar workers essentially was suspended, with plantation workers returning to work under the owners' terms. White Democrats, who dominated the state legislature, soon passed laws for disenfranchisement of blacks, racial segregation and other Jim Crow rules. There was no more effort to organize sugar workers until the 1940s. It was then initiated in the context of increased civil rights activism after World War II.

In that same period, beginning during the war, many Louisiana blacks joined the Great Migration to the North and West Coast to escape the continuing violence and racial oppression. It was not until the mid-1960s that the civil rights movement achieved the passage of Congressional legislation to enforce civil and voting rights for African Americans and other minorities in the United States.

In May 2017, descendants of both the African-American workers and Louisiana plantation owners commemorated those killed. The Louisiana 1887 Memorial Committee, in partnership with the University of Louisiana Lafayette Public Archeology Lab, is attempting to verify a mass gravesite on private property, with plans for examination and proper burial in volunteered churchyards of any victims found. In May 2017, the Thibodaux City Council officially condemned the violence and acknowledged that the event occurred. The Lafourche Parish Council did likewise in November 2017.

== Representation in media ==
- The Thibodaux Massacre: Racial Violence and the 1887 Sugar Cane Labor Strike (2016) by John DeSantis details the events. It provides eyewitness accounts obtained from documents in the U.S. National Archives and names eight of the victims. It also provides a detailed history of U.S. Civil War veteran Jack Conrad who was wounded during the incident and whose records provide new information and insight. (It does not include the details relating to the precipitating attack upon the pickets Gorman and Molaison, although a brief mention is made of the existence of the public records of the coroner's inquest in which those details were documented.)
- The film The Man Who Came Back (2008), directed by Glenn Pitre, presents a very loose adaptation of the events, putting a Western genre plot on the sugar strike and massacre. The film was not released in theaters but played at the New Orleans Film Festival.

== See also ==
- List of massacres in the United States
- List of worker deaths in United States labor disputes
