= Frederick Marie =

19thC Louisiana legislator

Frederick Marie was a sugar grower, sheriff, and state legislator in Louisiana. He lived in Terrebonne Parish. He served as sheriff from 1868 to 1870 and in the Louisiana House of Representatives from 1872 to April 15, 1875 when he was unseated by the Wheeler Compromise. He was one of five African American representatives who lost their seats after a year.
