= Gilbert Dupré =

American lawyer and politician

Gilbert Louis Dupré Sr.

Louisiana State Representative for St. Landry Parish
- In office 1888–1890
- In office 1913–1932
- Preceded by: A. H. Garland

District Judge for St. Landry Parish
- In office 1896–1912

Personal details
- Born: September 20, 1858 St. Landry Parish; Louisiana, USA
- Died: December 18, 1946 (aged 88)
- Resting place: Myrtle Grove Cemetery in Opelousas, Louisiana
- Party: Democratic
- Spouse: Julia Estillette Dupré (married 1881-1944, her death)
- Children: Marie Lucile Dupré Gilbert L. Dupré Jr. Fannie Estilette Dupré Pavy Ethel May Dupré Litten
- Parent(s): Lucius J. and Caroline Vanhille Dupré
- Education: Home schooling Private study of law in office of St. Landry Parish district clerk
- Profession: Lawyer

Military service
- Branch/service: Louisiana State Militia

Gilbert Louis Dupré Sr. (September 20, 1858 – December 18, 1946), was a self-educated lawyer and state representative from Opelousas, Louisiana, known for his initial political opposition to Governor Huey Pierce Long Jr. He held his state House seat from 1913 to 1932. A native of St. Landry Parish in South Louisiana, he maintained his legal office for many years in Opelousas.

In his last year in office, Dupré, by then an elderly deaf man, spoke out against the Long intra-party challenger, Dudley LeBlanc of Abbeville through the Long newspaper, the Louisiana Progress.

== Biography ==
Dupré was born into an established French-American family, the son of Lucius Jacques Dupré (1822–1869) and the former Caroline Victoire Vanhille (1826–1896). His great-grandfather, Jacques Dupré, was a pioneer of St. Landry Parish who served as a National Republican governor of Louisiana from 1830 to 1831 and in the Louisiana State Senate during the 1830s and 1840s. Gilbert was only ten when his father, Lucius, who was a law graduate of the University of Virginia and a member of the former Confederate Congress, died.

The emancipation of slaves reduced the Duprés' wealth from extraordinary to merely well above the local average. In the 1860 census, the family's wealth is listed at $70,000 (equivalent to US$2,508,333 in 2025); in 1870, that number had dropped to $5,500 (equivalent to US$140,033 in 2025).

As was common at the time, Dupré read law outside of a university setting, working first in the office of the St. Landry Parish clerk of court. He was admitted to the bar in 1880 and established his law office in Opelousas. In 1887, Dupré was a member of the Louisiana state militia and was on active duty at the time of a riot in Morgan City in St. Mary Parish. He was a member of the Masonic lodge, the Benevolent and Protective Order of Elks, and the Roman Catholic Church.

From 1888 to 1992 and again from 1913, to fill the seat vacated by A. H. Garland, who left the state, until 1932, Dupré was a Democratic member of the Louisiana House of Representatives. He served as a state district court judge by election from 1896 to 1900 and by appointment in 1914. He was elected judge in 1916, 1920, and 1924, while he also served in the part-time legislative post. Such dual office-holding is no longer permitted. Judge Dupré, as he was long known, was a member of the Louisiana Constitutional Convention of 1921. In his second stint in the legislature, his successors included his son-in-law, Felix Octave Pavy, a prominent St. Landry Parish physician and an uncle by marriage of Dr. Carl Weiss, the assassin of U.S. Senator Huey Pierce Long, Jr.

The editor of the former New Orleans Item referred to Representative Dupré's steadfast opposition to tax increases:

There was a statesman in Tennessee who attributed his popularity to the fact that he had never voted for a tax or against an appropriation. We might almost say of Judge Dupré that we do not recall his ever having voted for a tax increase, salary increase, or for an increased appropriation.

The position of the twelfth man in opposition to eleven stubborn jurors is one which the judge is not afraid to take in a world which loves to have unanimous action and where kickers are generally made uncomfortable.

In 1881, Dupré married Julia B. Estilette (1860–1944) of Opelousas, the daughter of his law partner, E. D. Estilette. She was born in New Haven, Connecticut, where her father was attending Yale University. E. D. Estilette was a judge and in 1876 the Speaker of the Louisiana House of Representatives. The couple had four children, including twin daughters, a son, and a third daughter. He was a member of the Benevolent and Protective Order of Elks. Dupré outlived his wife by two years. They are interred along with other family members at the Myrtle Grove Cemetery in Opelousas.

To retaliate against Dupré, Long had a hole drilled in the roof directly above Dupre's office in the Old Louisiana State Capitol to punish Dupré for the lawmaker's opposition to a new capitol building. When he demanded that Governor Huey Long repair the problem at once, Long said that he would do so only if Dupré would vote for the planned new Louisiana State Capitol building, to be built in skyscraper format. When Dupré refused to commit his vote, Long told him, "Die, damn you, in the faith!" Long then noted that Dupré "was much amused and almost came over."

Political offices
Preceded by Aurle Arnaud Albert Guidry; John C. Lyons Placide Robin	Louisiana State Representative for St. Landry Parish; 1888–1892; Served alongside: Albert Guidry and Dr. G. C. Martin)	Succeeded by Nap McBride George Pulford; Adolph Stagg Henry D. Larcade Jr.
Preceded by A. H. Garland	Louisiana State Representative for St. Landry Parish; 1913–1932; Served alongside: eight other members over nineteen years)	Succeeded by Felix Octave Pavy Isom J. Guillory George K. Perrault
