= Louis A. Wiltz =

American politician (1843–1881)

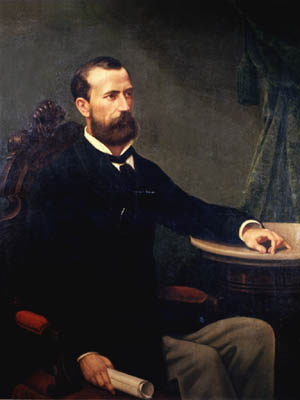
- Portrait by Theodore Sidney, 1879.

29th Governor of Louisiana
- In office January 14, 1880 – October 16, 1881
- Lieutenant: Samuel D. McEnery
- Preceded by: Francis T. Nicholls
- Succeeded by: Samuel D. McEnery

15th Lieutenant Governor of Louisiana
- In office April 24, 1877 – January 14, 1880
- Governor: Francis T. Nicholls
- Preceded by: Caesar Antoine
- Succeeded by: Samuel D. McEnery

25th Mayor of New Orleans
- In office November 30, 1872 – November 30, 1874
- Preceded by: Benjamin Flanders
- Succeeded by: Charles J. Leeds

Member of the Louisiana House of Representatives
- In office 1868

Personal details
- Born: January 21, 1843 New Orleans, Louisiana, US
- Died: October 16, 1881 (aged 38) New Orleans, Louisiana, US
- Party: Democratic
- Spouse: Micael Bienvenu
- Children: 7

Military service
- Allegiance: Confederate States
- Branch/service: Confederate States Army
- Years of service: 1861–1865
- Rank: Captain
- Unit: (Louisiana) Chalmette Regiment
- Battles/wars: American Civil War

Louis Alfred Wiltz (January 21, 1843 – October 16, 1881) was an American politician from the state of Louisiana. He served as 29th governor of Louisiana from 1880 to 1881 and before that time was the mayor of New Orleans, lieutenant governor of Louisiana, and a member of the Louisiana House of Representatives.

== Biography ==
Wiltz was born on January 21, 1843 in New Orleans to J.B. Theophile Wiltz and the former Louise Irene Villanueva. His paternal family were among the first German settlers in Louisiana and his mother came from a noble Spanish family, her father coming to Louisiana with the Spanish Army. He attended public school until the age of 15, when he began work with Plauche and Company. After the company failed, Wiltz became the clerk for the Second District Court of Louisiana. With the outbreak of the American Civil War, Wiltz joined the Confederate States Army as a private but quickly rose to the rank of captain. In 1863, Wiltz married Micael Bienvenu of St. Martinville, the seat of St. Martin Parish. They had four daughters and one son.

In 1868, Wiltz was elected to the Louisiana House of Representatives and the New Orleans School Board. In 1872, he was elected mayor but could not take office until January 1873 because of the refusal of the Republican mayor to vacate the office. In addition to serving two years as mayor, Wiltz was once again elected to the Louisiana House of Representatives and served as lieutenant governor. He was succeeded by E. D. Estilette.

With the implementation of the new Louisiana state constitution of 1879, the gubernatorial term of Francis T. Nicholls was cut short by one year. An election was held in 1879, and Louis Wiltz easily defeated his Republican opponent. Wiltz's term as governor was one rife with corruption. The corrupt Louisiana Lottery continued to have influence over the state legislature. The state treasurer, Edward A. Burke, embezzled state funds while the public schools were neglected, and black disenfranchisement continued.

Wiltz died of tuberculosis while in office on October 16, 1881, in New Orleans. Lieutenant Governor Samuel D. McEnery, a fellow Democrat, succeeded Wiltz.

== See also ==
- List of minority governors and lieutenant governors in the United States

Party political offices
Preceded by Francis T. Nicholls	Democratic nominee for Governor of Louisiana; 1879	Succeeded by Samuel D. McEnery
Political offices
Preceded by Benjamin F. Flanders	Mayor of New Orleans; November 30, 1872 – November 30, 1874	Succeeded by Charles J. Leeds
Preceded by Charles W. Lowel	Speaker of the Louisiana House of Representatives (disputed); 1875; Served alongside: Michael Hahn	Succeeded by E. D. Estilette (Wheeler Compromise)
Preceded by C.C. Antoine	Lieutenant Governor of Louisiana; 1877–1880	Succeeded by Samuel D. McEnery
Preceded by Francis T. Nicholls	Governor of Louisiana; 1880–1881	Succeeded by Samuel D. McEnery
