= Cornelia Adele Strong Fassett =

American painter

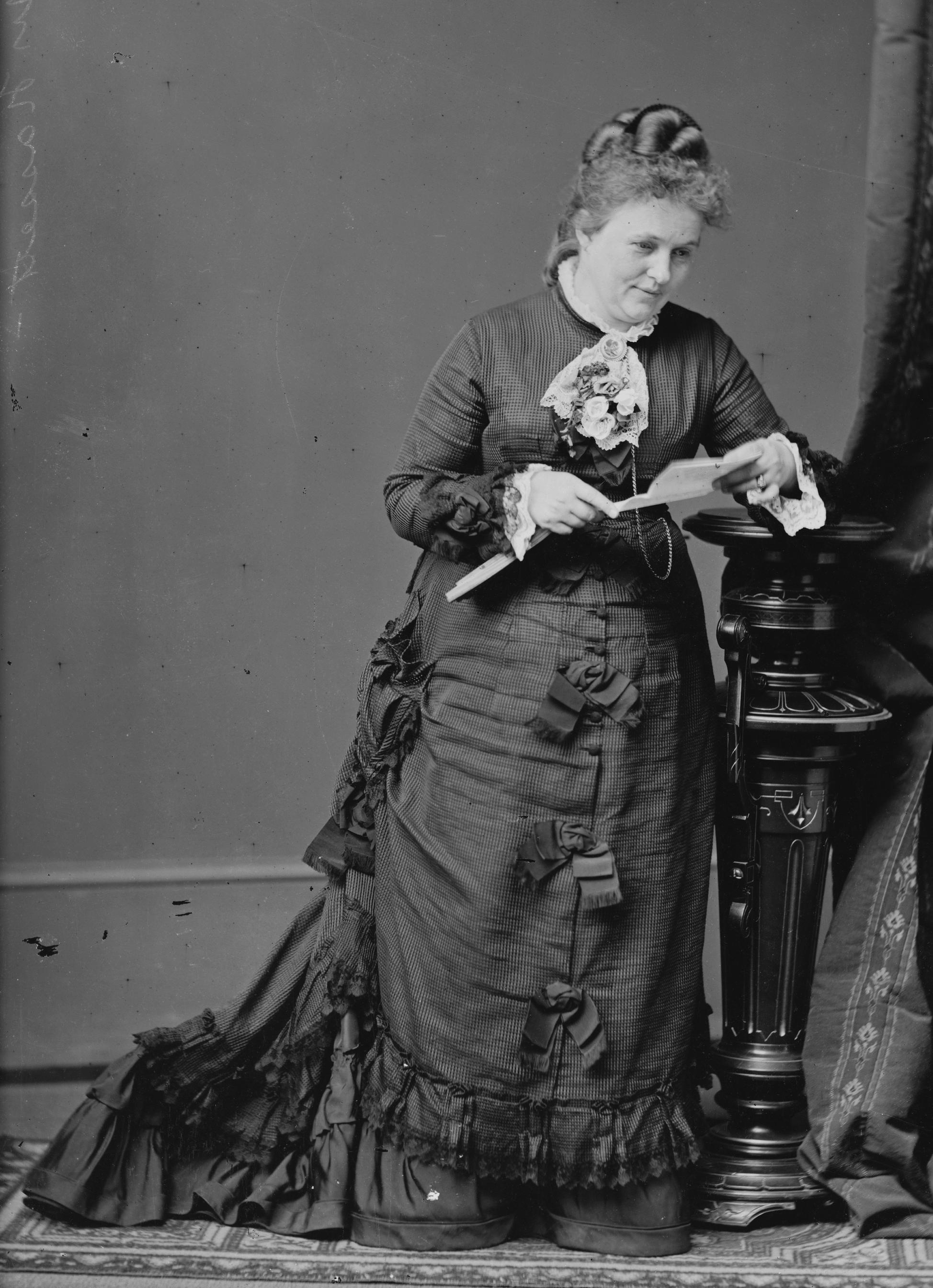
- Cornelia Adele Strong Fassett. Photo, Library of Congress
- Born: November 9, 1831; Owasco, New York
- Died: January 4, 1898 (aged 66); Washington, D.C.
- Known for: "The Florida Case before the Electoral Commission"
- Spouse: Samuel Montague Fassett (m. 1851)

Cornelia Adele Strong Fassett (November 9, 1831 – January 4, 1898) was an American painter. She painted portraits of politicians. Her most famous work is her painting of the Electoral Commission of 1877.

== Biography ==
Cornelia Adele Strong was born in Owasco, New York, the third of six children of Captain Walker Strong and Sarah Devoe Strong. Cornelia married artist and photographer, Samuel Montague Fassett, in 1851.

She then studied in New York City, with Scottish artist J.B. Wandesforde, who taught her how to paint miniatures. Cornelia Fassett spent three years in both Paris and Rome studying under Giuseppe Castiglione, Henri Fantin La Tour, and Lambert Joseph Matthew. After an early career in Chicago, Fassett and her husband moved to Washington, D.C., in 1875, where she painted successful documentary portraits of notable government figures and he was photographer to the Supervising Architect of the Treasury. A year after their move, her 1876 group portrait of the Supreme Court justices was exhibited at the Philadelphia Centennial Exposition.

After her death the Washington Post described Cornelia Fassett as "one of the best known artists and portrait painters in the United States."

== The Florida Case Before the Electoral Commission ==
The Florida Case Before the Electoral Commission

The Florida Case Before the Electoral Commission is a massive historical painting created by Fassett between 1877 and 1878. It depicts an Electoral Commission's meeting in relation to the disputed U.S. presidential election of 1876.

Fassett was not commissioned to produce the painting of the Electoral Commission’s 1877 meeting, but created it independently. She was able to set up a temporary studio in the U.S. Capitol’s Supreme Court Chamber, during the summers of 1877 and 1878 while the Court was not in session.

The completed work, in oil paint on canvas, measured 75 inches in width and 60 inches in height. It was signed "C. Adele Fassett / 1879". The painting depicts 256 people, including 60 women some are wives and daughters, others are professionals (including 17 journalists in the gallery). Fassett also includes herself, as well as another female artist, Imogene Robinson Morrell and the writer Mary Clemmer Ames.

Included in the painting were almost every person involved in the political crisis. Other prominent city figures were included too, for example James G. Blaine, who had unexpectedly lost the Republican nomination to Hayes. Banker and art collector William Wilson Corcoranis portrayed in the row just below the commissioners. Not all of the individuals depicted attended the hearings and Fassett based some of the characters on photographic portraits by Mathew Brady.

Fassett’s painting is comparable to Samuel F.B. Morse’s much larger work, The Old House of Representatives, completed in 1822. Morse's work shows the House Chamber from the same viewpoint, though it includes almost three times fewer persons. While Fassett has to crowd her figures into receding rows, Morse was able to compose his people into groups. Fassett would have known Morse’s painting, because it had been publicly displayed at the Corcoran Gallery of Art in Washington, D.C.

Fassett's painting attracted much criticism from the newspapers and the Pennsylvania Academy of the Fine Arts. Congress eventually agreed to buy the painting seven years after its completion. They paid $7,500 (much less than was asked). The painting remains in the painting collection of the Supreme Court of the United States.

== Portrait of Martha J. Lamb (1878) ==
Described as "one of her finest portraits". Fassett used Martha J. Lamb's home library, to showcase the literary figure, sitting her among stacks of books and Renaissance furnishings. In 1886, a writer for the New York Column, "Gossip of Noted Ladies" mentions that "One of the striking features of the study is a beautiful painting by Mrs. Fassett of Washington representing its interior and Mrs. Lamb seated in a large crimson armchair which throws into capital relief her fine face and handsome figure." Originally the painting was exhibited at the National Academy of Design in 1878, but later moved to the New York Historical Society, where it remains today.

== Other notable works ==
- Pastel portrait of Abraham Lincoln (1860), later claimed to be the first portrait Lincoln ever sat for. Now in the collection of Chicago Public Library.
- Portrait of Ulysses S. Grant - put on show at the 1893 Chicago World's Columbian Exposition
- Portrait of Martha J. Lamb (1878), described as "one of her finest portraits".
- Portrait of Chief Justice Morrison R. Waite - now in the painting collection of the Supreme Court of the United States.
