= Elizabeth Jane Gardner =

American painter (1837–1922)

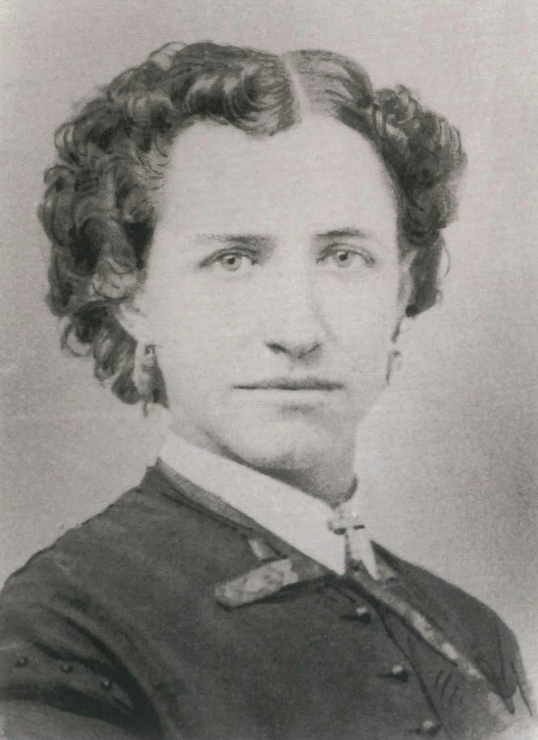
- Gardner c. 1860
- Born: October 4, 1837; Exeter, New Hampshire, U.S.
- Died: January 28, 1922 (aged 84); Paris, France
- Education: Young Ladies' Female Academy, Exeter, NH; Lasell Female Seminary, Auburndale, MA
- Known for: Painting
- Spouse: William-Adolphe Bouguereau (m. 1896; died 1905)

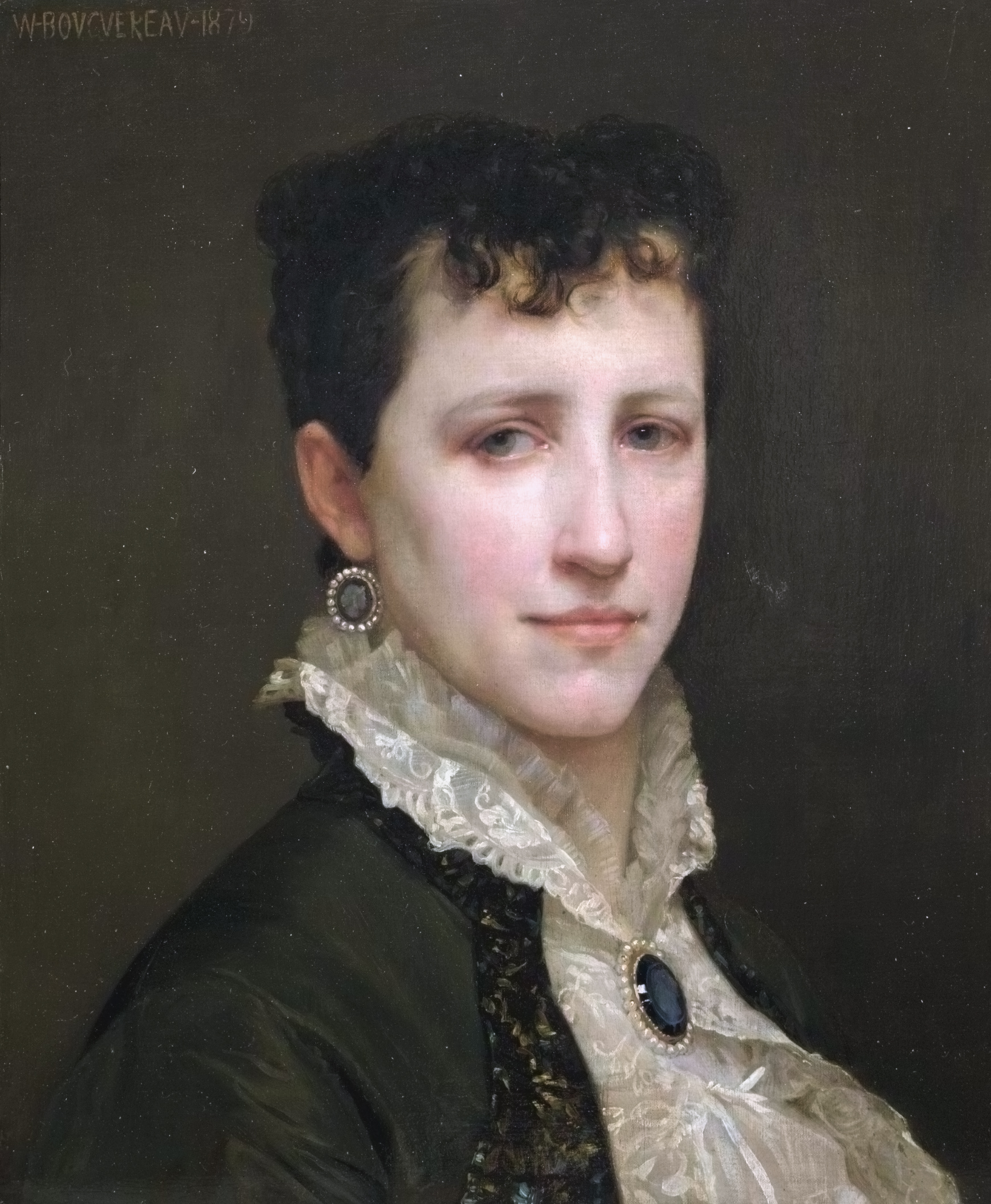
Portrait de Mademoiselle Elizabeth Gardner by William-Adolphe Bouguereau, 1879, Chimei Museum, Tainan, Taiwan

Elizabeth Jane Gardner Bouguereau (October 4, 1837 – January 28, 1922) was an American academic and salon painter, who was born in Exeter, New Hampshire. She was an American expatriate who died in Paris where she had lived most of her life. She studied in Paris under the figurative painter Hugues Merle (1823–1881), the well-known salon painter Jules Joseph Lefebvre (1836–1911), and finally under William-Adolphe Bouguereau (1825–1905). After Bouguereau's wife died, Gardner became his paramour and after the death of his mother, who bitterly opposed the union, she married him in 1896. She adopted his subjects, compositions, and even his smooth facture, channeling his style so successfully that some of her work might be mistaken for his. In fact, she was quoted as saying, "I know I am censured for not more boldly asserting my individuality, but I would rather be known as the best imitator of Bouguereau than be nobody!"

Gardner's best known work may be The Shepherd David Triumphant (1895), which shows the young shepherd with the lamb he has rescued. Among her other works were Cinderella, Cornelia and Her Jewels, Corinne, Fortune Teller, Maud Muller, Daphnis and Chloe, Ruth and Naomi, The Farmer's Daughter, The Breton Wedding, and some portraits.

== Early life and art education ==
Gardner first attended the Young Ladies' Female Academy in Exeter and then moved on to the Lasell Female Seminary in Auburndale, Massachusetts, where she studied art and languages, learning English, French, Italian and German. She graduated in 1856 and spent the next few years teaching French at a newly opened school in Worcester, Massachusetts. In 1864, after teaching art at Lasell Seminary, she and Imogene Robinson left for France. To pay her rent, she spent her time copying paintings by contemporary artists and older masters in prestigious galleries. Later, in the autumn of that year, Gardner decided to apply to the École des Beaux-Arts. This school was known as the most prestigious art academy in Paris. Her application was rejected. Like most if not all art establishments at that time the school was male only. The ban on women's applications was not lifted until 1897, thirty-five years after Gardner had applied. However, Gardner did not give up. She continued to enroll in private classes and to build an outstanding portfolio of art work.

== Career ==
Soon after Gardner arrived in Paris with her former teacher, Imogene Robinson, she began copying pictures at the Luxembourg Museum, and Gardner's studio became a place where Americans requested commissioned copies of their favorite European paintings. In a letter to her brother, Gardner noted, "Americans are buying many pictures. I have always had the satisfaction of pleasing those for whom I have painted. One gentleman was so satisfied with a copy I did for him that he paid me more than I asked." She briefly studied with Jean-Baptiste-Ange Tissier before leaving in 1865 to join an independent cooperative women's studio.

In 1868, Gardner was the first American woman to exhibit at the Paris Salon. Also during that time period, her paintings were accepted in 25 Paris Salons. Awarded a gold medal at the 1872 Salon, she became the first woman ever to receive such an honor. Gardner Bouguereau's works were accepted to the Salon more than any other woman painter in history and more than all but a few of the men.

The biggest challenge to her training was the restriction on women studying anatomy from nude models. She circumvented this restriction by donning male attire to gain admittance to the all-male drawing school at Manufacture Nationale des Gobelins et de la Savonnerie. In 1873, Gardner was finally admitted to the previously all-male Académie Julian, where she studied with Jules-Joseph Lefebvre and Bouguereau.

Gardner exhibited her work at the Palace of Fine Arts and The Woman's Building at the 1893 World's Columbian Exposition in Chicago, Illinois.

== Relationship with Bouguereau ==
Gardner's relationship with William-Adolphe Bouguereau was widely known and discussed within the Parisian artistic community. They made no secret of their relationship over the course of an engagement that was to last seventeen years. The couple courted for seventeen years because they had a great fear of crossing Bouguereau's mother. When she died in 1896 at the age of 91, the couple did not waste any time in getting married. Mary French, wife of the American sculptor Daniel Chester French later recalled that she had "interesting memories...of Bouguereau's studio, where we used to go often, and where was also Miss Jennie Gardner of Exeter, New Hampshire, whom he either married or didn't marry – I have forgotten the details. There was a certain glamour of that young woman of Puritan birth, a contemporary of my Puritan aunts, living there in the Latin Quarter and doing something that all Paris talked about."

== Personal attributes ==
Like the artist Rosa Bonheur, she applied to the police for a permit that would allow her to wear men's attire so she could attend life classes at the famous Gobelins tapestry works. She was a businesswoman and a polyglot, switching easily from her native English to French, Italian or German in order to make her guests and potential clients feel at ease. She excelled in the social graces and knew how to manage publicity and nurture relationships that would help further her career. Her ability to work her way into the social networks in Paris earned her sales and portrait commissions.

== Cultural significance of La Confidence ==
One of Gardner's most well-known works, La Confidence (ca. 1880) is in the collection of the Georgia Museum of Art. This painting depicts an intimate, whispered secret between two young peasant girls. The painting was given to the Lucy Cobb Institute, an all-girls school in Athens, Georgia. Hung in the drawing room parlor of the school, the work was beloved in the school's collection and was viewed as having a "moralizing purpose" for the young girls enrolled in the finishing school. In 1991, painter, filmmaker and University of Georgia filmmaker James Herbert (director) appropriated Gardner's painting and several others from the Georgia Museum of Art's collection and reinterpreted the image in the video for Athens band R.E.M.'s song "Low" from the album Out of Time.

== Gallery ==
Gardner's work bears a strong resemblance to that of her husband, William-Adolphe Bouguereau

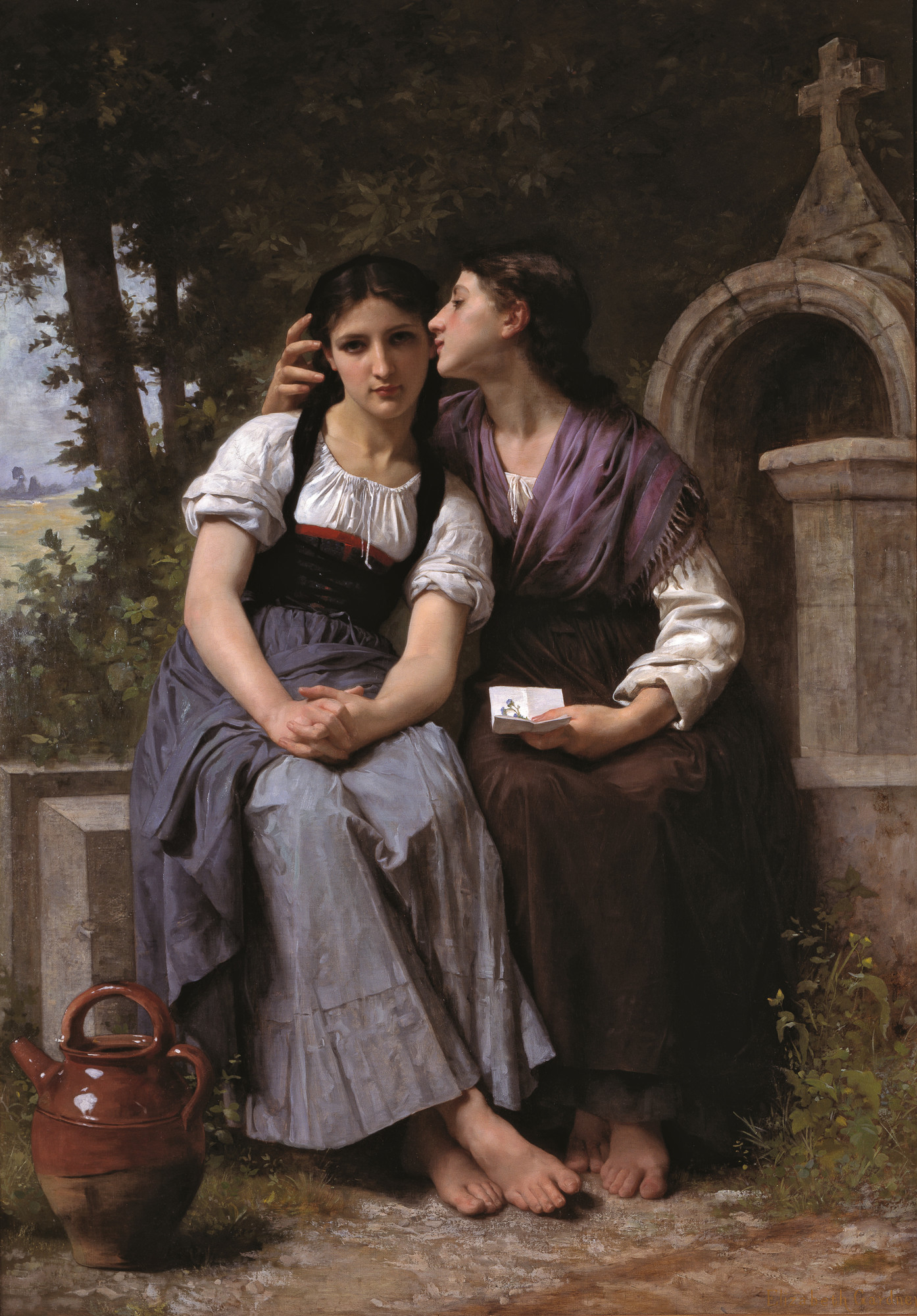
La Confidence (1880)

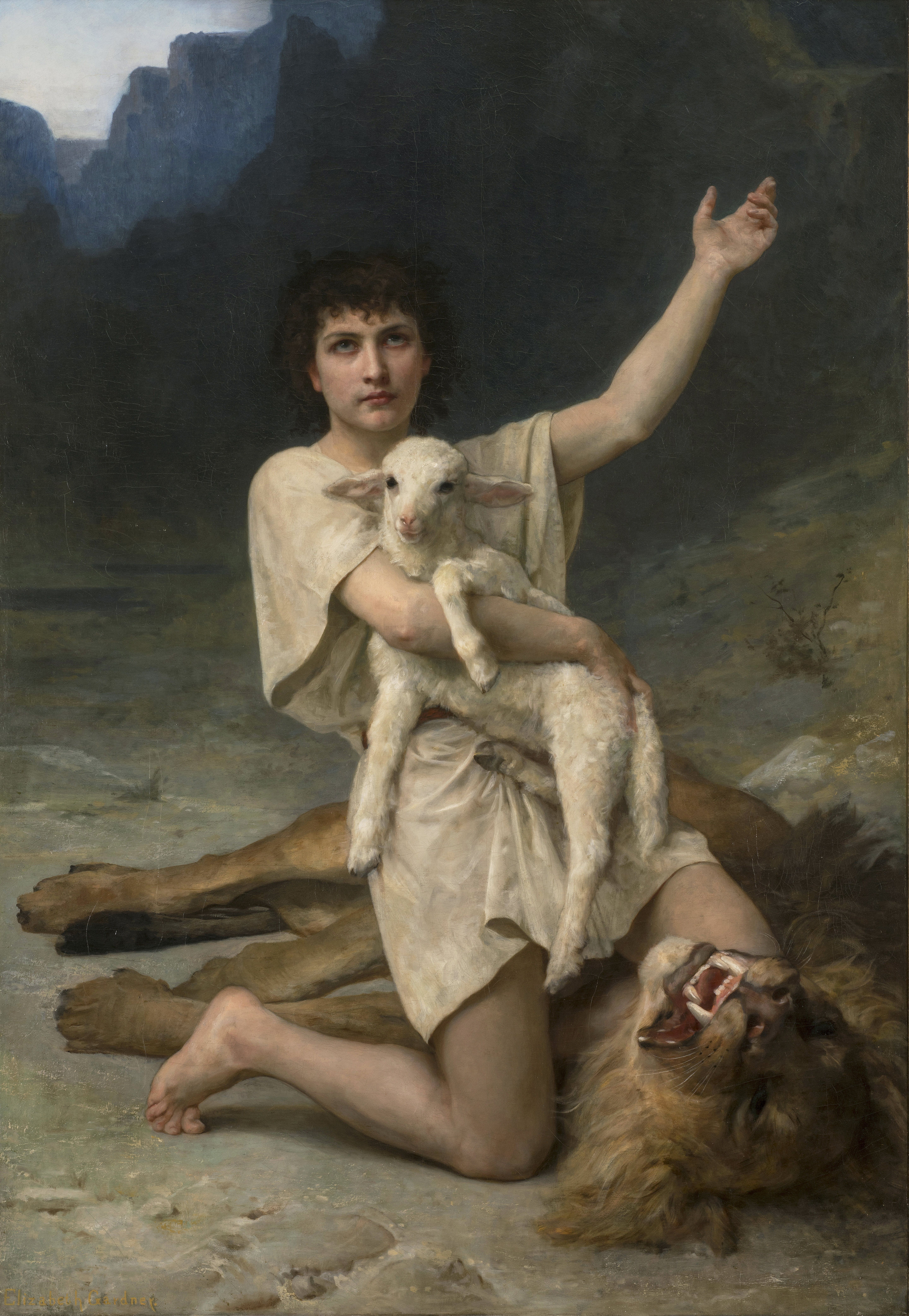
David the Shepherd

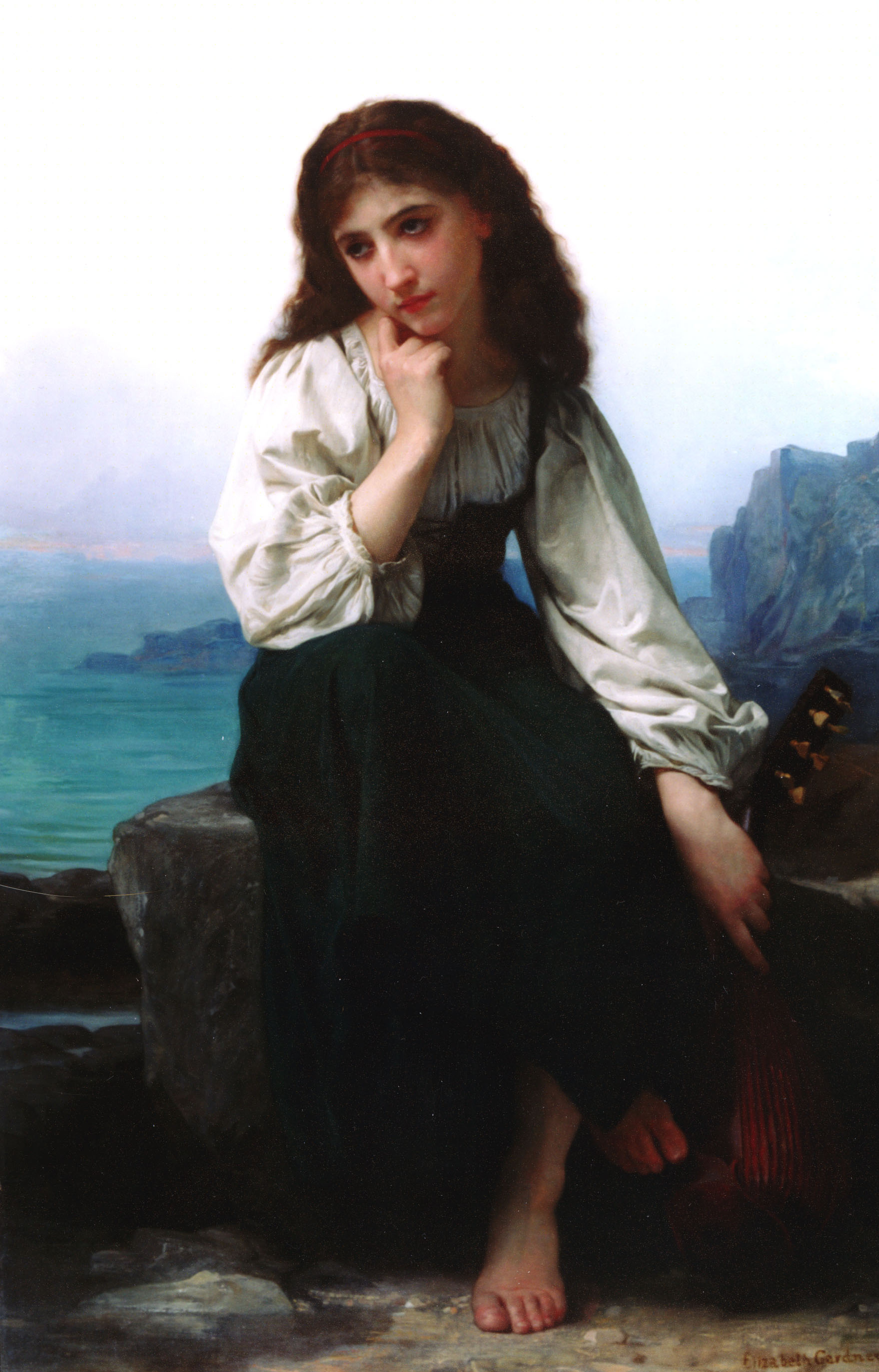
Gardner-Garde – Similar to Bouguereau's The Bohemian

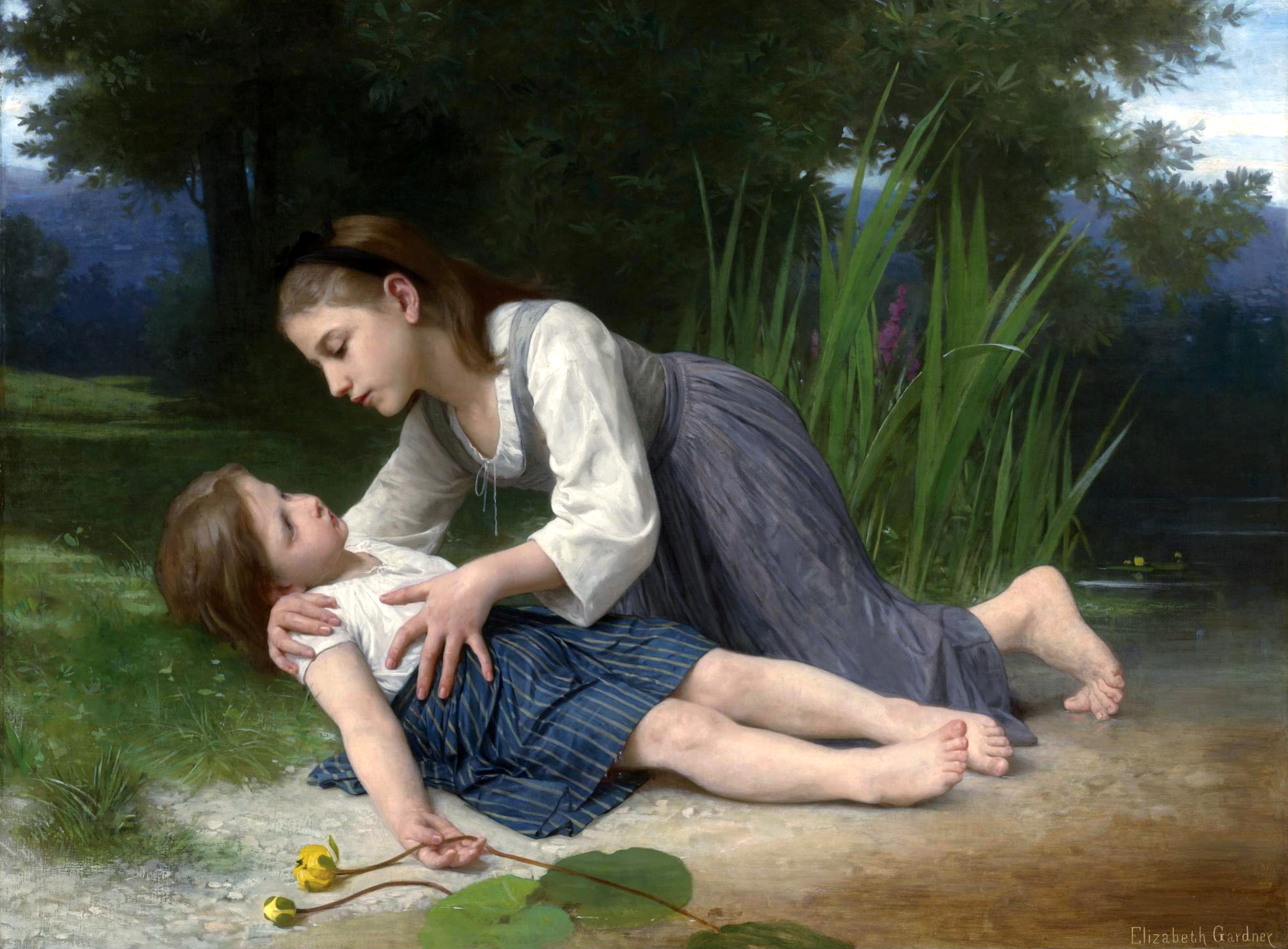
The Imprudent Girl

== Bibliography ==
- Pearo, Charles. "Elizabeth Jane Gardner (1837–1922): Tracing the Construction of Artistic Identity" (Dissertation, University of Pittsburgh, 2002).
- Pearo, Charles. "Elizabeth Jane Gardner: 'the Best Imitator of Bouguereau'." In In the Studios of Paris: William Bouguereau and His American Students, edited by James Frederick Peck, 59–78. New Haven: Exhibition catalog from the Philbrook Museum of Art distributed by Yale University Press, 2006.
- Fidell-Beaufort, "Elizabeth Jane Gardner Bouguereau: A Parisian Artist from New Hampshire," Archives of American Art Journal 24 (1984), 2–3.
- Adler, Hirscher, Weinberg, Americans in Paris: 1860–1900, Exhibition Catalog, National Gallery Company Limited, 2006
