= Imogene Robinson Morrell =

American painter

Imogene Robinson Morrell (1828 – 21 November 1908) was an American portrait and historical painter, who won many medals and diplomas.

== Early life ==
Born in Attleboro, Massachusetts, Imogene Robinson was the daughter of Otis and Sarah Dean (Raymond) Robinson. She studied art in Newark, New Jersey and New York City and then taught art in the Massachusetts towns of Charlestown and Auburndale. In the 1850s she taught at the School of Design in Worcester, Massachusetts with her friend and artist Elizabeth Gardner. In 1856 she went to Europe, where she studied art in Düsseldorf (where she studied with Adolf Schroedter and Wilhelm Camphausen) and Paris. In 1869 she married Colonel Abram Morrell but continued to live with Gardner. In 1879 she became a widow. In 1876 she moved to Washington, D.C. She was a very active member of the art community. While in Washington, D.C. she was a founding member of the National Academy of Fine Arts. She was the director of the National Academy of Fine arts for the next ten years.

== Career ==
Imogene Robinson Morrell was a history painter. Her paintings were patriotic and contained images of historical figures, often with horses. Two of her most praised paintings, Washington Welcoming the Provision Trains and First Battle of the Puritans, were exhibited in 1876 at the National Academy of Design in New York City. She painted portraits of a number of famous people, including General John A. Dix, John C. Spencer, Howell Cobb, Mrs. Cleveland, Collis P. Huntington, W. W. Corcoran, and U. S. President Garfield. Her portrait of General John A. Dix hangs in the United States Capitol Building.

In 1876, The Boston Journal said of her paintings, "They are spoken of in terms of the highest admiration by artists and art-critics, both home and abroad. They are the result of long years of study and labor, under the first masters in France and Germany, and show great genius, inspired by patriotic enthusiasm...The composition is strictly original in all its details: each figure and every animal was painted from a living model, after the strictest rules of genuine art." That same year, the Century Illustrated Monthly Magazine wrote, "Mrs. Morrell's pictures have great and positive merits. They should get fame for any artist. It seems a little pitiful to say that they are wonderful for a woman. Let us rather say that they are honestly and faithfully executed works; that they are not above criticism, and that they do credit to American art."

== Later years and death ==
In 1896 more than 200 of her paintings in a Washington, D.C. warehouse were destroyed by fire, leaving her destitute. After the fire she was supported by her friend, Elizabeth Gardner Bougereau. Morrell died in Washington, D.C., in 1908.
