= 1876 Louisiana gubernatorial election =

- November 7, 1876
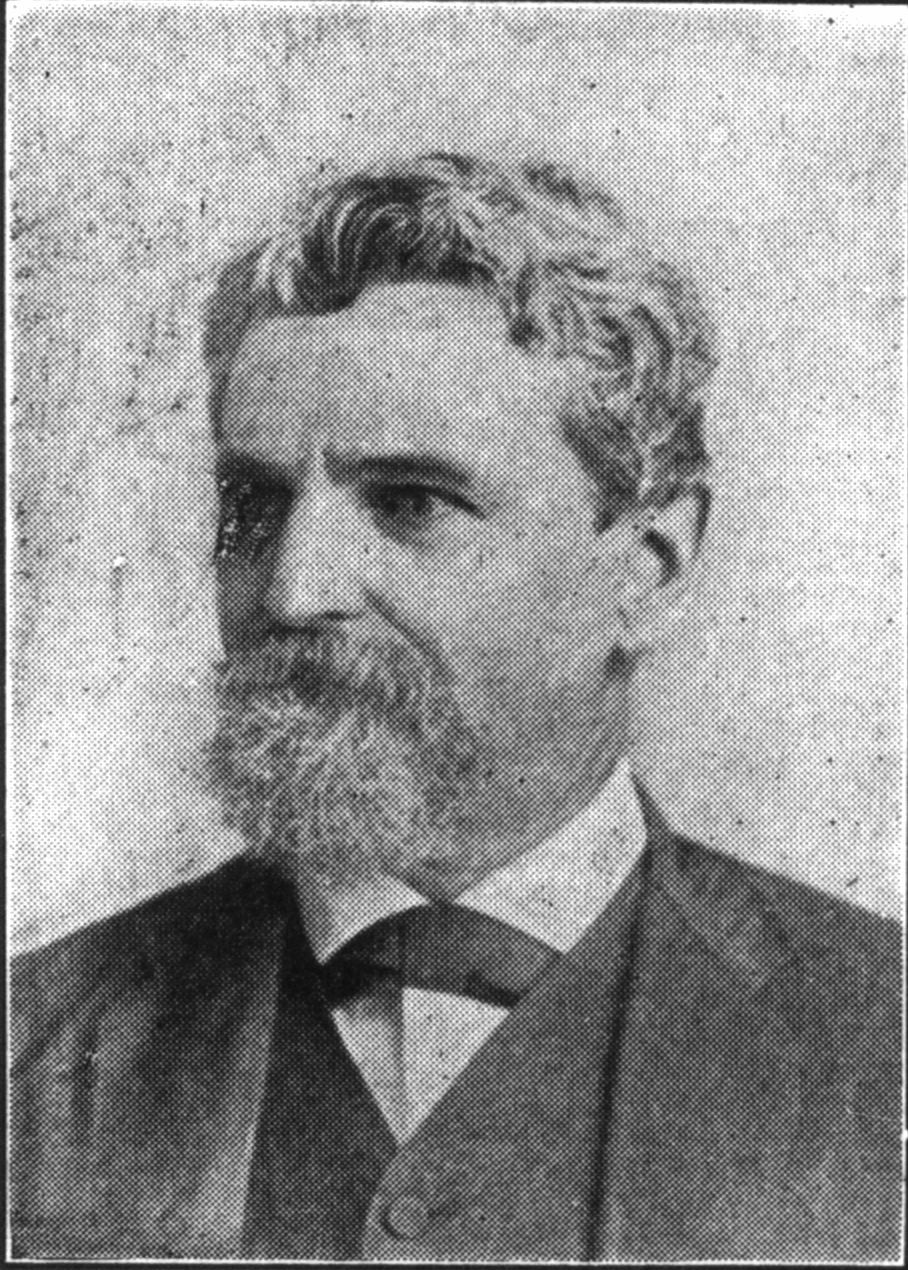

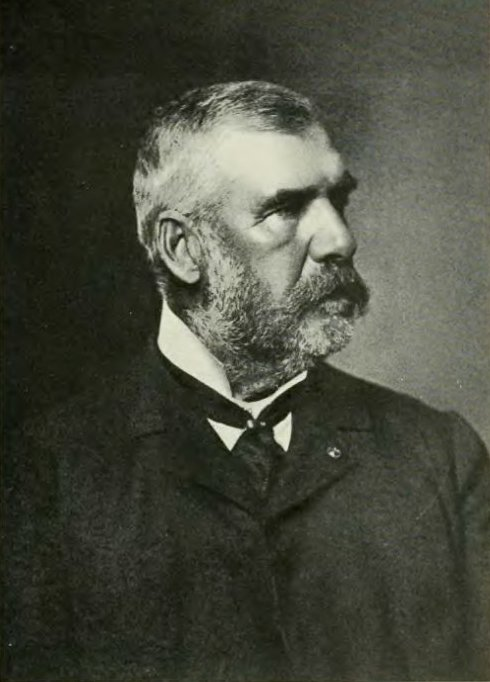
Nominee	Francis T. Nicholls	Stephen B. Packard
Party	Democratic	Republican
Popular vote	84,487	76,477
Percentage	52.49%	47.51%
- Parish Results; Nicholls: 50–60% 60–70% 70–80% 80–90% 90–100% Packard: 50–60% 60–70% 70–80% 80–90% Tie: 50%
Governor before election
William Pitt Kellogg
Republican
Elected Governor
Francis T. Nicholls
Democratic

The 1876 Louisiana gubernatorial election was the third and final election to take place under the Louisiana Constitution of 1868. As a result of this election Francis T. Nicholls became Governor of Louisiana, but not before the election was contested by his opponent. The results of this election, like those of 1872, were disputed. The dispute was possibly settled by the Compromise of 1877 which allegedly gave the Governor's Mansion to Democrat Francis T. Nicholls. The election of Nicholls marked the end of Reconstruction in Louisiana and the decline of the Republican Party of Louisiana.

== General election ==
=== Candidates ===
- Francis T. Nicholls, New Orleans attorney and former Confederate Army brigadier general (Democratic)
- Stephen B. Packard, U.S. Marshal for the District of Louisiana and former Union Army captain (Republican)

=== Results ===
Party	Candidate	Votes received	Percentage
Democratic	Francis T. Nicholls	84,487	52.49%
Republican	Stephen B. Packard	76,477	47.51%
Total Vote		160,964	

Preceded by 1872 Louisiana gubernatorial election	Louisiana gubernatorial elections	Succeeded by 1879 Louisiana gubernatorial election
