= Stephen B. Packard =

Louisiana politician

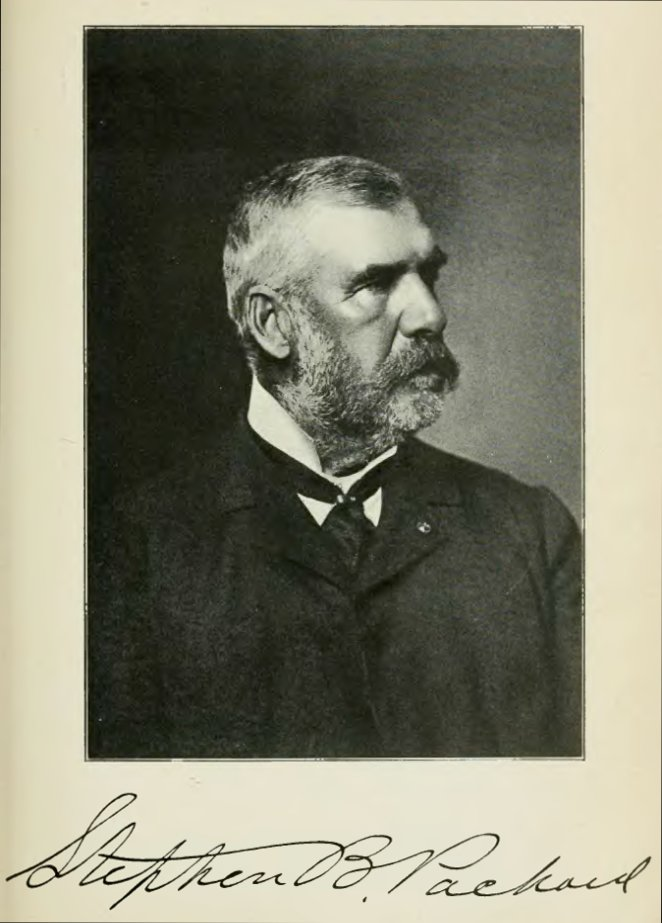

United States Consul to Liverpool
- In office July 1878 – July 1885
- Preceded by: Lucius Fairchild
- Succeeded by: Charles T. Russell

27th Governor of Louisiana
- In office January 8, 1877 – April 24, 1877
- Lieutenant: Caesar Antoine
- Preceded by: William P. Kellogg
- Succeeded by: Francis T. Nicholls

United States Marshal for the District of Louisiana
- In office April 16, 1869 – March 3, 1873
- Preceded by: Francis J. Herron
- Succeeded by: John R. G. Pitkin

Personal details
- Born: April 25, 1839 Auburn, Maine, U.S.
- Died: January 31, 1922 (aged 82) Seattle, Washington, U.S.
- Resting place: Evergreen-Washelli Memorial Park, Seattle, Washington
- Party: Republican
- Spouse: Emma Frances (Steele) Packard
- Children: 9
- Profession: Attorney; Farmer

Military service
- Allegiance: United States (Union)
- Branch/service: Union Army
- Years of service: 1861–1865
- Rank: Captain
- Unit: 12th Maine Infantry Regiment
- Commands: Company B, 12th Maine Infantry Regiment
- Battles/wars: American Civil War

Stephen Bennett Packard Sr. (April 25, 1839 – January 31, 1922) was a Republican politician in Reconstruction-era Louisiana. He ran for governor in 1876 against Democratic opponent Francis T. Nicholls, and at the end of the election both candidates claimed victory, leaving the matter to be resolved by President Rutherford B. Hayes. He was the last Republican to serve as Governor of Louisiana until Dave Treen took office in 1980.

== Biography ==
Born in Auburn, Maine, he attended the village schools and Westbrook Academy. In 1859, at the age of twenty he began the study of law, having previously taught school. He left the law office in 1861 to join the Twelfth Maine Volunteers as first lieutenant and was promoted to captain of Company B. The regiment was assigned to General B. F. Butler's Division, participating in the Louisiana campaign and the captures of New Orleans and Port Hudson. In 1864 Captain Packard served as Judge-Advocate in New Orleans, later joining his regiment which was with Sherman's army.

After the close of the war Captain Packard settled in New Orleans, engaged in the practice of law and in 1867 was elected delegate to the Constitutional Convention and was made chairman of the Board of Registration consisting of seven men who were charged with the duty of administering the civil affairs of the State from the adjournment in April until the inauguration of the State Government in July, 1868. He was appointed United States Marshal for Louisiana in 1869 by President Grant. As delegate to the Republican National Convention in 1876, he supported Blaine after it was seen to be impossible to nominate General Grant.

In November 1876, Packard was elected Governor of Louisiana and he was inaugurated in January, 1877. He served only a few months, as machinations surrounding the election results and the settlement of the 1876 presidential election enabled Democrats who favored an end to Reconstruction to take over the state government in April. A committee appointed by the Hayes faction obtained a quorum of members in the so-called Nichols Legislature by breaking up a quorum in the regular State Legislature which supported Governor Packard. This was a part of the arrangement which made Hayes President. In 1878 Governor Packard was appointed Consul to Liverpool, serving until 1885.

Coming to Iowa he purchased a large farm near Marshalltown which he made his permanent home. In 1893 he was a member of the Iowa Commission which had charge of the State exhibit at the World's Exposition. He was also on the Iowa Commission at the Trans-Mississippi Exposition at Omaha; and was one of the vice-presidents for Iowa at the Pan-American Exposition, and in the same year was elected a member of the State Board of Agriculture.

In 1905, Packard moved to Seattle, where he lived in retirement. He died in Seattle on January 31, 1922, and was buried at Evergreen-Washelli Memorial Park in Seattle.

Party political offices
Preceded by William Pitt Kellogg	Republican nominee for Governor of Louisiana; 1876	Succeeded by Taylor Beattie
Political offices
Preceded by William P. Kellogg	Governor of Louisiana; 1877	Succeeded by Francis T. Nicholls
