= St. John's Episcopal Church and Cemetery =

Historic church in Louisiana, United States

- U.S. National Register of Historic Places
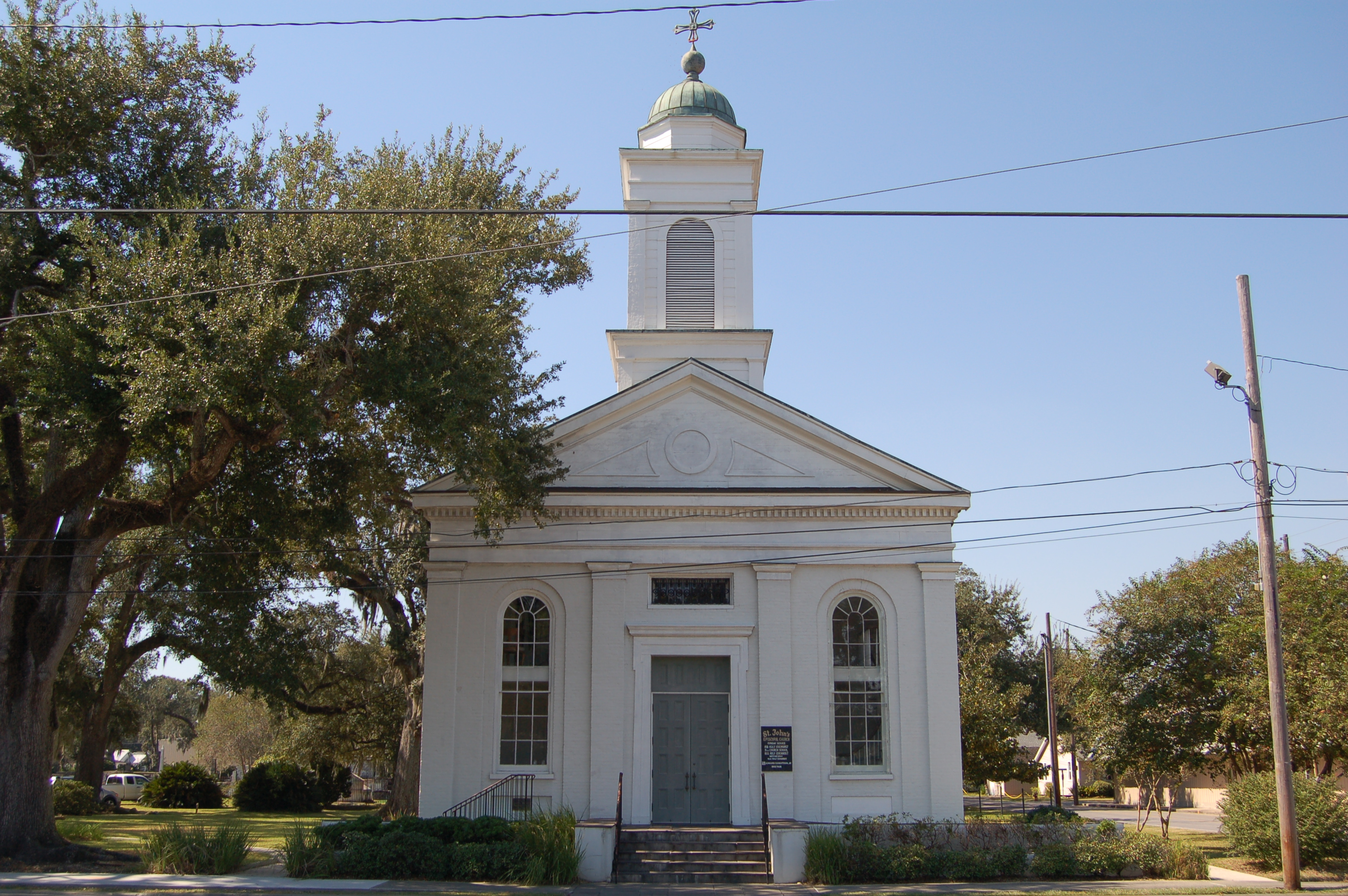

- Location within Louisiana Location within the United States
- Location: 718 Jackson Street, Thibodaux, Louisiana
- Coordinates: 29°47′38″N 90°49′25″W
- Area: 3.3 acres (1.3 ha)
- Built: 1843
- Architectural style: Greek Revival
- NRHP reference No.: 77000672
- Added to NRHP: September 13, 1977

St. John's Episcopal Church and Cemetery is a historic church located at 718 Jackson Street in Thibodaux, Louisiana.

Erected in 1843, the brick church was a Greek Revival building. Despite some alterations in 1867 or 1868 the building still retains its original architectural style. The bell was presented to the church in 1855, and it's possible that the cupola was not existing before this time. In 1856 the portico was enclosed to create a vestibule. The recessed chancel with domed ceiling was added in c.1867.

The 3.3 acres (1.3 ha) area, comprising the church and adjacent cemetery, was added to the National Register of Historic Places on September 13, 1977.

== See also ==
- National Register of Historic Places listings in Lafourche Parish, Louisiana
