= Wheeler Compromise =

Settlement of the 1872 Louisiana gubernatorial election

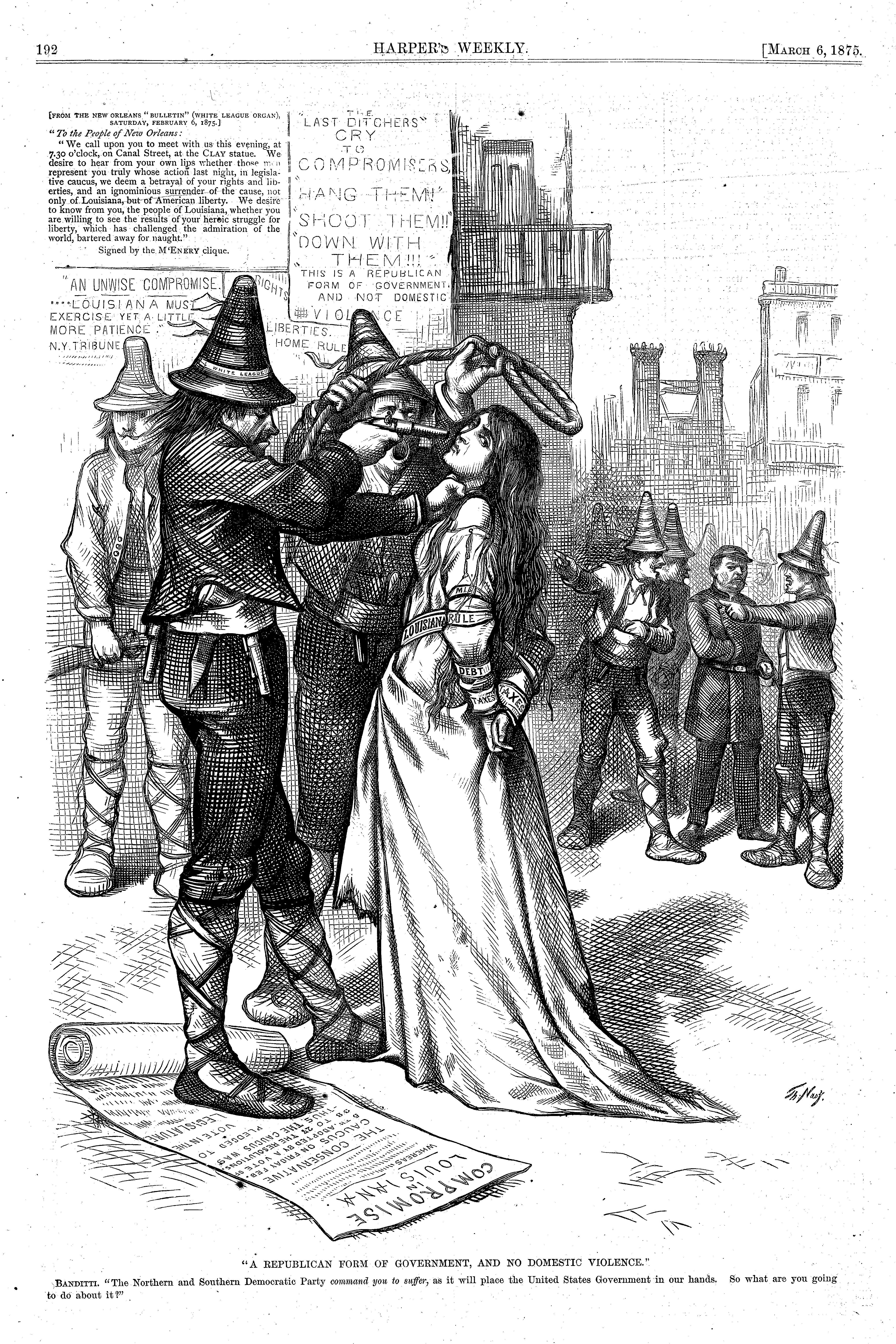
A political cartoon about the (Wheeler) Compromise in Louisiana, drawn by Thomas Nast for Harper's Weekly.

The Wheeler Compromise, sometimes known as the Wheeler Adjustment, was the settlement of the disputed gubernatorial election of 1872 in the U.S. state of Louisiana, and negotiation to organize the state's legislature in January 1875. It was negotiated by, and named after, William A. Wheeler, Congressman from New York and a member of the U.S. House Committee on Southern Affairs. He later was elected as Vice President of the United States.

The political disruption and continued violence in Louisiana was thought to show the unraveling of Reconstruction; Wheeler said it was the failure of trying to "promote peace with the sword." Republicans began to consider how to consolidate their strength in the North.

== Politics and state legislature ==
The political situation in Louisiana in 1872 was increasingly volatile and elections in the state were surrounded by violence. Democrats, nearly all white, struggled to suppress Republicans, nearly all black, from gathering or voting. After the disputed gubernatorial election of 1872, both Democrats and Republicans held inaugurations and appointed local officials. Eventually the federal government certified the election of the Republican candidate, William Pitt Kellogg as governor.

=== White militia ===
In 1873, white militia in Grant Parish turned out Republican parish officeholders and killed 80–100 black defenders which became known as the Colfax Massacre. By 1874, Confederate veterans of that action had formed the White League, a paramilitary group that formed chapters across the state. In the smaller Coushatta Massacre, several white Republicans were killed, as were 15-20 black witnesses.

In September 1874, in the Battle of Liberty Place, 5,000 members of the White League fought against about 3500 Metropolitan Police in an attempt to seize state buildings (which they occupied for three days) while attempting to throw out elected Republicans and seat John McEnery (D) as governor. More than 56 people were killed, mostly among the city's police and militia defenders. The White League retreated when federal troops entered the city and Kellogg was restored to office.

=== Federal troops ===
Governor Kellogg then asked for federal aid to prevent violence when the state legislature met for the first time on January 4, 1875, to organize the following elections. The entrance to the State House in New Orleans was monitored. General Philippe Régis de Trobriand, commanding the Thirteenth U.S. Infantry, had stationed forces around the building the night before.

The Returning Board had certified 54 Republicans and 52 Democrats as elected to the state legislature, with some five contested seats: for Bienville, De Soto, Grant and Winn parishes, to be settled by the legislature. When the members assembled, both parties had elected Speakers of the House, and the Democrats attempted to take over the legislature en masse, by having their elected Speaker, Louis A. Wiltz, former mayor of New Orleans, take the chair immediately when they entered the chamber. They later withdrew to caucus. Through Governor Kellogg, Republican House officials requested aid to clear the house of non-certified members. Each of the Democrats made a speech before leaving, and they withdrew as a group, moving out to a place in the city to address their supporters. Many people in the North criticized the use of federal forces in relation to the state legislature.

On the same day, the Democrats boycotted organizing the State Senate, while the 29 elected Republicans attempted to organize it alone. That night President Ulysses S. Grant ordered General Philip Sheridan to take control of the Gulf Department.

== Wheeler compromise ==
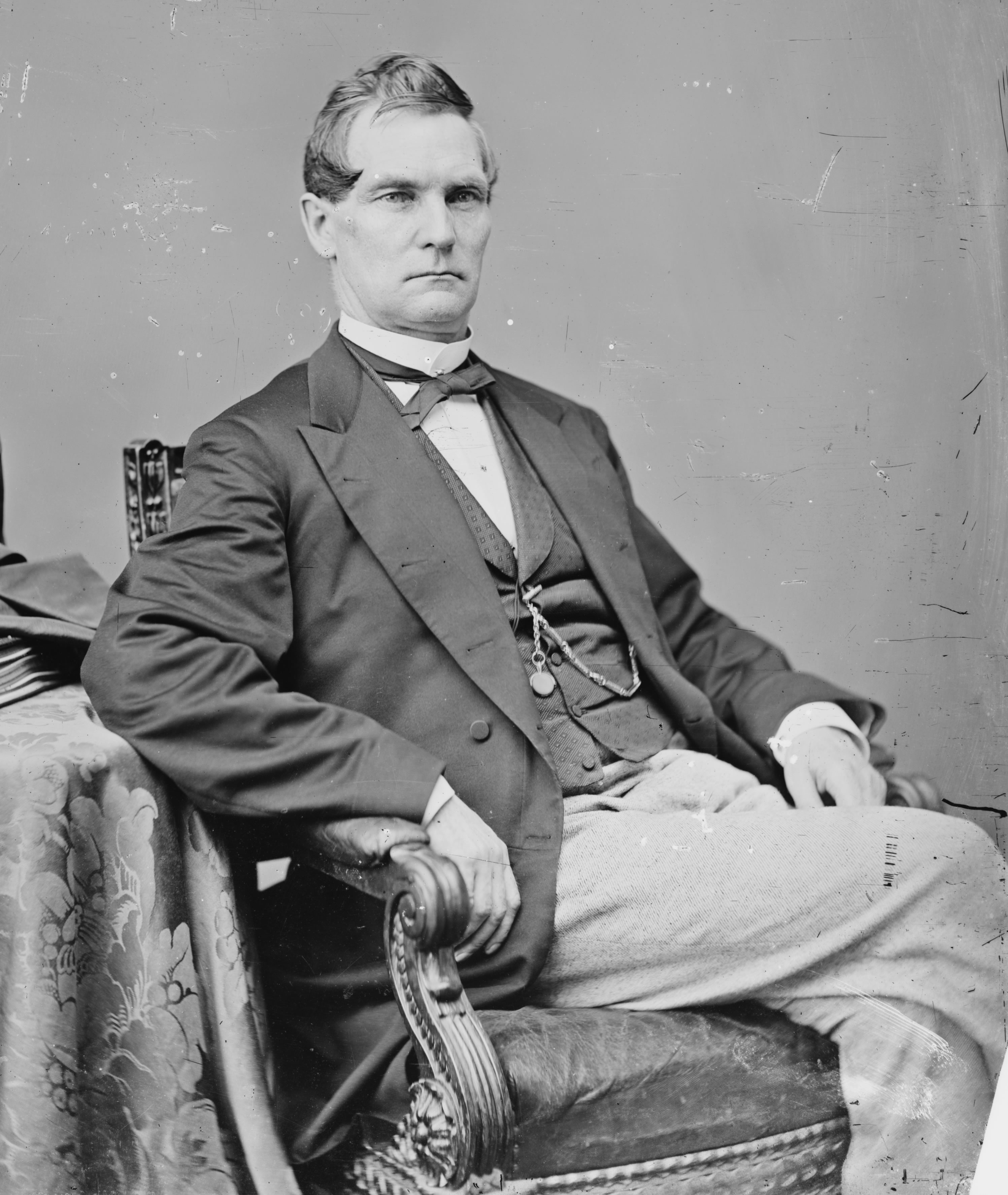
William A. Wheeler

As the situation in Louisiana worsened, Congressman William A. Wheeler of New York and other members of the House Committee on Southern Affairs went to New Orleans to investigate. They had already looked at some of the issues related to the elections of Kellogg and McEnery. They also heard testimony from both political parties as part of the work to support Reconstruction. The Democrats objected to federal troops having been used in the State House, and the Republicans to the actions by the Democrats.

Governor Kellogg was permitted to remain in power, while the House Committee arbitrated the seats disputed by the Returning Board. Most of these seats were awarded to the Democrats. In March 1875, the U.S. House of Representatives endorsed what became known as the Wheeler Compromise, although it appeared to concede that Reconstruction was unraveling in the state.

In Louisiana, the Democrats of Louisiana unseated additional Republicans to claim a majority and elect a Democrat to the Senate, but

most northern politicians and newspapers ignored the violations. The North seemed relieved to escape the responsibilities of Reconstruction. Representative Wheeler observed that northerners had expected too much from the South and declared that it was time to admit the failure of efforts to promote peace with the sword. His compromise taught northern Republicans how to cut their losses. Thereafter the party concentrated on preserving its power in the North while scaling down its military efforts in the South, even if that meant abandoning the political rights of the freedman.

The Democrats and Republicans met separately, effectively running distinct governments in the state. In 1876 they had another disputed gubernatorial election. President Grant refused to recognize the Republicans in Louisiana and South Carolina, both states marked by excessive election violence. The national Democratic Party agreed to a compromise to gain election of President Rutherford Hayes, and in early January 1877, Grant ordered the withdrawal of federal troops from New Orleans. Later that year, they were withdrawn from the rest of the state and others, and Reconstruction ended across the South.
