= Francis T. Nicholls =

American judge

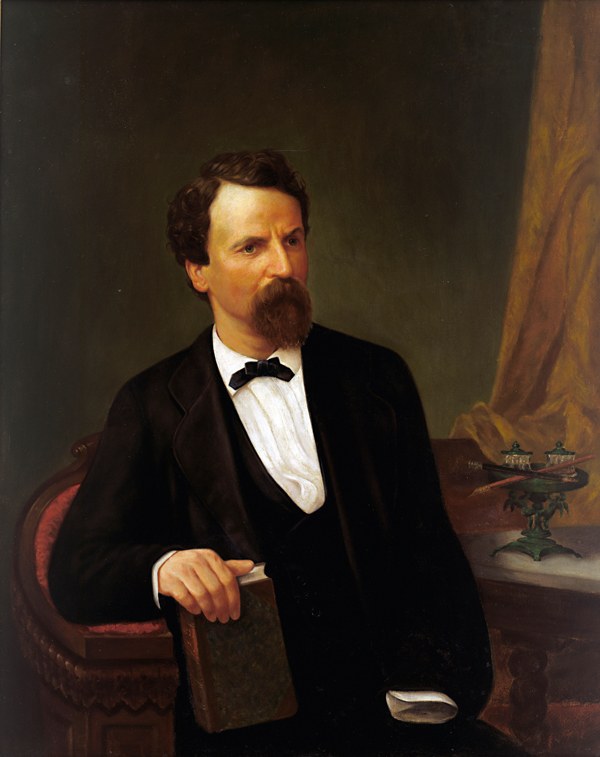

Associate Justice of the Louisiana Supreme Court
- In office April 5, 1904 – March 18, 1911

Chief Justice of the Louisiana Supreme Court
- In office April 5, 1892 – April 4, 1904
- Preceded by: Joseph Breaux
- Succeeded by: Charles Parlange

28th Governor of Louisiana
- In office May 20, 1888 – May 10, 1892
- Lieutenant: James Jeffries
- Preceded by: Samuel D. McEnery
- Succeeded by: Murphy J. Foster
- In office April 24, 1877 – January 14, 1880
- Lieutenant: Louis Wiltz
- Preceded by: Stephen B. Packard
- Succeeded by: Louis Wiltz

Personal details
- Born: August 20, 1834 Donaldsonville, Louisiana, U.S.
- Died: January 4, 1912 (aged 77) near Thibodaux, Louisiana, U.S.
- Resting place: St. John's Episcopal Church and Cemetery
- Party: Democratic
- Spouse: Caroline Zilpha Guion
- Children: 6
- Education: United States Military Academy

Military service
- Allegiance: United States; Confederate States
- Branch/service: United States Army; Confederate States Army
- Years of service: 1855–1856 (USA); 1861–1865 (CSA)
- Rank: Second Lieutenant (USA); Brigadier General (CSA)
- Battles/wars: American Civil War; First Battle of Bull Run; Valley Campaign of 1862; Battle of Winchester (WIA); Battle of Chancellorsville (WIA)

Francis Redding Tillou Nicholls (August 20, 1834 – January 4, 1912) was an American attorney, politician, and soldier who served as a Brigadier General in the Confederate States Army, the 28th Governor of Louisiana, and as Chief Justice of the Louisiana Supreme Court.

A veteran of the Civil War and a double amputee, Nicholls gained considerable popular support and served two nonconsecutive terms as Governor from 1877 to 1880, and again from 1888 to 1892. His time as Governor was marked by his moves against the reforms brought by the Radical Republicans during Reconstruction and his fight against state corruption. After becoming the Chief Justice of the State Supreme Court, he became an Associate Justice until his retirement in 1911.

== Early life and career ==
Francis Nicholls was born on August 20, 1834, in Donaldsonville, Louisiana, the seventh son of Thomas Clark Nicholls (himself a seventh son) and Louisa Hannah Nicholls. His father was a district judge and a veteran of the War of 1812, and his mother was the sister of the poet Joseph Rodman Drake and sister-in-law of Francis Redding Tillou. His paternal grandfather was Edward Church Nicholls, a Cornish immigrant to America. He was educated at Jefferson Academy in New Orleans.

After his father's death in 1847, Nicholls' mother sought an appointment for him to the United States Military Academy at West Point. She wrote to President James K. Polk in November 1848 seeking an appointment, but it went unanswered. His older brother Robert, a veteran of the Mexican American War, then wrote to President Zachery Taylor after his inauguration. With the endorsement of several Congressmen, Nicholls received a commission to West Point on March 3, 1851. Attending in the summer of 1851, he was roommates with Godfrey Weitzel and graduated in July 1855, ranking twelfth out of a class of thirty-four.

He was commissioned as a Brevet 2nd Lieutenant in the U.S. Army and deployed to Florida, being attached to the Second Regiment of Artillery. Most of the Second Regiment was stationed at Fort Myers, situated along the Caloosahatchee River, but Nicholls along with 11 other soldiers were sent to a smaller outpost called Fort Deynaud where he remained for several months. He was promoted to 2nd Lieutenant in the Second Regiment and sent to Fort Yuma in California for frontier duty. Citing illness and lack of action, Nicholls resigned from the Army on Oct 1, 1856.

Returning to Louisiana, Nicholls pursued a legal career and studied law at the University of Louisiana but did not graduate. He was admitted to the bar and joined the law office of his older brother Lawrence in Napoleonville. In 1860, Nicholls married Caroline Zilpha Guion, the daughter of a prominent sugar planter and jurist in Lafourche Parish. The couple had one son and five daughters. He owned five slaves.

== Civil War ==
Nicholls initially opposed the idea of secession, but after the Louisiana Secession Convention voted in favor of leaving The Union and later joined the Confederate States, he volunteered for military service. He and his brother Lawrence formed an infantry company from volunteers in Ascension Parish named The Phoenix Guards. The company was made part of the 8th Louisiana Infantry Regiment under the command of Colonel Henry B. Kelly with Nicholls being made Lieutenant Colonel. He trained the regiment and gained a reputation as a stern drill master and disciplinarian. The 8th Louisiana was deployed to Virginia and put on guard duty during the Battle of Bull Run. The regiment was then put under the command of General Richard Taylor in the Army of Northern Virginia.

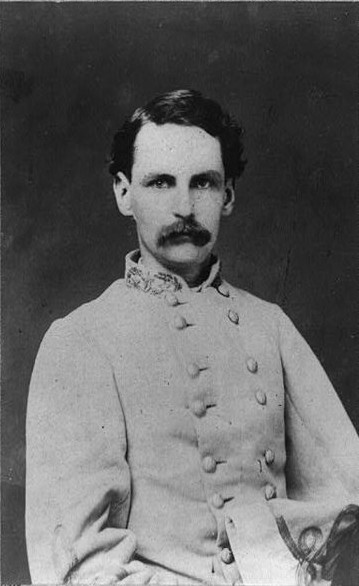
General Francis T. Nicholls in Confederate uniform.

In Spring 1862, Nicholls and his regiment participated in the Valley Campaign of General Stonewall Jackson. Jackson sought to capture the town of Winchester from Union troops and on May 25 ordered Taylor to take a ridge which was heavily defended. As Taylors brigade reached halfway up the ridge a Union cavalry charged attacked their left flank, which was occupied by the 8th Louisiana. Nicholls was ordered to withhold slightly, and they were able to repulse the cavalry charge. While pursuing the enemy, Nicholls had to cross two stone fences which exposed him to heavy fire, and he was shot in the left arm which shattered his elbow. After the Confederates took the town, Nicholls was left behind to recover as his injuries required that his left arm be amputated. After Jackson led his troops to continue the campaign, Union forces reentered Winchester and Nicholls was taken prisoner but later released in a prisoner exchange on September 21, 1862.

While on leave for a period of four months, Nicholls was promoted to Colonel and then to Brigadier General and given command of 2nd Louisiana Brigade. He was ordered to report to General Robert E. Lee then stationed in Fredericksburg, Virginia. When the Army of the Potomac under the command of Joseph Hooker launched a campaign to push Lee out of Fredericksburg, Nicholls was ordered to participate in a flanking maneuver to attack Hooker's right at Chancellorsville. While leading his brigade and attempting to clear obstacles in their path, Nicholls positions came under artillery fire. A shell cut through his horses' stomach, came out the other end, and severed his left foot. After being evacuated to the rear by his men, Nicholls retired from field command for the remainder of the war.

After a second convalesce leave, Nicholls was given administrative duties and named the Commandant of the Military District of Lynchburg, Virginia on August 11, 1863. Lynchburg, located west of Richmond, was an important railroad junction for supply routes. He was relieved of command in the summer of 1864 and transferred to the Trans-Mississippi Department in Marshall, Texas. He remained here until the end of the war.

In 1874, while testifying before a Congressional Committee investigating election fraud in Louisiana, Nicholls said of his service in the war; "I think that we made the attempt [the war for secession] under the most favorable circumstances...of course we all regret our want for success; but I do not believe that there is anywhere any desire for a renewal of the attempt." and that "My war record is a source of private misfortune without a corresponding gain to anyone. My services to my country were not worth the price to me. Every battle I went into I was wounded, and so I could not serve all the time."

== Political career ==
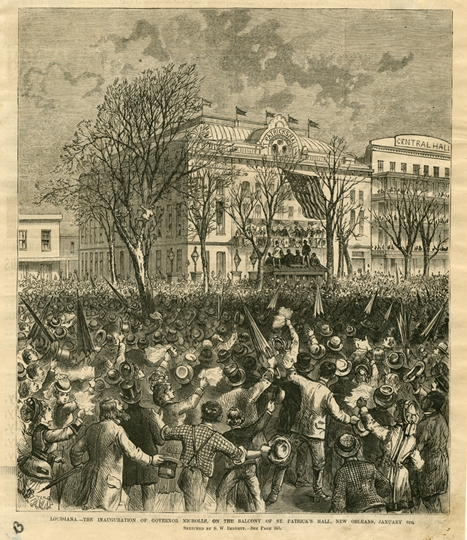
The inauguration of Governor Nicholls on the balcony of St. Patrick's Hall in New Orleans, January 8th, 1877.

Nicholls returned to his law practice after the war and became involved in Louisiana politics. He became a conservative Democrat and joined The Boston Club of New Orleans, an exclusive men's club. Becoming a prominent political figure due in part to his military record, Nicholls was selected as the Democratic candidate for the 1876 Louisiana Gubernatorial Election. The results of the election were disputed with both Nicholls and Republican candidate Stephen B. Packard claiming victory. Nicholls garnered a majority of 8,000 votes, but the Republican-controlled State Returning Board cited irregularities and declared Packard the winner. On January 8, 1877, Packard was sworn in as Governor at St. Louis Hotel while Nicholls was sworn in as Governor at St. Patrick's Hall and for a period of several months, the state had two governors. Armed militia groups for both sides formed and in his inaugural address, Nicholls called on his supporters to remain peaceful. The day after his inauguration, Nicholls also called on the Metropolitan Police to keep the peace and previous Governor William Kellog telegraphed President Grant requesting him to deploy federal troops to New Orleans which he refused to do. As part of the Compromise of 1877 to resolve the disputed Presidential election of 1876, Republicans agreed to recognize Nicholls as the winner as part of a deal in which Democrats recognized Rutherford Hayes as President.

During his first term, he battled political corruption, which was epitomized by Samuel James, the operator of the convict lease system, state Treasurer Edward A. Burke, and Lieutenant Governor Louis A. Wiltz, who supported the corrupt Louisiana Lottery. Nicholls chaired the Louisiana Constitutional Convention of 1879 and returned the state capital from New Orleans to Baton Rouge. Nicholls was governor of Louisiana in 1891, the year when 11 Italians were lynched in New Orleans. Shortly before the incident, as thousands of angry protesters gathered near the Parish Prison, the Italian consul in New Orleans sought the governor's help. Nicholls declined to intervene.

After his tenure as governor closed, Nicholls became Chief Justice of the Louisiana Supreme Court in 1892, a post which he held until 1911. He also grew sugarcane and other crops on his Ridgefield Plantation near Thibodaux, the seat of Lafourche Parish. He died at Ridgefield. Francis and Caroline Nicholls, Thomas Clark Nicholls, and other family members are interred in St. John's Episcopal Church and Cemetery in Thibodaux.

== Memorialization ==
From 1913 to about 1950, there was a vocational school at 3649 Laurel Street in New Orleans named for Nicholls. It opened as the Francis T. Nicholls Industrial School for Girls, and offered secondary vocational training, concentrating on apparel manufacturing. The school was later renamed Nicholls Vocational School for Girls, and even later Nicholls Evening Vocational School.

In 1940, a new public high school, Francis T. Nicholls High School, was opened at 3820 St. Claude Avenue in New Orleans. In the late 1990s the high school was renamed for former slave and abolitionist leader Frederick Douglass. It is now a charter school, part of the KIPP Family Schools and known as KIPP Renaissance High School. During the 1960s, the school was integrated and black students fought to change the team names from The Rebels and the mascot from the Confederate flag to the current Bobcat.

There is a "Governor Nicholls Street" in New Orleans. Where it meets the Mississippi River near the downriver end of the French Quarter, there is a Governor Nicholls Street Wharf. Atop the wharf shed there, the United States Coast Guard built a manned control tower with a red and green traffic signal to control vessel traffic rounding Algiers Point. When speaking to the controller via marine VHF radio, mariners address him or her familiarly as "Governor Nick."

In Baton Rouge, there is a sculpture of Nicholls by Isidore Konti.

Nicholls State University, founded in 1948, is a public university located in Thibodaux, Louisiana. Nicholls is part of the University of Louisiana System. Originally called Francis T. Nicholls Junior College, the university is named for Francis T. Nicholls.

He is played by James Bearden in the 1999 HBO original film Vendetta.

== Sources ==
- Eicher, John H., and David J. Eicher, Civil War High Commands. Stanford: Stanford University Press, 2001. ISBN 978-0-8047-3641-1.
- C. Howard Nichols, Some Notes on the Military Career of Francis T. Nicholls, The Journal of the Louisiana Historical Association, Vol. 3, No. 4 (Autumn, 1962). pp. 297–315. JSTOR 4230683.
- "Francis Tillou Nicholls", A Dictionary of Louisiana Biography, Vol. 2 (1988), p. 603.
- Garnie W. McGinty, "Francis Tillou Redding Nicholls", North Louisiana History, Vol. 15, No. 1 (Winter 1984), pp. 30–39
- Sifakis, Stewart. Who Was Who in the Civil War. New York: Facts On File, 1988. ISBN 978-0-8160-1055-4.
- Warner, Ezra J. (1959). Generals in Gray: Lives of the Confederate Commanders (1st ed.). Baton Rouge: Louisiana State University Press. OCLC 445052.

Party political offices
Preceded by John McEnery	Democratic nominee for Governor of Louisiana; 1876	Succeeded by Louis A. Wiltz
Preceded by Samuel D. McEnery	Democratic nominee for Governor of Louisiana; 1888	Succeeded by Samuel D. McEnery
Political offices
Preceded by Stephen B. Packard	Governor of Louisiana; 1877–1880	Succeeded by Louis A. Wiltz
Preceded by Samuel D. McEnery	Governor of Louisiana; 1888–1892	Succeeded by Murphy J. Foster
