= Julien J. Monette =

Louisiana reconstruction era American politician

Louisiana State Senate
- In office 1868–1871

Louisiana State Senate
- In office 1877–?

Personal details
- Born: c. 1836
- Died: 1886 (aged 49–50) Panama
- Party: Republican

Julien Joseph Monette (1836–1886) was an officer during the American Civil War and a state legislator who served in the Louisiana State Senate during the Reconstruction era.

== Biography ==
His father Pierre Monette was from Haiti and his mother was Louise Boulin, they married in 1857.

Monette was a captain in the 6th Louisiana Volunteers during the American Civil War.

He was elected to the Louisiana State Senate in 1868 to the third district for Orleans and St. Bernard parishes along with T. V. Coupland. Monette received 3.284 votes with Coupland second receiving 3,277 votes.

During the 1868 session he served on the Committee on Finance and on the Committee to Ascertain the Amount of Taxes Paid by Vendors of Lottery Tickets in the City of New Orleans to the State of Louisiana. During the 1869 session he served on the Committees on Drainage Commissioners, Enrolment, and Corporations and Parochial Affairs.

He was one of fifteen Republican senators who called for the removal of James F. Casey from the position of Collector of the port of New Orleans.

In 1871 he was noted as owning $700 worth of Orleans Parish real estate. Monette was a partner in the black owned Mississippi River Packet Company along with others senators including Caesar Antoine, George Y. Kelso, Curtis Pollard, P. B. S. Pinchback and Alexander E. Barber.

Monette petitioned the court to delegitimize Edward (or Edouard) Monette as a legitimate co-heir of his father Pierre Monette's estate.

In April 1874 Monette was elected treasurer of the Radical Republican party of the eighth ward.

Monette ran for the senate again in 1876 when he nominated on the Republican ticket for the third senatorial district. He lost to P. A. Ducros Jr. but contended the result with J. Henry Burch presenting his petition to the senate in January 1877. In March 1877 the case was taken before the senate and Monette won by 16 to 3, with 17 absent, he was declared to be seated, subject to contest.

After the Reconstruction era he left Louisiana and moved to Central America. He died in Panama in 1886. He was the maternal grandfather of Jelly Roll Morton.

== See also ==
- African American officeholders from the end of the Civil War until before 1900
