= J. Henry Burch =

American politician (1836–1883)

James Henri Burch, often written as J. Henri Burch, (1836 – July 29, 1883) was an African-American state legislator in Louisiana during Reconstruction, the years after the Civil War. He represented East Baton Rouge Parish in both the state's House of Representatives and Senate and was an important Black political leader in the period.

== Early life ==
Burch was not a Louisiana native. He was born in 1836 in New Haven, Connecticut, and grew up in Hartford, the son of the Rev. Charles Burch, a successful African-American minister. He attended school at the Owego Academy in Tioga County, New York, where he was the only black student. After the Civil War, the Rev. Burch went to Louisiana to preach to the freedmen there, and his son moved to Baton Rouge in 1868. He ran a local freedmen's school until he was elected to the Louisiana House.

Along with politics, he was active in newspapers. He wrote for the Republican Standard and was co-publisher, with P. B. S. Pinchback, of the Louisianian. He later bought the Baton Rouge Courier and rebranded it as The Grand Era, publishing until 1878.

== Political career ==
He was first elected to serve in the Louisiana House in 1870 and continued in office until 1872. He was one of a number African-American state legislators who wrote to U.S. president Ulysses S. Grant requesting he declare martial law and oust Governor Henry Clay Warmoth after an 1871 fracture in the Republican Party over Warmoth's veto of a public accommodations bill. Twice in 1871, he finished second in votes to elect the speaker of the House. He was an ally of Oscar Dunn, William Pitt Kellogg, and C. C. Antoine in Republican internecine battles, and a sometimes rival of P. B. S. Pinchback.

In 1872, he was elected to the state Senate, serving until 1876. There, he criticized Democrats for not having any African-American legislators despite the state's black and white populations being of similar size. He served as chair of the Senate's penitentiary committee, where he unsuccessfully pushed a series of reforms, including a ban on the flogging of prisoners and stricter oversight of prison officials.

In 1873, he successfully proposed and passed a joint legislative resolution asking Congress to work to suppress slavery in Cuba. Burch received praise from Cuban reformers, who gave the title of "general Representative of the Republique of Cuba Abroad."

In 1876, Burch was selected to speak at the unveiling of the Emancipation Memorial in Washington, D.C., alongside such figures as Frederick Douglass, Ulysses S. Grant, and John Mercer Langston. He read the text of Abraham Lincoln's Emancipation Proclamation, "which was received with as much enthusiasm as if it had just been issued."

Also, that year, he was one of Louisiana's 8 Republican electors in the Electoral College. That election famously ended with Rutherford B. Hayes defeating Democrat Samuel Tilden by one Electoral College vote, as a result of the Compromise of 1877.

But that compromise also gave control of the Louisiana state government to Democrats, which marked the end of Reconstruction and the beginning of the end for black political power in the state.

== Personal life ==
He married Ellen Boyd Marshall in 1875. She was the widow of Louisiana lieutenant governor Oscar Dunn, the first Black statewide elected official in the United States, who had died in office four years earlier.

Burch was also well known as a musician and singer, sometimes organizing benefit concerts to help his political causes.

He died of mouth cancer on July 29, 1883.
