= 1868 Louisiana gubernatorial election =

- April 17–18, 1868
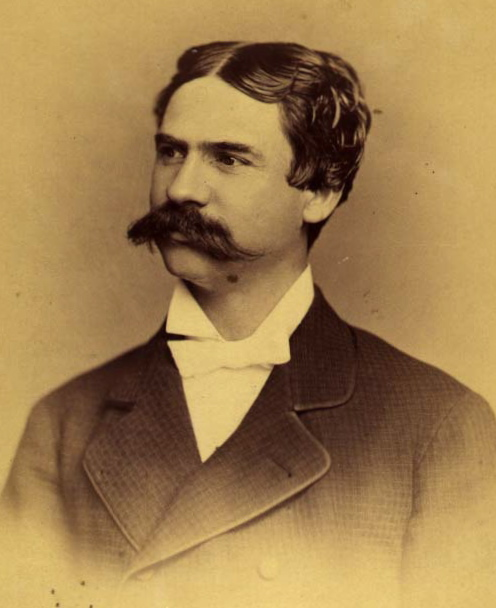

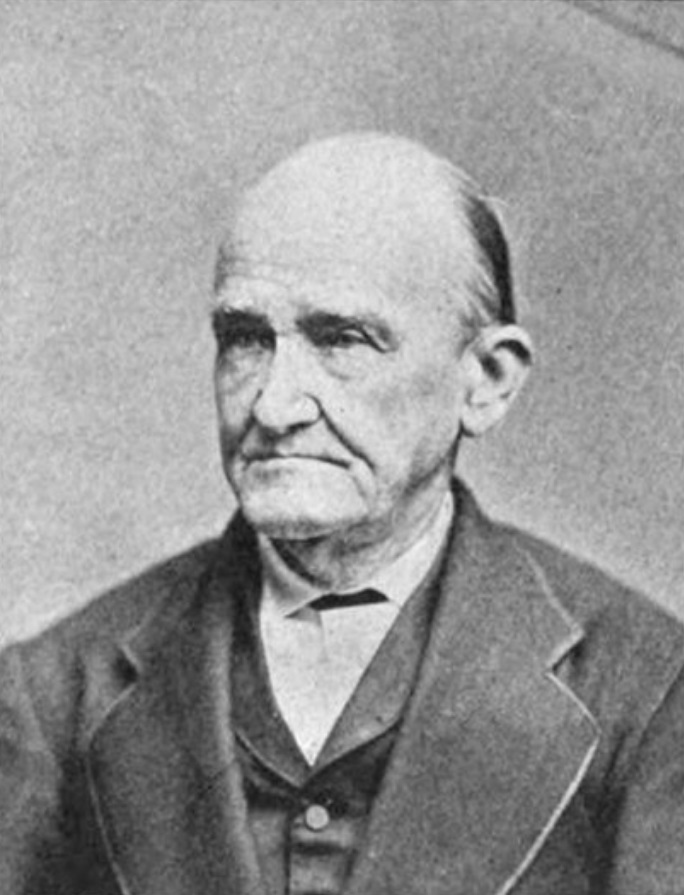
Nominee	Henry C. Warmoth	James G. Taliaferro
Party	Republican	Radical Republican
Popular vote	64,941	38,046
Percentage	63.06%	36.94%
- Election results by county Warmoth: 50–60% 60–70% 70–80% 80–90% >90% Taliaferro: 50–60% 60–70% 70–80% 80–90% >90%
Governor before election
Joshua Baker
Democratic
Elected Governor
Henry C. Warmoth
Republican

The 1868 Louisiana gubernatorial election was held over two days, April 17 and 18, the same days that voters were asked to ratify the new Louisiana Constitution of 1868, which established the civil rights of African Americans.

In the election, Henry Clay Warmoth was elected Governor of Louisiana over James G. Taliaferro. Warmoth's victory, which was defined by the factional divisions within the Republican Party, represented the triumph of white carpetbaggers over the free men of color who supported Taliaferro. Although both sides were united in their support of the Union and universal manhood suffrage, the native radicals and free men of color resented the carpetbaggers as "mere adventurers" seeking to build a political career at the expense of civil rights.

== Background ==
In 1864, during the American Civil War, Unionist voters in Union-controlled territory within Louisiana elected Michael Hahn, a moderate Republican, as civilian governor and established a new Louisiana constitution. As governor, Hahn declined to embrace universal manhood suffrage and resigned in 1865 after the legislature elected him to the United States Senate. He was succeeded by J. Madison Wells, who sought common ground with conservatives ahead of an 1865 special election, marginalizing Republicans and appointing a number of Conservative Unionists and former Confederates. These concessions earned him the unanimous endorsements of the Conservative Unionists and Democrats, the two major political parties in the state, but former Confederate governor in exile Henry Watkins Allen, who did not consent to be a candidate, received a substantial minority of the vote. Nearly all other victorious candidates in the 1865 elections were former Confederate veterans or civilian officeholders. The Republicans, consisting primarily of free men of color and Union army officers, boycotted the 1865 election in order to petition the federal government for universal manhood suffrage.

The neo-Confederate 1866 legislature soon clashed with the Unionist Wells by passing legislation over Wells's veto for elections in New Orleans and seeking to overturn the 1864 constitution. When the 1866 New Orleans mayoral election resulted in victory for ardent Confederate John T. Monroe, Wells abandoned reconciliation and joined the Republicans, who sought to reconvene the constitutional convention in order to enfranchise free men of color. The ensuing constitutional crisis culminated on July 30, 1866 in the New Orleans massacre, in which a mob of ex-Confederates rioted in an effort to disrupt the proceedings, killing 38 and wounding 146, of whom 34 dead and 119 wounded were black freedmen.

In response to the crisis in Louisiana and throughout the South, Congress passed the Reconstruction Acts over President Andrew Johnson's veto. The Acts required states to ratify the Fourteenth Amendment to the United States Constitution, which established universal manhood suffrage except "for participation in rebellion, or other crime" and establish a new constitution which received the approval of a majority of voters before readmission to the Union. Until these conditions were met, the former Confederate States were placed under martial law. U.S. Army General Phillip Sheridan, commander of the Fifth Military District, removed Wells from office and appointed radical Benjamin Flanders as governor; Flanders soon resigned after Sheridan's successor, Winfield Scott Hancock, removed Radical Republicans from office, and Flanders was succeeded by Joshua Baker, a more conservative Unionist.

=== Republican factions ===
Under the Reconstruction Acts, Republicans appeared poised to capture the South, including Louisiana, if they could only carry through the program and establish new state governments. However, conflict between two factions of the Louisiana Republicans, which historian F. Wayne Binning identified as the "compromisers" and "pure Radicals," emerged. The compromiser faction was dominated by carpetbaggers, white former Union officers who had resettled in Louisiana following the war, while the pure Radicals were led by Louis Charles Roudanez, editor of the New Orleans Tribune and a leading free man of color in the city. Roudanez first became suspicious when groups of white Radicals, organized in "Benjamin Butler clubs" which had whites-only membership, sought admission to the Republican Party.

At the Republican state convention in June 1867, the conflict between the Roudanez faction and white carpetbaggers came into the forefront, when a resolution apparently designed to give blacks a majority at the coming constitutional convention was condemned by the committee on resolutions and ultimately rejected; the ensuing debate was tinged with racial epithets and mutual recriminations between freedmen and J. Hale Sypher, a white Union officer from Ohio. Roudanez and the Tribune launched a series of criticisms of white carpetbaggers, who dominated local political in New Orleans despite a large black majority in every ward organization.

=== 1867–68 constitutional convention ===
Elections to the new constitutional convention were held on September 27 and 28, 1867. Republicans won 86 out of 98 delegate seats. As agreed at the June convention, half of the Republican delegates were black, though the Roudanez faction was led by three white allies of the Tribune, William R. Crane, Charles Smith, and Rufus Waples. As convention president, the delegates selected James G. Taliaferro, a former judge and Conservative Union candidate for lieutenant governor. Although Taliaferro had been a slaveholder and Whig before the war, Roudanez supported his election. At the secession convention, Taliaferro had been the only delegate to make a formal protest against the state's withdrawal from the Union and was respected for his integrity and manners.

At the convention, political alignments were inconsistent and sometimes unclear. Generally speaking, freedmen from the northern part of the state tended to side more often with the carpetbaggers than those from the south. If the issue was a clear-cut one over civil rights or patronage for the Tribune, free men of color would side with the radicals, but if it involved disfranchisement of whites, many free men of color would side with the compromisers. On measures not involving civil rights or disfranchisement, especially those involving financial matters, there was general cooperation. The sharpest conflicts between the factions were over political patronage, including the convention's printing patronage, qualifications for state officeholding, and the establishment of as tate board of registrars.

== Candidates ==
=== List of candidates ===
- James G. Taliaferro, president of the 1867–68 constitutional convention (Radical Republican)
- Henry Clay Warmoth, Union army officer (Republican)

==== Declined ====
- Thomas J. Durant, attorney and president of the Friends of Universal Suffrage (Radical Republican)

=== Nominations ===
During the convention, the Tribune attempted to nominate Thomas J. Durant, a leading radical, for governor. However, Durant soon came under attack from the Republican, which portrayed him as a hypocrite and grifter. A few weeks later, he announced that his candidacy had been put forward without his knowledge or consent, and the Republican dropped their attacks.

Republicans held their state convention in January 1868, during the constitutional convention, to nominate candidates for state office. On the first ballot of their convention, Francis E. Dumas, a respected man of color of the Roudanez faction and former slaveholder who had joined the Union Army, led with 41 votes, while Henry Clay Warmoth trailed close behind with 37. On the second ballot, Warmoth received the minimum 45 votes for nomination ahead of Dumas with 43. Though Dumas easily won the nomination of lieutenant governor, Roudanez prevailed upon him to decline. The Tribune claimed that Warmoth had received three fraudulent votes, more than his margin of victory. Oscar Dunn was eventually nominated as Warmoth's running mate.

Embittered by the defeat of Dumas, Roudanez moved to place an independent Republican ticket in the field. At the end of January, a letter was circulated at the constitutional convention calling for the nomination of James G. Taliaferro on a Radical Republican ticket. On January 29, Taliaferro accepted the nomination. Dumas was nominated as his running mate.

The Democratic state convention was held on March 5 in New Orleans. The Democratic Party chose not to endorse any ticket and instead bide their time for the fall presidential election. Despite their sharp differences on racial issues, most members of the Democratic Party supported Taliaferro in common cause against the carpetbaggers. The Radicals were mostly property-owning men of New Orleans, which bound them economically to the conservative white class which made up the Democratic ranks, and nominating Taliaferro was taken as a sign of moderation among the Radical ranks.

== Campaign ==
The regular Republican organization took swift action against Roudanez and the radicals. The day after Taliaferro's nomination, they replaced the Tribune with the New Orleans Republican as the official party newspaper and purged party members who had opposed Warmoth's nomination. Likewise, regular Republicans in Washington coordinated to replace the Tribune as the official federal printer in the city with the St. Landry Progress, owned by Warmoth. The bitterly antagonistic tone of the campaign continued into the spring, exposing sharp resentments between the carpetbaggers and native Unionists and radicals. One friend wrote to Taliaferro to denounce Warmoth and his supporters as "exotics seeking to troot rapidly in our soil... mere adventurers, [who] seek to build up their fortunes politically and pecuniarily upon the true people of Louisiana... they have no sympathy with the Negro, no care for his future destiny, further than they can make him a means of their own preferments." Similarly, Warmoth received a letter expressing fears that if a native Republican were elected to the senate, he would "give appointments Exclusively to old citizens, entirely disregarding the claims of the ex soldiers and the Colored man. He was an old slaveholder and they all have more or less of prejudice against us."

The campaign in the rival newspapers, the Tribune and Republican, was equally bitter. Warmoth supporters accused the Roudanez faction of attempting to destroy the Republican Party through collusion with the Democratic minority. Roudanez was accused of supporting monarchy and preferring France to the United States. Appealing to the freedmen, they accused Roudanez of preferring to join hands with the old white citizens of New Orleans over the white men from the North.

Because the election would be held under conditions of universal manhood suffrage, success depended on activating the voting power of recently freed men, and the Warmoth campaign was far more successful in organizing their vote. In at least one instance, a Warmoth organizer trailed a Taliaferro supporter throughout northern Louisiana, paying the freedmen one dollar per hundred Taliaferro tickets and distributing Warmoth tickets in their place. Although the Democratic candidates offered money "freely as water" to voters, they were unable to organize any sort of support.

== Results ==
The election was held on April 16 and 17. The constitution was ratified by a vote of 51,737 to 39,076, while Warmoth defeated Taliaferro by a margin of 64,941 to 38,046.

1868 Louisiana gubernatorial election
Party	Candidate	Votes	%
Republican	Henry C. Warmoth	64,941	63.06%
Radical Republican	James G. Taliaferro	38,046	36.94%
Total votes		102,987	100%

== Aftermath ==
Following the ratification of the 1868 constitution, Louisiana was readmitted to the Union in June, and Warmoth was inaugurated as governor the following month.

The Radical Republicans under Roudanez and Taliaferro disappeared from Louisiana politics after their defeat in 1868, though Warmoth did appoint Taliaferro to the Louisiana Supreme Court. Roudanez retired from politics entirely, with the Tribune ceasing publication on April 27 with only brief appearances afterward. Many free men of color who had supported Warmoth in 1868 soon became disillusioned with his record on civil rights, and, led by Lieutenant Governor Oscar Dunn, joined the opposition to the Warmoth administration.

Warmoth's administration was overshadowed by the rise of paramilitary or terrorist organizations opposed to the Reconstruction Acts, led by the Knights of the White Camelia and followed by the Ku Klux Klan out of Tennessee. Extrajudicial terrorism against Republicans resulted in the return of the Democratic Party in Louisiana, and Democratic nominee Horatio Seymour carried the fall 1868 presidential election over Ulysses S. Grant by a landslide margin.

Preceded by 1865 Louisiana gubernatorial election	Louisiana gubernatorial elections	Succeeded by 1872 Louisiana gubernatorial election
