= 1872 Louisiana gubernatorial election =

- November 4, 1872
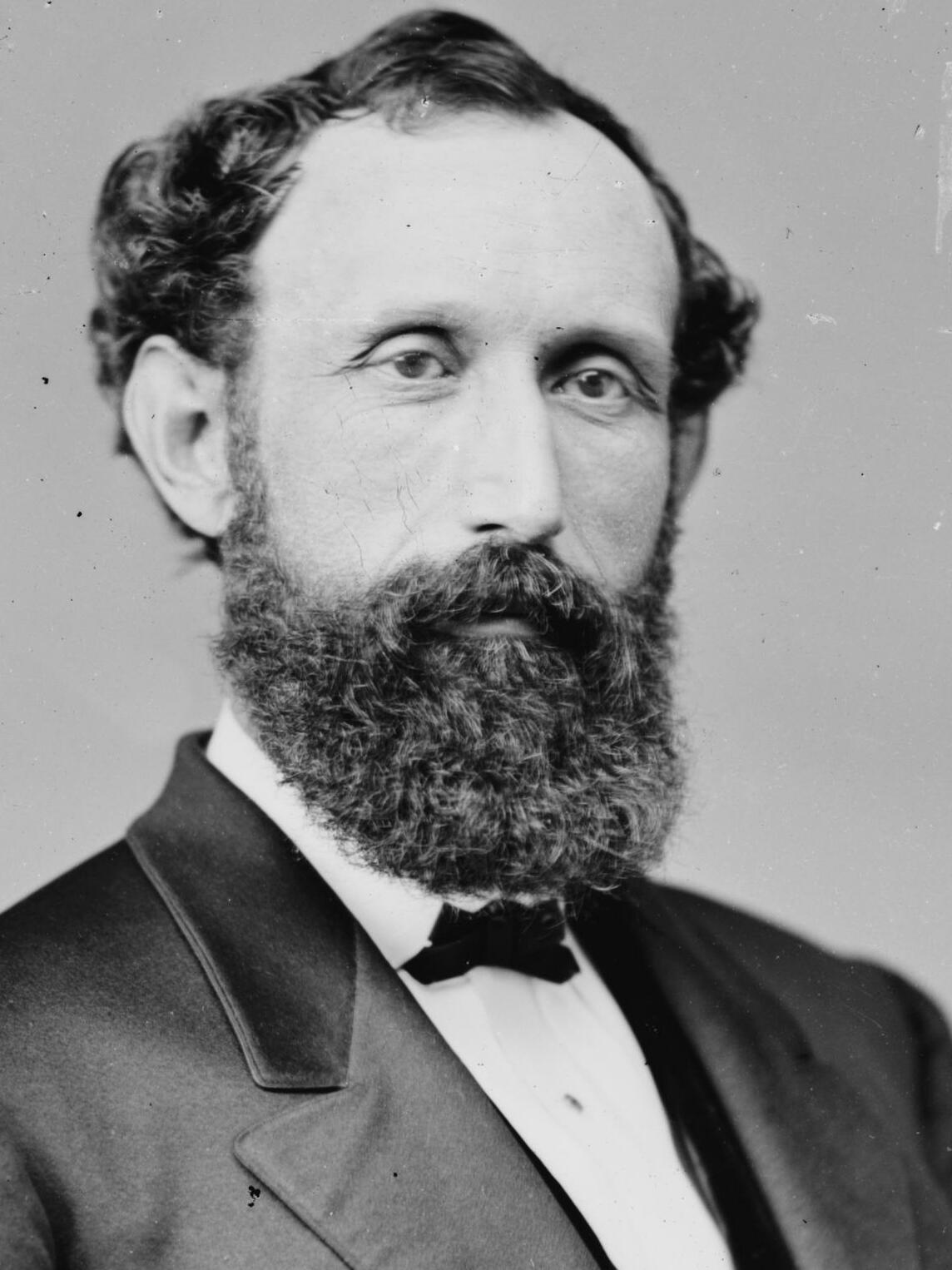

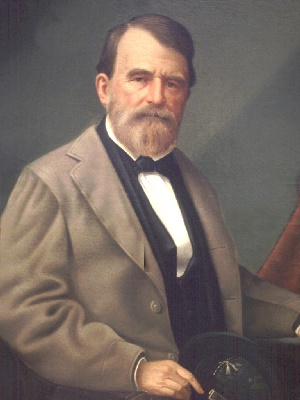
Nominee	William Pitt Kellogg	John McEnery
Party	Republican	Democratic
Alliance		Liberal Republican
Popular vote	72,890	55,249
Percentage	56.88%	43.12%
- Election results by parish Kellogg: 50–60% 60–70% 70–80% 80–90% 90–100% McEnery: 50–60% 60–70% 70–80% 80–90% 90–100%
Governor before election
P. B. S. Pinchback
Republican
Elected Governor
William Pitt Kellogg
Republican

The 1872 Louisiana gubernatorial election was held on November 4, 1872. This was the second election to take place under the Louisiana Constitution of 1868, which established universal manhood suffrage in Louisiana as required by the Reconstruction Acts. The campaign was marred by terrorist and paramilitary action in support of the Democratic Party. Democratic candidate John McEnery disputed the official results, which declared William Pitt Kellogg the winner, but Kellogg's claim was supported by President of the United States Ulysses S. Grant. The Democratic Party sought the overthrow of the Kellogg administration, culminating in the Battle of Liberty Place in 1874, where the White League forced Kellogg from office until he was reinstated by federal troops.

This was the last time a Republican won the governorship in Louisiana until 1979.

== Background ==
Following the end of the American Civil War and assassination of Abraham Lincoln, President Andrew Johnson pursued a lenient policy of Reconstruction in the Southern United States, recognizing Unionist governments in the South pursuant to Lincoln's ten percent plan over the objections of radical Republicans in Congress. Following the 1866 midterm elections, which resulted in sweeping radical gains, Congress passed the Reconstruction Acts over Johnson's veto.

Under the Reconstruction Acts, Southern governments would only be recognized if they ratified the Fourteenth Amendment to the United States Constitution and enact a new state constitution approved by Congress.

Louisiana enacted a new constitution in April 1868 in an election largely boycotted by the Democratic Party and former Confederates. Henry C. Warmoth, a young Union Army officer from Missouri, was simultaneously elected Governor under conditions of universal manhood suffrage. Warmoth's victory over James G. Taliaferro represented the victory of the "carpetbagger" faction of the Republican Party over the faction of native radicals and free men of color. Despite their abstention from the April election, the former Confederates organized in several paramilitary organizations to resist the Reconstruction Acts, terrorizing Republicans, especially freedmen, during the fall presidential campaign. In a surprising reversal attributed to domestic terrorism and voter intimidation, Democratic candidate Horatio Seymour won the state over Ulysses S. Grant in a landslide.

== Candidates ==
- William Pitt Kellogg, United States Senator since 1868 (Republican)
- John McEnery, former Confederate States Army officer (Democratic and Liberal Republican)

== Results ==
1872 Louisiana gubernatorial election
Party	Candidate	Votes	%	±%
Republican	William Pitt Kellogg	72,890	56.88%	▼5.63
Democratic	John McEnery	55,249	43.12%	▲5.63
Total votes		128,139	100.00%	

Preceded by 1868 Louisiana gubernatorial election	Louisiana gubernatorial elections	Succeeded by 1876 Louisiana gubernatorial election
