= Robert F. Guichard =

American politician

Robert F. Guichard was a clerk of the Louisiana House of Representatives, a state legislator, and a public official in Louisiana. He was a Republican.

He represented St. Bernard Parish in the Louisiana House of Representatives from 1872 to 1874 and in the Louisiana Senate from 1884 to 1892.

He signed an appeal to Governor William Pitt Kellogg in 1875.

Guichard served as a parish superintendent of education.

Leopold Guichard was a representative of Saint Bernard Parish at the 1868 Louisiana Constitutional Convention.
