= Governor McEnery =

Governor McEnery may refer to:

- John McEnery (Louisiana politician) (1833–1891), 25th Governor of Louisiana
- Samuel D. McEnery (1837–1910), 30th Governor of Louisiana
