= Alexander E. Barber =

Louisiana soldier and politician

Alexander E. Barber (b. 1829/30 – October 24, 1875) was an American soldier, newspaper editor and state legislator serving in the Louisiana State Senate from 1870 to 1874.

== Biography ==
He was born enslaved around 1829 to 1830 and was working on the Mississippi River steamboats while still a child.

Around 1850 he was owned by Pierce Barber who ran a hat shop on Fourth and Main Street, New Orleans and Aleck, as he was known, worked as a porter. He was sold to someone else a few years later and back working on the Mississippi River.

Before the start of the American Civil War Aleck had saved enough to buy his freedom. During the war he served in the Union Army and achieved the rank of officer. He continued to live in New Orleans and by the end of the war was known as Alexander E. Barber although when he adopted this name is unclear.

At the New Orleans convention on black suffrage held in January 1865 he served as the vice president. He was also the founder of the New Orleans Black Republicans organization later the same year.

Barber was joint owner of the New Orleans Louisianian that was founded by fellow senator P. B. S. Pinchback. He also started the unsuccessful Mississippi River Packet Company and in the 1870 census was listed as owning $750 of personal property.

He was elected to the Louisiana State Senate and served from 1870 to 1874. Barber was said to have an agreeable personality and a strong character and Frederick Douglass said after a meeting with him that the South had "capable native leaders".

Governor Henry Clay Warmoth appointed Barber to be the New Orleans harbormaster as well as making him a brigadier general in the state militia.

In 1874 Barber and Bradford B. Davis sued the Louisiana Jockey Club for refusing to sell them quarter stretch badges based on being colored in violation of their constitutional rights and state laws.

== Death ==
The brigadier general died October 24, 1875, and the officers and soldiers of his command paid tribute to him two days later. It was said that he died as a well respected citizen. When he was laid out for viewing before burial a rumor started that he was not yet dead and had signs of life, the press was told and visited but did not concur and although two doctors were called neither examined the body leading to the belief by some that he was buried alive. He was buried at Bienville Street Cemetery after being escorted from his home by several platoons of the militia and many other friends and neighbors.

== See also ==
- African American officeholders from the end of the Civil War until before 1900
