= Louisiana Levee Company =

The Louisiana Levee Company was a public-private company chartered by Louisiana's Reconstruction Era government in 1871. It held a statewide monopoly on all contracts dealing with levee construction, maintenance, and repair. Though it initially was granted a 21-year contract, its operations were terminated by the state in 1876. Despite its shortened existence and notorious corruption, the company left a significant legacy in Louisiana and beyond in areas as diverse as prison labor, constitutional law, and a body of corporate litigation precedent.

== History ==
At the end of the American Civil War, Louisiana's levee system was in ruins. Hundreds of miles of levees had been destroyed along the course of the lower Mississippi River and throughout the Atchafalaya Basin. These systems of flood-control and mitigation structures were raised during the decades preceding the war, largely through the use of marginal slave labor from the state's plantation economy.

Severe flooding impacted agriculture and redevelopment throughout South Louisiana in the wake of the war, and despite the issuance of four million dollars in bonds to alleviate these straits, in 1868 the state legislature determined that little, if anything, had actually been done. The 1871 act establishing the Levee Company passed the legislature in part through open bribing of representatives by Governor Henry C. Warmoth.

== Repeal & Legacy ==
The Louisiana Levee Company Act was repealed by the state in 1876 and its duties devolved to individual levee boards.

The Levee Company did succeed in alleviating some flooding through the executions of its contracts. S.L. James (see Angola), who held another 21-year lease, this one for a monopoly on convict labor at the state level, employed his charges in many of these contracts. The company's activities were challenged in court in cases dealing with corporate personhood and constitutional law. Precedent from these cases reached as far away as Michigan and Washington state. The complex challenges of this litigation even impacted sections of the Louisiana Constitution of 1879 which were necessary to not only deal with the problems brought on by years of litigation, but also to guarantee obligations incurred by state guarantees of company bonds.
