= Moses Sterrett =

Moses Sterrett was a politician and community leader in Louisiana. Described as "mulatto", he served as president of the Caddo Parish Republican Club. He served in the Louisiana House of Representatives from 1868 to 1870. He later worked as a janitor in the Caddo Parish courthouse.

He organized "colored" nurses under the Howard Association in 1873.

A steward, he represented Caddo Parish for one term in the Louisiana House of Representatives. He and state senator C. C. Antoine sponsored a bill to give the mayor of Shreveport additional powers. They also promoted a bill to establish a charity hospital in Shreveport. In the House he served on the Public Printing Committee and on a committee for the equal distribution of rooms in the State House.

Governor H. C. Warmoth appointed him administrator of assessments at Shreveport in 1872.

He was part of the Republican State Convention held at Turner Hall in New Orleans August 9 and 10, 1861. He and various other Republican delegates signed a letter protesting actions by the State Central Committee. The convention was documented as a "bolters' convention". In 1892, he was a delegate to the Tenth Republican National Convention held in Minneapolis, Minnesota.

== See also ==
- African American officeholders from the end of the Civil War until before 1900
