= Samuel Armstead =

American politician, minister, restaurateur (c. 1804–1908)

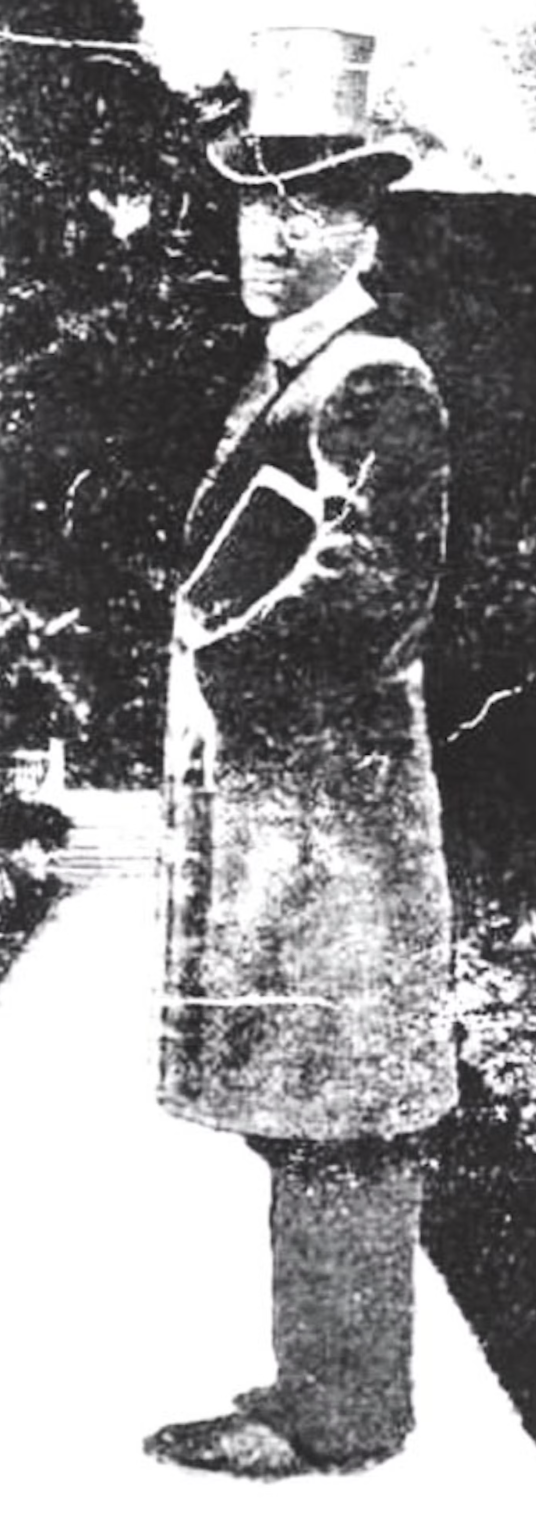
- Samuel Armstead (c. 1871)

Louisiana House of Representatives, 1st District
- In office 1870–1871

Secretary of State of Louisiana
- In office 1873–1873

Personal details
- Born: Samuel Ball c. 1804 West Virginia, U.S.
- Died: October 4, 1908 Shreveport, Caddo Parish, Louisiana, U.S.
- Resting place: Star Cemetery, Shreveport, Caddo Parish, Louisiana, U.S.
- Party: Republican and Democrat
- Spouse(s): Catherine Armstead (m. ?–1891; her death), Ann Brown (m. 1893–1908; death)
- Occupation: Politician, Methodist minister, restaurateur

Samuel Armstead (né Samuel Ball; c. 1804–October 4, 1908) was an American politician, Methodist minister, restaurateur, and was formerly enslaved. An African American, he served in the Louisiana House of Representatives, established a church, and started a school in Caddo Parish, Louisiana. He was also known as Joseph Samuel Armstead, and Sam Armstead.

== Life and career ==
Samuel Armstead was born as Samuel Ball in c. 1804, in West Virginia. He was African American and at the time of his birth he was enslaved by Dr. William Ball. He learned to read and write early in life, which was unusual for enslaved people. In 1858, Armstead was brought to Shreveport, Louisiana by Ball. He worked as a minister for slaves at the First Methodist Episcopal Church (now the First Methodist Church) in Shreveport, Louisiana.

After the American Civil War ended in 1865, he changed his name to Joseph Samuel Armstead. He founded the St. Paul African Methodist Episcopal Zion Church (now the St. Paul United Methodist Church) in 1865, and led some 90 formerly enslaved parishioners that had attended his sermons the First Methodist Episcopal Church. That same year he also founded the St. Paul Christian School of the Bottoms, also known as Christian Bottom School, which was the first African American school for children and illiterate adults in Shreveport.

Armstead was elected in 1870 to the Louisiana House of Representatives representing Caddo Parish in the 1st district, where he remained for one year. In the 1870s it was not uncommon for African Americans to hold elected office in Louisiana.

He was elected as Secretary of State of Louisiana in 1872, under the Democratic John McEnery ticket, and served the following year under Republican Gov. P. B. S. Pinchback. Armstead was forced from his office sometime in 1873.

He died on October 4, 1908, in his home in Shreveport.

== Personal life ==
Armstead married twice. His first wife, Catherine Armstead (c. 1820–1891), worked as a cook at the family restaurant. They had children, but its unclear how many.

His second wife, Ann Brown, was some 40 years his junior. They married in 1893. They lived at 101 Louisiana Street in Shreveport.

== See also ==
- Francis E. Dumas
