= Samuel Ball =

Samuel Ball may refer to:

- Samuel Ball (educator) (1935–2009), Australian educator
- Samuel George Ball (1884–1969), Australian rugby league administrator
- Sam Ball (1944–2023), American football player
- Sam Ball (filmmaker), American documentary film producer
- Samuel Armstead (c. 1804–1908), born as Samuel Ball, American politician, minister, and restaurateur

== See also ==
- Samuel Ball Platner (1863–1921) American archaeologist
