= Henderson Williams =

Louisiana state representative

Henderson Williams was a state legislator in Louisiana who served in the Louisiana House of Representatives for Madison Parish. He was first elected in 1868, and again to serve in the 1870-1872 session. Henderson was one of the African-American legislators who appealed to U.S. president Ulysses S. Grant in a January 9, 1872 letter to intervene in a dispute with fellow Republican governor Henry C. Warmoth.

February 10, 1872, he and other African-American legislators signed a letter in support of Warmoth. He also co-signed a letter calling for the removal of James F. Casey as collector of the Port of New Orleans.

In 1869, Williams and Curtis Pollard were authorized to operate a ferry in Madison Parish.

He died August 1874.
