= Felix C. Antoine =

Louisiana state legislator

Felix Antoine

Member of the Louisiana House of Representatives
- In office 1868–1872

Personal details
- Born: 1839 New Orleans, Louisiana, U.S.
- Died: 1917 (aged 77–78)
- Party: Republican

Felix C. Antoine (c. 1839 – 1917) was a Louisiana state legislator during the Reconstruction era. During the Civil War, he served as a second lieutenant in the 7th Louisiana Regiment Infantry in the Union Army. He served in the Louisiana House of Representatives from 1868 to 1872. A Republican, he also served as harbor master in New Orleans and was a night inspector at its customs house.

He was born in New Orleans. He was the younger brother of Caeser Antoine who served in the Louisiana Senate and as Lieutenant Governor of Louisiana.
