= Oscar Dunn =

American politician (1822–1871)

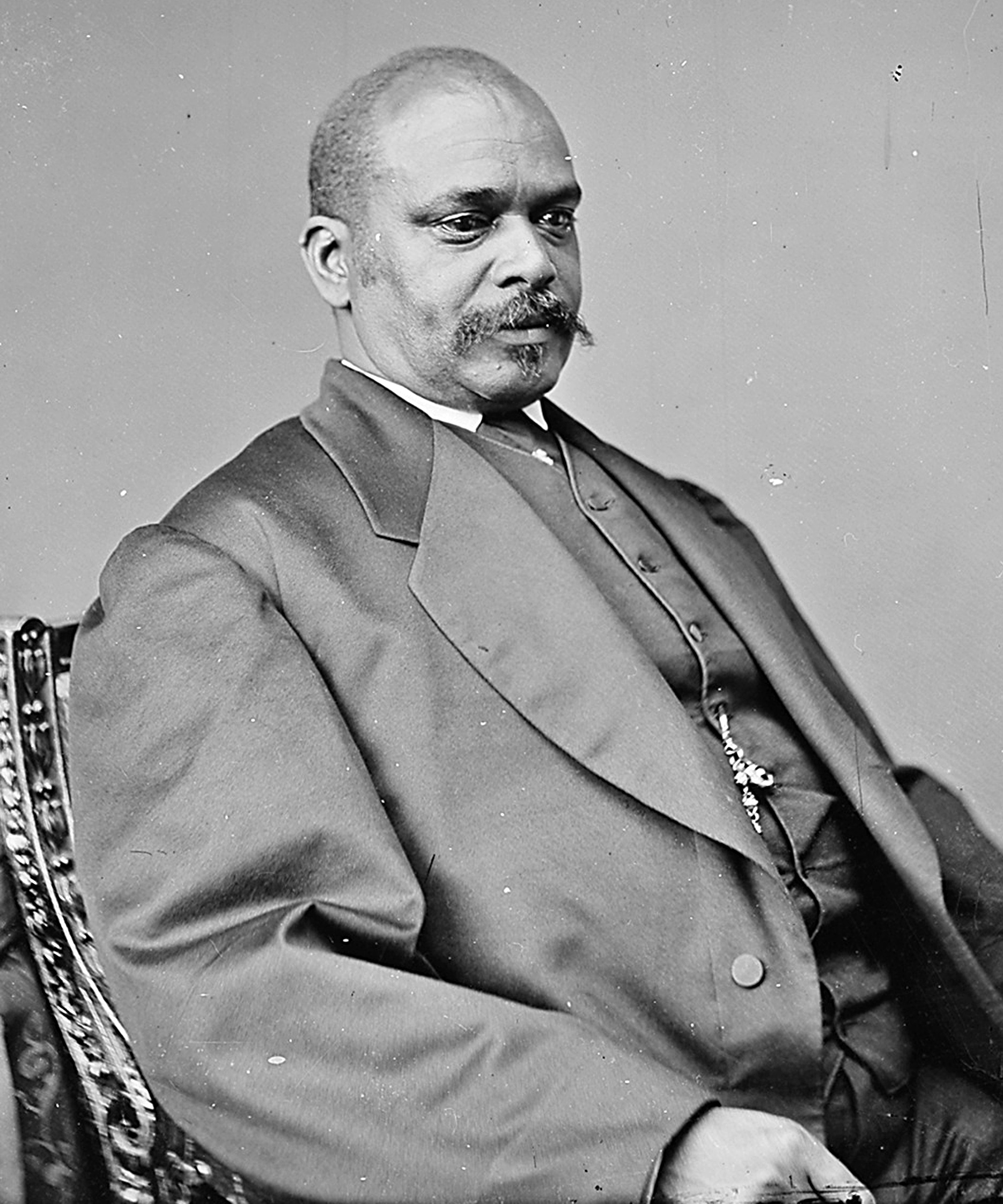

11th Lieutenant Governor of Louisiana
- In office June 27, 1868 – November 22, 1871
- Governor: Henry C. Warmoth
- Preceded by: Albert Voorhies
- Succeeded by: P. B. S. Pinchback

Personal details
- Born: Oscar James Dunn; 1822 New Orleans, Louisiana, U.S.
- Died: November 22, 1871 (aged 48–49) New Orleans, Louisiana, U.S.
- Resting place: St. Louis Cemetery No. 2 in New Orleans
- Party: Republican
- Spouse: Ellen Boyd Marchand
- Children: 3 (adopted)
- Occupation: Musician; businessman

Oscar James Dunn (1822 – November 22, 1871) served as the 11th lieutenant governor of Louisiana during the era of Reconstruction and was the first African American to serve as lieutenant governor of a U.S. state. He was also the first African-American to serve as acting governor of a U.S. state.

In 1868, Dunn was elected lieutenant governor of Louisiana, thus becoming the first African-American lieutenant governor of a U.S. state. He ran on the ticket headed by Henry Clay Warmoth, formerly of Illinois. In 1871, he became the first first African-American acting governor of a U.S. state after Governor Warmoth injured his foot and left Louisiana to recuperate on two occasions. Article 53 of the Louisiana Constitution of 1868 required the lieutenant governor to serve as acting governor "in case of impeachment of the Governor, his removal from office, death...resignation or absence from the state." Dunn served as acting governor of Louisiana for a total of 39 days. Dunn died in office, and the state legislature elected state Senator P. B. S. Pinchback, another African American Republican, to replace him as lieutenant governor. A year later, Pinchback became acting governor for his own 34-day interim stint.

== Early life ==
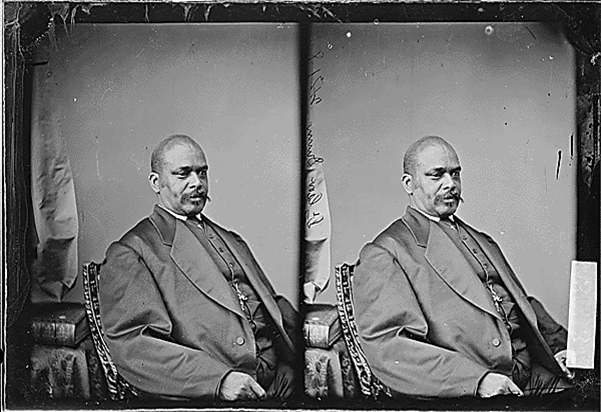
Oscar James Dunn, Lieutenant Governor of Louisiana 1868–1871, National Archive Mathew Brady Collection

In approximately 1822, Dunn was born into slavery in New Orleans. His mother, Maria Dunn, was enslaved under the law of the time. He received her status and was also enslaved. His father, James Dunn, had been freed in 1819 by his owner. James Dunn was born into slavery in Petersburg, Virginia, and had been transported to the Deep South during the forced migration of more than one million African Americans from the Upper South. He was bought by James H. Caldwell of New Orleans, who founded the St. Charles Theatre and New Orleans Gas Light Company. Dunn worked for Caldwell as a skilled carpenter for decades, including after his emancipation by Caldwell in 1819.

After being emancipated, Dunn married Maria, then enslaved, and they had two children, Oscar and Jane. Slave marriages were not recognized under the law. By 1832, Dunn had earned enough money as a carpenter to purchase the freedom of his wife and both children. Their status as free blacks was gained decades before the American Civil War. As English speakers, they were not, however, part of the culture of free people of color in Louisiana, who were primarily of French descent and culture and of the Catholic religion.

James Dunn continued to work as a carpenter for his former master Caldwell. His wife, Maria Dunn, ran a boarding house for actors and actresses who were in the city to perform at the Caldwell theatres. Together, they were able to pay for education for their children. Having studied music, Dunn became both an accomplished musician and an instructor of the violin.

Oscar Dunn was apprenticed as a young man to a plastering and painting contractor, A. G. Wilson. Wilson verified Dunn's free status in the Mayor's Register of Free People of Color 1840–1864. On November 23, 1841, the contractor reported Dunn as a runaway in a newspaper ad in the New Orleans Times-Picayune. However, Dunn must have returned to work because he progressed in the world.

Dunn was an English-speaking free black in a city in which the racial caste system was the underpinning of daily life. Ethnic French, including many free people of color, believed their culture was more subtle and flexible than that brought by the English-speaking residents, who came to the city in the early-to-mid-19th century after the Louisiana Purchase and began to dominate it in number. Free people of color had been established as a separate class of merchants, artisans and property owners, many of whom had educations. However, American migrants from the South dismissed their special status, classifying society in binary terms, as black or white, despite a long history of interracial relations in their own history.

=== Freemasonry ===
Dunn joined Prince Hall Richmond Lodge #4, one of a number of fraternal organizations that expanded to New Orleans, out of the Prince Hall Ohio Lodge during the 19th century. In the latter half of the 1850s, he rose to Master and Grand Master of the Eureka Grand Lodge which became the Louisiana Grand Lodge [Prince Hall/York Rite]. Author and historian, Joseph A. Walkes Jr., a Prince Hall Freemason, credits Dunn with outstanding conduct of Masonic affairs in Louisiana. As a Freemason, Dunn developed his leadership skills, and he established a wide network and power base in the black community that was essential for his later political career.

=== Marriage and family ===
In December 1866, Dunn married Ellen Boyd Marchand, a widow born free in Ohio. She was the daughter of Henry Boyd and his wife, who were from Ohio. He adopted her three children, Fannie (9), Charles (7) and Emma (5). The couple did not have children together. In 1870, the Dunn family residence was on Canal Street, one block west of South Claiborne Avenue and within walking distance of Straight University and the St. James A.M.E. Church complex, where they were members.

== Reconstruction era and politics ==
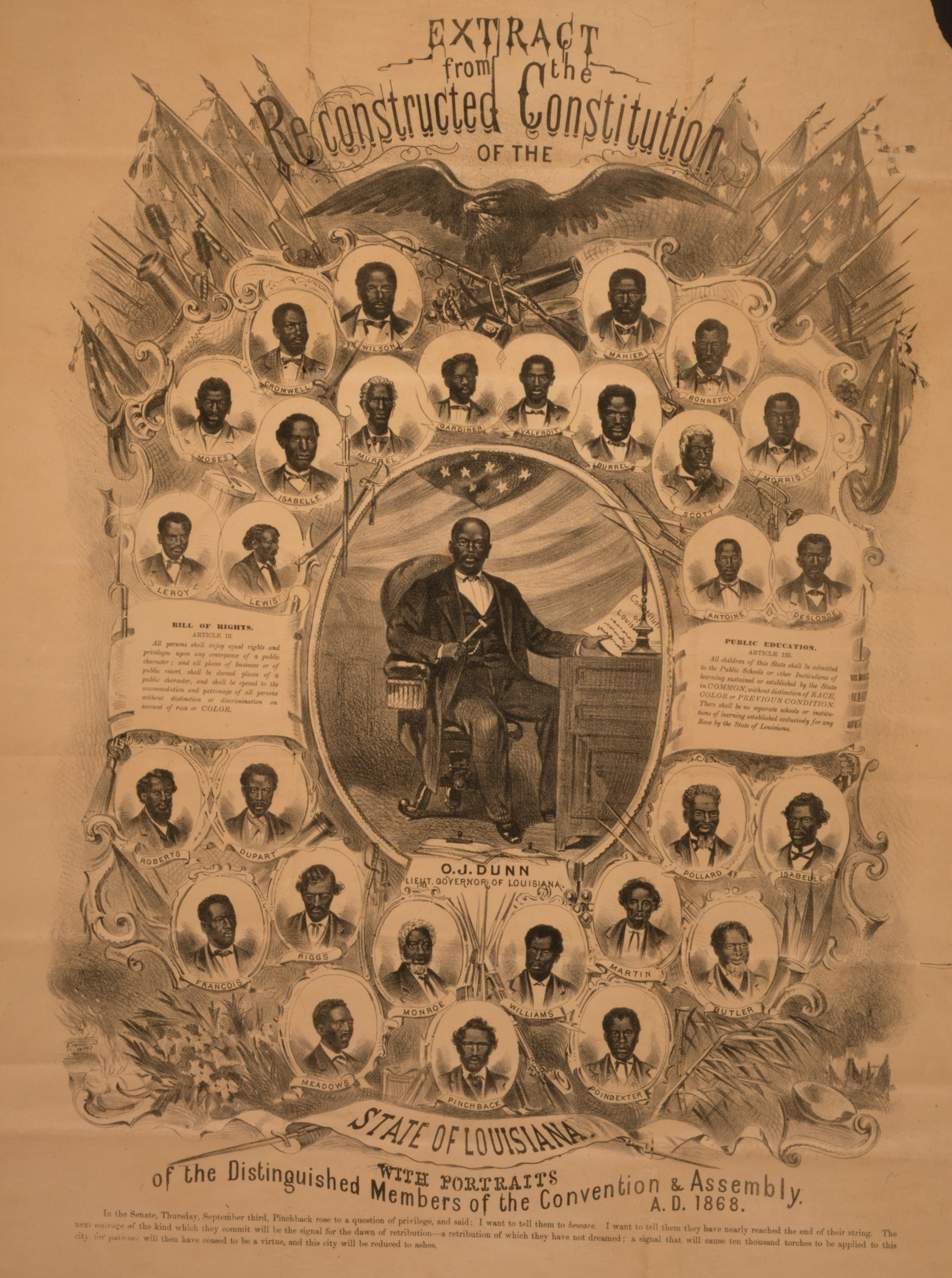
Portraits of African-American delegates to the Louisiana Constitutional Convention, 1868. Dunn, in the center, is pictured seated at his desk.

Dunn worked to achieve equality for the millions of blacks freed by passage of the Thirteenth Amendment, ratified after the American Civil War. He actively promoted and supported the Universal Suffrage Movement, advocated land ownership for all blacks, taxpayer-funded education of all black children, and equal protection of the laws under the Fourteenth Amendment. He joined the Republican Party, many of whose members supported suffrage for blacks.

Dunn opened an employment agency that assisted in finding jobs for the freedmen. He was appointed as Secretary of the Advisory Committee of the Freedmen's Savings and Trust Company of New Orleans, established by the Freedmen's Bureau. As the city and region struggled to convert to a free labor system, Dunn worked to ensure that recently freed slaves were treated fairly by former planters, who insisted on hiring by year-long contracts. In 1866, he organized the People's Bakery, an enterprise owned and operated by the Louisiana Association of Workingmen.

Elected to the New Orleans city council in 1867, Dunn was named chairman of a committee to review Article 5 of the City Charter. He proposed that "all children between the ages of 6–18 be eligible to attend public schools and that the Board of Aldermen shall provide for the education of all children ... without distinction to color." In the state Constitutional Convention of 1867–1868, the resolution was enacted into Louisiana law and laid the foundation for the public education system, established for the first time in the state by the biracial legislature. Dunn's biographer (and descendant) Brian K. Mitchell observed in a Chicago Tribune interview, "The reason he wanted to integrate schools is he believed that it's hard to change adults' minds, but if we have children growing up experiencing each other, we can erode racism in this country."

Dunn was very active in local, state and federal politics, with connections to U.S. President Ulysses S. Grant and U.S. Senator Charles Sumner of Massachusetts. Long before President Theodore Roosevelt invited Booker T. Washington, President Grant met him at the White House on April 2, 1869.

Running for lieutenant governor, he defeated a white candidate—W. Jasper Blackburn, the former mayor of Minden in Webster Parish—for the nomination by a vote of 54 to 27. The Warmoth–Dunn Republican ticket was elected, 64,941 to 38,046: That was considered the rise of the Radical Republican influence in state politics. Dunn was inaugurated lieutenant governor on June 13, 1868. He was also the President pro tempore of the Louisiana State Senate. He was a member of the Printing Committee of the legislature, which controlled a million-dollar budget. He also served as President of the Metropolitan Police, which had an annual budget of nearly one million dollars. It struggled to maintain peace in a volatile political atmosphere, especially after the New Orleans Riot of 1866. In 1870, Dunn served on the board of trustees and Examining Committee for Straight University, a historically black college founded in the city.

The Republicans developed severe internal conflicts. Although elected with Warmoth, as the governor worked toward Fusionist goals, Dunn became allied with the Custom House faction, which was led by Stephen B. Packard and tied in with federal patronage jobs. They had differences with the Warmoth-Pinchback faction, and challenged it for leadership of the party. Warmoth had been criticized for appointing white Democrats to state positions, encouraging alliances with Democrats, and his failure to advance civil rights for blacks. William Pitt Kellogg, whom Warmoth had helped gain election as U.S. Senator in 1868, also allied with Packard and was later elected as governor of the state.

Because of Dunn's wide connections and influence in the city, his defection to the Custom House faction meant that he would take many Republican ward clubs with him in switching allegiance, especially those made up of African Americans rather than Afro-Creoles (the mixed-race elite that had been established as free before the war). For the Radical Republicans, the city was always more important to their political power than were the rural parishes.

Dunn made numerous political enemies during this period. According to The New York Times, Dunn "had difficulties with Harry Lott", a Rapides Parish member of the Louisiana House of Representatives (1868–1870, 1870–1872). He also had differences with his eventual successor as lieutenant governor, State Senator P.B.S. Pinchback over policy, leadership, and direction.

=== Acting Governor of Louisiana ===
Dunn assumed the office of acting governor of Louisiana for a total of 39 days during the period between May 5, 1871, and July 18, 1871, after Warmoth sustained an injury to his foot that required two extended absences from the state, thus making Dunn the first African-American serving as governor in the history of the United States. As acting governor, Dunn weighed in on a number of serious matters, including a petition from four European consuls to commute the sentences of two Spanish nationals scheduled for execution. Nearing the end of his recovery in Pass Christian, Mississippi, Warmoth sent his secretary to New Orleans to lock Dunn out of the governor's office after disagreement over executive actions. Warmoth soon thereafter return to the city and his office.

=== Death ===
On November 22, 1871, Dunn died at home, at age 49, after a brief and sudden illness. He had been campaigning for the upcoming state and presidential elections. There was speculation that he was poisoned by political enemies, but no evidence was found. According to Nick Weldon at the Historic New Orleans Collection, Dunn's symptoms were consistent with arsenic poisoning: vomiting and shivering. Only four out of the seven doctors who examined Dunn signed off on the official cause of death, suspecting murder. No confirmation was made because Dunn's family had refused an autopsy.

The Dunn funeral was reported as one of the largest in New Orleans. As many as 50,000 people lined Canal Street for the procession, and newspapers across the nation reported the event. State officials, Masonic lodges and civic and social organizations participated in the procession from the St. James A.M.E. church to his grave site. He was interred in the Cassanave family mausoleum at St. Louis Cemetery No. 2.

== Honors ==
W.E.B. Du Bois, leading civil rights activist, later called Dunn "an unselfish, incorruptible leader."

The Washington Artillery Park in New Orleans was renamed in honor of Oscar Dunn.

The New Orleans Times-Picayune published a poem the day after Dunn's death in his honor, entitled The Death Struggle:

My back is to the wall
And my face is to my foes;
I've lived a life of combat,
And borne what no one knows.
But in this mortal struggle
I stand—poor speck of dust,
Defiant—self-reliant,
To die—if die I must.

== Survivors ==
After his death, his widow, Ellen, was appointed by the mayor of New Orleans to the position of municipal archives director. Several years later, on November 23, 1875, she married J. Henri Burch. A former state senator from East Baton Rouge Parish, Burch had been an ally of her late husband's, as part of the Custom House faction. The Burch family resided in New Orleans and continued there after the withdrawal of federal troops and the end of Reconstruction, in 1877.

== See also ==
- List of African-American firsts
- List of minority governors and lieutenant governors in the United States

== Notes ==
Political offices
Preceded by Albert Voorhies	Lieutenant Governor of Louisiana; 1868–1871	Succeeded by P. B. S. Pinchback
