= Theophile T. Allain =

Member of the Louisiana State Legislature in the 1870s and 1880s

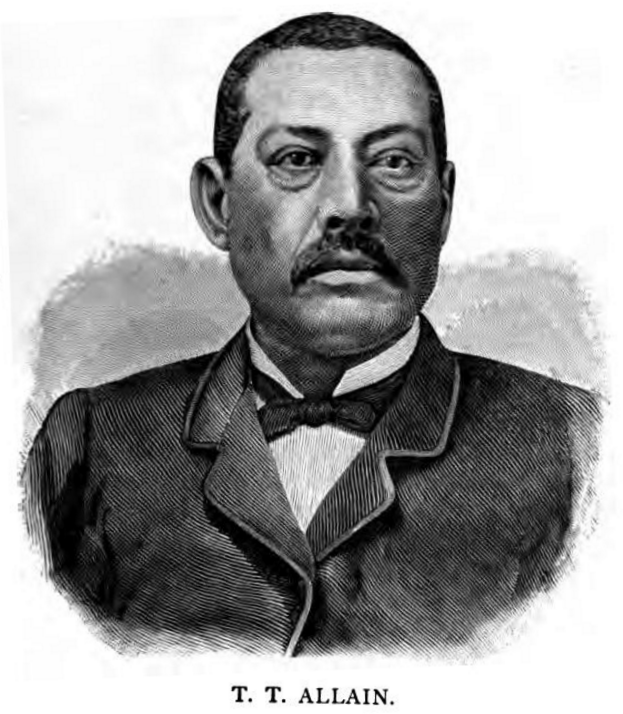

Member of the Louisiana House of Representatives from District 14
- In office 1872–1874

Member of the Louisiana Senate from District 14
- In office 1875–1878

Member of the Louisiana House of Representatives from District 14
- In office 1879–1886

Personal details
- Born: October 1, 1846 West Baton Rouge Parish, Louisiana, U.S.
- Died: February 2, 1917 (aged 70) Chicago, Illinois, U.S.
- Party: Republican
- Occupation: Politician

Theophile T. Allain (October 1, 1846 – February 2, 1917) was a member of the Louisiana State Legislature in the 1870s and 1880s. His politics focused on education and development and he was instrumental in the updating of Mississippi River levees in the 1880s. Later in his life he moved to Chicago and he remained active in civil rights. He was, for a time, the wealthiest black person in Louisiana.

== Early life ==
Theophile Terrence Allain was born a slave on October 1, 1846 on the Australian Plantation, West Baton Rouge Parish, Louisiana. His father was a wealthy plantation owner named Sosthene Allain and was owner of Theophile and his mother. Allain served as valet and body-servant of his master. Sosthene was affectionate to the youth, allowing Theophile to eat at his table and taking Theophile to Europe. When Allain was ten, he traveled to Paris with his father where he attended school. Allain occasionally went by the nickname "Soulouque". At one point in the 1850s, Allain was travelling to France to meet his master. Crowds gathered at the port to meet him, believing him to be the Haitian leader, Faustin Soulouque. In 1859, back in Louisiana, he entered school again, and in 1868 he attended a private school in New Brunswick, New Jersey. In 1869 he entered the grocery business in West Baton Rouge and Iberville, where he remained until 1873. He next invested in sugar and rice cultivation and became owner of his father's plantation. He also was successful in the shipping industry, particularly with sugar, syrup, molasses, and rice.

== Louisiana politics ==
Working closely with P. B. S. Pinchback, Allain entered politics in 1872. Allain was elected to the Louisiana House of Representatives from 1872 to 1874 and from 1879 to 1886. He was a member of the state Senate from 1875 to 1878. As a legislator, he represented the 14th district. In 1879, he was a member of the constitutional convention. As a Republican legislator, he advocated for the interests of farm labor, especially black labor, stating "that labor and capital are mutually dependent upon each other". He also pushed to repair and build levees on the Mississippi, which he framed as a measure to protect the laborer as well as an important factor in economic prosperity along the Mississippi River. He was frequently associated with educational causes and with Booker T. Washington. In 1886, he secured $14,000 in a bill for the foundation of Southern University, and along with Pinchback and Henry Demas is considered a founder of that University. He was the first person after the US Civil War to organize integrated public schools in Baton Rouge.

In 1880, Allain, along with representative Zachary Taylor Young, led the opposition to a bill to modify Article 527 of the state constitution. This Article required unanimity in jury verdicts, and the modification of the bill would require only nine jurors to agree, which would make criminal convictions easier for prosecutors and would increase the number of black convicts. The amendment was led by representatives Henry Heidenhain and John S. Billiu and critics of the bill saw it as an effort to re-enslave Louisianan blacks. However, the bill passed the House in February and the Senate in April.

== Move to Chicago and death ==
In 1887, Allain was accused of corruption and lost his standing in the party and his seat in the legislature. In the early 1890s, his plantation began to fail, and he eventually sold it and moved to Chicago in about 1893. He held several minor public positions, and continued to advocate for civil rights in local and national organizations. In 1900 he was a part of the National Afro-American Council meetings in Indianapolis.

He was married to Aline Coleman and had six children. He was a member of the Catholic Church. He died February 2, 1917 in Chicago. His funeral was held at St. Monica's Catholic Church.
