= George Kelso =

American politician

George Young Kelso was an American politician. He was delegate at Louisiana’s 1868 constitutional convention and state senator in Louisiana from 1868 to 1876. He was a “colored”, “radical” Republican.

== Biography ==
George Young Kelso lived in Rapides Parish, Louisiana. He gave a statement about voter suppression in 1872. He attended an 1873 "colored convention" in Louisiana. He was part of a Republican parish convention.

Eric Foner documented him as an editor and co-owner of the Louisianan newspaper in New Orleans and as an employee of the custom house in New Orleans who faced the violence during the 1876 election campaign.

== See also ==
- African American officeholders from the end of the Civil War until before 1900
