= Francis E. Dumas =

American plantation owner (1837–1901)

- Born: Francis Ernest Dumas; 1837
- Died: March 26, 1901 (aged 63–64)
- Allegiance: United States
- Branch: Union Army
- Commands: Company B of the 1st Louisiana Native Guards; 2nd Louisiana Native Guards
- Conflicts: American Civil War: Western Theater

Francis Ernest Dumas (1837 – March 26, 1901) was an American plantation owner and slaveholder of Louisiana. He was of African American and Creole heritage, and served as an officer in the Union Army during the American Civil War.

== Biography ==
Francis E. Dumas, born in 1837, was the son of plantation owner Joseph Dumas and was an octoroon from his mother's side. He spoke five languages and had lived in France for some time, inheriting the sugar plantation upon his return. There was no simple way for him to free his slaves under Louisiana state law.

When the Civil War began, Dumas freed over 100 of his slaves and enlisted them as a company in the Union Army. He accordingly was commissioned as Captain of Company B of the 1st Louisiana Native Guards and received a promotion to Major in the 2nd Louisiana Native Guards, one of the highest ranks achieved by an African American during the war. He saw combat in the western theater and resigned his commission over disputes on July 3, 1863.

He was a candidate for Lieutenant Governor in 1868 on the James G. Taliaferro ticket backed by publisher Louis Charles Roudanez. He turned down a nomination to be Louisiana's Republican Party nominee for Lieutenant Governor after losing the nomination for governor to Henry C. Warmoth by a few votes on the second ballot after leading the first. Dumas was chosen by President Ulysses S. Grant as minister to Liberia in 1869, but turned it down.

Dumas was initially a candidate for Louisiana Secretary of State on the 1872 Liberal Party Ticket, headed by D.B. Penn for Governor. However, he left the ticket by September 1 before the election when John McEnery became the new candidate for governor, and D.B. Penn took the Lt. Governor spot. Dumas was replaced by another black man, Samuel Armstead.
