= James G. Taliaferro =

American judge

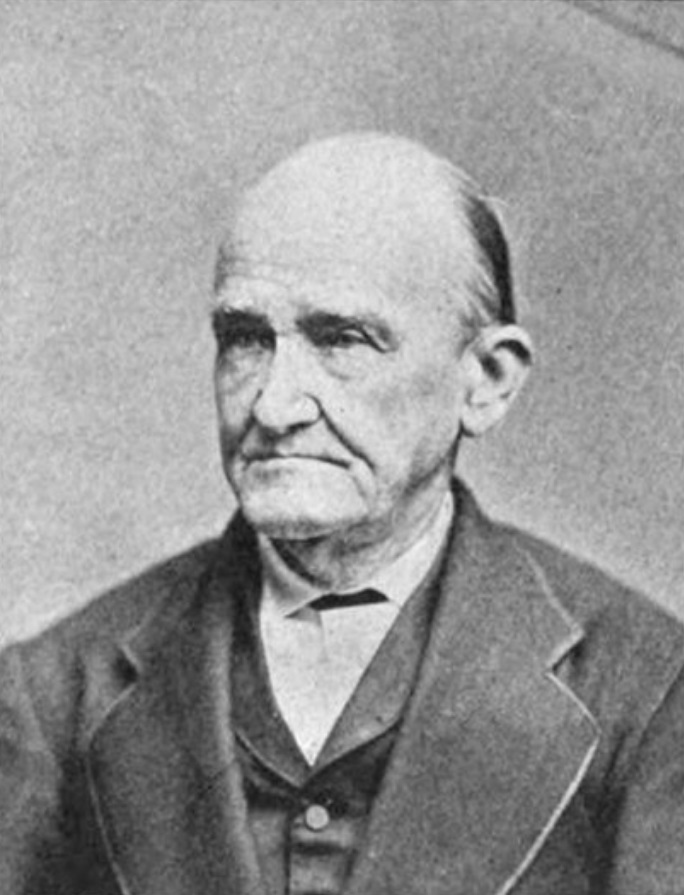
- Judge Taliaferro, 1891.

Associate Justice of the Louisiana Supreme Court
- In office 1866–1876

Personal details
- Born: September 28, 1798 Amherst, Virginia
- Died: October 13, 1876 (aged 78) Harrisonburg, Louisiana
- Education: Transylvania University

James Govan Taliaferro (September 28, 1798 – October 13, 1876) was a lawyer, newspaper publisher, and judge in Louisiana. As the secession movement grew he remained a staunch Unionist and was held for some time in a Confederate prison during the American Civil War.

A Whig, he later joined the Republican Party and was an outspoken opponent of secession. He was an opponent of the Thirteenth Amendment that abolished slavery and ran for Lieutenant Governor in 1865 on a platform against Black suffrage. He remained active in Republican Party politics during the Reconstruction Era and was a candidate for governor in 1868 with the backing of Louis Charles Roudanez and his African American newspaper The New Orleans Tribune. He ran for governor with running mate Francis Ernest Dumas, an "almost white" Union officer and former slaveholder. They lost to Henry C. Warmoth, a Civil War veteran officer from the North who ended up undermining civil rights legislation and being removed from office for election corruption in 1872. Taliaferro's family papers are at Louisiana State University.

== Early years ==
Taliaferro was born to Zacharias Taliaferro and Sally Warwick on September 28, 1798, in Amherst, Virginia. The family moved to Claiborne County, Mississippi in 1806 and then to Catahoula Parish, Louisiana in 1815.

Taliaferro graduated from Transylvania College in Lexington, Kentucky. He married Elizabeth M.B. Williamson of Lexington in 1819. Taliaferro became a lawyer in Harrisonburg, Louisiana and served as a judge in Catahoula Parish. He was Parish Judge from 1834 until 1847.

Taliaferro published the Harrisonburg Independent for several years from about 1856 until 1861. He represented Catahoula Parish in the constitutional convention of 1852.

== Secession and Civil War years ==
In 1861 he was representative at the secession convention where he was a strong opponent and refused to sign on. As a delegate to the Louisiana state secessionist convention from Catahoula Parish, he argued strongly against leaving the American Union. Taliaferro "denied the constitutional right [of a state] to leave the Union and painted a gloomy picture of economic chaos, blighted prosperity, staggering taxation and 'fatal prostration of Louisiana's interests under a southern Confederation,' and he could see no way ahead to prevent final anarchy and war. So 'radical' were the ideas of Taliaferro that the convention refused to print his protest in the pages of [its journal]." In a speech to the convention, he said:

My conscience is my guide; my judgment and patriotism approve, and though I am scorned and hissed, I am willing to abide the arbitrament of time and events as to the correctness of my course. The act I denounce as one of mad folly, and of which, if my judgment errs not, every signer of that paper will come to be ashamed; and for one, it shall not herald my name to the future infamy which I predict will be its fate.

At the secession convention he also said:

"Sir, I am behind no man in attachment to Louisiana. I am unable to see that higher and grander position which gentlemen say Louisiana is to assume by the act of secession. Clouds and darkness rather, are before me. The dimness of age, perhaps, prevents me from penetrating the gloom and seeing the bright skies and green fields beyond. In the exercise of my best judgment, and under my honest convictions of the ruinous tendency of this measure, I must pronounce it an act of madness and of folly. Sir, I vote Nay."

Two of his sons served in the Union Army during the American Civil War.

== Post-war career ==
Taliaferro was later appointed by Governor James Madison Wells to serve as an associate justice on the Louisiana Supreme Court, remaining in that office from 1866 until 1876, and was a delegate to the Louisiana Constitutional Convention 1868. He ran for governor but another Republican candidate was chosen. He died in Harrisonburg, Louisiana October 13, 1876. He is buried along with his wife in Alexander Cemetery in Manifest, Louisiana, Catahoula Parish.

Party political offices
Preceded by Henry Watkins Allen	Democratic nominee for Governor of Louisiana; 1868	Succeeded by John McEnery
