= 1868 United States presidential election in Louisiana =

- November 3, 1868
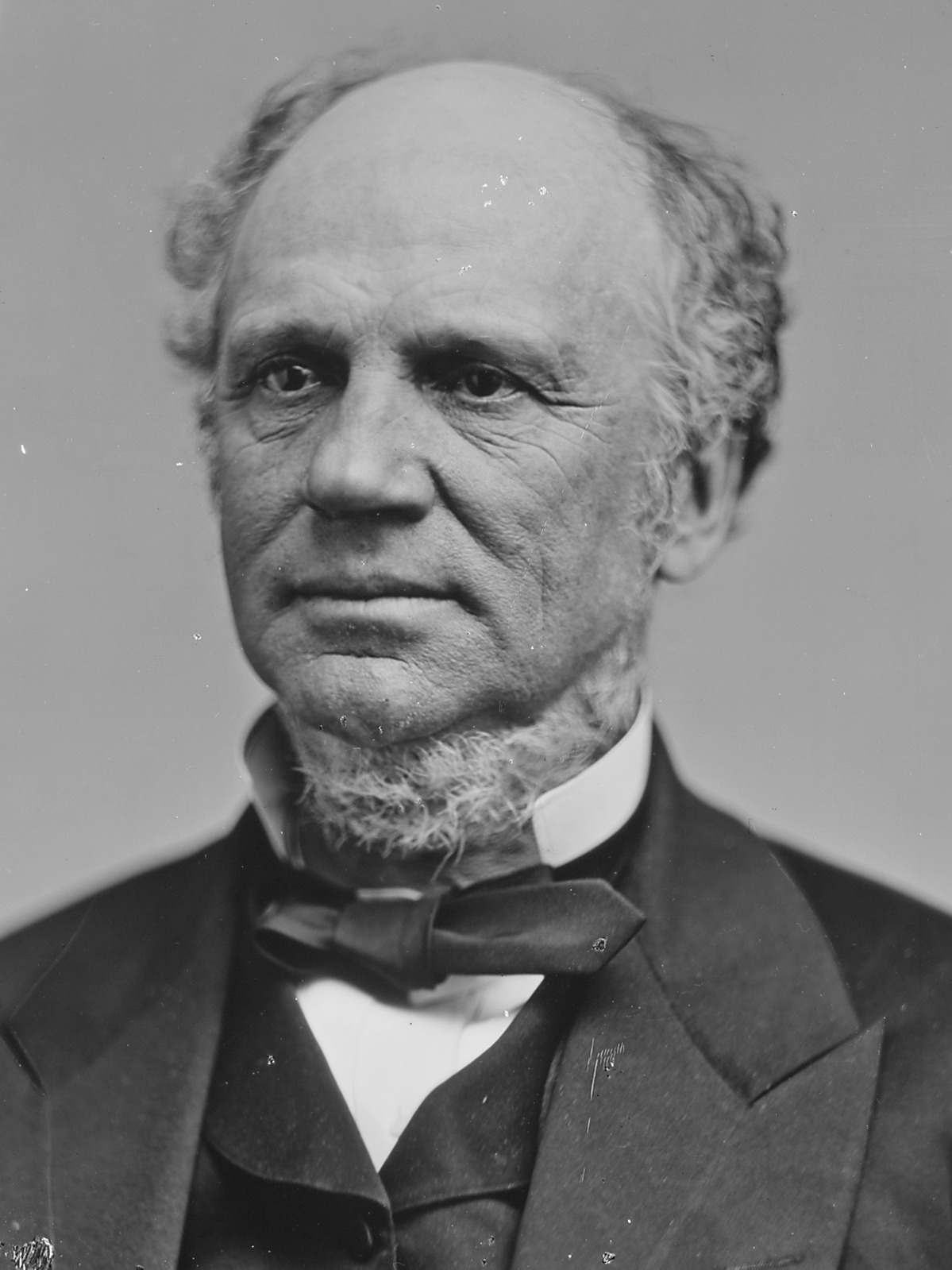

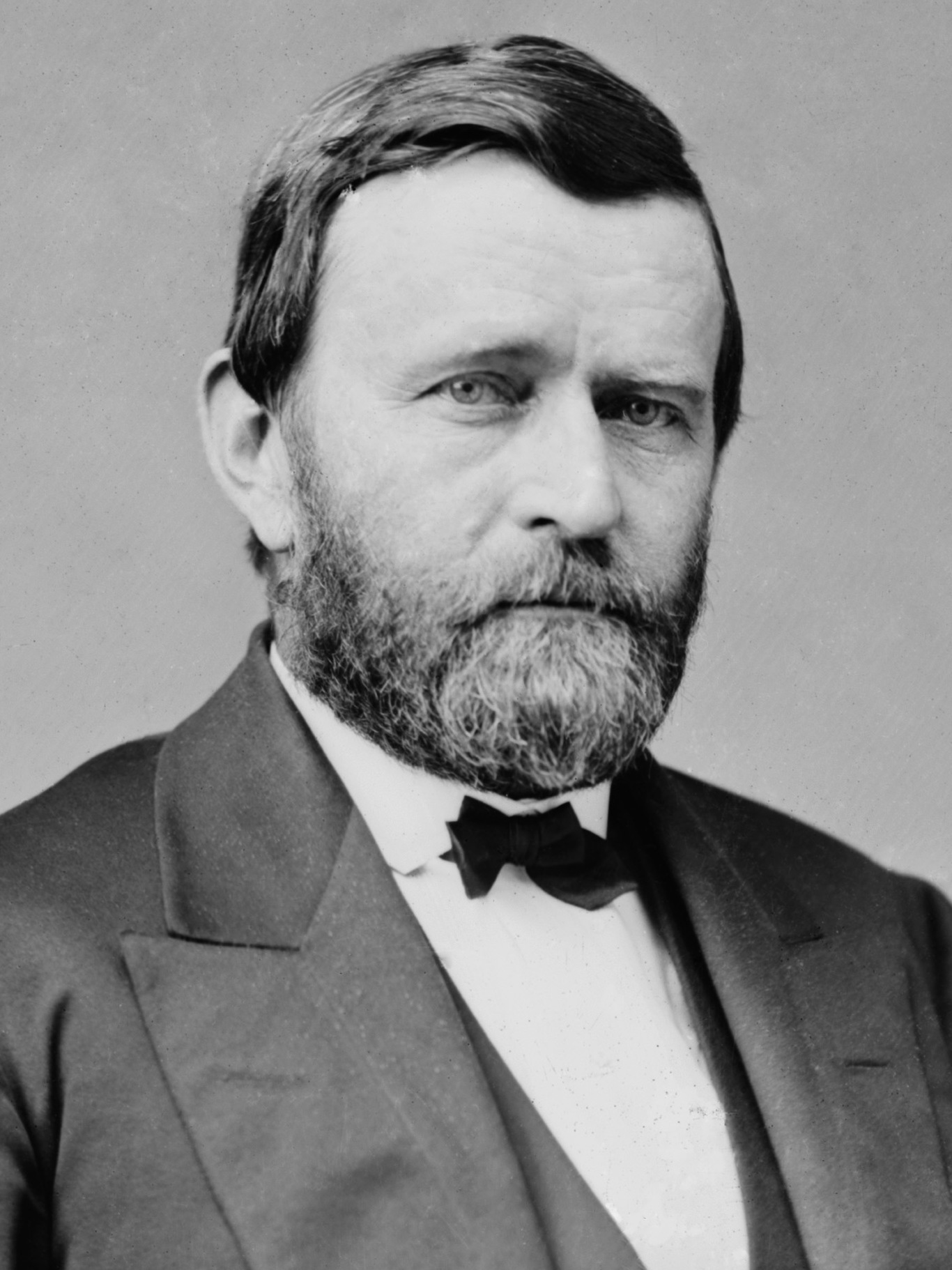
Nominee	Horatio Seymour	Ulysses S. Grant
Party	Democratic	Republican
Home state	New York	Illinois
Running mate	Francis Preston Blair Jr.	Schuyler Colfax
Electoral vote	7	0
Popular vote	80,225	33,263
Percentage	70.69%	29.31%
Parish results
Seymour
50–60%
60–70%
70–80%
80–90%
90–100%
Grant
50–60%
60–70%
70–80%
80–90%
President before election
Andrew Johnson
Democratic
Elected President
Ulysses S. Grant
Republican

The 1868 United States presidential election in Louisiana took place on November 3, 1868, as part of the 1868 United States presidential election. Voters chose seven representatives, or electors to the Electoral College, who voted for president and vice president.

The election in Louisiana, as in much of the former Confederacy, was marred by considerable violence against the state's African American voters by the Ku Klux Klan. Although at the time normally relegated to majority white areas, the Klan's violence in Louisiana spread to the black belt, making it impossible for black voters in some counties to vote. These counties gave their votes nearly unanimously to Horatio Seymour, the Democratic nominee, while the majority-black counties which saw little violence voted strongly for Ulysses S. Grant, the Republican nominee. Seymour won the state by a margin of 41.38%. Louisiana would be Seymour's second strongest victory in terms of percentage in the popular vote after Kentucky.

As of 2024, this remains the only time that Louisiana has voted Democratic while neighboring Arkansas voted Republican.

== Results ==
1868 United States presidential election in Louisiana
Party	Candidate	Votes	%
Democratic	Horatio Seymour	80,225	70.69%
Republican	Ulysses S. Grant	33,263	29.31%
Total votes		113,488	100%

=== Results By Parish ===
1868 United States Presidential Election in Louisiana (By Parish)
Parish	Horatio Seymour Democratic		Ulysses S. Grant Republican		Total Votes Cast
Parish	#	%	#	%	Total Votes Cast
Ascension	1,125	43.00%	1,491	57.00%	2,616
Assumption	1,375	49.78%	1,387	50.22%	2,762
Avoyelles	1,345	72.12%	520	27.88%	1,865
Bienville	1,385	99.93%	1	0.07%	1,386
Bossier	1,634	99.94%	1	0.06%	1,635
Caddo	2,895	99.97%	1	0.03%	2,896
Calcasieu	782	98.86%	9	1.14%	791
Catahoula	809	84.36%	150	15.64%	959
Caldwell	503	94.73%	28	5.27%	531
Carroll	786	36.09%	1,392	63.91%	2,178
Claiborne	2,952	99.93%	2	0.07%	2,954
Concordia	201	11.45%	1,554	88.55%	1,755
DeSoto	1,260	100.00%	0	0.00%	1,260
East Baton Rouge	1,350	51.98%	1,247	48.02%	2,597
East Feliciana	1,411	68.66%	644	31.34%	2,055
Franklin	1,213	100.00%	0	0.00%	1,213
Iberville	704	25.21%	2,088	74.79%	2,792
Jackson	1,398	100.00%	0	0.00%	1,398
Jefferson	2,222	76.78%	672	23.22%	2,894
Lafourche	1,796	52.62%	1,617	47.38%	3,413
Livingston	670	81.81%	149	18.19%	819
Lafayette	1,422	100.00%	0	0.00%	1,422
Madison	163	89.91%	1,453	10.09%	1,616
Morehouse	1,525	99.93%	1	0.07%	1,526
Natchitoches	1,375	41.79%	1,915	58.21%	3,290
Orleans	24,668	95.44%	1,178	4.56%	25,846
Ouachita	1,101	56.96%	832	43.04%	1,933
Pointe Coupee	896	36.59%	1,553	63.41%	2,449
Plaquemines	273	17.04%	1,329	82.96%	1,602
Rapides	1,623	42.72%	2,176	57.28%	3,799
Sabine	934	99.79%	2	0.21%	936
St. Bernard	473	99.79%	1	0.21%	474
St. Charles	264	16.51%	1,335	83.49%	1,599
St. Helena	1,094	88.94%	136	11.06%	1,230
St. John the Baptist	556	66.99%	274	33.01%	830
St. James	775	26.40%	2,161	73.60%	2,936
St. Landry	4,787	100.00%	0	0.00%	4,787
St. Martin	1,456	98.11%	28	1.89%	1,484
St. Mary	1,819	61.43%	1,142	38.57%	2,961
St. Tammany	704	59.97%	470	40.03%	1,174
Tensas	383	27.34%	1,018	72.66%	1,401
Terrebonne	1,296	45.68%	1,541	54.32%	2,837
Union	1,416	99.93%	1	0.07%	1,417
Vermilion	958	100.00%	0	0.00%	958
Washington	656	100.00%	0	0.00%	656
West Baton Rouge	433	42.53%	585	57.47%	1,018
West Feliciana	648	36.32%	1,136	63.68%	1,784
Winn	711	94.30%	43	5.70%	754
Total	80,225	70.69%	33,263	29.31%	113,488

== See also ==
- United States presidential elections in Louisiana
