= John McEnery (politician) =

American politician

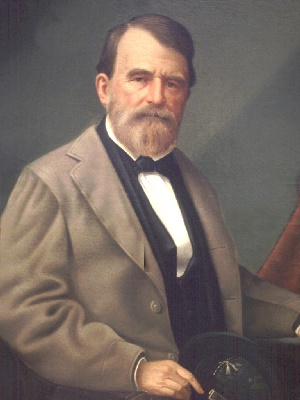
- John McEnery's portrait, 1880s

25th Governor of Louisiana
- In office January 13, 1873 – May 22, 1873 Disputed with William P. Kellogg
- Lieutenant: Davidson B. Penn
- Preceded by: P. B. S. Pinchback
- Succeeded by: William P. Kellogg
- In office September 14, 1874 – September 16, 1874 Disputed with William P. Kellogg

Personal details
- Born: March 31, 1833 Petersburg, Virginia, U.S.
- Died: March 28, 1891 (aged 57) New Orleans, Louisiana, U.S.
- Party: Democratic
- Other political affiliations: Liberal Republican (1870–1872)

Military service
- Allegiance: Confederate States of America
- Branch/service: Confederate States Army
- Years of service: 1861–1864
- Rank: Lieutenant Colonel
- Commands: 4th Louisiana Infantry Battalion
- Battles/wars: American Civil War

John McEnery (March 31, 1833, Petersburg, Virginia – March 28, 1891) was a Louisiana Democratic politician and lawyer who was considered by Democrats to be the winner of the highly contested 1872 election for Governor of Louisiana. After extended controversy over election results, the Republican candidate William Pitt Kellogg was certified. McEnery, who had been an officer in the Confederate States Army during the American Civil War, was not allowed to take office following a weighing in by the federal government and local Republicans loyal to President Ulysses S. Grant.

In the election of 1872, McEnery, a Democrat, was supported by a coalition of Democrats and anti-Grant Republicans, including Republican Gov. Henry C. Warmoth. Warmoth's opponents in the Republican Party remained loyal to President Grant, and supported Republican nominee William Pitt Kellogg.

Governor Warmoth had appointed the State Returning Board, which administered elections. A rival board endorsed Kellogg, although Kellogg's board had no returns or ballots to count; Warmoth was impeached and removed for "stealing" the election. The lieutenant governor, black Republican P. B. S. Pinchback, became governor for the last 35 days of Warmoth's term. Both McEnery and Kellogg had inaugural parties and certified lists of local officeholders. In the spring of 1873, McEnery and his friends formed a rump legislature in New Orleans.

After a failed attempt in 1873, five thousand of his armed white militia entered New Orleans and fought off the police and state militia on September 14, 1874. They occupied the statehouse and armory and turned the Republican Kellogg out of office. This was called the Battle of Liberty Place. It was not until Federal troops were on their way that the forces retreated from New Orleans. McEnery had encouraged armed action in a speech in June:

There is not a decent thinking man in Louisiana who will deny that race lines of distinction are already sharply drawn, and that as each day passes the breach gapes wider, that separates the white from the colored race in this State of ours. Further, that unless this insolent encroachment on the rights, political and social of the white people of Louisiana is ended, the day of the irrepressible conflict will come when physical force shall solve the political problems of Louisiana polities. The only means of averting this calamity lies in the union of the white people of the State, representing as they do, its virtue, courage and wealth, into one compact and imposing phalanx.

The extended controversy contributed to violence throughout the state. The Colfax Massacre on Easter Sunday 1873 was related to the contested election. White Democratic militia, raised from surrounding parishes, attacked Republican blacks who had gathered at the Colfax courthouse to defend Republican officeholders. The attackers killed more than 80 black men; three whites were killed. The events were preceded by rumors on both sides, as tensions rose in the parish.

Similarly, in Coushatta, the seat of the new Red River Parish, Republican Marshall H. Twitchell was the influential state senator. White militia drove six Republican officeholders from town, but killed them before they could leave the state. In 1874, Edward T. Lewis (politician) of St. Landry Parish led the formation of paramilitary organization the White League. They served as an arm of the Democratic Party in driving out Republicans and suppressing black voting at elections. Grant Parish and Colfax, formed under the Reconstruction legislature, were named for Reconstruction President Grant and Vice President Schuyler Colfax.

McEnery's prominent identification with white supremacy assisted his brother Samuel McEnery in being elected Lieutenant Governor of Louisiana in 1880. Samuel McEnery succeeded to the Governorship after Louis Wiltz died, and retained the office until 1888. Amid allegations of corruption, Samuel McEnery was not re-elected that year.

Party political offices
| Preceded by James G. Taliaferro | Democratic nominee for Governor of Louisiana; 1872 | Succeeded by Francis T. Nicholls |
Political offices
| Preceded by P. B. S. Pinchback | Governor of Louisiana; 1873 | Succeeded by William P. Kellogg |
