= C. C. Antoine =

Louisiana politician and civil rights activist (1836-1921)

Caesar Carpentier Antoine
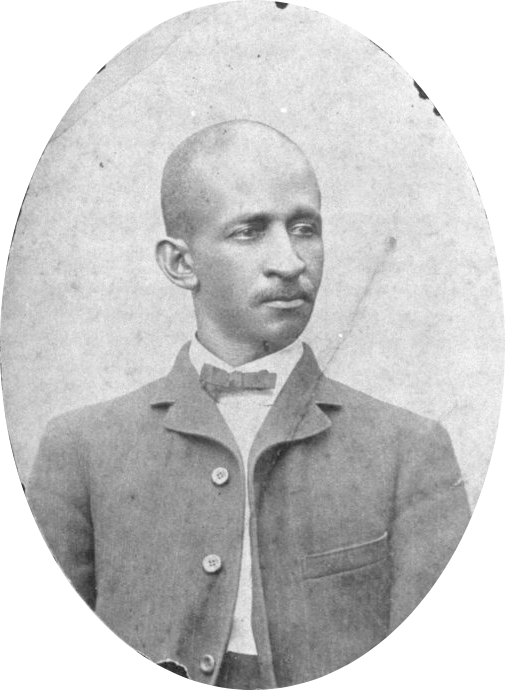
- Antoine c. 1873

13th Lieutenant Governor of Louisiana
- In office May 22, 1873 – April 24, 1877
- Governor: William P. Kellogg; Stephen B. Packard
- Preceded by: P.B.S. Pinchback
- Succeeded by: Louis A. Wiltz

Louisiana State Senator from Caddo Parish
- In office 1868–1872

Personal details
- Born: c. 1836 New Orleans, Louisiana, U.S.
- Died: 1921 (aged 84–85) Shreveport, Louisiana, U.S.
- Resting place: New Bethlehem Baptist Church Cemetery
- Party: Republican
- Relations: Felix C. Antoine (brother)
- Occupation: Barber, Editor, Businessman

Military service
- Allegiance: United States of America
- Branch/service: Union Army
- Rank: Captain
- Unit: 7th Louisiana (Colored) Infantry Regiment
- Battles/wars: American Civil War

Caesar Carpentier Antoine (c. 1836–1921) was a soldier, businessman, editor, and African-American Republican politician in Louisiana during the Reconstruction era. He served in the Union Army during the American Civil War and was a member of the Louisiana Senate before serving as the 13th lieutenant governor of Louisiana.

== Biography ==
Born a free man of color in New Orleans, Felix C. Antoine was his brother.

During the Civil War, he served as Captain in the 7th Louisiana Regiment Infantry and 10th U.S. Colored Heavy Artillery Regiment. After the war, he moved to Shreveport, Louisiana. He was a member of St. Paul's Colored Methodist Episcopal Church and lived in the Allendale neighborhood.

He was elected as a state senator for Caddo Parish in 1868, partaking in the Louisiana Constitutional Convention. He served until 1872 when he was elected to serve as Lieutenant Governor of Louisiana, the third man of color to hold that position. He co-founded a newspaper with P. B. S. Pinchback, his immediate predecessor.

He became a Worshipful Master in Freemasonry in 1884. Shreveport's Freemason Lodge Number 185 of the Prince Hall Masons is named in his honor.

In 1887, he co-founded Comité des Citoyens, which fought the case that became Plessy v. Ferguson, and became its vice-president.

== Legacy and honors ==
In 1984, a Shreveport park was named for Antoine and a sculpture of him was installed in it. A tombstone was dedicated at Antoine's gravesite on Memorial Day, 31 May 1999.

In 2008, C. C. Antoine Celebration was established as an annual event during Black History Month in Shreveport.

Antoine's house in Shreveport was placed on the National Register of Historic Places on August 20, 1999. It was destroyed by fire in May 2022.

== See also ==
- List of minority governors and lieutenant governors in the United States

Political offices
Preceded by P.B.S. Pinchback	Lieutenant Governor of Louisiana; Caesar Carpetier Antoine; 1872–1876	Succeeded by Louis A. Wiltz
