= William Pitt Kellogg =

Louisiana politician (1830–1918)

William P. Kellogg
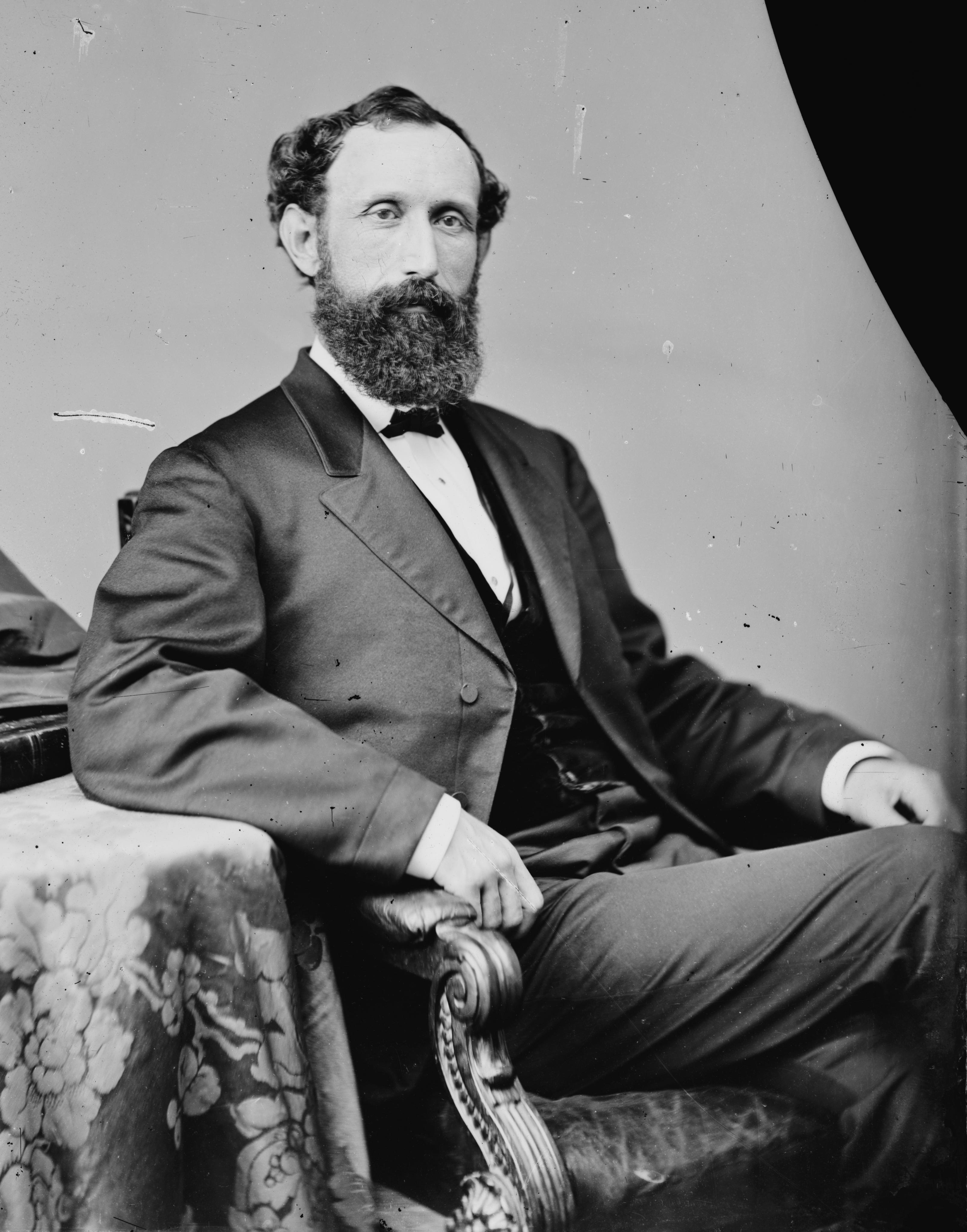
- Photo of Kellog from the Brady-Handy collection, circa 1870.

Member of the U.S. House of Representatives from Louisiana's 3rd district
- In office March 4, 1883 – March 3, 1885
- Preceded by: Chester Bidwell Darrall
- Succeeded by: Edward James Gay

United States Senator from Louisiana
- In office March 4, 1877 – March 3, 1883
- Preceded by: Joseph R. West
- Succeeded by: Randall L. Gibson
- In office July 9, 1868 – November 1, 1872
- Preceded by: John Slidell
- Succeeded by: James B. Eustis

26th Governor of Louisiana
- In office January 13, 1873 – January 8, 1877 (disputed with John McEnery until May 22, 1873)
- Lieutenant: Caesar Antoine
- Preceded by: P. B. S. Pinchback
- Succeeded by: Stephen B. Packard

Chief Justice of the Nebraska Territory Supreme Court
- In office 1861–1867

Personal details
- Born: William Pitt Kellogg; December 8, 1830 Orwell, Vermont, U.S.
- Died: August 10, 1918 (aged 87) Washington, D.C., U.S.
- Party: Republican
- Spouse: Mary Emily Wills
- Education: Norwich Military Academy

Military service
- Allegiance: United States
- Branch/service: United States Army
- Years of service: 1861–1862
- Rank: Brigadier General
- Commands: 7th Illinois Cavalry Regiment
- Battles/wars: American Civil War

William Pitt Kellogg (December 8, 1830 – August 10, 1918) was an American lawyer and Republican Party politician who served as the governor of Louisiana from 1873 to 1877 and twice served as a United States senator during the Reconstruction era. He was one of the most important politicians in Louisiana during and immediately after Reconstruction and was notable for being elected after most other Republican officials had been defeated when Democrats regained control of state politics, though he was also one of the Northern-born politicians who were derided by Southerners as "carpetbaggers" during this period. Kellogg is also notable as one of the few incumbent senators ever to be elected to the U.S. House of Representatives, where he served one term. He was the last Republican U.S. senator from Louisiana until David Vitter in 2005.

== Early life ==
Kellogg was born in Orwell, Vermont, to Sherman Kellogg, a minister, and Rebecca Eaton. He was educated in common schools and attended Norwich Military Academy. His family moved to Peoria, Illinois, when he was 18 where he taught school and read law. In 1854 he was admitted to the bar and began practicing as an attorney in Canton. He also entered into politics around this time and was a founding member of the Illinois Republican Party, becoming a delegate to the 1860 Republican Convention in Chicago and later a presidential elector for Abraham Lincoln.

== Career ==
Kellogg was appointed as chief justice of the Nebraska Territory by Lincoln in 1861 but served only briefly in the role. With the outbreak of the Civil War, Kellogg was granted a leave of absence and returned to Illinois to organize the 7th Regiment Illinois Volunteer Cavalry. By 1862, he had risen to the rank of colonel serving in Missouri under the command of General John Pope. He was promoted to brigadier general but resigned due to ill health on June 1, 1862. He returned to Nebraska and resumed his work as chief justice. After the Civil War, Kellogg was elected as a companion of the Military Order of the Loyal Legion of the United States.

On April 14, 1865, hours before his assassination, Lincoln appointed Kellogg as the federal collector of customs of the port of New Orleans. This launched Kellogg's 20-year political career in Louisiana, notable as he was one of the first perceived carpetbaggers. He remained collector of New Orleans, despite complaints, until 1868 and was then elected to the United States Senate. That year, "reconstructed" Louisiana was readmitted to the federal Union.

In 1872, Kellogg ran on the Republican ticket and became governor after a disputed election. He resigned from the Senate to take office. In the election, John McEnery, a Democrat, ran against Kellogg. The sitting Governor Henry Clay Warmoth, although a Republican, opposed the Republican Party faction that was loyal to President Ulysses S. Grant, who was supporting Kellogg. Warmoth supported McEnery.

The results of the election were contested by the Democrats. The politics of the state were in turmoil for months, as both candidates held inauguration celebrations, certified their local candidate slates and tried to gather political power. As governor, Warmoth controlled the State Returning Board, the institution which administered elections. With the election challenged, Warmoth's board named McEnery the winner. A rival board claimed Kellogg to be the victor, although the board had no ballots or returns to count.

The House of Representatives declared that the Kellogg government was "not much better than a successful conspiracy." A Senate committee reported that the entire Louisiana 1872 election had been unfair and that both state governments were illegal. It recommended that a new election be held under federal supervision. However, the committee also emphasized that Kellogg would likely have received the most votes in a fair election.

Grant disagreed with the Senate committee recommendation and supported Kellogg's claim. Three years later, Grant would state that Louisiana's 1872 election "was a gigantic fraud, and there are no reliable returns of its result." Grant said that he was "not altogether certain" which candidate the voters chose, but that he believed Kellogg had "more right" to the governorship than McEnery, due to Warmoth's actions having illegally cost Kellogg 20,000 votes.

Warmoth was impeached in 1872 for certifying McEnery as the victor of the election, in violation of a federal court order. Lieutenant Governor P. B. S. Pinchback, a black Republican, became acting governor. On January 14, 1873, both Republicans and Democrats organized separate inaugurations, with federal courts and soldiers backing Kellogg.

McEnery's faction established a "rump legislature" in New Orleans to oppose Kellogg's actions. McEnery urged his supporters to take up arms against Kellogg's allegedly fraudulent government. In April 1873, white attackers killed at least sixty Black men at the Colfax massacre. In 1874 the anti-Republican and white supremacist White League sent 5,000 paramilitary men into New Orleans, wherein the Battle of Liberty Place, they defeated the 3500-man Metropolitan Police and state militia. They took over the state government offices for a few days but retreated before the arrival of federal troops sent as reinforcements at Kellogg's request.

In February 1876, Kellogg was impeached by the Louisiana House of Representatives. The Senate did not convict him, however, and he remained in office. According to historian William Gillette, "By having invoked federal authority in civil law and having employed federal force in state politics, he [Grant] had mounted a successful coups d'état."

Kellogg's lieutenant governor was Caesar Antoine, an African-American native of New Orleans. He had been a State Senator from Shreveport before running as lieutenant governor. Despite the intense backlash against the Republican Party among white Democrats in the South, Kellogg was elected to the United States Senate in 1876. He served in the Senate until 1883. He did not seek re-election, for his party was too weak in the South to be competitive. He was the chairman of the Senate Committee on Railroads from 1881 to 1883.

Kellogg was elected to the United States House of Representatives in 1882, defeating the incumbent fellow Republican Chester Bidwell Darrall and served one term from 1883 to 1885. He was defeated for re-election in 1884 by Edward James Gay. He continued to live in Washington, D.C., but retired from political life. He died in Washington and is buried at Arlington National Cemetery in Virginia.

Kellogg was one of the most important politicians in Louisiana during and immediately after Reconstruction. He was able to maintain power for much longer than most Republican elected officials who had come to the area from the North. He is also notable as one of few senators to be elected to the House of Representatives immediately after leaving the Senate. (Claude Pepper, a 20th-century Florida Democrat, was similarly elected to the House after having served in the Senate but did not begin his long House tenure until 12 years after the end of his Senate service.)

Party political offices
Preceded by Henry C. Warmoth	Republican nominee for Governor of Louisiana; 1872	Succeeded by Stephen B. Packard
U.S. Senate
Preceded by vacant^{1}	U.S. senator (Class 3) from Louisiana; 1868–1872; Served alongside: John S. Harris, Joseph R. West	Succeeded by vacant^{2}
Preceded by Joseph R. West	U.S. senator (Class 2) from Louisiana; 1877–1883; Served alongside: James B. Eustis, Benjamin F. Jonas	Succeeded by Randall L. Gibson
Political offices
Preceded by John McEnery	Governor of Louisiana; 1873–1877	Succeeded by Stephen B. Packard
U.S. House of Representatives
Preceded by Chester Bidwell Darrall	Member of the U.S. House of Representatives from Louisiana's 3rd congressional district 1883–1885	Succeeded by Edward James Gay
Notes and references
1. Because Louisiana seceded from the Union in 1861, seat was vacant from 1861 to 1868 when John Slidell withdrew from the Senate.; 2. Seat contested until 1876 when James B. Eustis was elected.
