= Henry Clay Warmoth =

American politician

Henry C. Warmoth
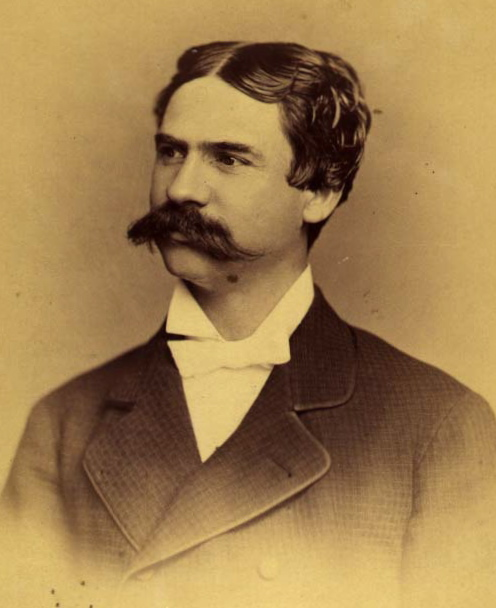
- Photo by William Kurtz, c. 1875

23rd Governor of Louisiana
- In office June 27, 1868 – December 9, 1872
- Lieutenant: Oscar Dunn; P. B. S. Pinchback
- Preceded by: Joshua Baker
- Succeeded by: P. B. S. Pinchback

Personal details
- Born: Henry Clay Warmoth; May 9, 1842 McLeansboro, Illinois
- Died: September 30, 1931 (aged 89) New Orleans, Louisiana
- Party: Republican
- Spouse: Sally Durand
- Children: 3

Military service
- Allegiance: United States
- Branch/service: United States Army
- Years of service: 1862 - 1865
- Rank: Lieutenant Colonel
- Unit: 32nd Missouri Infantry Regiment
- Battles/wars: American Civil War

Henry Clay Warmoth (May 9, 1842 – September 30, 1931) was an American attorney and veteran Civil War officer in the Union Army who was elected governor and state representative of Louisiana. A Republican, he was 26 years old when elected as 23rd Governor of Louisiana, one of the youngest governors elected in United States history. He served during the early Reconstruction Era, from 1868 to 1872.

In 1871, Lieutenant Governor Oscar Dunn assumed the office of acting governor from May 5, 1871, to July 18, 1871, after Warmoth sustained an injury to his foot that required an extended absence from the state, thus making Dunn the first African-American governor in the history of the United States. As acting governor, Dunn weighed in on a number of serious matters, including a petition from four European consuls to commute the sentences of two Spanish nationals scheduled for execution. Nearing the end of his recovery in Pass Christian, Mississippi, Warmoth sent his secretary to New Orleans to lock Dunn out of the governor's office after disagreement over executive actions. Warmoth soon thereafter returned to the city and his office.

Facing strong criticism from some Republican leaders for weakening civil rights legislation and for endorsing a Democratic/Fusionist ticket in the 1872 election, Warmoth ended his term under state legislature's impeachment proceedings and was suspended from office. Lieutenant Governor P.B.S. Pinchback, who had replaced Dunn as Lieutenant Governor after his sudden death in office, assumed office during Warmoth's absence, becoming the second African-American governor in the history of the United States, after Dunn. The legislature dropped the impeachment charges against Warmoth after his term of office ended.

Warmoth was the first elected Reconstruction Governor of Louisiana. He stayed in the state and was elected in 1876 as a Louisiana State Representative, serving one term from 1876 to 1878. He also managed his sugar cane plantation. The Reconstruction Era ended in 1877 as president Rutherford B. Hayes and the federal government withdrew its troops from the state. In 1888, Warmoth challenged former governor Francis T. Nicholls in a gubernatorial contest and lost to the Democrat; the election was noted for widespread voter fraud as Democrats suppressed black Republicans voting. In 1890, Warmoth was appointed as US Collector of Customs in New Orleans and served for several years.

== Early life ==
Henry Clay Warmoth was born in 1842, in McLeansboro, Illinois, to parents of Dutch descent, the eldest child of Isaac Sanders & Eleanor (Lane) Warmoth, and named for statesman Henry Clay. He studied in the public school system of Illinois. He studied law and was admitted to the Missouri bar in 1860. He established his legal career in that state, being appointed as the district attorney of the Eighteenth Judicial District.

== Civil War ==
During the American Civil War, Warmoth served as lieutenant colonel of the 32nd Missouri Volunteer Infantry. He was at the capture of Arkansas Post and was wounded in the Battle of Vicksburg. He was dishonorably discharged for alleged exaggerations of Union losses. After his personal appeal to the Commander-in-Chief, President Abraham Lincoln reinstated Warmoth's military status.

After reinstatement, Warmoth was reunited with his regiment. He commanded at the Battle of Lookout Mountain near Chattanooga, took part in Sherman's Atlanta campaign, and reinforced General Nathaniel Banks at the Red Cedar retreat. He was later commissioned as judge of the Department of the Gulf Provost Court.

In early 1865, Warmoth resigned from the military to resume a legal practice.

== Political career ==
Warmoth went to New Orleans, which was still occupied by Union Army troops. He specialized in the kind of law practice for which his military experience had qualified him: cotton claims and courts-martial decisions. At the same time, he became an active Republican, gaining support among freedmen.

In November 1865, Warmoth ran for territorial delegate as a Republican in an unauthorized election, in which black Louisianians cast over 19,000 votes, nearly as many as were won among whites by the victorious Democratic candidate for governor. Louisiana restricted the suffrage to white males, so the blacks' votes were not counted. Republicans hoped to show that full suffrage could result in competitive elections. By electing a territorial delegate, they were making the statement that no legal state of Louisiana existed while it was occupied by the Union Army, and Congress should remand it to the status of a territory. Congress did not do so.

Because of continuing violence in the South, especially the Memphis Riots of 1866 and the New Orleans Massacre of 1866, Congress passed the Reconstruction Act to create five military districts to oversee changes in the former Confederate states. It also passed the Fourteenth Amendment to extend full citizenship to freedmen. Louisiana and Texas were put under the Fifth Military District, and the US Army was assigned to oversee the process by which a new constitutional convention could be called, with delegates to be voted for by both blacks and whites alike.

When the convention had finished its work, a ratification election was called and the Republican Party chose a state ticket. Warmoth was selected as the nominee for governor over Major Francis E. Dumas. He faced a Democrat and Louisiana Supreme Court Justice James G. Taliaferro, a planter and wartime Unionist backed by the True Radical faction, which was composed mostly of black Republicans. Taliaferro found some support from Democrats.

=== Governor ===
Warmoth carried the state by some 26,000 votes, and the Reconstruction constitution was ratified. Warmoth was sworn into office on July 13, 1868. Elected at 26, he was one of the youngest governors in United States history. (Stevens T. Mason, the first governor of Michigan, was the youngest state governor, elected at 24.)

Elected with Warmoth was Oscar Dunn as lieutenant governor, an African-American leader in the Prince Hall Freemasons. He had a wide network in New Orleans, where he was a painting contractor. When Dunn died suddenly in office in 1871, he was succeeded by P.B.S. Pinchback, a person of color who was President of the State Senate.

Turbulence and some violence marred the April 1868 election. The rise of the Ku Klux Klan over the summer worsened the disorder. By fall, night-riding, murder, and intimidation were common. The number of Republicans killed for political reasons may have approached 800. Large riots in outlying parishes and Democratic white paramilitary forces in New Orleans kept thousands of blacks from voting in the fall 1868 presidential election. As a result, Democratic candidate for President Horatio Seymour carried Louisiana, although his Republican opponent Ulysses S. Grant carried the country.

Because of the reported fraud and coercion, Warmoth created a State Returning Board, to certify future elections. All election returns were reported to the State Returning Board for validity and approval. At the same time, the governor augmented the military forces at his command: a 5,000-man state militia and a Metropolitan Police force, with authority over the greater New Orleans area where the state government was then based.

Warmoth also sought to broaden the Republican Party to include a larger share of the propertied white class. He supported government aid for railroad construction and levee repair, called for and got a constitutional amendment limiting the state's ability to go into debt, and vetoed pork barrel bills. At his recommendation, the voters removed the provisions in the Reconstruction constitution that had temporarily disenfranchised a portion of the former Confederates. Warmoth appointed some former Confederates to office, notably General James Longstreet. When he had a choice, Warmoth chose white applicants over black ones.

Warmoth's 1868 inaugural address expressed his support for the recently passed Thirteenth and Fourteenth Amendments, pledging "equality before the law and the enjoyment of every political right of all the citizens of the state, regardless of race, color, or previous condition." He argued for the amendments to be supported by legislation that had popular as well as legislative support:

only when this grand distinctive feature of the new constitution shall be stamped on every act of legislation, and when such legislation shall find approval and support in that general public sentiment which gives to law its vitality, will our State fairly enter upon that career of greatness and prosperity which the almighty designed for her.

Warmoth signed a weak bill to integrate access to public facilities, but he vetoed a more extensive one that would penalize owners of public places and vehicles who failed to provide equal service to blacks and whites. Historian Francis Byers Harris thought his veto of the public accommodations bill was crucial in eroding his political base. Harris wrote in 1947, "Negroes had their hearts set on this law, and Warmoth sowed a seed of distrust which grew into enmity for the man they had helped elect."

In consequence, Republicans developed severe internal conflicts. A division arose between the Warmoth-Pinchback faction, supported by many Creoles of color who had been free before the war, and what was called the Custom House faction, led by Stephen B. Packard, a US Marshal, and James F. Casey, Collector of the Port of New Orleans and brother-in-law to President Grant. Although Warmoth had helped William Pitt Kellogg gain legislative election as a US Senator, he became allied with Packard, as did Oscar Dunn, lieutenant governor and African-American leader of many Republican ward clubs in New Orleans.

By 1871, every local convention turned into a fracas. The Custom House wing of the Republican Party took control of the state convention, enforced by state militia. Warmoth's supporters had to assemble in a convention of their own. That winter, the governor seized control of the statehouse from his opponents by using the state militia forces outfitted with bayonets for protection. Warmoth's leadership was strained.

Believing that President Grant supported his enemies, Warmoth joined the Liberal Republican Party that was seeking a reform candidate for president. When it endorsed Horace Greeley and the Democrats adopted Greeley as their presidential candidate, the governor carried his influence to Greeley's side. In state politics, that meant endorsing the Fusionist-Democratic ticket of John McEnery in the 1872 gubernatorial election. Such a step alienated Warmoth from any black Republican support that he still had, including that of Pinchback. None of them trusted Democrats to protect equal rights, whatever the politicians professed. Fraud and violence accompanied the election, and its results were contested.

Both McEnery and William Pitt Kellogg, the official Republican candidate, declared victory and held inaugurations. The Warmoth-appointed Returning Board declared McEnery as victor. Republicans established a separate Returning Board, which certified Kellogg.

Ultimately, Grant supported Kellogg's Republican candidacy. The Republican-controlled legislature filed impeachment charges against Warmoth for his actions during the 1872 election. Only 35 days before the end of his term, he was suspended from office, as called for by Louisiana law for impeached officials, pending the outcome of a state senate trial. Pinchback was sworn in and became the second acting African-American governor in US history. With the end of Warmoth's term soon reached, Warmoth was allowed to leave office and no impeachment trial was held.

== After Reconstruction ==
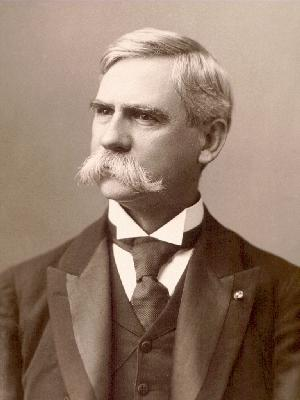
Henry Clay Warmoth, later in life

In 1877, at age 35, Warmoth married heiress Sally Durand of Newark, New Jersey. They had two sons and a daughter, and resided at Magnolia Plantation in Plaquemines Parish. Warmoth had bought the sugar cane plantation in 1873. Warmoth helped establish a sugar refinery and get a railroad constructed along the west bank of the Mississippi, which contributed to the development of the area.

He represented the Sugar Planters Association in seeking a tariff against foreign competition, which they gained from Congress. Louisiana planters could not compete against outside sugar. In 1884, Warmoth traveled to France and Germany to study their sugar industries, and he developed an experimental station at his plantation afterward. Unable to compete with foreign sugar, Warmoth sold his plantation and moved with his wife and family to New Orleans.

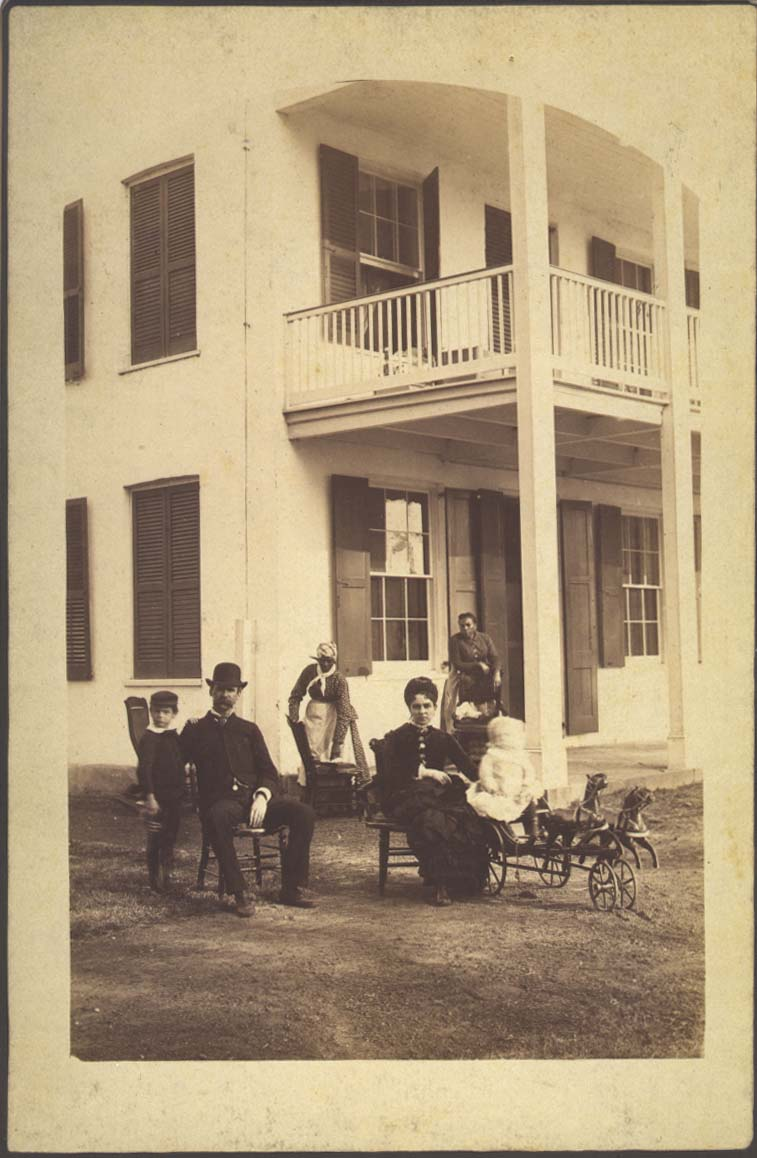
Warmoth with family and servants at the Magnolia Plantation in Plaquemines Parish

In 1888, Warmoth ran for and lost a race for Governor to Francis T. Nicholls, a Democrat and former governor, in an election accompanied by extensive voter fraud. In 1890, Warmoth was appointed US Collector of Customs in New Orleans by President Benjamin Harrison. In turn he used his patronage appointments to select many men from among the Afro-Creole community, who had supported him politically. During his service, Warmoth lived in the St. Charles Hotel.

In 1889, the white Democrat-dominated legislature passed a constitutional amendment incorporating a "grandfather clause", which effectively disenfranchised most blacks in the state. Not being able to vote also excluded them from juries and local office. The Democrats essentially maintained this exclusion until after passage by Congress of the Voting Rights Act of 1965, which authorized the federal government to oversee and enforce the constitutional right of all citizens to vote.

Warmoth published his memoir, War, Politics and Reconstruction, in 1930. It is well regarded and considered a classic of the genre. Warmoth died in New Orleans in 1931, aged 89.

== In popular culture ==
A New Orleans service industry writer and Quarter Rat columnist took the name "Henry Warmoth" as a pseudonym.

Party political offices
Preceded by James Madison Wells	Republican nominee for Governor of Louisiana; 1868	Succeeded by William Pitt Kellogg
Preceded by John Stevenson	Republican nominee for Governor of Louisiana; 1888	Succeeded by Albert Leonard
Political offices
Preceded by Joshua Baker	Governor of Louisiana; 1868–1872	Succeeded by P. B. S. Pinchback
