= February 2007 North American blizzard =

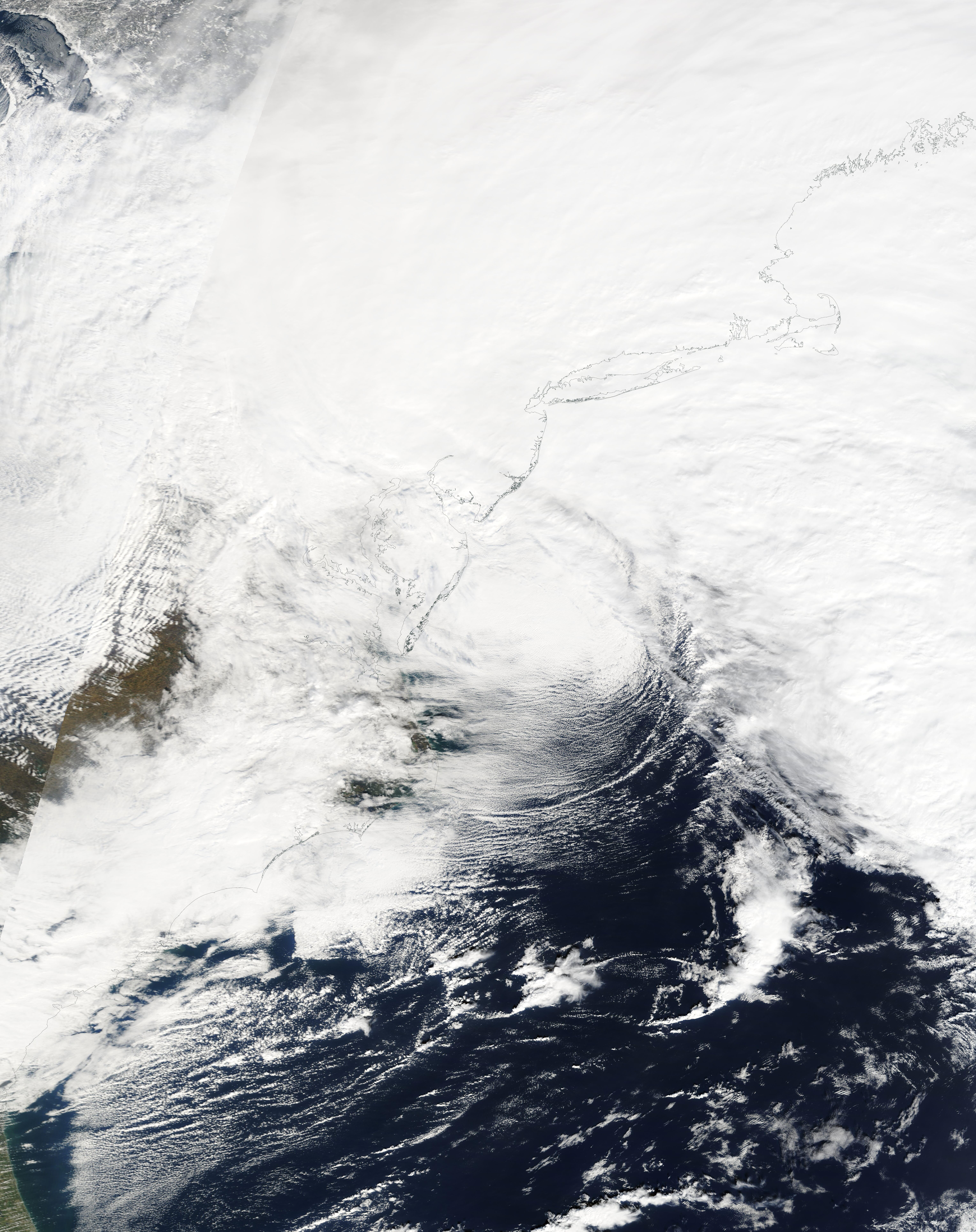
- The winter storm responsible for the blizzard off the U.S. East Coast on February 14

Meteorological history
- Formed: February 12, 2007
- Dissipated: February 17, 2007

Category 3 "Major" blizzard
- Regional snowfall index: 8.90 (NOAA)
- Lowest pressure: 970 mbar (hPa); 28.64 inHg
- Max. snowfall: 48 in (120 cm) Stowe, Vermont, U.S.

Tornado outbreak
- Tornadoes: 19
- Max. rating: EF2 tornado

Overall effects
- Fatalities: 37 (1 tornadic)
- Damage: $58.32 million (2007 USD)
- Areas affected: Midwestern and Eastern North America, Gulf States
- Part of the 2006–07 North American winter

The February 2007 North American blizzard was a massive winter storm that affected most of the eastern half of North America, starting on February 12, 2007, and peaking on Valentine's Day, February 14. The storm produced heavy snowfalls across the midwestern United States from Nebraska to Ohio and produced similar conditions across parts of the northeastern United States, and into Canada in Ontario, Quebec and New Brunswick. Significant sleet and freezing rain fell across the southern Ohio Valley and affected portions of the east coast of the United States, including the cities of Boston, Baltimore, Washington, D.C., New York City and Philadelphia.

The southern portion of the storm produced severe thunderstorms with numerous tornadoes reported. One tornado hit a subdivision of New Orleans that was still recovering from the effects of Hurricane Katrina in August 2005. In total, this storm system was responsible for 37 deaths across 13 U.S. states and Canadian provinces of New Brunswick, Ontario and Quebec. The NOAA classified the storm as a Category 3 "Major" storm. The National Weather Service has determined that this storm was one of the three largest snowstorms to hit the inland areas of the northeastern United States since 1940.

== Prior to the storm ==
In sharp contrast to the mostly mild weather in the first few weeks of winter, the eastern half of the continent was under the influence of cold temperatures. Numerous areas had substantial snowfall deficits before this storm. After several weak Alberta clippers crossed the eastern half of the continent and brought occasional light snowfalls, a large dip in the Northern branch of the jet stream favored a more active pattern, which, as it connected with the southern branch, led to the development of the storm.

An area of low pressure tracked across southeastern Canada during the 12th, which brought an arctic front across the Mid Atlantic region late on the 12th. As this occurred, a strong area of high pressure located across central Canada built down into the Northeast, allowing very cold air to spill southward ultimately leading to what is known as cold air damming. This occurs east of the mountains down through the Mid Atlantic states. Meanwhile, a Pacific storm slammed onto the California coast during the 11th and as it moved eastward, a new area of low pressure developed across southeastern Colorado and the Texas Panhandle.

Previously, portions of the Great Lakes were hit by a significant lake effect snow event which dumped incredible amounts of snow over portions of central New York. Several areas received over 115 inches (2,900 mm) of snow in a ten-day period just before the large winter storm as northwesterly winds and unfrozen lake surfaces due to the early winter warm weather favored the heavy snowfall. Several areas across Michigan and Ontario also received significant amounts of snow with locally 1 metre (3 ft 3 in) of snow east of Georgian Bay in Ontario.

== Storm track ==
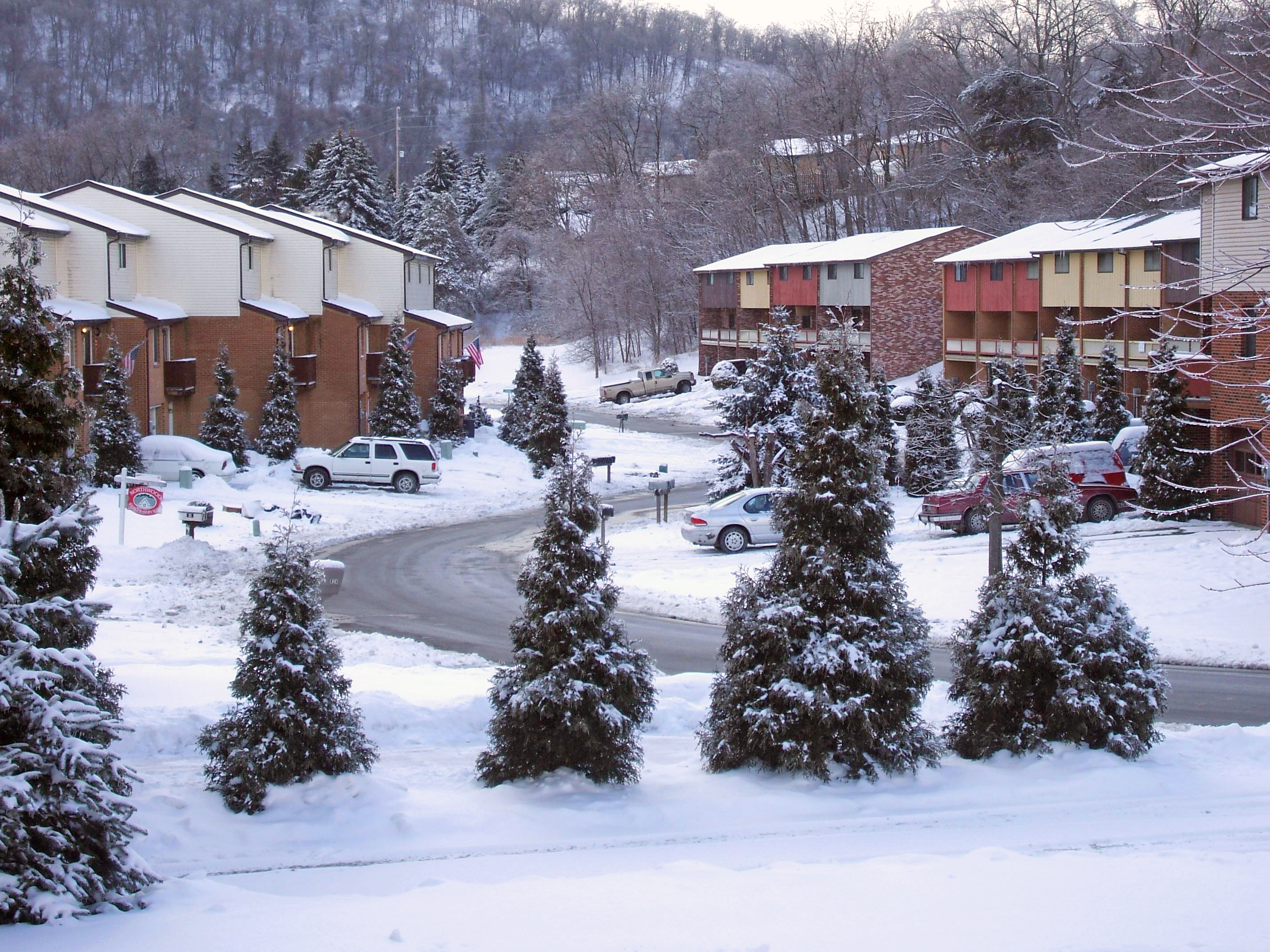
Snow coverage in Shaler Township, Pennsylvania, a suburb of Pittsburgh

From February 10 to 11, a low pressure system developed near the Rockies and moved towards the Great Plains of the United States. It later tracked across the Ohio Valley and merged with a new coastal low. It then moved over eastern Quebec on February 14 before exiting northeastern Quebec and Newfoundland and Labrador on February 16. It dumped over 6 inches (150 mm) of snow across numerous areas from Iowa to New Brunswick, including major cities such as Akron, Detroit, Champaign–Urbana, Chicago, Cleveland, Columbus, Springfield, Peoria, Indianapolis, Fort Wayne, Dayton, Toledo, Cincinnati, London, Hamilton, the Niagara Region, Toronto, Sherbrooke, Saguenay, Trois-Rivières, Ottawa, Montreal, Quebec City, Pittsburgh, Buffalo, Rochester, Windsor, Syracuse and Albany. This also includes areas such as Northern Oswego County, New York, which received historic lake effect snowfall amounts in the week prior to the storm.

In addition to the snowfall, snow squalls coming from Lake Ontario gave local amounts of over 2 feet (0.61 m) of snow near the Hamilton and Niagara regions, where 1 foot (0.30 m) of snow had already fallen on February 13.

Heavy ice amounts fell for locations along Interstate 95 from Maine to Virginia and west towards southern Ohio and Indiana. Ice was expected for parts of the Canadian Maritimes.

This storm became impressive as it moved into the Ohio Valley during the 13th. However, as additional energy moved into the eastern part of the country, a new area of low pressure developed near the North Carolina coast late on the 13th. This allowed mainly light snow to overspread the region from south to north during the early morning hours of the 13th. Low pressure developed in the southern Plains on Monday the 12th as a cold front pushed southward across the Northeast. By Tuesday the 13th, the storm moved eastward across the lower Mississippi Valley while the cold front became stationary in the Carolinas. On the night of the 13th, the primary low moved into the far eastern Ohio Valley while a secondary low developed on the stalled front in the Carolinas. During the day on Wednesday the 14th, this secondary low strengthened rapidly and moved northeastward along the mid-Atlantic and New England coasts while the primary low dissipated in the central Appalachians. By Thursday the 15th, the storm had moved into eastern Canada.

== Impact ==
=== States of emergency and mobilizations ===
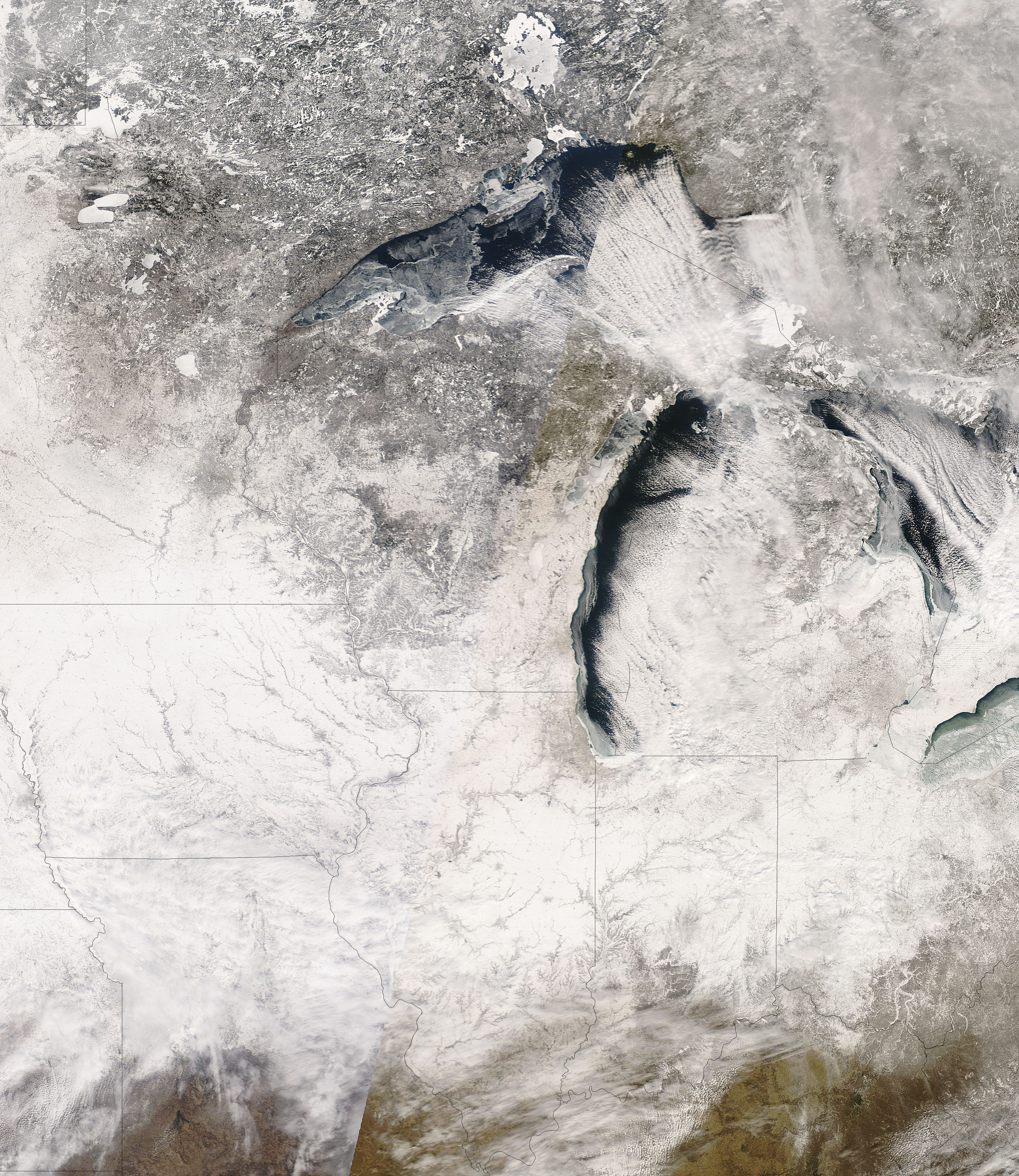
A NASA satellite image of the Great Lakes states after the snowfall

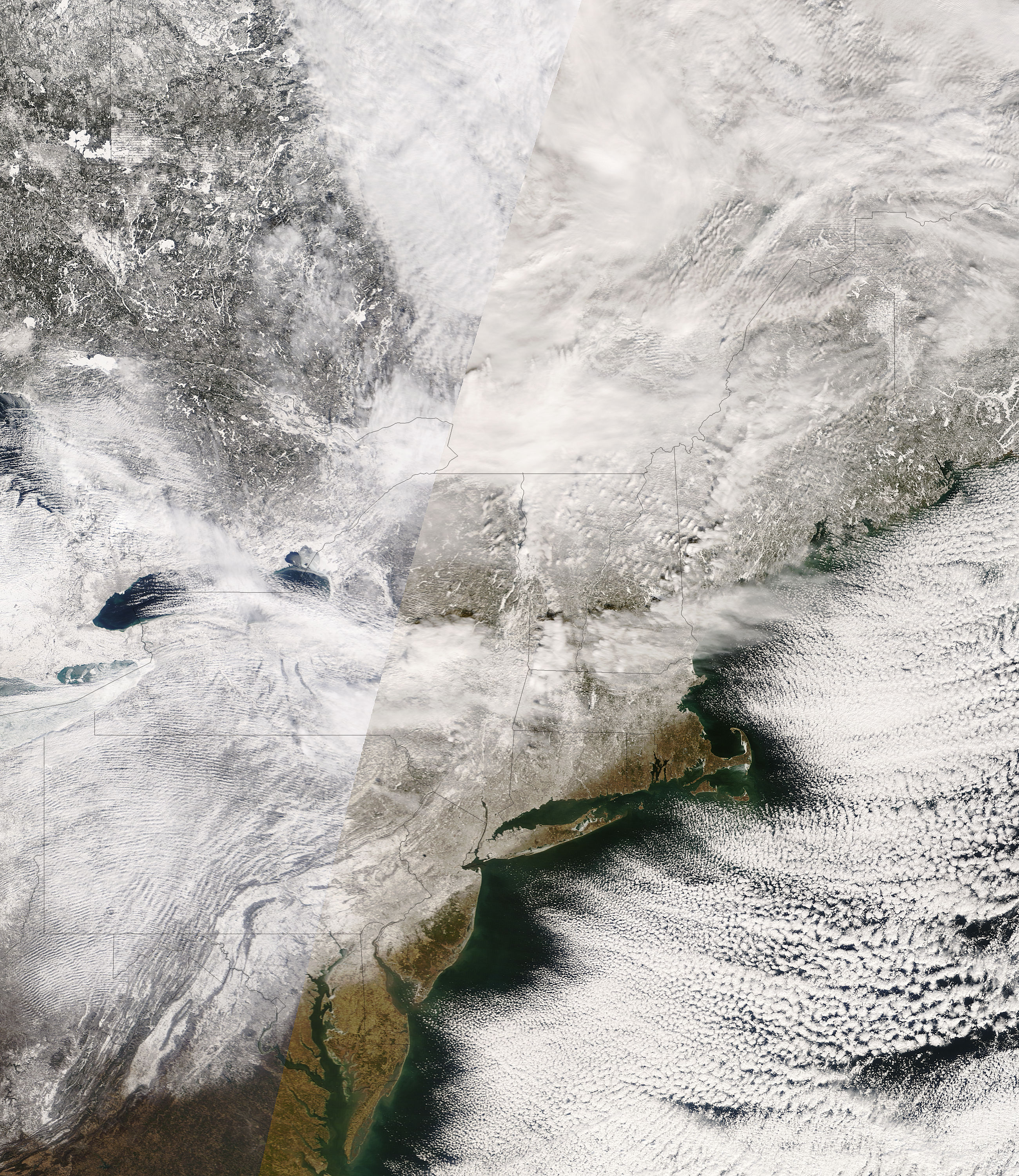
A NASA satellite image of the New England region coated in snow after the storm

Maine Governor John Baldacci declared a state of emergency in order to assure heating oil for residents of the state, which was one of the hardest hit areas by the snowstorm.

Due to the additional heavy snowfall, New York Governor Eliot Spitzer called in the National Guard to assist in the snow removal efforts in the areas hit by the lake effect snow storm.

In Pennsylvania, Governor Ed Rendell declared a disaster emergency across the entire state on the 15th. PPL Electric Utilities Corporation reported 1,542 customers were without power for a time during the storm in the Lancaster, Harrisburg and Allentown areas. Snow began across between 6 AM and 7 AM EST on the 13th in Philadelphia, Delaware, Chester, Montgomery and Berks counties. The snow then overspread Bucks, Northampton, Lehigh, Carbon, Berks, and most of Schuylkill counties between 8 AM and 10 AM EST, but held off in Monroe County until the early afternoon hours. There was a lull in the precipitation during the evening hours of the 13th especially across southeastern Pennsylvania, however the precipitation became widespread overnight and during the early morning hours of the 14th.

As some warmer air began to move in above the surface, the snow mixed with and changed to sleet and freezing rain between 6 PM and 7 PM EST on the 13th in Philadelphia and Delaware Counties, then between 7 PM and 11 PM across most other areas in eastern Pennsylvania. The southern Poconos saw less mixed precipitation, however there was a period of mixed precipitation between about 7:30 PM on the 13th and 11:30 AM on the 14th. For a brief time during the afternoon of the 14th, temperatures rose a couple of degrees above freezing with no precipitation falling. Temperatures then dropped below freezing again by the late afternoon of the 14th with a period of snow before the precipitation came to an end between 8:30 PM and 10 PM on the 14th. Wraparound snow showers lingered in Monroe and Carbon Counties until 2 AM EST on the 15th.

In Berks County, snow and sleet along with very cold temperatures combined with some accidents and other aspects to cause a 50-mile backup on Interstate 78. Many motorists, including more than 100 trucks, were stuck on the interstate for nearly 24 hours, without food, water and running out of fuel. At 12:26 PM on the 14th, a caller tells a 911 center he's been stuck in traffic on westbound Interstate 78 near the Berks-Lehigh county line for more than an hour. At 1:02 PM, a truck driver tells the Berks Communications Center about a seven-mile backup on the eastbound lanes of Interstate 78 near Hamburg. At 4:40 PM, a 911 caller asked to speak to the Berks Emergency Management Agency. The Berks Deputy Coordinator took the call. At 4:59 PM, The Berks Deputy Coordinator called the State Emergency Operations Center and was told the center learned of the backup at 4:33 PM. At 5:22 PM, Berks Emergency Management calls the state police at the Hamburg barracks but cannot get through, so he decided to drive there. At 6:08 PM, the Berks Emergency Management Deputy Coordinator finds that the Hamburg barracks is without power and phones. At 6:27 PM, a senior decision-maker from PennDOT is requested to arrive at the Hamburg state police barracks to help with communications. At 9:30 PM, a PennDOT supervisor arrived in Hamburg.

At 10:30 PM, all westbound Interstate 78 traffic is stopped at the Hamburg exit due to numerous disabled vehicles. At 10:40 PM, Governor Ed Rendell declared a disaster emergency. On the 15th at 3:54 AM, state troopers and emergency personnel began walking miles of Interstate 78, waking up truckers who have gone to sleep as traffic begins to move. At 5 PM on the 15th, the state orders Interstate 78 shut down in both directions from Interstate 81 in Lebanon County to Route 100 in Lehigh County. At 6 PM on the 15th, plowing begins and continued through the night. Additional snow removing equipment was brought in from the western part of the state to help with the clearing of the highway. Highway officials along with the National Guard and State Police worked to clear the stuck trucks and cars from the highway, therefore plowing and ice removal can get fully underway. On the 16th, the interstate remained closed throughout the day as crews continued to plow and remove ice. On the 17th at 4 PM, the interstate reopened.

The Exeter Township snow emergency, which was declared on the 14th, was extended through 4 PM on the 15th. Several schools across the county were closed on the 14th, with some also closed on the 15th. Across the Lehigh Valley: In Lehigh County, The city of Allentown declared a snow emergency early on the 14th, which was then lifted at 8 PM on the 14th. The weight of snow and ice, on the 14th, brought down the dome over the swimming pool at the West End Racquet and Fitness Club in South Whitehall Township. The dome itself was destroyed. Also, the Brookside Country Club in Wescosville also reported dome damage as a result of the snow and ice. In Northampton County, an 83-year-old woman was found dead on the rear porch of her home from hypothermia. Also in Bethlehem, a pedestrian was hospitalized after a private snowplow operator backed over him while clearing the Sheetz gas station parking lot at 3201 Schoenersville Road on the 14th. County Emergency Dispatch officials reported about a dozen or so minor vehicle accidents due to the slippery conditions. The snow and ice was too much on the 15th for a dome covering a soccer field at the Iron Lakes Sports Club on Shankweiler Road in North Whitehall that it collapsed.

In the Poconos, in Carbon County, The Mansion Hill (SR 209) exiting Jim Thorpe towards Lehighton was closed for most of the 14th due to snow slides blocking the major artery or tractor-trailer trucks becoming stuck and blocking the travel lanes. The road reopened about 2:30 PM on the 14th, however it was shut down again at 3:06 PM due to an accident. This was a main trouble spot as the snow and sleet reportedly drifted on the hill across part of the highway. Drifts were reported to be higher than some vehicles. At 8:20 AM on the 14th, it was decided that drifting was occurring more frequently than road crews could clear, resulting in the heavily traveled road being closed. All schools in the county canceled classes as early as the evening of the 13th. Lansford continued their state of emergency on the 15th, which was issued on the 14th. This means that all non-essential travel should be avoided. One accident occurred when a tractor-trailer jack-knifed on the Mansion House Hill, Route 209, in Jim Thorpe at about 4 AM on the 14th. The Pennsylvania Turnpikes Lehighton interchange was closed because of a tractor-trailer crash on the 14th, and state police closed Interstate 81 late in the afternoon of the 14th, deeming it impassable. Interstate 380 also was closed because of bad road conditions.

In Monroe County, state police closed Interstates 80 and 380 during the afternoon of the 14th because of bad road conditions. Interstate 80 was closed between Interstates 81 and 380. The combination of a heavy snowfall then a mix of sleet, snow and freezing rain made for hazardous road conditions. The mixed precipitation made it more difficult for some road crews to keep up. At 4 PM EST on the 17th the interstates reopened after ice was removed and the road surfaces was safe for travel. In and around the Greater Philadelphia metropolitan area, in Bucks County, slippery road conditions contributed to a tractor-trailer accident on the 14th on Route 309 in Richland Township. The highway was closed for more than an hour, which forced motorists to detour on slush-covered side streets.

In Philadelphia itself, the combination of snow and sleet closed many of the schools, delayed flights, trains and buses. The school district parochial schools were closed on the 14th, as were the regional and central administrative offices. During the midday hours on the 14th, giant slabs of ice slid off tops of buildings in Center City and crashed to the ground. Chunks of ice as large as three feet wide made their way to the pavement from high up. Police started to block off areas where the ice was falling, however one man was hit in the head by the falling ice and was knocked to the ground.

Schenectady, Schoharie, Montgomery, Washington, Essex, Warren and Clinton counties in New York state, which were affected by extensive snowfall from the storm, had declared a state of emergency while several other counties and towns declared snow emergencies.

Virginia Gov. Timothy Kaine declared a statewide emergency in advance of the storm, directing state agencies to help in the response to and recovery from the storm.

Pennsylvania Gov. Ed Rendell declared a statewide disaster emergency in response to the poor road conditions and ensuing highway closings.

=== Precipitation received ===
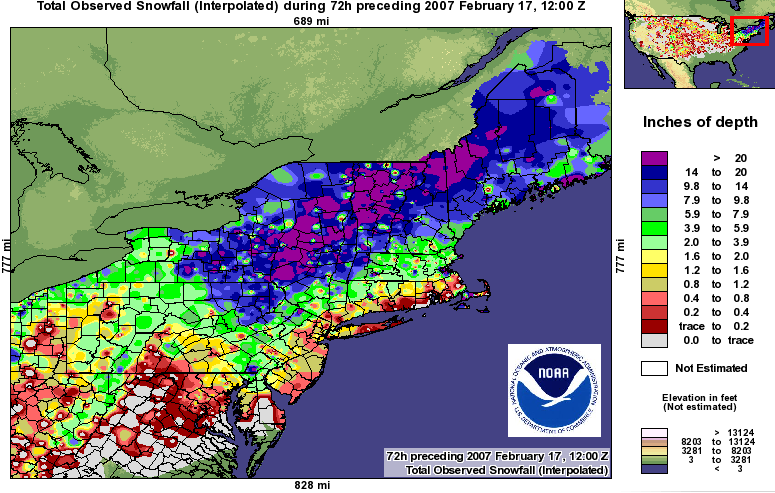
February 2007 North America Winter Storm snowfall accumulation for the Northeastern United States, according to the National Weather Service

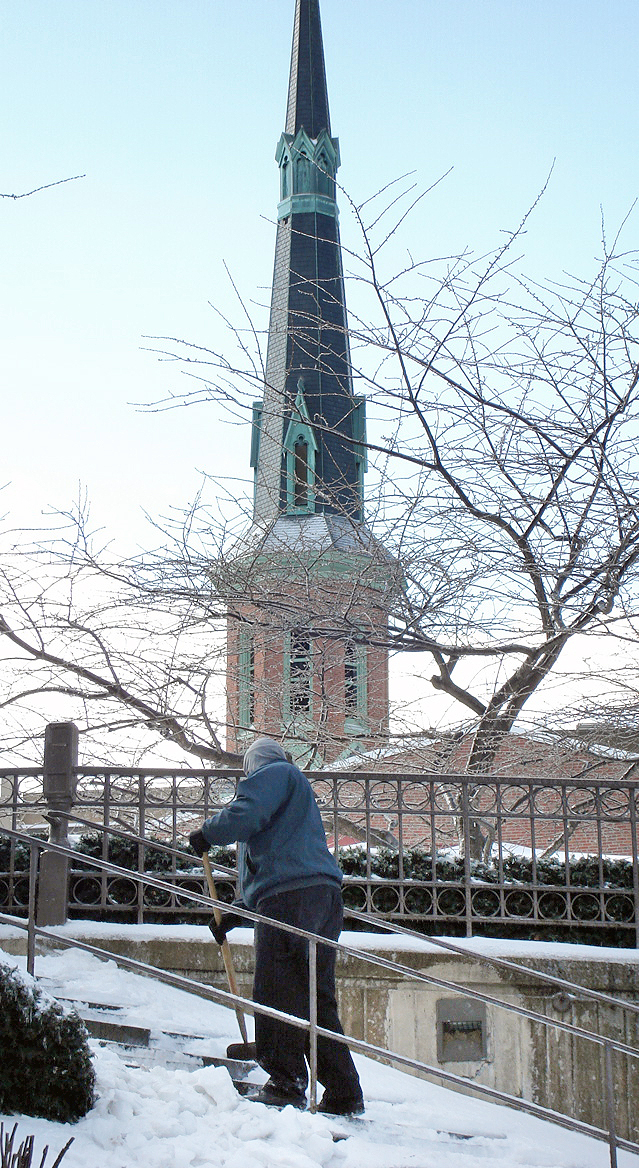
Removing ice from the steps of the Harrisburg Transportation Center in Harrisburg, Pennsylvania

The storm left a mark on Illinois, Indiana, and Ohio, which received heavy snow for over 24 hours, accumulating upwards of 18 inches (460 mm) in some areas. Many parts of Northern and Northeastern Indiana received between 12 and 20 inches (300 and 510 mm), and blizzard conditions for an extended period of time. The heavy snow and blizzard conditions caused roads to close, and schools and businesses to close for three days. In Chicago, O'Hare International Airport received 10.2 inches (260 mm) of snow, while Midway Airport received 12 inches (300 mm). The Midway total was the largest amount of snow received in the month of February for one midnight-to-midnight day since records began to be kept in 1928. In central Illinois, 12 to 16 inches (300 to 410 mm) of snowfall and blizzard conditions canceled classes at the University of Illinois at Urbana–Champaign for two days, the first time classes had been canceled since 1979.

Areas of the Appalachian Mountains in northern New England and Quebec received accumulations of over 16 inches (410 mm) with local amount exceeding 36 inches (910 mm) in parts of Vermont and 42 inches (1,100 mm) in the Adirondacks in New York state. Also in New York state, in the hills and valleys south of Syracuse, snowfall depths ranged from 24 to 45 inches (610 to 1,140 mm). Snowfall rates of 5 to 6 inches (130 to 150 mm) per hour occurred in areas of western Schoharie County, with total storm accumulations in this county approaching three feet. The city of Hamilton, Ontario and the Niagara region, at their highest elevations, received just over 27.6 inches (700 mm) due to snow squalls off of Lake Ontario. Burlington, Vermont recorded record 24-hour snowfall, with 25.3 inches (640 mm). Boston and Hartford, however, saw very little precipitation from the storm. In fact, Boston is close to setting a record for the least snow in any season.

A notable feature of the system was its array of precipitation type. While the interior sections of the Northeast received mostly snow from the system, the Mid-Atlantic received snow, sleet, freezing rain and non-freezing rain. Due to the three-dimensional nature of the atmosphere, warm air was poised to overtake the cold air closer to the ground, causing precipitation to melt, then refreeze as either sleet or freezing rain. As temperatures hovered around freezing on the southern edge of the storm track, light snow accompanied freezing rain and sleet. The freezing rain coated all surfaces with thick layers of ice, including power lines and tree limbs which break under the additional weight. Some locations in the Mid-Atlantic received several inches of sleet. four inches (100 mm) of sleet caused travel difficulties and hampered cleanup efforts in New York City. New York City's sanitation department admitted to not plowing city streets, expecting the frozen precipitation to change from ice to rain. However, this never happened. Instead, temperatures dropped very quickly and caused the slush on sidewalks and roads to freeze into thick, rock hard sheets of ice. Streets were almost impassable during the evening rush hour resulting in complete chaos. Along coastal New England, a mix of rain, sleet, and freezing rain resulted in decreased snow amounts in coastal areas of New England.in coastal Maine, snowfall amounts were restricted to 6 to 12 inches (150 to 300 mm), while inland sections of the state got as much as 29.8 inches (760 mm) of snow.

Ice accumulations in Virginia and Maryland reached locally 3/4 inch (19 mm) while it reached 1 inch (25 mm) in central Ohio near Columbus and Xenia, with up to 0.7 inches (18 mm) near Cincinnati.

The effect on much of Michigan by the storm was light, although the extreme southern part of the state was hard hit with heavy snowfall, especially the Detroit Metro area. Wind whipped snow accumulations ranged from 7 to 10 inches (180 to 250 mm) fell throughout the area, especially the southeastern suburbs, including 8.5 inches (220 mm) at both Detroit Metropolitan Airport and Wyandotte, and 8.4 inches (210 mm) in Dundee. Drifts were as high as 2 to 3 feet (0.61 to 0.91 m), and the snow was very powdery as it fell with temperatures around 10 °F (−12 °C).

Due to the near-record amounts of snow in the Appalachian Mountain chain, National Weather Service officials had issued statement for a higher risk of avalanches across northern New England.

=== Damage and travel disruptions ===
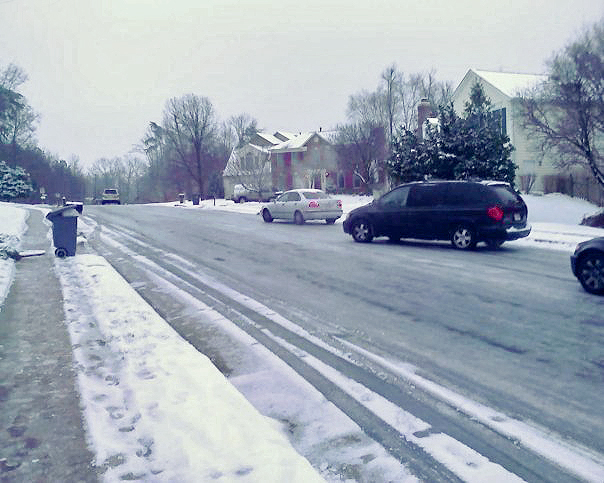
Cars unable to ascend a slope in Northern Virginia due to icy conditions

Blizzard conditions were reported across most of the Midwest from Illinois to Ohio. Numerous flights were canceled due to the snow and ice across various airports including in Toronto, Ottawa, Quebec City, Montreal, Kansas City, Indianapolis, St. Louis, Cleveland, Boston and Cincinnati. 900 flights were canceled at Chicago's O'Hare International Airport.

Lackawanna County and Luzerne County in Northeastern Pennsylvania received so much snow that every highway was closed.

At John F. Kennedy International Airport in Queens in New York City, several empty JetBlue airplanes were frozen to the parking stands at the gates and incoming flights could not access the stands as a result, while outgoing flights already taxiing were ordered to hold on the taxiway due to weather conditions. Many passengers in planes, either inbound or outbound, were held in the planes, eating peanuts and other snacks for as much as 10 hours before the decision was made to cancel the outgoing flights or a gate had opened for the inbound ones.

Several other airports, including Bradley International Airport in Windsor Locks, Connecticut, Ronald Reagan Washington National Airport in Crystal City, Virginia, and John C. Munro Hamilton International Airport in Hamilton, Ontario, suspended all flights for several hours. GO Train in Toronto and Amtrak train service from Boston was also disrupted. In Scranton, Pennsylvania the Toyota Pavilion at Montage Mountain collapsed under the weight of the snow on February 15, 2007. Strong winds also accompanied the storm but damage was minimal, though a radio tower pole was toppled by 40 mph (64 km/h) winds in Ohio.

Road traveling was extensively slowed down and numerous accidents and pile-ups were reported across several states and in Ontario. One of the accidents on the Ohio Turnpike involved two tractor-trailers which fell several hundred feet, and another one on Highway 403 in Hamilton involved three tractor-trailers and five cars which forced the closure of the road. Numerous other major roads were also temporarily shutdown, including Highway 401 in Ontario due to a fatal accident in Napanee and Autoroute 20 and Route 132 in eastern Quebec between Quebec City and Rimouski.

In Sherbrooke, Quebec, where nearly 2 feet (0.61 m) of snow fell, several hundred students were forced to sleep at schools as buses were unable to travel in the near blizzard conditions. The school board was criticized for opening schools on that day.

Severe ice caused a 50-mile (80 km) stretch of Interstate 78 in Pennsylvania between Lebanon County and Allentown to be shut down, stranding motorists for upwards of 24 hours and requiring the National Guard to be called in. Other stretches of highway throughout Pennsylvania were shut down, including Interstate 80, 81, and after the storm, even the Pennsylvania Turnpike. On February 16, Governor Ed Rendell called for a thorough investigation into how the state handled the winter weather emergency, citing a lack of communication and quick action as the cause of the problems, and even going so far as to taking responsibility for the situation.

=== Deaths ===
Thirty-seven people were killed during the storm and its aftermath. Most of them were killed in motor vehicle accidents, including one in Ontario, three in Nebraska, two in New York, two in Illinois, two in New Jersey, two in Indiana, two in Delaware, one in New Brunswick, five in Quebec, one in Louisiana, one in New Hampshire, six in Vermont, one in Missouri, one in Pennsylvania, one in Virginia, and six in Ohio. In addition to traffic accidents, fatalities were reported due to tornadoes, heart attacks while shoveling, roof collapses due to heavy snow, falling tree branches and carbon monoxide poisoning. In Quebec City, a 16-year-old boy disappeared during the snowstorm and was found dead three days later in a snow bank.

=== Schools ===
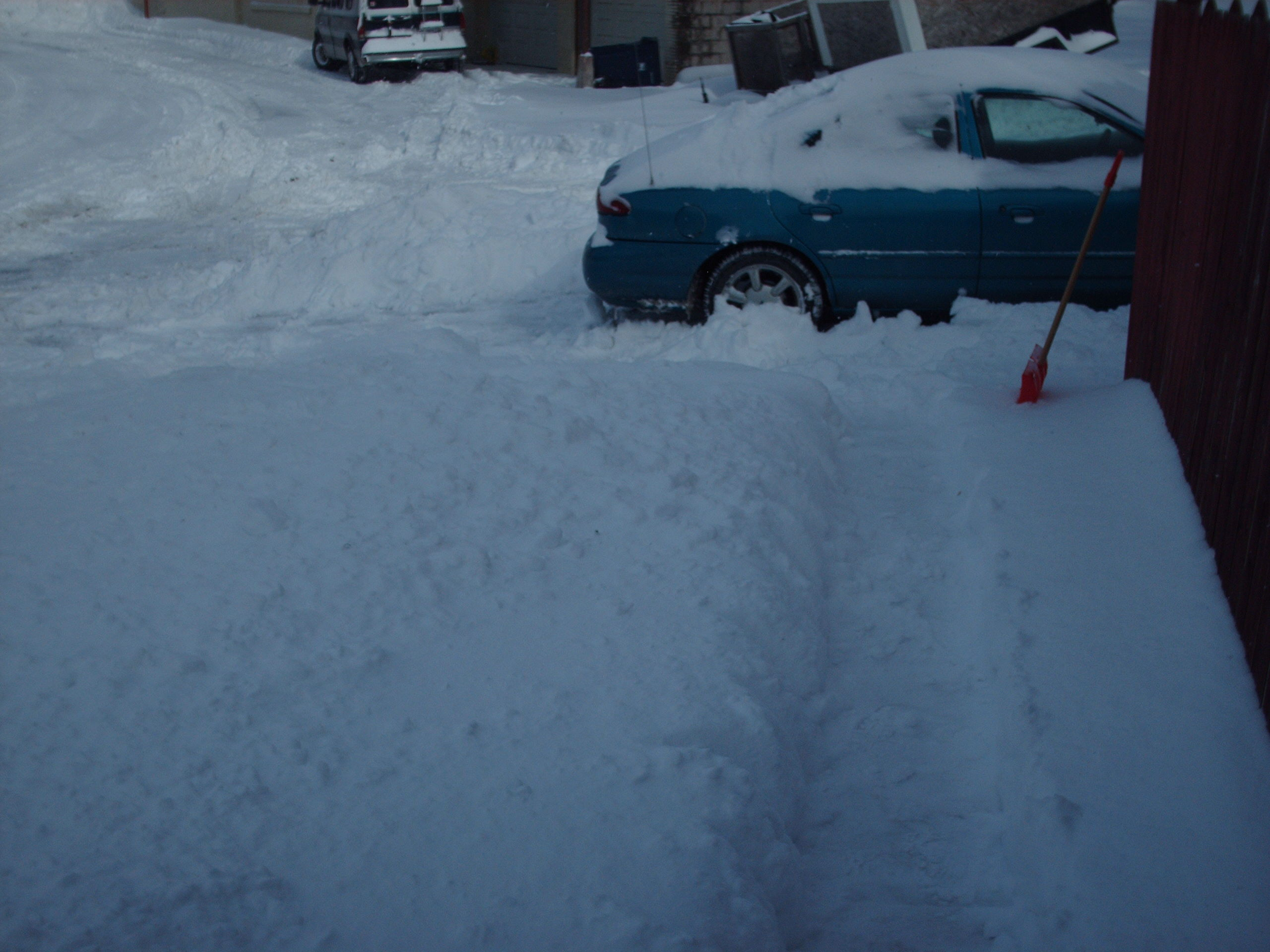
Mansfield, Ohio paralyzed by 17 inches (430 mm) of snow

The inclement weather caused many educational institutions, such as universities and secondary schools, to close. Among these were University of Michigan–Dearborn in Dearborn, Michigan, Ball State University in Muncie, Indiana, College of Mount St. Joseph in Cincinnati, Ohio, Western Illinois University in Macomb, Illinois, Eastern Illinois University in Charleston, Illinois, Champlain College and the University of Vermont in Burlington, Vermont, Mount St. Mary's University in Emmitsburg, Maryland, Illinois State University in Normal, Illinois, Western Connecticut State University in Danbury, Connecticut, Oberlin College in Oberlin, Ohio, The University of Akron, Kent State University, Ohio Northern University in Ada, Ohio, Baldwin-Wallace College in Berea, Ohio, The University of Toledo in Toledo, Ohio, the University at Albany, Rensselaer Polytechnic Institute, Case Western Reserve University in Cleveland, The Pennsylvania State University, Lyndon State College in Lyndonville, Vermont, George Mason University, Northern Virginia Community College and James Madison University in Virginia, Sherbrooke University and Bishop's University, in Quebec, the University of Maryland in College Park, Maryland, UMBC in Catonsville, Maryland, Georgetown University in Washington, D.C., Cornell University, University of Pittsburgh, Chatham College in Pittsburgh, and West Chester University. Tornado damage, rather than snow fall, caused Tulane University to cancel classes.

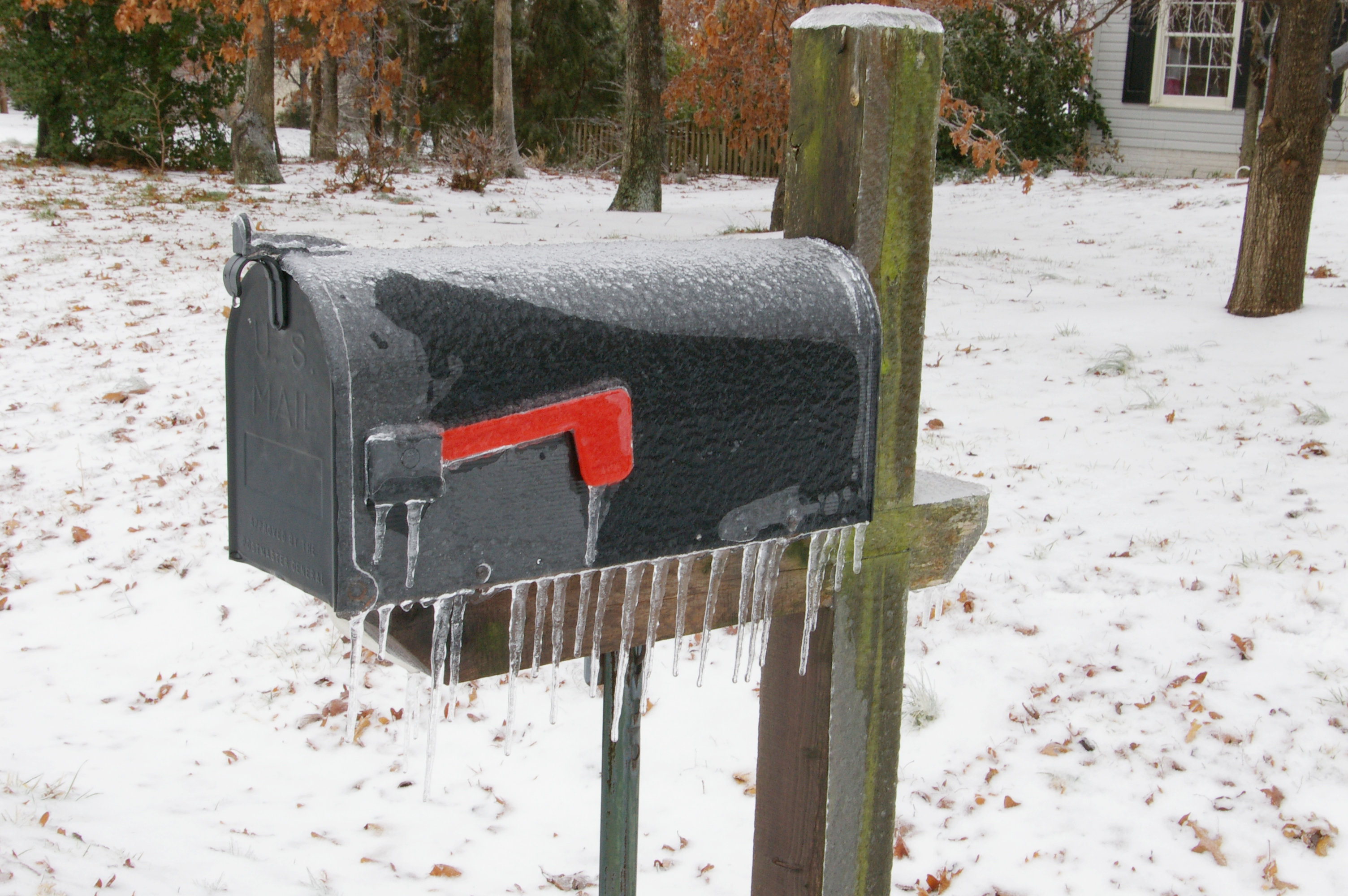
An ice-covered mailbox near Fredericksburg, Virginia demonstrates how freezing rain along the storm's southern track left surfaces coated with ice.

Several elementary, middle, and high schools were closed three days in a row in central New York. Public schools in the "W Towns" in eastern Massachusetts (Weston, Wayland, and Wellesley) did have school that day despite the fact that almost every other town in the state had the day off. Several schools' classes were canceled after years without a snow day. Dartmouth College shut down campus operations on February 14. Essential employees remained staffed, and classes were held at professors' discretion. It was the first snow day for the college since the 1970s, and its second in its 238-year history.

Ohio State University in Columbus, Ohio closed its campus for two days, beginning February 13, for the third time in 25 years. Syracuse University canceled all classes after 12:45 pm on Wednesday, closing for only the third time in its 130-year history; for SUNY Geneseo, the previous snow day had occurred 14 years ago; for Ithaca College, the first time in 13 years; for the University of Toledo, the first time in 22 years due to winter-related conditions. The University of Illinois canceled their classes for two consecutive days for the first time in at least 27 years. A blizzard warning forced Purdue University to suspend classes for the first time in 13 years. SUNY Oneonta closed its doors for the first time since the 1970s, and stayed closed for 3 days for the first time in its 119-year history. Hartwick College had its first recorded snow day in its 230-year history, and stayed closed for 2 days. For the first time in six years, Youngstown State University in Youngstown, Ohio canceled classes as a result of the snow. On February 14, for only the third time in school history, Bucknell University in Lewisburg, Pennsylvania canceled classes as a result of the snow. Susquehanna University in nearby Selinsgrove, however, remained open with no official cancellations.

=== Other closings ===
Legislative meetings in Ohio and Pennsylvania were also affected due to the bad weather. In Pittsburgh, tourist sites such as the zoo and aquarium were closed. In New Hampshire, presidential candidate Mitt Romney (R) was forced to cancel a campaign appearance. A global warming hearing in the U.S. House of Representatives' Subcommittee on Energy and Air Quality scheduled for February 14 and a showing of the film An Inconvenient Truth at Maryville University in St. Louis were also cancelled.

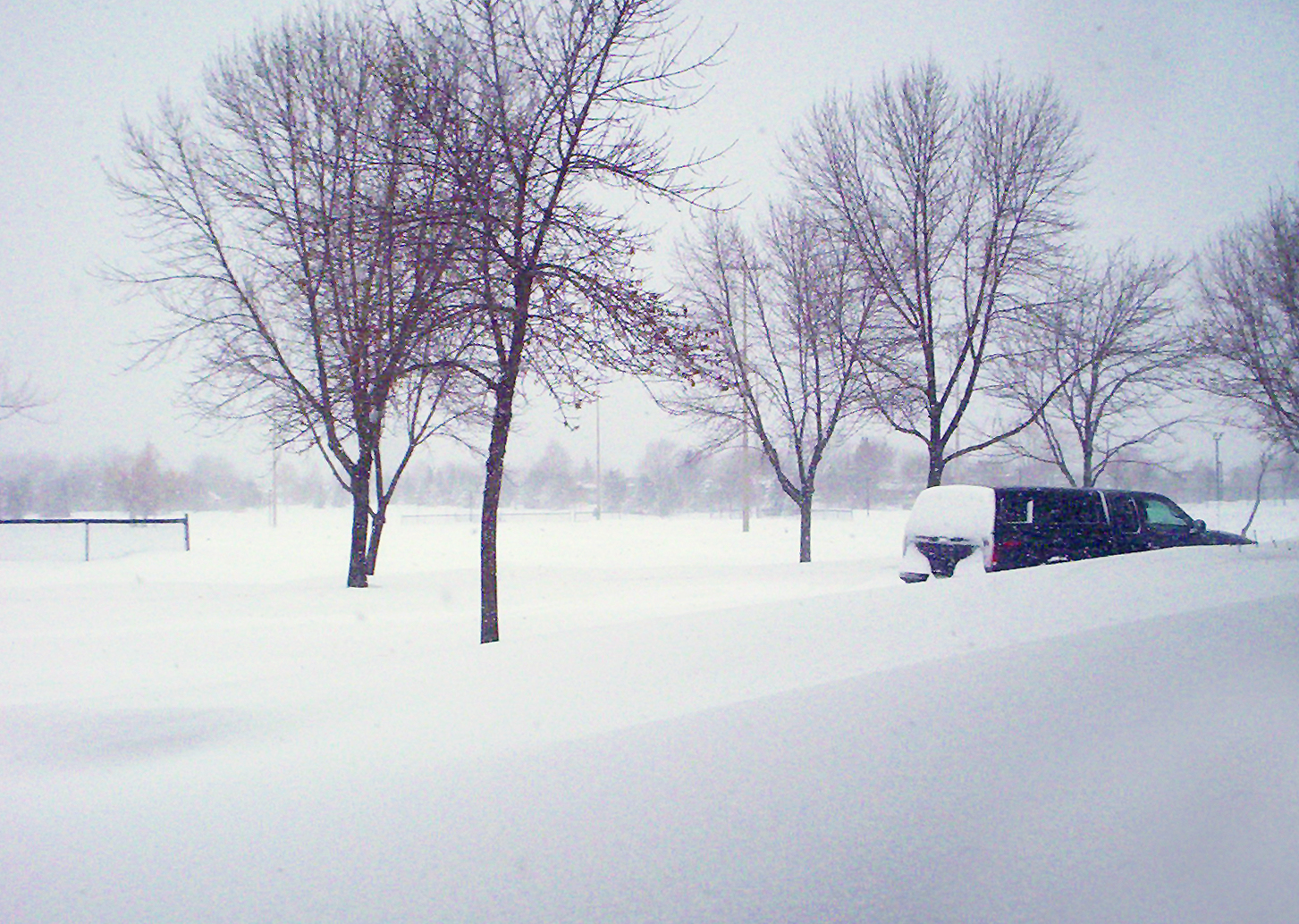
Snow drifts in Hamilton, Ontario where approximately 700 millimetres (28 in) of snow was received

=== Power outages ===
Localized but extensive power outages were reported across areas that were hit by significant amounts of ice. At the peak of the storm over 300,000 customers lost power across the United States. In the Cincinnati area, 122,000 were without power at one point with 52,000 still blacked out as of Wednesday morning. All had been restored by Tuesday morning. About 7,500 customers in Indiana near the Indianapolis region were still without power on February 15, down from a peak of about 50,000 especially in the Bloomington area. Other states that reported outages included Kentucky (14,000), Maryland (at least 135,000 customers, including 69,000 in Anne Arundel County and 25,000 in Prince George's County, Maryland), New Jersey (36,000), Pennsylvania (10,000 in the Pittsburgh region), Virginia (7,800), and New York (18,000) on Long Island. By 10:00 am Thursday, February 15, about 73,000 homes were without electricity in the Washington, D.C. metropolitan area. Most of those outages were from an ice storm that hit areas from the southern Ohio Valley towards the Atlantic Coast.

=== Other disruptions ===
As the storm hit on the week of Valentine's Day, numerous deliveries were delayed significantly. The mayor of Covington, Kentucky, Butch Callery, postponed Valentine's Day until Saturday. Travelers heading to Mardi Gras had to take a train to Washington, D.C. and then drive a rental vehicle to New Orleans.

== Precipitation by region ==
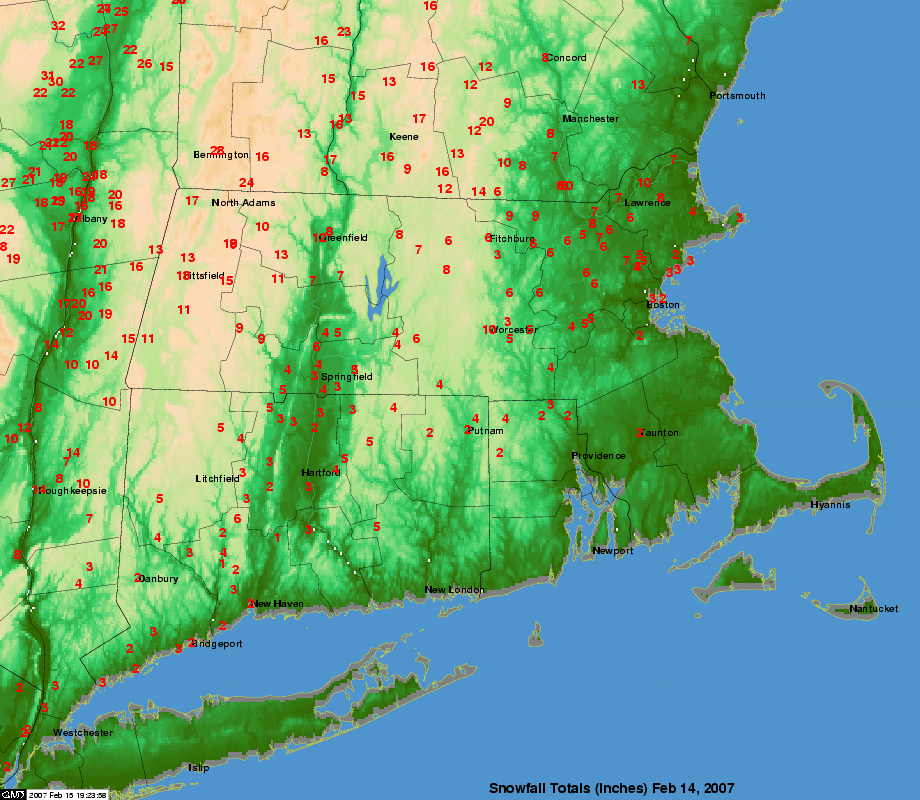
A plot of official snowfall totals in southern New England from the storm.

Storm Snow Totals Totals are for the main system only.
Region	in	cm
Stowe, VT	48	120
DeRuyter, New York	33	84
Stratford, NY	42	110
Cooperstown, NY	33	84
Canaan, VT	31	79
Kingfield, ME	31	79
Bennington, VT	28.0	71
Hamilton, ON	15.7–27.6	40–70
Gorham, NH	26	66
Burlington, VT	25.3	64
Syracuse, NY	22	56
Sherbrooke, QC	21.7	55
Rochester, NY	21.0	53
Binghamton, NY	18.5	47
Niagara Region, ON	10.0–17.8	25–45
Quebec City, QC	17.7	45
Scranton, PA	17.1	43
Lafayette, IN	17.0	43
Albany, NY	16.8	43
Ithaca, NY	16.8	43
Abingdon, IL	9.6	24
Springfield, IL	19.0	48
Granby, QC	15.7	40
Cleveland, OH	15.0	38
Lima, OH	14	36
Normal, IL	13.0	33
Chicago – O'Hare Airport	10.2	26
Montreal, QC	5.9–9.8	15–25
Detroit, Michigan	8.5	22
Indianapolis, IN	8.5	22
Ottawa, ON	5.9	15
Columbus, OH	5.9	15

== New Orleans tornado outbreak ==
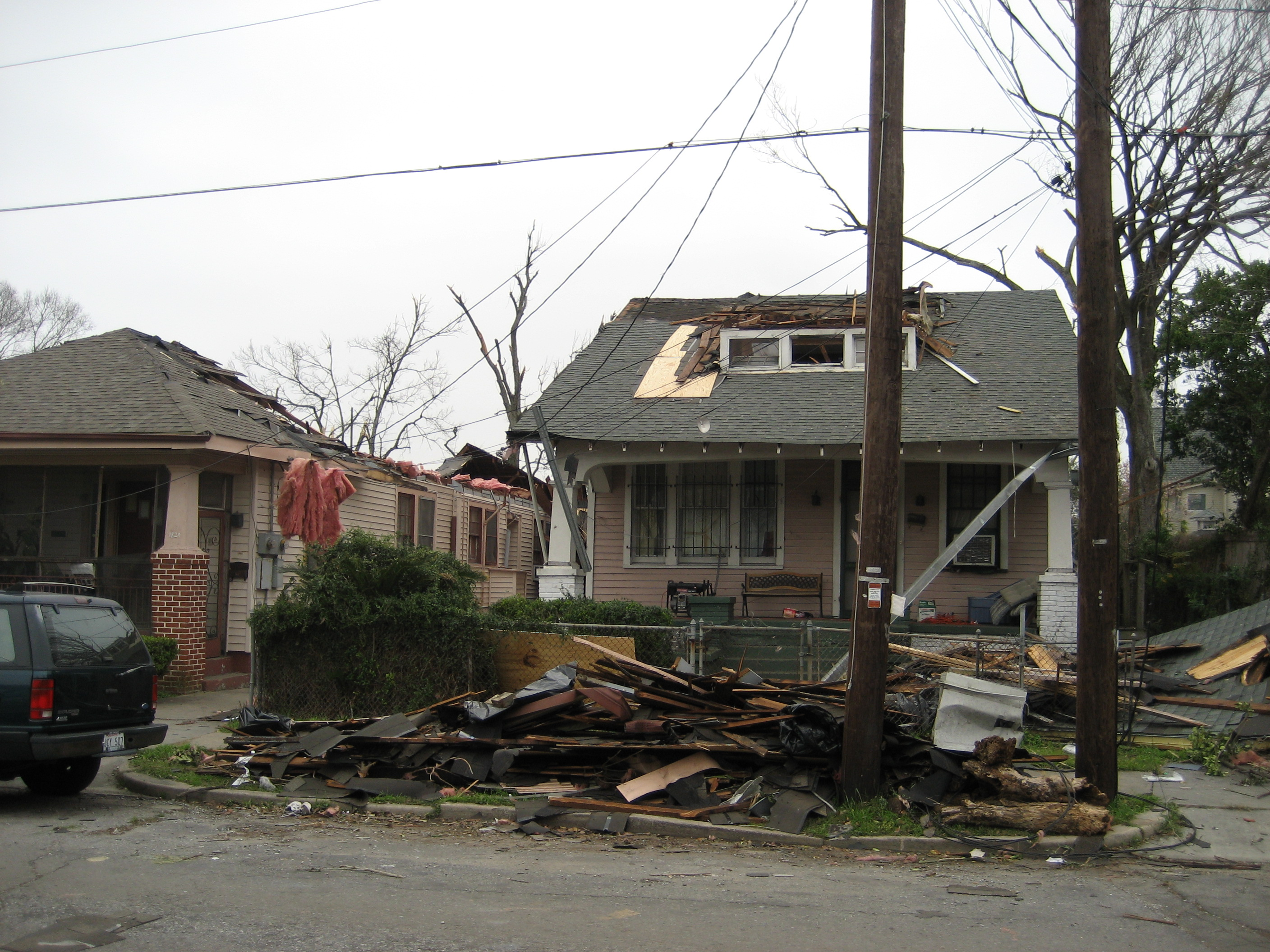
Damage in a residential neighborhood of New Orleans

South of the wintry precipitation zone, severe weather erupted across the Gulf States, where a tornado was reported on February 12 in the New Orleans area killing one person and injuring a dozen in the Pontchartrain Park neighborhood, one of the hardest hit areas by Hurricane Katrina due to the flood waters. The fatality occurred in a FEMA trailer that was hit by the EF2 tornado. In addition to significant structural damage to numerous buildings, including a dozen destroyed, 20,000 residents lost power across the metropolitan area. A separate destructive EF2, also struck the Carrollton and Hollygrove neighborhoods of New Orleans, as well as the town of Westwego, Louisiana.

Severe weather was also reported south of Birmingham, Alabama, near Jackson, Mississippi as well as in Georgia, Florida, and South Carolina. This small outbreak produced a total of 19 tornadoes. A particularly strong squall line passed through Alabama on the evening of February 13 with reports of baseball-sized hail in Montgomery, Alabama.

=== Confirmed tornadoes ===
Confirmed tornadoes by Enhanced Fujita rating
EFU	EF0	EF1	EF2	EF3	EF4	EF5	Total
0	7	9	3	0	0	0	19

==== February 13 event ====
List of confirmed tornadoes – Tuesday, February 13, 2007 (Note: All dates are based on the local time zone where the tornado touched down; however, all times are in Coordinated Universal Time for consistency.)
EF#	Location	County / Parish	State	Start Coord.	Time (UTC)	Path length	Max width	Summary
EF1	Flanders to SW of Pilette	Lafayette	LA	30.11°N 92.02°W	06:10–06:15	2.16 mi (3.48 km)	50 yd (46 m)	Two brick homes received significant roof damage. One home had its garage destroyed which caused part of the roof to be ripped off. The neighbors roof was damaged by flying debris. 31 other homes sustained lesser damage, trees were downed, and other debris was blown across fields and into trees along the path as well.
EF2	Ruth to SSW of Henderson	St. Martin	LA	30.235°N 91.865°W	06:36–06:46	4.31 mi (6.94 km)	300 yd (270 m)	The same storm that spawned the previous tornado later spawned this low-end EF2 tornado to the northeast. 80 homes and mobile homes were impacted, 44 of which sustained significant damage or were destroyed. Trees in the area were damaged and uprooted, and 3 people were injured in a small brick home where the roof blew off, causing a brick wall and other debris to land on them. This was the strongest tornado in southwest Louisiana since the November 23, 2004 tornado outbreak.
EF0	ESE of New Iberia	Iberia	LA	29.98°N 91.76°W	07:03–07:04	0.46 mi (0.74 km)	25 yd (23 m)	A mobile home was pushed into a neighbor's car and house.
EF0	NW of Charon	Vermilion	LA	30.03°N 92.04°W	07:25–07:26	0.46 mi (0.74 km)	25 yd (23 m)	A brief tornado destroyed a house that was under construction.
EF2	Westwego to ESE of Metairie	Jefferson, Orleans	LA	29.897°N 90.153°W	08:55–09:08	8.72 mi (14.03 km)	50 yd (46 m)	This strong tornado first touched down in Westwego before crossing the Mississippi River into the northwestern side of New Orleans. Significant damage occurred in the Uptown and Carrollton of the city. Several structures in Westwego were significantly damaged, including a two-story motel building which had its roof removed and a portion of the second floor walls caved in. In New Orleans, the tornado heavily damaged several warehouses, homes, and commercial buildings. The roofs and portions of roofs were removed from a number of houses. The collapse of some exterior walls was also noted. 24 people were injured and damage was estimated at $2 million.
EF2	Gentilly	Orleans	LA	30.0121°N 90.0519°W	09:10–09:12	1.29 mi (2.08 km)	50 yd (46 m)	1 death – A second strong tornado touched down after the previous one dissipated and struck the Pontchartrain Park neighborhood in Gentilly northeast of New Orleans. Several homes sustained considerable structural damage in that area. Extensive damage to trees and power lines occurred before it lifted near the Industrial Canal. Damage was also reported to many FEMA trailers in this area that was devastated by Hurricane Katrina. An 86-year-old woman died from her injuries after her FEMA trailer was destroyed. Roofs were blown off of several homes and the upper portions of two story houses were partially collapsed. 10 other people were injured. In total, the two New Orleans tornadoes destroyed 55 houses and damaged 526 others. Damage was $1 million.
EF1	Lemon	Smith	MS	32.1438°N 89.5106°W	09:52–09:57	1.29 mi (2.08 km)	50 yd (46 m)	One home had some roofing blown off, power poles were blown down and multiple trees were snapped. Another home sustained damage to its porch, and a chicken house also sustained minor roof damage.
EF0	SW of Bassfield	Jefferson Davis	MS	31.4182°N 89.8459°W	10:13–10:16	3 mi (4.8 km)	75 yd (69 m)	A weak tornado downed several trees and broke off tree limbs.
EF0	SE of Poplarville	Pearl River	MS	30.7789°N 89.4705°W	10:45	0.3 mi (0.48 km)	25 yd (23 m)	A brief, weak tornado knocked down a few trees.
EF0	ENE of Ocean Springs	Jackson	MS	30.4477°N 88.7425°W	13:20–13:23	0.3 mi (0.48 km)	25 yd (23 m)	A brief, weak tornado caused no significant damage.
EF1	N of Hosford	Liberty	FL	30.4089°N 84.8°W	20:05–20:06	0.25 mi (0.40 km)	50 yd (46 m)	The roof was blown off of a house and a large shed was destroyed. Numerous pine trees were snapped as well.
EF1	N of Meriwether to N of Edgefield	McCormick, Edgefield	SC	33.65°N 82.17°W	22:47–23:15	31.33 mi (50.42 km)	200 yd (180 m)	In McCormick County, two homes sustained minor damage and several trees were downed. In Edgefield County, numerous other trees were downed, three outbuildings were destroyed, and one other was severely damaged. The tornado was down only intermittently.
EF0	Newbern	Hale, Perry	AL	32.5928°N 87.5715°W	23:01–23:13	6.52 mi (10.49 km)	25 yd (23 m)	Several old barns and metal sheds were lightly damaged, and numerous trees were downed, including at least one that fell onto a mobile home.
EF1	SE of Duncanville to Eoline	Tuscaloosa, Bibb	AL	33.0128°N 87.3994°W	23:10–23:29	9.71 mi (15.63 km)	400 yd (370 m)	Several trailers, homes, barns and sheds were damaged along the path. Additionally, numerous trees were snapped off and downed.
EF1	E of Sylvania	Screven	GA	32.75°N 81.5956°W	23:28–23:29	0.6 mi (0.97 km)	35 yd (32 m)	A pump house was destroyed, a large tree branch fell onto a car, a mobile home and an outbuilding was damaged, and uprooted and snapped several trees. Nearly a dozen large pecan trees were uprooted. Other pecan trees had large limbs broken off, and one person was injured.
EF0	Sixmile	Bibb	AL	33.02°N 87.08°W	23:48–00:01	7.47 mi (12.02 km)	250 yd (230 m)	Sporadic tree and building damage occurred.
EF1	SE of Allendale	Allendale	SC	32.99°N 81.29°W	00:01–00:02	0.03 mi (0.048 km)	30 yd (27 m)	A brief tornado uprooted trees and damaged the skirting of a mobile home.
EF1	NE of Mulberry	Autauga	AL	32.4653°N 86.7469°W	00:22–00:23	1.1 mi (1.8 km)	200 yd (180 m)	Several trees were snapped off and uprooted. The roof of a carport was lifted off and thrown into the front yard of another residence, and a tractor shed in the same area had sheet metal blown off its roof.
EF1	ESE of Olar	Bamberg	SC	33.1391°N 81.1312°W	00:27–00:37	2.01 mi (3.23 km)	40 yd (37 m)	A weak tornado downed several trees.

== Gallery ==
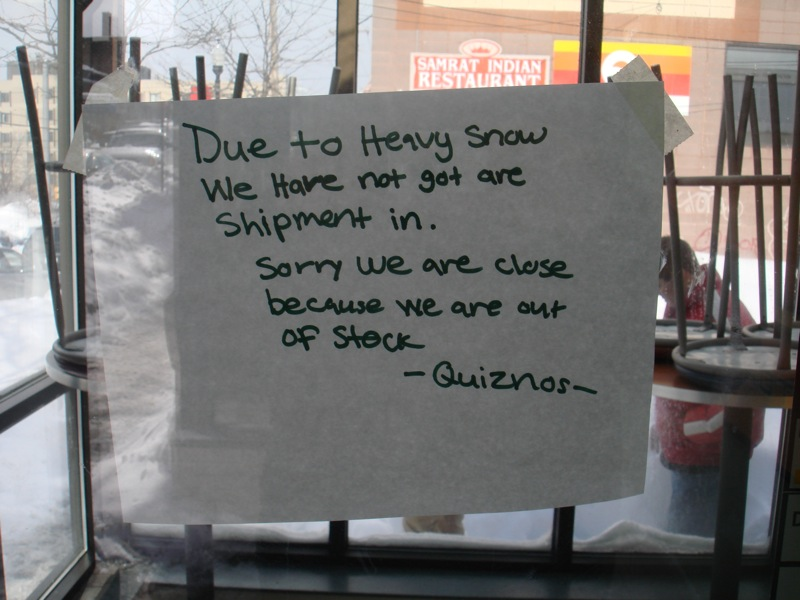
A Quiznos Sub in Syracuse, New York closed due to snowfall affecting shipments.

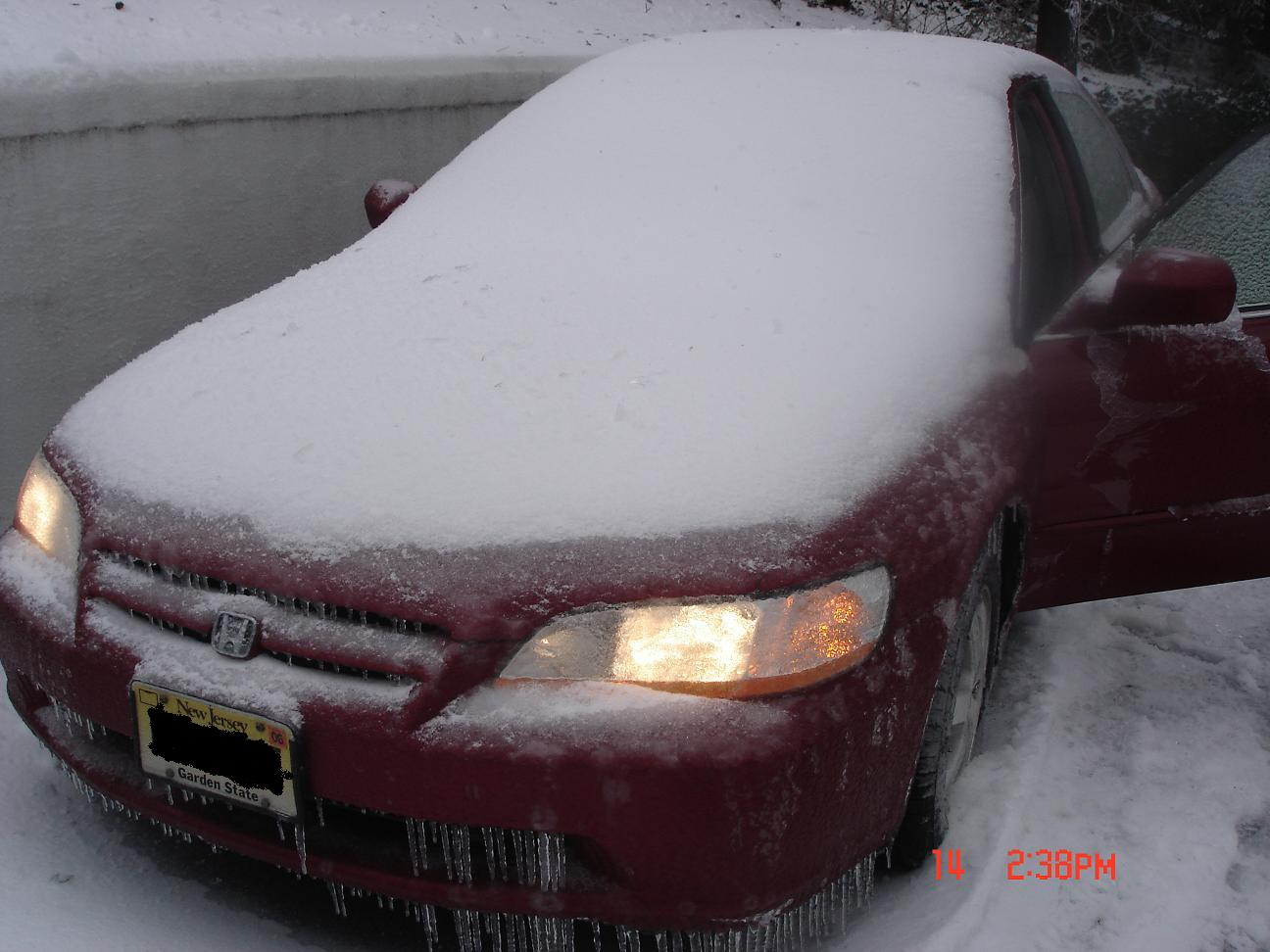
A New Jersey car covered in snow and ice after the blizzard.

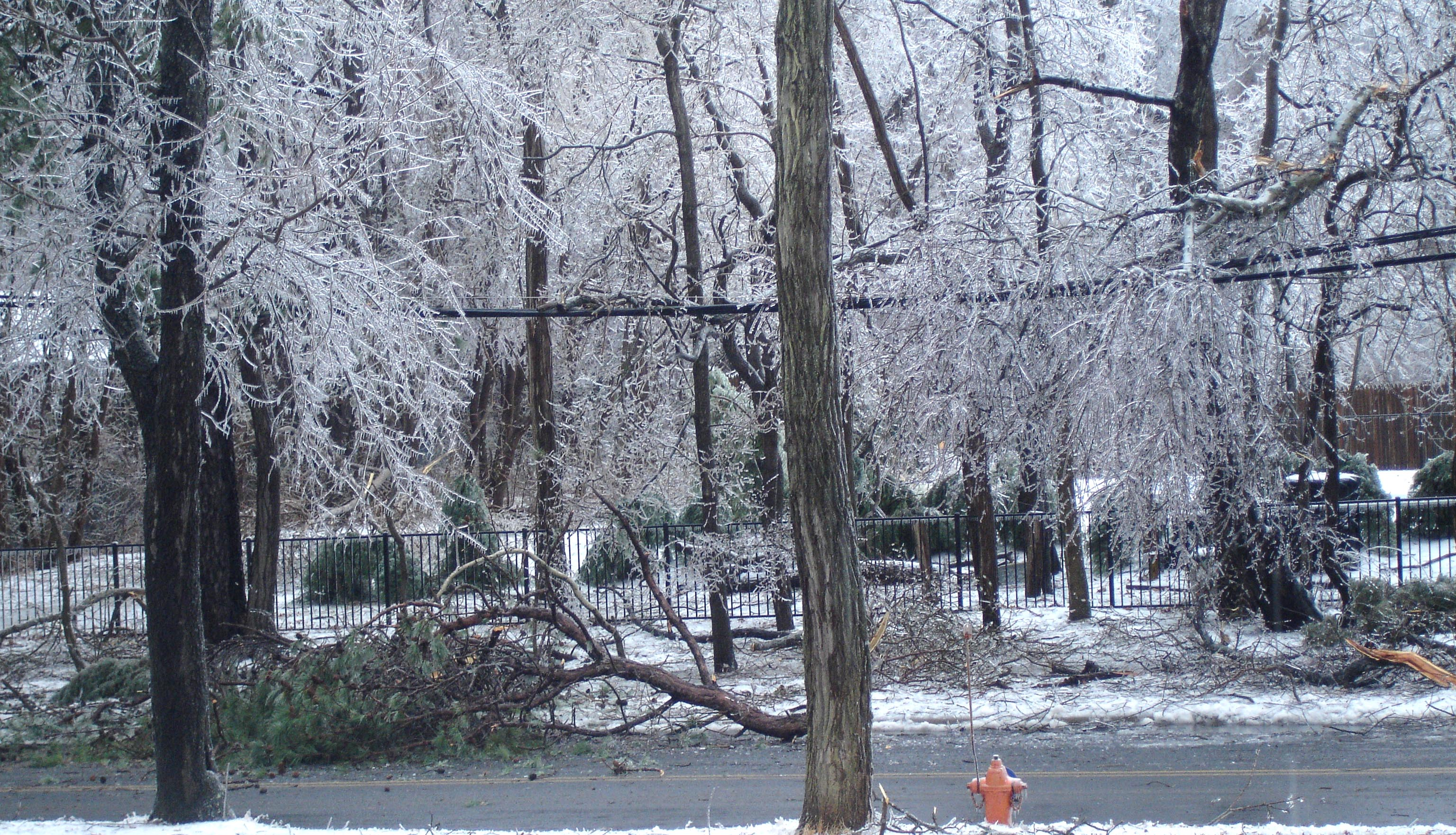
Ice storm topples trees on to roadway and power lines in Tinton Falls, New Jersey, on Valentine's Day 2007.

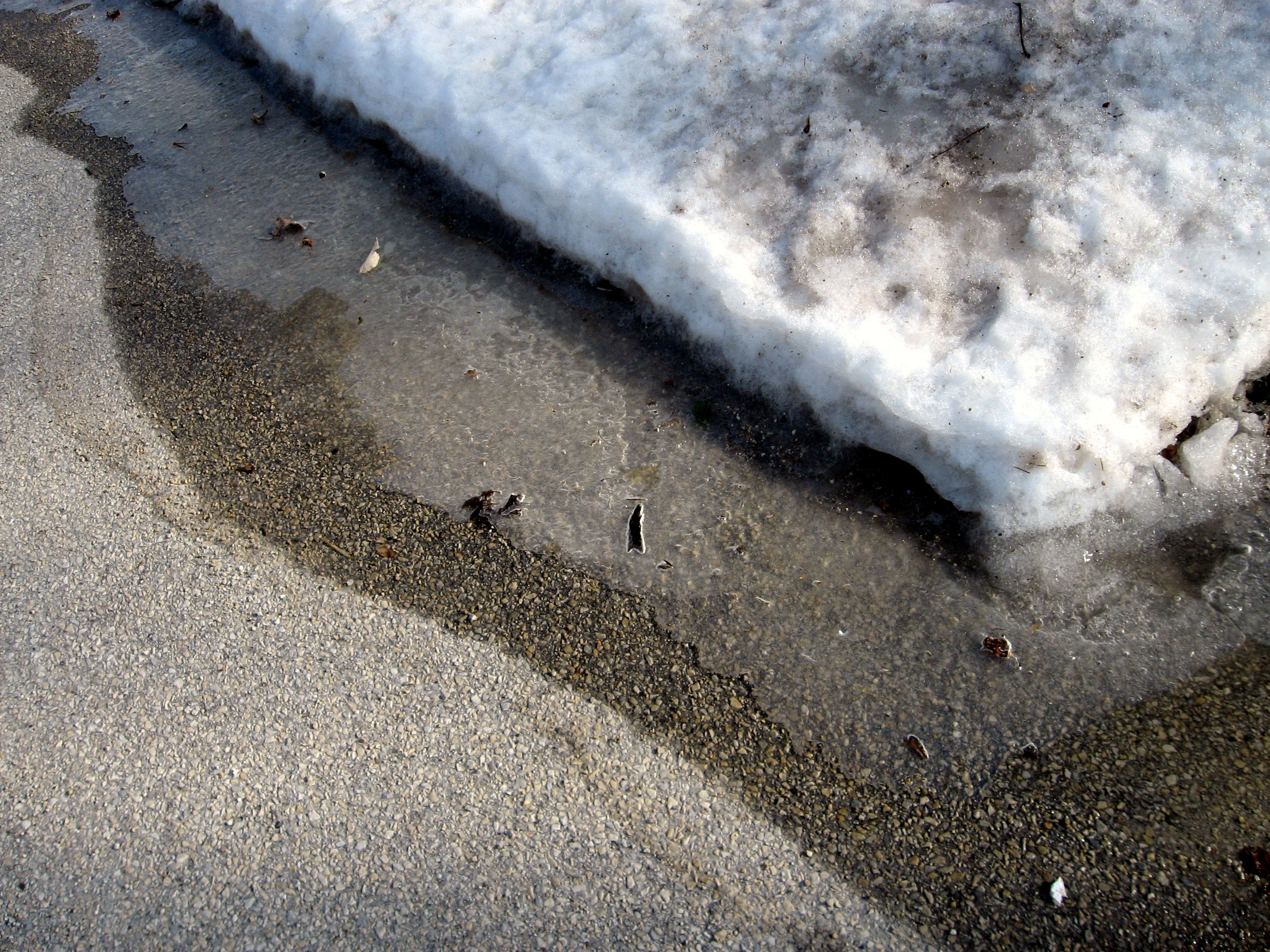
Over a week after the storm in Chester County, Pennsylvania, melted snow refreezes into ice on a street.

== See also ==
- Global storm activity of 2006
- Global storm activity of 2007
- Tornadoes of 2007
