= Benjamin Flanders =

American politician (1816–1896)

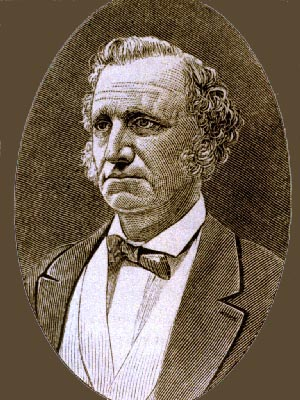

24th Mayor of New Orleans
- In office April 4, 1870 – November 29, 1872
- Preceded by: John R. Conway
- Succeeded by: Louis A. Wiltz

21st Governor of Louisiana
- In office June 8, 1867 – January 8, 1868
- Lieutenant: Albert Voorhies
- Preceded by: James M. Wells
- Succeeded by: Joshua Baker

Member of the U.S. House of Representatives from Louisiana's 1st district
- In office February 17, 1863 – March 3, 1863
- Preceded by: John Edward Bouligny (1861)
- Succeeded by: J. Hale Sypher (1868)

Personal details
- Born: Benjamin Franklin Flanders; January 26, 1816 Bristol, New Hampshire, U.S.
- Died: March 13, 1896 (aged 80) Lafayette Parish, Louisiana, U.S.
- Party: Republican
- Spouse: Susan H. Sawyer

Benjamin Franklin Flanders (January 26, 1816 – March 13, 1896) was a teacher, politician and planter in New Orleans, Louisiana. In 1867, he was appointed by the military commander as the 21st Governor of Louisiana during Reconstruction, a position which he held for some six months. He was the second and, as of 2025, the last Republican mayor of New Orleans.

== Early life ==
Flanders was born in Bristol, New Hampshire. At the age of twenty-six, he graduated from Dartmouth College in Dartmouth, New Hampshire.

In January 1843, he moved to New Orleans and read law under Charles M. Emerson. The following year he left this study to become a schoolteacher and principal. In 1845, Flanders became editor of New Orleans Tropic, a local newspaper. In 1847, he married Susan H. Sawyer in Bristol, New Hampshire. She returned with him to New Orleans, where they had six children together.

== Political career ==
Flanders became active in politics, elected as a Democratic alderman representing the 3rd Municipal District of New Orleans, serving from 1847 to 1852. In 1852, he was selected as the secretary and treasurer of the New Orleans, Opelousas and Great Western Railroad, a position he held until 1862. In 1861, he fled New Orleans, leaving his family behind. He had opposed secession, and sentiment against Unionists was very strong.

Flanders made his way to Cairo, Illinois; Columbus, Ohio; and eventually, New York City. He did not return to New Orleans until April 1862, when the city was captured by Union troops. On July 20, he was appointed by the military government as New Orleans City Treasurer. He served until his election to Congress on December 3, 1862. He was elected along with Michael Hahn as at-large Representatives of Louisiana, assuming the seat left vacant after J. E. Bouligny's term expired in 1861. Flanders and Hahn were not seated in Congress until the last fifteen days of their terms on February 17, 1863.

On July 13, 1863, Flanders was made the Captain of Company C, 5th Regiment Louisiana Volunteers, a Union Army unit. He was honorably discharged in August 1863, when he was appointed a Special Agent of the United States Treasury Department of the Southern Region by Secretary of the Treasury Salmon P. Chase. He held this position until 1866. While in office, he generated commissions for the government by selling confiscated cotton from Confederate plantations. The Department of Treasury controlled licensing of cotton brokers, trying to regulate the market, but a black market flourished for the lucrative sale of cotton.

In 1864, Flanders campaigned for governor and finished in third place behind Michael Hahn and Fellows. He was appointed by Republicans as the first Supervising Special Agent of the Freedmen's Bureau, Department of the Gulf. At the same time, he led the movement to create a local Republican Party in Louisiana. He formed the 'Friends of Universal Suffrage' with other Louisiana Unionists (known as scalawags to opponents), as well as free men of color (who had been free before the war) and freedmen; they were working to gain black suffrage and to repeal the Louisiana Black Codes. These laws had been passed to control the movement of freedmen. Fearful of the black majority in many Louisiana districts, most white Democrats opposed giving freedmen suffrage, especially after Confederate veterans were temporarily disenfranchised unless they took a loyalty oath. The tension over the rights of freed slaves escalated into the New Orleans riot of 1866, in which whites attacked blacks.

In 1867, General Philip Sheridan, Commander of the 5th Military District, which included Louisiana and Texas, removed elected Governor James Madison Wells for not responding to the riots appropriately and for not advancing the rights of freedmen. Sheridan appointed Flanders as Governor of Louisiana. About six months later, on January 1, 1868, Major General Winfield Scott Hancock, as the new military commander of Louisiana, removed all radical Republicans from state offices. Governor Flanders resigned on January 8 and was replaced by General Hancock's appointee, Joshua Baker.

In 1867, he appointed Monroe Baker as mayor of St. Martinville, Louisiana who may have been the first African-American to serve as mayor in the United States.

In 1870, Governor Henry C. Warmoth, elected as part of the Reconstruction era civil government, appointed Flanders as Mayor of New Orleans. He was later elected to a full two-year mayoral term, serving until 1873. That year, President Ulysses S. Grant appointed Flanders as Assistant Treasurer of the United States. Flanders ran unsuccessfully in 1888 as a Republican candidate for Louisiana State Treasurer; by that time, the Democrats controlled most statewide elected positions.

Flanders retired to his Ben Alva plantation in Lafayette Parish. He died there in 1896. His remains were interred at Metairie Cemetery in New Orleans.

== Legacy ==
Flanders remains the most recent Republican mayor of the city of New Orleans.

The unincorporated community that grew up around his Lafayette Parish plantation west of Youngsville is sometimes known as Flanders. A road into the community, New Flanders Road, was renamed Ambassador Caffery Parkway in 1975 and is now a major thoroughfare in Lafayette.

Party political offices
| First | Radical Republican nominee for Governor of Louisiana; 1864 | Succeeded by None |
Political offices
| Preceded by (Vacant 1861–1862); J. E. Bouligny | Member of the U.S. House of Representatives from Louisiana's 1st congressional district 1862–1863 | Succeeded by (Vacant 1863–1867); J. Hale Sypher |
| Preceded by James M. Wells | Governor of Louisiana; 1867–1868 | Succeeded by Joshua Baker |
| Preceded by John R. Conway | Mayor of New Orleans; 1870–1872 | Succeeded by Louis A. Wiltz |
