= Monroe Baker =

American politician

Mayor of St. Martinville, Louisiana
- In office October 1867 – February 1868
- Preceded by: Pierre Gary
- Succeeded by: A.L. Tertron

Personal details
- Born: 1821 or 1823
- Spouse(s): Mary L. Barrier; Clotide Baker
- Children: 12

Monroe Baker (born 1821 or 1823) was an American politician who served as mayor of St. Martinville, Louisiana. He was one of the earliest, if not the first, African-American mayor in the United States.

== Biography ==
Baker was born in either 1821 (per the 1870 US census) or 1823 (per the 1850 US census) in St. Mary Parish, Louisiana, and moved to St. Martinville, Louisiana. He is listed as a free black of mixed race descent, and farmer was listed as his occupation.

In October 1867, Governor Benjamin Flanders appointed him mayor of St. Martinville after the death of Mayor Pierre Gary. In response, an editorial printed in an Alexandria newspaper called Baker a slur and said it was unnatural for a black person to be mayor over white residents. Baker served until February 1868 when A.L. Tertron succeeded him as mayor.

In 1875, Baker ran in the election for the four seats for trustees of St. Martinsville; he came in fifth place.

In the 1870 census, Baker was listed as a "livery stable keeper", and by 1891, he was listed as "an enterprising citizen and successful planter".

In 1845, he married Mary L. Barrier, and they had 12 children. Sources indicate that he had a second wife named Clotide with whom he had five children, and it is surmised that he had twelve children between his two wives.

== See also ==
- List of first African-American mayors
