= Flanders, Louisiana =

Unincorporated community in Louisiana, U.S.

Coordinates: 30°05′57″N 92°01′56″W

Flanders (French: Flandre) is an unincorporated community in Lafayette Parish, Louisiana, United States. It lies at the intersection of Louisiana Highways 339 and 92.

The community is named after Benjamin F. Flanders, Governor of Louisiana during Reconstruction and Mayor of New Orleans.
