= FEMA trailer =

Temporary manufactured housing assigned to the victims of natural disaster

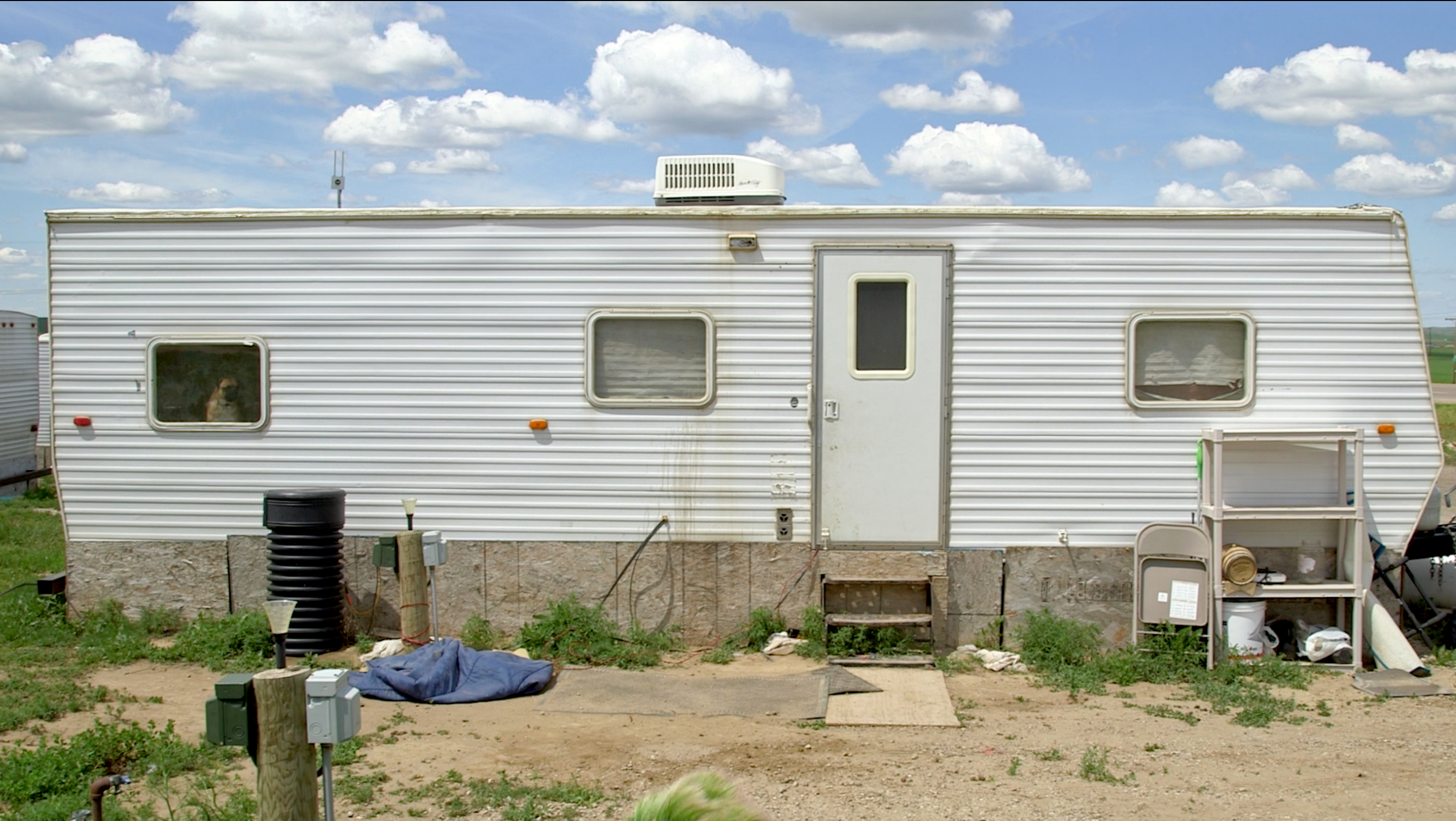
A FEMA trailer

The term FEMA trailer, or FEMA travel trailer, is the name commonly given by the United States government to forms of temporary manufactured housing assigned to the victims of natural disaster by the Federal Emergency Management Agency (FEMA). Such trailers are intended to provide intermediate term shelter, functioning longer than tents which are often used for short-term shelter immediately following a disaster. FEMA trailers serve a similar function to the "earthquake shacks" erected to provide interim housing after the 1906 San Francisco earthquake.

FEMA trailers were used to house thousands of people in South Florida displaced by Hurricane Andrew in August 1992, some for as long as two and a half years. After Hurricane Charley in 2004, 17,000 FEMA-issued trailers and mobile homes were successfully deployed. At least 145,000 trailers were bought by FEMA to house survivors who lost their homes during the 2005 Atlantic hurricane season due to Hurricane Katrina and Hurricane Rita. FEMA trailers were also made available after extensive flooding in parts of New York, Pennsylvania, and New Jersey due to Superstorm Sandy in 2012.

News reports of health issues relating to Katrina-issue FEMA trailers began to appear in July 2006. A federal report in July 2006 identified toxic levels of formaldehyde in 42% of the trailers examined, attributing problems to poor construction and substandard building materials. As of 2012, two class-action lawsuits were settled, between residents of Louisiana, Mississippi, Alabama and Texas, and (1) manufacturers who built mobile homes for the Federal Emergency Management Agency (FEMA) and (2) FEMA contractors who installed and maintained them.

FEMA trailers are the property of the U.S. government and are expected to be returned after use. In 1995, some Florida residents who had difficulty finding accommodation in the aftermath of Hurricane Andrew "bought their FEMA trailers for an average of $1,100 each." Following Hurricanes Katrina and Rita, the U.S. government was left with large numbers of FEMA trailers. Surplus FEMA trailers were sold via online public auctions conducted by the General Services Administration. The distribution and resale of Katrina FEMA trailers has been heavily criticized given the possible health risks involved.

Since 2012, FEMA has modified its model for responding to storms. It provides money for temporary housing or repairs to get through the emergency, and treats FEMA trailers as a "last resort".

== Description ==
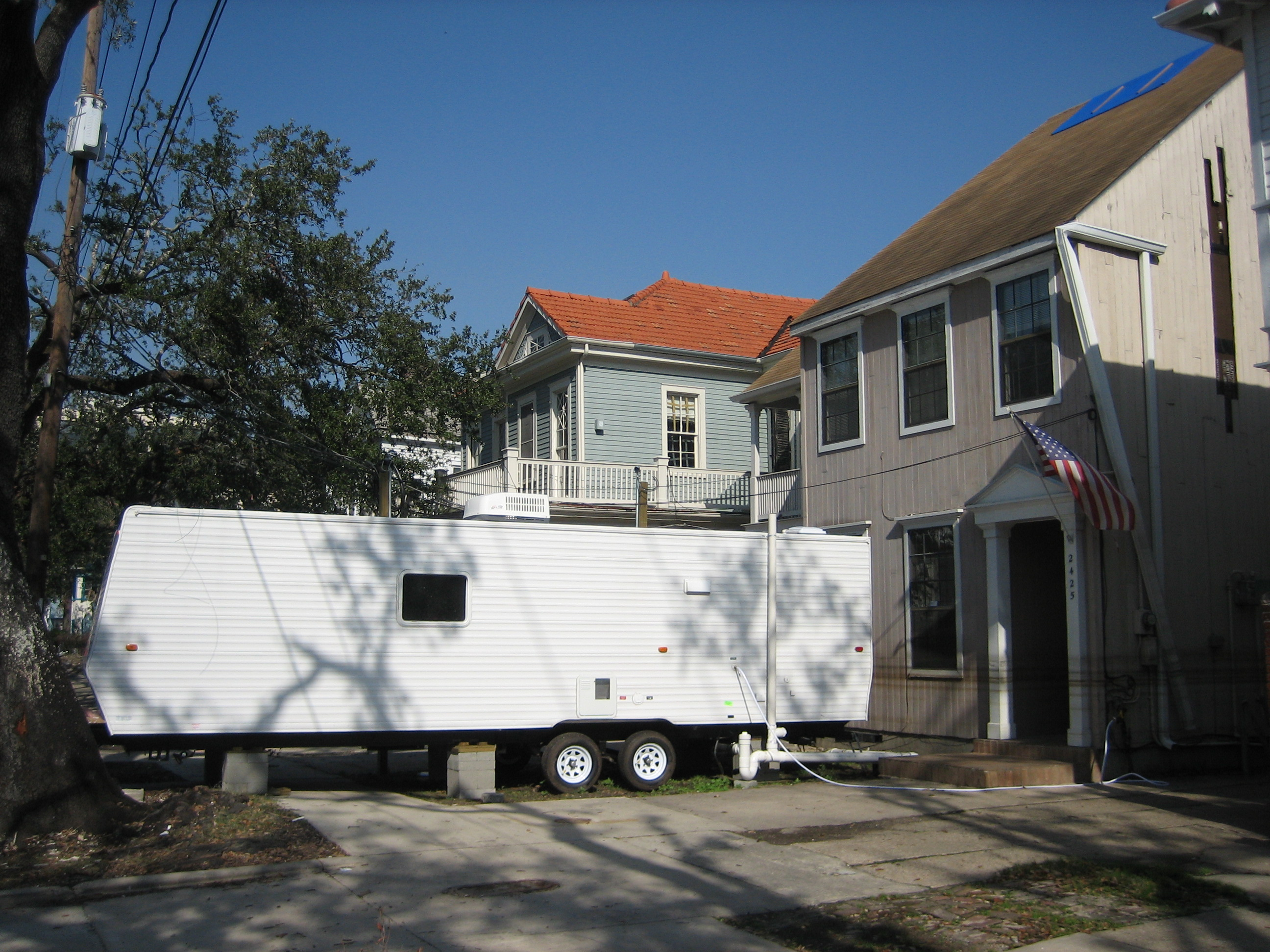
A FEMA trailer (travel trailer) in front of a formerly flooded house in New Orleans.

Although several types and sizes of manufactured structures have been installed throughout the Gulf Coast region, most are mass-produced, one-bedroom travel trailers. These typical FEMA trailers are designed to accommodate two adults and two children. There are larger trailers and other manufactured structures that can accommodate larger families.

A typical FEMA trailer can measure 14' by 22' (308 sq. ft.) or 8' by 32' (256 sq. ft.). It consists of a master bedroom with a standard size bed, a living area with kitchen and stove, bunk beds, and a bathroom with shower. Each trailer is equipped with electricity, air conditioning, indoor heating, running cold and hot water, a propane-operated stove and oven, a small microwave oven, a large refrigerator, and a few pieces of furniture attached to the floor; usually a sofabed, a small table, and two chairs. There are only a handful of FEMA trailer designs, so nearly all trailers have the same general layout. Furniture is attached to the trailer; it is not possible to move it, and it would be illegal to do so. It is also illegal to paint the inside or outside of the trailer. Trailers have little storage space, can be very cramped, and offer little or no privacy.

Each trailer is elevated about two feet (0.6 m) above the ground, on concrete supports. There is only one door on the side of each trailer, which is accessible through a wooden or aluminum stairwell. There are also long ramps for wheelchair-using occupants. Electrical service to the FEMA trailers is installed by the local power company. (For example, in most of the Gulf Coast region power is provided by the Entergy Corporation.) Each trailer has its own power meter. Trailers have ports for telephone access, cable, and Internet access. However, these services are not handled by FEMA, and a trailer occupant must arrange to have these services installed by a local provider.

The typical FEMA trailer has two propane tanks on the front of the trailer behind the master bedroom, which provide the hot water, indoor heating, and gas for the stove and oven. Running water for the trailer is usually provided by some sort of water source on the property, usually through a garden hose. Sewage is piped directly to an underground sewage main on the property. Most trailers have several windows which can be opened, as well as small light fixtures in each room.

FEMA trailers are manufactured from plastic, aluminum, and particle board, and are therefore somewhat flimsy and require more maintenance than a permanent structure. They are also poorly insulated, offer little sound insulation, and are known to sway in high winds.

While occupying FEMA travel trailers or mobile homes, residents are responsible for maintaining their trailers, such as keeping the trailers clean, changing lightbulbs and smoke-detector batteries, and making sure propane fuel tanks are refilled with fuel.

Travel trailers and mobile homes are to be inspected once a month for the occupant's safety and convenience: if a travel trailer or mobile home requires maintenance beyond basic upkeep, residents are told to call the appropriate travel trailer maintenance hotline for their parish or county. In Houston, 1200 of the 4600 trailers initially issued after Hurricane Rita required serious repairs by late 2006.

== Need ==
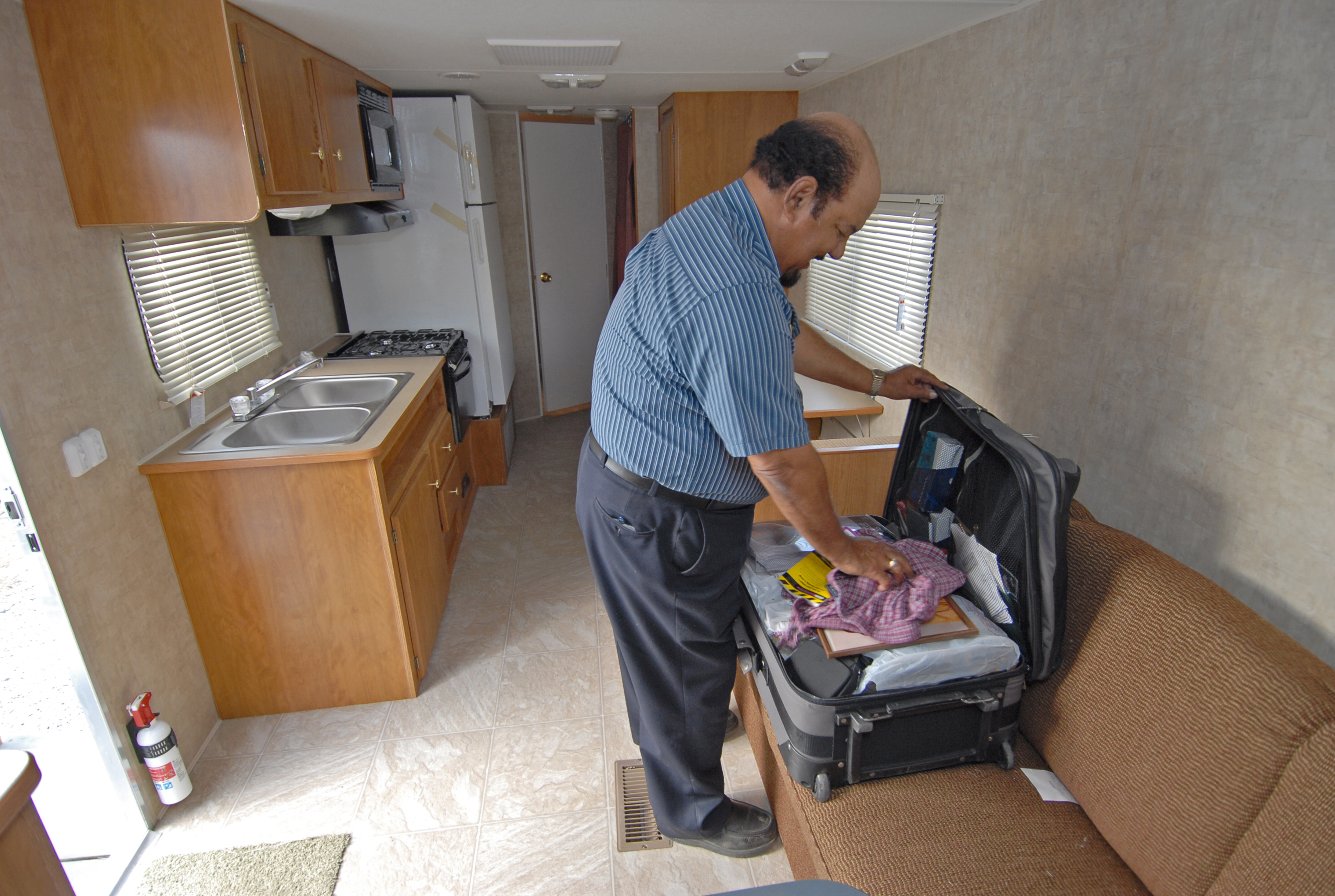
A Southern University at New Orleans professor moves into a FEMA trailer in April 2006, more than half a year after Katrina.

FEMA trailers are intended to provide temporary housing for homeowners after a disaster, until they can repair or rebuild their homes. Hurricanes, tornadoes, floods and other natural disasters can cause extensive damage to residential neighborhoods, as occurred in 2005 because of Hurricane Katrina.

Damaged areas may take substantial periods of time to repair. Residents may be unable to return home for long periods of time while local government officials attempt to restore basic infrastructure for water and electricity. Flood damage to existing homes and apartments may require the complete removal and replacement of carpeting, flooring, insulation, and sheetrock. Flood damage beyond a few inches may also destroy furniture, appliances, and other personal belongings. Buildings that have sustained significant water damage, including apartment complexes, often require extensive rebuilding and a mold-removal process known as "mold remediation" before they can be rendered safe enough for habitation. Roofs may also need to be replaced or repaired.

Widespread damage in an area may cause extreme housing shortages. The extent of the rebuilding effort in such an area may cause a shortage of building contractors and materials throughout the region. This further delays the construction of new housing, and increases a need for existing apartments or motels to house incoming construction and service workers. Leasing rates for apartments may become prohibitively high for those who have lost their homes, particularly working class storm victims. FEMA trailers, which are offered rent-free, may be the only form of habitable dwellings available to those within a disaster area. In 2005, "the devastation of housing in New Orleans and surrounding communities was so widespread that large numbers of the displaced had few options but to take up residence in FEMA parks" following extreme flood damage. FEMA trailer occupants reported that they preferred the trailers to living in cars, tents, partially gutted homes, and the crowded homes of relatives.

FEMA policy generally allows residents to live in a FEMA trailer for a period of 18 months, beginning at the time at which they receive access to the trailer. However, this period has sometimes been extended when availability of housing continued to be a serious problem for a longer time. In the case of Hurricane Katrina in August 2005, deadlines were extended to allow people to live in trailers for up to 45 months.

== Application process ==
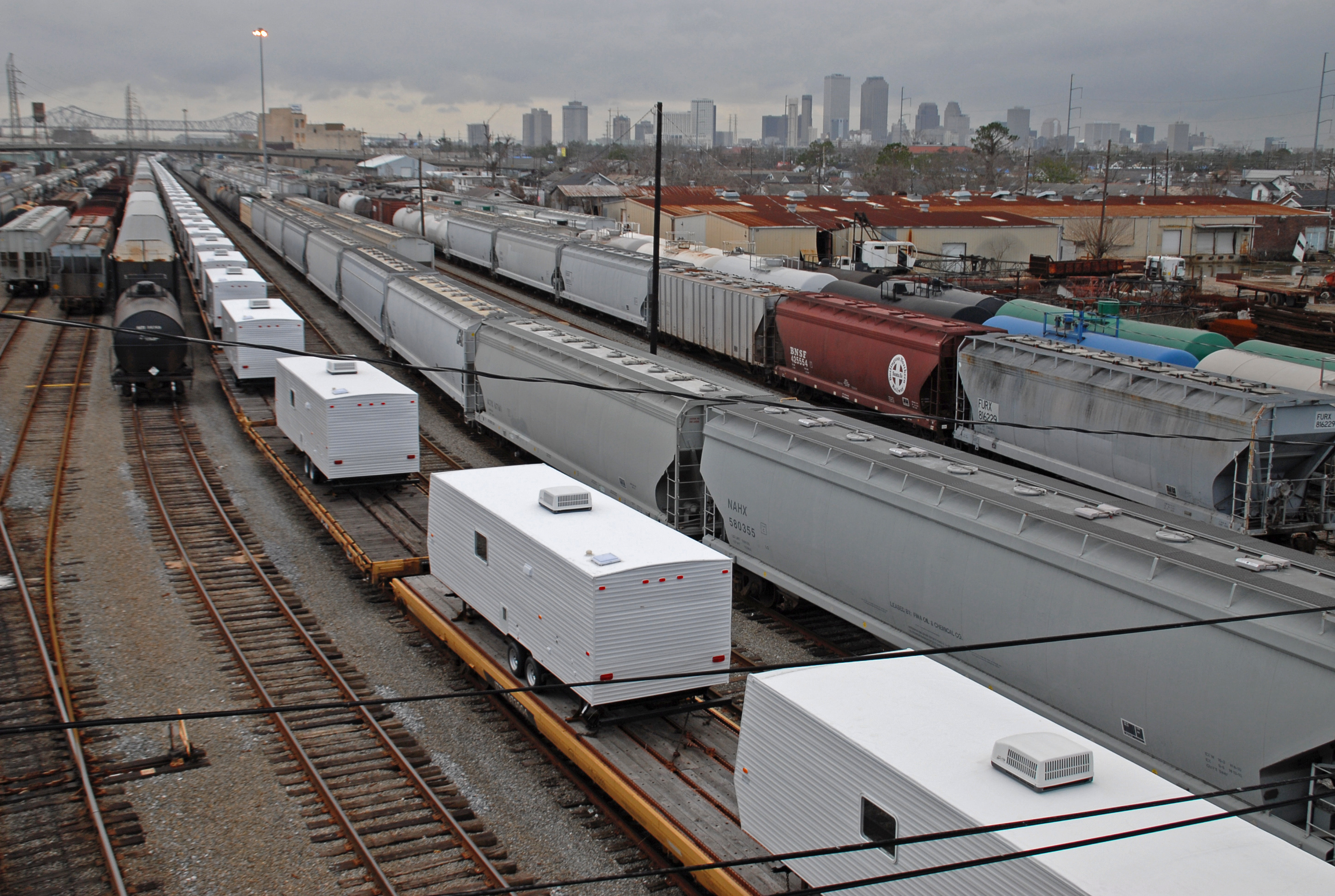
FEMA trailers delivered to New Orleans by train, after Hurricane Katrina

People within a disaster area are eligible to apply for various forms of "Housing assistance" from the Federal Emergency Management Agency (FEMA). These may include: (1) reimbursement for short term hotel expenses (2) money or vouchers towards rental of a place to live for up to 18 months while your home is being repaired (3) money to make repairs to your home (4) money to purchase a new home if your home cannot be repaired (5) a temporary "FEMA-owned manufactured housing unit" as a last resort if no other housing options are available.

To obtain disaster manufactured housing, someone must complete a FEMA application, after which they will be interviewed by a FEMA adjuster, who is similar to an insurance claims adjuster. The adjuster will determine if the damage to the home warrants temporary housing until the home is repaired. After approval, the applicant is placed on a waiting list.

== Installation ==
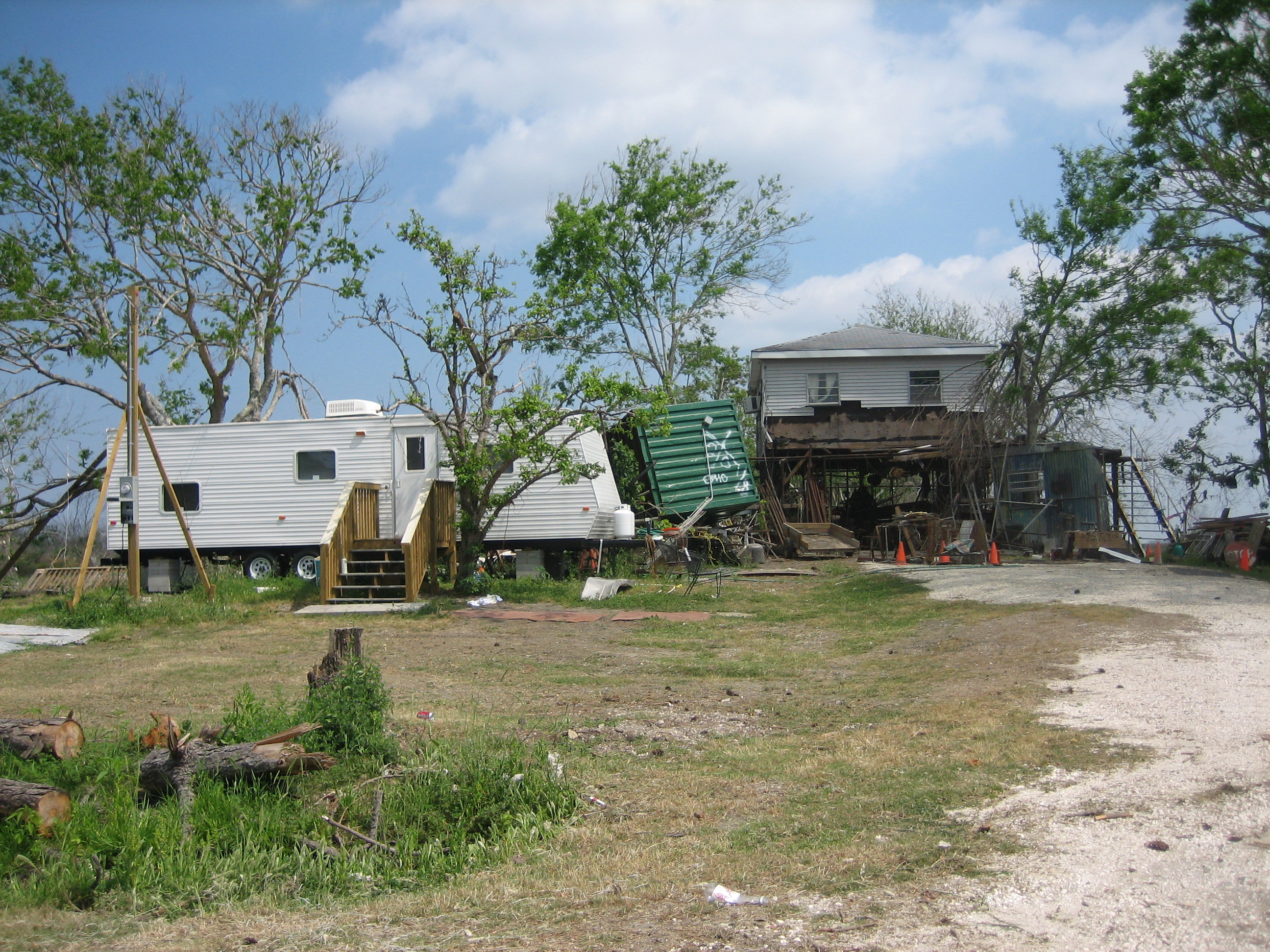
FEMA trailer (at left) alongside a Katrina-damaged house in St. Bernard Parish, Louisiana

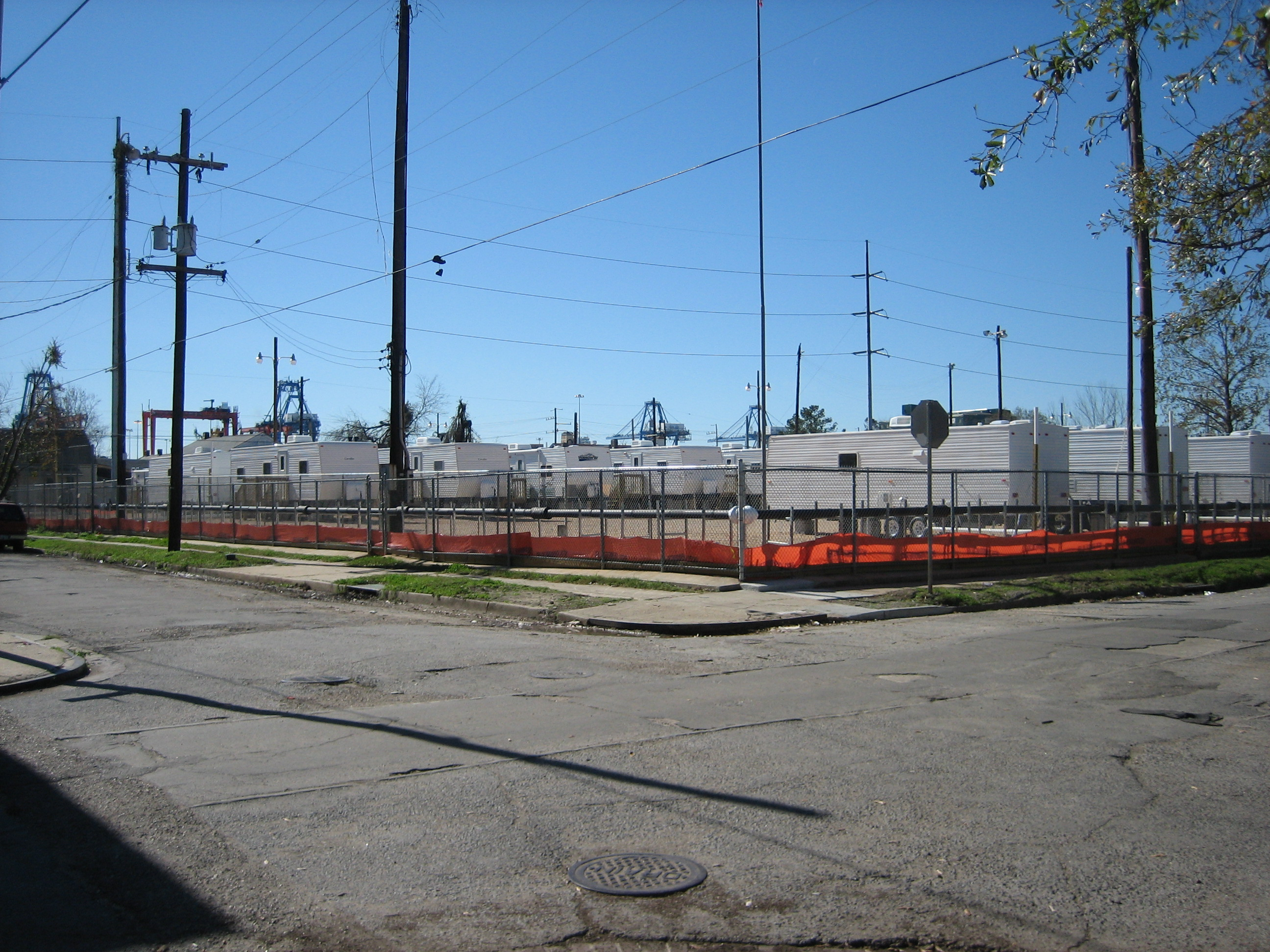
FEMA trailer park, in what had been a neighborhood playground.

FEMA requires that a property must have basic utilities including running water and power before a trailer can be installed. FEMA will not install trailers in neighborhoods that have no access to running water or electricity.

FEMA subcontracts the installation of FEMA trailers to numerous private contractors. First, a subcontractor installs the trailer itself. After this, other contractors install the access stairs or ramps, furniture, home appliances, and water. Next, the power company must be contacted to install a power line and power meter for the trailer. Finally, a FEMA inspector will inspect the trailer for safety compliance. Only after this lengthy process, will the occupant receive the keys for their trailer.

Many FEMA trailers are installed on the private property of homeowners, usually on lawns and sometimes in driveways next to the house. However, there are also numerous FEMA operated trailer parks where many storm victims have been living.

The trailer parks operated by FEMA range from small lots, consisting of a dozen trailers in the parking lots of office buildings and supermarkets, to several massive parks occupying large plots of land with hundreds of trailers. In some cases larger parks are surrounded by a chain-link fence and brightly lit. FEMA has also provided police security and controlled access to the larger parks. FEMA trailer parks have developed into small communities, with both the benefits and problems that are involved.

== Health problems ==
External media
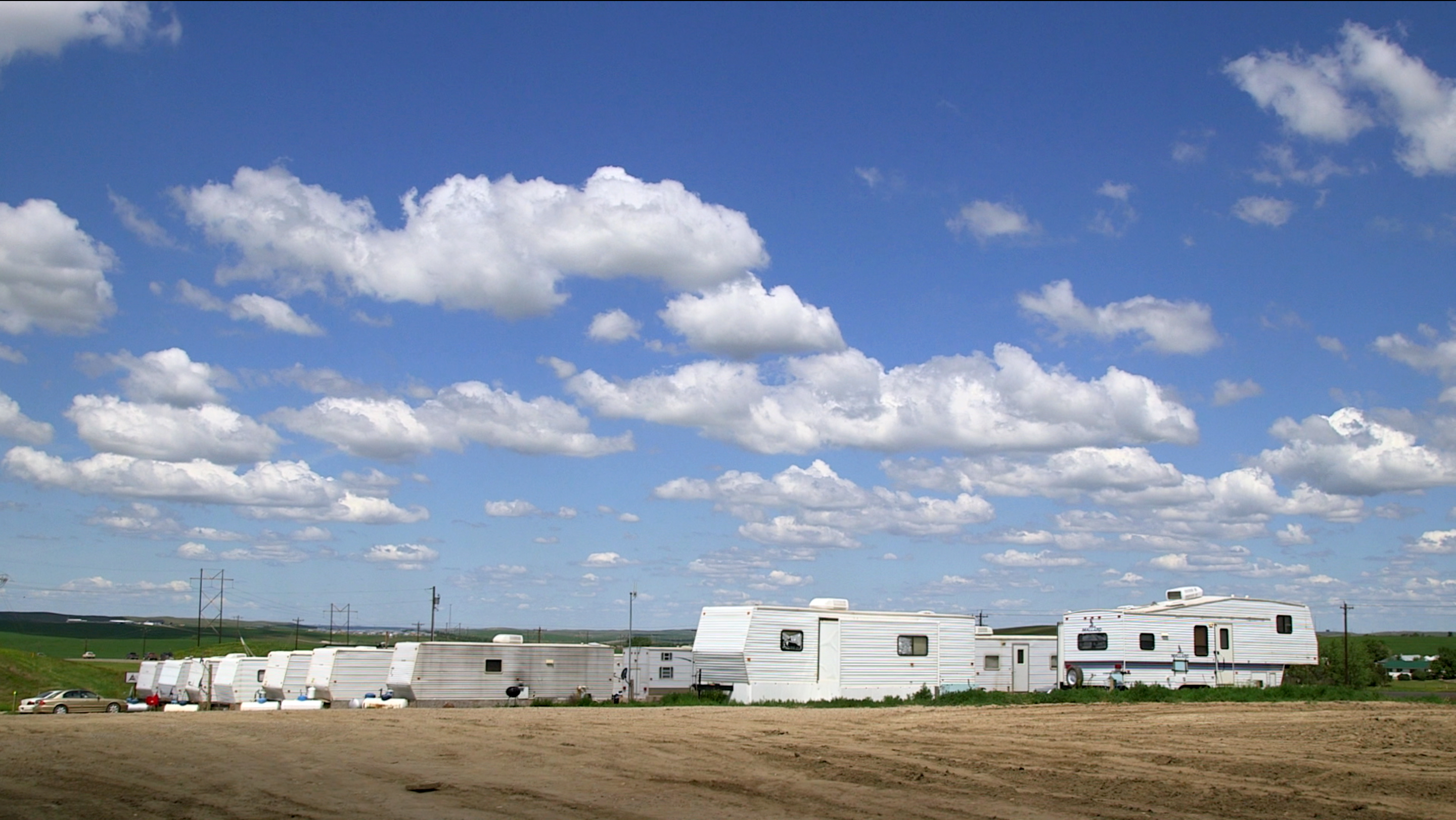

Audio
- "Episode 202: Where Have All the FEMA Trailers Gone? Tracing Toxicity from Bust to Boom", Distillations, September 2, 2015, Science History Institute

Video
- Where Have All the Trailers Gone?, Video by Mariel Carr (Videographer) & Nick Shapiro (Researcher), 2015, Science History Institute

Reports of health problems in the FEMA trailers deployed in 2005 had begun to appear by July 2006. Residents reported breathing difficulties, persistent flu-like symptoms, eye irritation, and nosebleeds. The cause was suspected to be high formaldehyde levels in the trailers. Formaldehyde was known to increase risk of cancer, asthma and other respiratory problems, and children and the elderly were at greater risk. As of 2008, FEMA was reported to have received 11,000 health complaints.

Scientists suspected that the rush to produce large numbers of trailers might have caused manufacturers to cut corners—using low-cost or poorly prepared materials such as glues and pressed wood in construction of the trailers, and resulting in high levels of formaldehyde emissions. In 2007, tests on a number of FEMA trailers by the Sierra Club showed 83% had levels of formaldehyde in the indoor air at levels above the EPA recommended limit. Congressmen Henry Waxman and Charlie Melancon requested that FEMA test the trailers and address the issue.

The United States Centers For Disease Control and Prevention (CDC) performed indoor air quality testing for formaldehyde in some of the units. On February 14, 2008, the CDC published a preliminary report confirming that potentially hazardous levels of formaldehyde were found in many of the travel trailers and manufactured homes provided by FEMA. In July 2008, researchers conducting a federally funded analysis reported that the toxic levels of formaldehyde were found in 42% of the trailers tested, and that they were attributable to faulty construction practices and the use of substandard building materials.

As a result, FEMA modified its specifications for emergency housing, requiring that units be larger and better ventilated. Construction of "manufactured homes" provided in New Jersey in 2012 was regulated by the U.S. Department of Housing and Urban Development. Researchers are also investigating possibilities for better disaster housing alternatives.

== Distribution and resale ==
On March 25, 2006, FEMA issued a news release requesting residents to call the FEMA Trailer Hotline to schedule removal of unneeded FEMA trailers after Katrina and Rita-related use.

In May 2009, FEMA sent eviction notices to residents in Mississippi who were living in FEMA trailers, sparking protests that the lack of available housing would result in them facing homelessness. Awareness of health concerns did not deter some residents, one of whom commented that "A dry roof over a toxic trailer beats no roof at all." On May 30, FEMA extended a deadline that would have evicted people from FEMA trailers. A FEMA spokesman said the organization was working with federal, state and local partners to help the residents get long-term housing.

On June 3, 2009, FEMA announced plans to virtually give away roughly 1,800 mobile homes to 3,400 families displaced by Hurricane Katrina who were living in government-provided housing along the Gulf Coast.

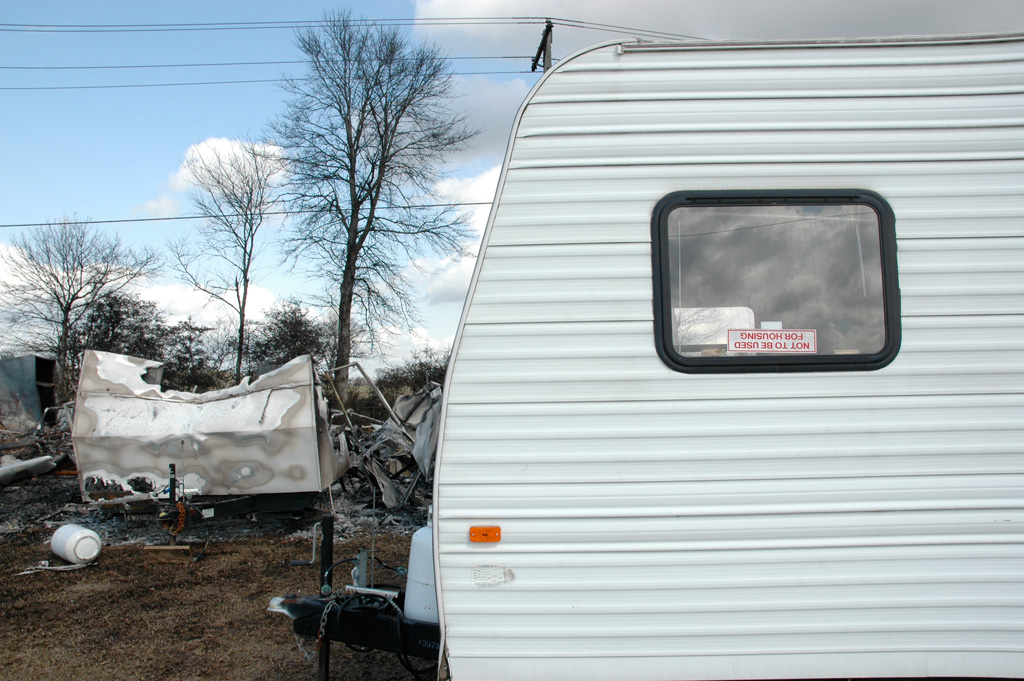
Sticker reads "NOT TO BE USED FOR HOUSING"

In 2010, the General Services Administration began holding mass public auctions of returned FEMA trailers. Units were marked with stickers that identified them as not suitable for housing, and buyers were required to sign a waiver agreeing that trailers would not be used as housing, and that new owners would be informed of the risks if the units were resold. The stickers are easy to remove, and Katrina FEMA trailers have been widely resold without any warning of possible health hazards. As many as 130,000 trailers are reported to have gone into the resale market, often in disaster zones and other places where there is strong demand for low-cost housing.

In Alabama and other parts of the South, after tornadoes caused widespread destruction in 2011, post-Katrina trailers were being sold for between $2,000 and $4,000 each. FEMA trailers have been sold to oil-field workers in areas such as North Dakota, where housing is in short supply. Trailers were also distributed to Native American reservations, including the Mescalero Apache in New Mexico, Standing Rock Sioux in North Dakota and South Dakota, the Cherokee in Oklahoma and the Oglala Sioux in South Dakota.

It is possible to determine whether a trailer was originally one of the Hurricane Katrina trailers by checking the vehicle's VIN. A number of resources have been suggested for those concerned about a FEMA trailer.

== Class-action settlements ==
As of 2012, U.S. District Judge Kurt D. Engelhardt of New Orleans approved a $42.6 million class-action lawsuit settlement. Plaintiffs, who included roughly 55,000 residents of Louisiana, Mississippi, Alabama and Texas, had alleged that the FEMA trailers emitted hazardous levels of the toxic chemical formaldehyde. The defendants included two dozen manufacturers who built mobile homes for the Federal Emergency Management Agency (FEMA), including Gulf Stream Coach Inc., Forest River Inc., Vanguard LLC and Monaco Coach Corp. A separate $5.1 million settlement dealt with claims against FEMA contractors including Shaw Environmental Inc., Bechtel Corp., Fluor Enterprises Inc. and CH2M Hill Constructors Inc., who were responsible for installing and maintaining the units.

== See also ==
- Container home
