= Political party strength in Louisiana =

Politics in the US state of Louisiana

== Party affiliation ==
=== Current ===
Party registration as of July 1, 2026
Party	Number of voters	Fraction
Republican	1,064,496	36.1%
Democratic	1,062,135	36.0%
No Party	820,040	27.8%
Other Parties	3,329	0.1%
Total	2,950,000	100.0%

== Electoral history ==
The following table indicates the party of elected officials in the U.S. state of Louisiana:

- Governor
- Lieutenant Governor
- Secretary of State
- Attorney General
- State Treasurer
- Auditor (until 1960) / Comptroller (1960–74; not an elected office after 1974)
- Commissioner of Agriculture and Forestry
- Commissioner of Insurance
- Commissioner of Elections (office abolished; in existence 1960–2004)

The table also indicates the historical party composition in the:

- State Senate
- State House of Representatives
- State delegation to the U.S. Senate
- State delegation to the U.S. House of Representatives

For years in which a presidential election was held, the table indicates which party's nominees received the state's electoral votes.

=== 1803–1903 ===
Year	Executive offices							State Legislature		United States Congress			Electoral votes
Year	Governor		Lt. Governor		Secretary of State	Attorney General	Treasurer	State Senate	State House	U.S. Senator (Class II)	U.S. Senator (Class III)	U.S. House	Electoral votes
1803	William C. C. Claiborne (DR) (Note: From 1804 to 1812, what would later become the State of Louisiana was known as the Territory of Orleans. The contemporary Louisiana Territory was to the north and did not include modern Louisiana.)		no such office		James Brown (DR)								
1804	William C. C. Claiborne (DR)		no such office				George W. Morgan						
1805	William C. C. Claiborne (DR)		no such office		John Graham (DR)		George W. Morgan						
1806	William C. C. Claiborne (DR)		no such office		John Graham (DR)	James Brown (DR)	George W. Morgan						
1807	William C. C. Claiborne (DR)		no such office		John Graham (DR)	James Brown (DR)	George W. Morgan						
1808	William C. C. Claiborne (DR)		no such office		John Graham (DR)	James Brown (DR)	George W. Morgan						
1809	William C. C. Claiborne (DR)		no such office		John Graham (DR)	François X. Martin (DR)	George W. Morgan						
1810	William C. C. Claiborne (DR)		no such office		Thomas B. Robertson (DR)	Louis Moreau-Lislet (DR)	George W. Morgan						
1811	William C. C. Claiborne (DR)		no such office		Thomas B. Robertson (DR)	Louis Moreau-Lislet (DR)	George W. Morgan						
1812	William C. C. Claiborne (DR)		no such office		Louis B. Macarty (DR) (Note: Appointed by governor.)	Louis Moreau-Lislet (DR)	J. Montegut (DR)	DR majority	DR majority	Jean Noël Destréhan (DR)	Allan B. Magruder (DR)	Thomas B. Robertson (DR)	Madison/ Gerry (DR) ✓
1812	William C. C. Claiborne (DR)		no such office		Louis B. Macarty (DR)	Louis Moreau-Lislet (DR)	J. Montegut (DR)	DR majority	DR majority	Thomas Posey (DR)	Allan B. Magruder (DR)	Thomas B. Robertson (DR)	Madison/ Gerry (DR) ✓
1813	William C. C. Claiborne (DR)		no such office		Louis B. Macarty (DR)	François X. Martin (DR)	J. Montegut (DR)	DR majority	DR majority	James Brown (DR)	Eligius Fromentin (DR)	Thomas B. Robertson (DR)	Madison/ Gerry (DR) ✓
1814	William C. C. Claiborne (DR)		no such office		Louis B. Macarty (DR)	François X. Martin (DR)	Jean Baptiste DeJean (DR)	DR majority	DR majority	James Brown (DR)	Eligius Fromentin (DR)	Thomas B. Robertson (DR)	Madison/ Gerry (DR) ✓
1815	William C. C. Claiborne (DR)		no such office		Louis B. Macarty (DR)	Étienne Mazureau (DR)	Jean Baptiste DeJean (DR)	DR majority	DR majority	James Brown (DR)	Eligius Fromentin (DR)	Thomas B. Robertson (DR)	Madison/ Gerry (DR) ✓
1816	William C. C. Claiborne (DR)		no such office		Louis B. Macarty (DR)	Étienne Mazureau (DR)	Jean Baptiste DeJean (DR)	DR majority	DR majority	James Brown (DR)	Eligius Fromentin (DR)	Thomas B. Robertson (DR)	Monroe/ Tompkins (DR) ✓
1817	Jacques Villeré (DR)		no such office		Étienne Mazureau (DR)	Louis Moreau-Lislet (DR)	Jean Baptiste DeJean (DR)	DR majority	DR majority	William C. C. Claiborne (DR)	Eligius Fromentin (DR)	Thomas B. Robertson (DR)	Monroe/ Tompkins (DR) ✓
1818	Jacques Villeré (DR)		no such office		Étienne Mazureau (DR)	Louis Moreau-Lislet (DR)	Silve Arnaud	DR majority	DR majority	William C. C. Claiborne (DR)	Eligius Fromentin (DR)	Thomas Butler (DR)	Monroe/ Tompkins (DR) ✓
1819	Jacques Villeré (DR)		no such office		Étienne Mazureau (DR)	Thomas B. Robertson (DR)	Silve Arnaud	DR majority	DR majority	Henry Johnson (DR) (Note: Resigned to become governor.)	James Brown (DR)	Thomas Butler (DR)	Monroe/ Tompkins (DR) ✓
1820	Jacques Villeré (DR)		no such office		Étienne Mazureau (DR)	Thomas B. Robertson (DR)	Silve Arnaud	DR majority	DR majority	Henry Johnson (DR)	James Brown (DR)	Thomas Butler (DR)	Monroe/ Tompkins (DR) ✓
1821	Thomas B. Robertson (DR) (Note: Resigned to take a seat on the United States District Court for the District of Louisiana.)		no such office		Pierre Derbigny (NR)	Étienne Mazureau (DR)	Silve Arnaud	DR majority	DR majority	Henry Johnson (DR)	James Brown (DR)	Josiah S. Johnston (DR)	Monroe/ Tompkins (DR) ✓
1822	Thomas B. Robertson (DR)		no such office		Pierre Derbigny (NR)	Étienne Mazureau (DR)	Silve Arnaud	DR majority	DR majority	Henry Johnson (DR)	James Brown (DR)	Josiah S. Johnston (DR)	Monroe/ Tompkins (DR) ✓
1823	Thomas B. Robertson (DR)		no such office		Pierre Derbigny (NR)	Étienne Mazureau (DR)	Silve Arnaud	NR majority	NR majority	Henry Johnson (DR)	James Brown (DR)	2NR, 1J	Monroe/ Tompkins (DR) ✓
1824	Thomas B. Robertson (DR)		no such office		Pierre Derbigny (NR)	Isaac Trimble Preston	Silve Arnaud	NR majority	NR majority	Dominique Bouligny (DR)	Josiah S. Johnston (DR)	2NR, 1J	Adams/ Calhoun (NR) ✓
1824	Henry S. Thibodaux (NR) (Note: As president of the state Senate, acted as governor for unexpired term.)		no such office		Pierre Derbigny (NR)	Isaac Trimble Preston	Silve Arnaud	NR majority	NR majority	Dominique Bouligny (NR)	Josiah S. Johnston (NR)	2NR, 1J	Adams/ Calhoun (NR) ✓
1825	Henry Johnson (NR)		no such office		Pierre Derbigny (NR)	Isaac Trimble Preston	Silve Arnaud	NR majority	NR majority	Dominique Bouligny (NR)	Josiah S. Johnston (NR)	2NR, 1J	Adams/ Calhoun (NR) ✓
1826	Henry Johnson (NR)		no such office		Pierre Derbigny (NR)	Isaac Trimble Preston	Silve Arnaud	NR majority	NR majority	Dominique Bouligny (NR)	Josiah S. Johnston (NR)	2NR, 1J	Adams/ Calhoun (NR) ✓
1827	Henry Johnson (NR)		no such office		Pierre Derbigny (NR)	Isaac Trimble Preston	Silve Arnaud	NR majority	J majority	Dominique Bouligny (NR)	Josiah S. Johnston (NR)	2NR, 1J	Adams/ Calhoun (NR) ✓
1828	Henry Johnson (NR)		no such office		Pierre Derbigny (NR)	Alonzo Morphy	François Gardere	NR majority	J majority	Dominique Bouligny (NR)	Josiah S. Johnston (NR)	2NR, 1J	Jackson/ Calhoun (J) ✓
1829	Pierre Derbigny (NR) (Note: Died in office.)		no such office		George A. Waggaman (NR)	Alonzo Morphy	François Gardere	11W, 6D, 1?	26W, 21D, 3?	Edward Livingston (J)	Josiah S. Johnston (NR)	1J, 1W, 1NR	Jackson/ Calhoun (J) ✓
1829	Arnaud Beauvais (NR) (Note: As president of the state Senate, acted as governor until his term as Senate president expired.)		no such office		George A. Waggaman (NR)	Alonzo Morphy	François Gardere	11W, 6D, 1?	26W, 21D, 3?	Edward Livingston (J)	Josiah S. Johnston (NR)	1J, 1W, 1NR	Jackson/ Calhoun (J) ✓
1830	Jacques Dupré (NR)		no such office		George A. Waggaman (NR)	George Eustis Sr. (W)	François Gardere	11W, 6D, 1?	26W, 21D, 3?	Edward Livingston (J)	Josiah S. Johnston (NR)	1J, 1W, 1NR	Jackson/ Calhoun (J) ✓
1831	André B. Roman (W)		no such office		George A. Waggaman (NR)	George Eustis Sr. (W)	François Gardere	W majority	W majority (Note: Elected a Democrat, Alexandre Mouton, as a minority-party Speaker.)	Edward Livingston (J)	Josiah S. Johnston (NR)	1J, 1W, 1NR	Jackson/ Calhoun (J) ✓
1832	André B. Roman (W)		no such office		George Eustis Sr. (W)	George Eustis Sr. (W)	François Gardere	W majority	W majority	George A. Waggaman (NR)	Josiah S. Johnston (NR)	1J, 1W, 1NR	Jackson/ Van Buren (J) ✓
1833	André B. Roman (W)		no such office		George Eustis Sr. (W)	Étienne Mazureau (W)	François Gardere	W majority	D majority	George A. Waggaman (NR)	Alexander Porter (NR)	1J, 1W, 1NR	Jackson/ Van Buren (J) ✓
1834	André B. Roman (W)		no such office		George Eustis Sr. (W)	Étienne Mazureau (W)	François Gardere	W majority	D majority	George A. Waggaman (NR)	Alexander Porter (NR)	1J, 1W, 1NR	Jackson/ Van Buren (J) ✓
1835	Edward D. White Sr. (W)		no such office		Martin Blache	Étienne Mazureau (W)	François Gardere	W majority	W majority (Note: Elected a Democrat, Alcée Louis la Branche, as a minority-party Speaker.)	George A. Waggaman (NR)	Alexander Porter (NR)	1J, 1W, 1NR	Jackson/ Van Buren (J) ✓
1836	Edward D. White Sr. (W)		no such office		Martin Blache	Étienne Mazureau (W)	François Gardere	W majority	W majority	Robert C. Nicholas (J)	Alexander Porter (NR)	1J, 1W, 1NR	Van Buren/ Johnson (D) ✓
1837	Edward D. White Sr. (W)		no such office		William C. C. Claiborne Jr.	Étienne Mazureau (W)	François Gardere	D majority	D majority	Robert C. Nicholas (D)	Alexandre Mouton (D)	2W, 1J	Van Buren/ Johnson (D) ✓
1838	Edward D. White Sr. (W)		no such office		Alfred E. Forstall	Étienne Mazureau (W)	François Gardere	D majority	D majority	Robert C. Nicholas (D)	Alexandre Mouton (D)	2W, 1J	Van Buren/ Johnson (D) ✓
1839	André B. Roman (W)		no such office		Henry A. Bullard (W)	Étienne Mazureau (W)	François Gardere	10W, 7D (Note: May have been 11W, 6D.)	31W, 17D, 2I	Robert C. Nicholas (D)	Alexandre Mouton (D)	3W	Van Buren/ Johnson (D) ✓
1840	André B. Roman (W)		no such office		William Pierce (W)	Étienne Mazureau (W)	François Gardere	10W, 7D	31W, 17D, 2I	Robert C. Nicholas (D)	Alexandre Mouton (D)	3W	Harrison/ Tyler (W) ✓
1841	André B. Roman (W)		no such office		William Pierce (W)	Christian Roselius (W)	William DeBuys (W)	8W, 8D, 1? (Note: A Whig, Felix Garcia, was elected as Senate President.)	26W, 14D, 10?	Alexander Barrow (W)	Charles Magill Conrad (W)	2W, 1D	Harrison/ Tyler (W) ✓
1842	André B. Roman (W)		no such office		William Pierce (W)	Christian Roselius (W)	William DeBuys (W)	8W, 8D, 1?	26W, 14D, 10?	Alexander Barrow (W)	Charles Magill Conrad (W)	2W, 1D	Harrison/ Tyler (W) ✓
1843	Alexandre Mouton (D)		no such office		William Pierce (W)	Isaac Trimble Preston	William DeBuys (W)	9W, 8D	34W, 26D	Alexander Barrow (W)	Henry Johnson (W)	4D	Harrison/ Tyler (W) ✓
1844	Alexandre Mouton (D)		no such office		William Pierce (W)	Isaac Trimble Preston	William DeBuys (W)	9W, 8D	34W, 26D	Alexander Barrow (W)	Henry Johnson (W)	4D	Polk/ Dallas (D) ✓
1845	Alexandre Mouton (D)		no such office		William Pierce (W)	Isaac Trimble Preston	William DeBuys (W)	9D, 8W	34W, 26D	Pierre Soulé (D)	Henry Johnson (W)	4D	Polk/ Dallas (D) ✓
1846	Isaac Johnson (D)		no such office		Charles Gayarré (D)	William Augustus Elmore (D)	Joseph Marshall Walker (D)	9D, 8W	34W, 26D	Pierre Soulé (D)	Henry Johnson (W)	4D	Polk/ Dallas (D) ✓
1847	Isaac Johnson (D)		no such office		Charles Gayarré (D)	William Augustus Elmore (D)	Joseph Marshall Walker (D)	20D, 12W (Note: With the Constitution of 1845 going into effect, each legislator elected in 1846 only served a one-year term.)	55D, 43W	Solomon W. Downs (D)	Henry Johnson (W)	4D	Polk/ Dallas (D) ✓
1848	Isaac Johnson (D)		no such office		Charles Gayarré (D)	William Augustus Elmore (D)	Joseph Marshall Walker (D)	17D, 15W	51W, 47D	Solomon W. Downs (D)	Henry Johnson (W)	4D	Taylor/ Fillmore (W) ✓
1849	Isaac Johnson (D)		no such office		Charles Gayarré (D)	William Augustus Elmore (D)	P. E. D. Livaudais (D)	17D, 15W	51W, 47D	Solomon W. Downs (D)	Pierre Soulé (D)	3D, 1W	Taylor/ Fillmore (W) ✓
1850	Joseph Marshall Walker (D)		no such office		Charles Gayarré (D)	Isaac Johnson (D)	Charles Greneaux (D)	18D, 14W	54W, 43D	Solomon W. Downs (D)	Pierre Soulé (D)	3D, 1W	Taylor/ Fillmore (W) ✓
1851	Joseph Marshall Walker (D)		no such office		Charles Gayarré (D)	Isaac Johnson (D)	Charles Greneaux (D)	18D, 14W	54W, 43D	Solomon W. Downs (D)	Pierre Soulé (D)	2D, 2W	Taylor/ Fillmore (W) ✓
1852	Joseph Marshall Walker (D)		no such office		Charles Gayarré (D)	Isaac Johnson (D)	George C. McWhorter (D)	16D, 16W (Note: The Lt. Governor, Jean Baptiste Plauché, broke the tie and the Democrats organized the chamber.)	53W, 44D	Solomon W. Downs (D)	Pierre Soulé (D)	2D, 2W	Pierce/ King (D) ✓
1853	Paul Octave Hébert (D)		William Wood Farmer (D)		Andrew S. Herron (D)	Isaac Johnson (D)	George C. McWhorter (D)	19W, 17D (Note: With the Constitution of 1852 going into effect, each legislator elected that year only served a one-year term.)	50D, 41KN	Judah P. Benjamin (W)	Pierre Soulé (D)	4D	Pierce/ King (D) ✓
1854	Paul Octave Hébert (D)		William Wood Farmer (D)		Andrew S. Herron (D)	Isaac E. Morse (D)	George C. McWhorter (D)	20D, 12W	60D, 37W	Judah P. Benjamin (W)	John Slidell (D)	4D	Pierce/ King (D) ✓
1855	Paul Octave Hébert (D)		Robert C. Wickliffe (D)		Andrew S. Herron (D)	Isaac E. Morse (D)	Robert A. Hunter (D)	20D, 12W	60D, 37W	Judah P. Benjamin (W)	John Slidell (D)	3D, 1KN	Pierce/ King (D) ✓
1856	Robert C. Wickliffe (D)		Charles Homer Mouton (D)		Andrew S. Herron (D)	Edwin Warren Moïse (D)	Robert A. Hunter (D)	18D, 12KN, 1AA, 1 vac.	47D, 41KN	Judah P. Benjamin (W)	John Slidell (D)	3D, 1KN	Buchanan/ Breckinridge (D) ✓
1857	Robert C. Wickliffe (D)		Charles Homer Mouton (D)		Andrew S. Herron (D)	Edwin Warren Moïse (D)	Robert A. Hunter (D)	18D, 12KN, 1AA, 1 vac.	47D, 41KN	Judah P. Benjamin (W)	John Slidell (D)	3D, 1KN	Buchanan/ Breckinridge (D) ✓
1858	Robert C. Wickliffe (D)		Charles Homer Mouton (D)		Andrew S. Herron (D)	Edwin Warren Moïse (D)	Robert A. Hunter (D)	23D, 9KN	49D, 37KN, 1IW, 1 tie	Judah P. Benjamin (W)	John Slidell (D)	3D, 1KN	Buchanan/ Breckinridge (D) ✓
1859	Robert C. Wickliffe (D)		William F. Griffin (D)		Andrew S. Herron (D)	Edwin Warren Moïse (D)	Robert A. Hunter (D)	23D, 9KN	49D, 37KN, 1IW, 1 tie	Judah P. Benjamin (D)	John Slidell (D)	3D, 1KN	Buchanan/ Breckinridge (D) ✓
1860	Thomas O. Moore (D)		Henry M. Hyams (D)		Pliny D. Hardy (D)	Thomas Jenkins Semmes (D)	B. L. DeFreeze (D)	21D, 6KN, 3O, 1I, 1 vac.	59D, 18KN, 9O, 9I, 3?	Judah P. Benjamin (D)	John Slidell (D)	3D, 1KN	Breckinridge/ Lane (SD) ✗
1861	Thomas O. Moore (D)		Henry M. Hyams (D)		Pliny D. Hardy (D)	Thomas Jenkins Semmes (D)	B. L. DeFreeze (D)	21D, 6KN, 3O, 1I, 1 vac.	59D, 18KN, 9O, 9I, 3?	American Civil War			Breckinridge/ Lane (SD) ✗
1862	Thomas O. Moore (D)		Henry M. Hyams (D) (Note: Of Confederate-held territory in Louisiana.)	James Madison; Wells (UD) (Note: Of Union-held territory in Louisiana.)	Pliny D. Hardy (D)	Thomas Jenkins Semmes (D)	B. L. DeFreeze (D)	American Civil War		American Civil War			Breckinridge/ Lane (SD) ✗
1862	Thomas O. Moore (D)	George Foster; Shepley (M/D)	Henry M. Hyams (D)	James Madison; Wells (UD)	Pliny D. Hardy (D)	Thomas Jenkins Semmes (D)	B. L. DeFreeze (D)	American Civil War		American Civil War			Breckinridge/ Lane (SD) ✗
1863	Thomas O. Moore (D)	George Foster; Shepley (M/D)	Henry M. Hyams (D)	James Madison; Wells (UD)	Pliny D. Hardy (D)	Thomas Jenkins Semmes (D)	B. L. DeFreeze (D)	American Civil War		American Civil War			Breckinridge/ Lane (SD) ✗
1864	Thomas O. Moore (D)	George Foster; Shepley (M/D)	Benjamin W. Pearce (D)	Albert Voorhies (D)	Pliny D. Hardy (D)	F. S. Goode (D)	B. L. DeFreeze (D)	American Civil War		American Civil War			No Electors Counted
1864	Henry Allen (D) (Note: Removed from office after the Union took control of Louisiana following the surrender of the Confederacy; moved to Mexico City.)	Michael Hahn (U) (Note: Resigned to take a seat in the United States Senate, but was denied his seat, Louisiana having not yet been readmitted to the Union.)	Benjamin W. Pearce (D)	Albert Voorhies (D)	Pliny D. Hardy (D)	F. S. Goode (D)	B. L. DeFreeze (D)	American Civil War		American Civil War			No Electors Counted
1865	Henry Allen (D)	Michael Hahn (U)	Benjamin W. Pearce (D)	Albert Voorhies (D)	Pliny D. Hardy (D)	F. S. Goode (D)	B. L. DeFreeze (D)	American Civil War		American Civil War			No Electors Counted
1865	James Madison Wells (UD) (Note: As lieutenant governor, acted as governor for unexpired term.) (Note: Reconstruction-era governor subordinate to U.S. military rule.) (Note: Removed from office by General Philip Sheridan, who held Wells accountable for the unstable political conditions stemming from the granting of suffrage to Blacks.)		Benjamin W. Pearce (D)	Albert Voorhies (D)	Stanislas Wrotnowski (UD)	F. S. Goode (D)	Adam Giffin (UD)	American Civil War		American Civil War			No Electors Counted
1866	James Madison Wells (UD)		vacant		Stanislas Wrotnowski (UD)	Andrew S. Herron (D)	Adam Giffin (UD)	32N	98N	American Civil War			No Electors Counted
1867	James Madison Wells (UD)		vacant		Stanislas Wrotnowski (UD)	Andrew S. Herron (D)	Adam Giffin (UD)	32N	98N	American Civil War			No Electors Counted
1867	Benjamin Flanders (R) (Note: Appointed military governor.) (Note: Resigned.)		vacant		George E. Bovee (R) (Note: Was removed from office by Governor Warmoth for misfeasance.)	B. L. Lynch (R)	Adam Giffin (UD)	32N	98N	John S. Harris (R)	William Pitt Kellogg (R)	3R, 1D, 1 vac.	No Electors Counted
1868	Joshua Baker (UD) (Note: When Louisiana was readmitted to the Union, Baker and General Winfield Scott Hancock, who had appointed him, were removed from power in the state.)		Oscar Dunn (R)		George E. Bovee (R)	B. L. Lynch (R)	Antoine Dubuclet (R)	32N	98N	John S. Harris (R)	William Pitt Kellogg (R)	3R, 1D, 1 vac.	Seymour/ Blair (D) ✗
1868	Henry C. Warmoth (R) (Note: Impeached but never convicted; however, Warmoth was still removed from office with 35 days remaining in his term. All charges were later expunged.)		Oscar Dunn (R)		George E. Bovee (R)	B. L. Lynch (R)	Antoine Dubuclet (R)	32N	98N	John S. Harris (R)	William Pitt Kellogg (R)	3R, 1D, 1 vac.	Seymour/ Blair (D) ✗
1869	Henry C. Warmoth (R)		Oscar Dunn (R)		George E. Bovee (R)	Simeon Beldon (R)	Antoine Dubuclet (R)	20R, 16D	56R, 45D	John S. Harris (R)	William Pitt Kellogg (R)	4R, 1 vac.	Seymour/ Blair (D) ✗
1870	Henry C. Warmoth (R)		Oscar Dunn (R)		George E. Bovee (R)	Simeon Beldon (R)	Antoine Dubuclet (R)	20R, 16D	56R, 45D	John S. Harris (R)	William Pitt Kellogg (R)	5R	Seymour/ Blair (D) ✗
1871	Henry C. Warmoth (R)		Oscar Dunn (R)		George E. Bovee (R)	Simeon Beldon (R)	Antoine Dubuclet (R)	29R, 7D	74R, 29D, 2 vac.	J. R. West (R)	William Pitt Kellogg (R)	5R	Seymour/ Blair (D) ✗
1872	Henry C. Warmoth (R)		P. B. S. Pinchback (R)		George E. Bovee (R)	Simeon Beldon (R)	Antoine Dubuclet (R)	29R, 7D	74R, 29D, 2 vac.	J. R. West (R)	William Pitt Kellogg (R)	5R	Seymour/ Blair (D) ✗
1872	P. B. S. Pinchback (R)		vacant		Francis J. Herron (R)	Simeon Beldon (R)	Antoine Dubuclet (R)	29R, 7D	74R, 29D, 2 vac.	J. R. West (R)	vacant	5R	Grant/ Wilson (R) ✓
1873	John McEnery (D) (Note: The State Returning Board declared McEnery the winner over William Pitt Kellogg in 1872, but a second election board was formed that declared Kellogg the winner. Both men were sworn into office on the same day by opposing legislatures. After armed skirmishes erupted, President Ulysses S. Grant stepped in, declaring Kellogg the winner on September 20, 1873.)	William Pitt; Kellogg (R)	Caesar Antoine (R)		Jack Wharton (R)	Alexander Pope Field (R)	Antoine Dubuclet (R)	disputed (Note: Due to the opposing election boards, two separate and competing legislatures were sworn in: one Democratic, and one Republican)	disputed	J. R. West (R)	vacant	6R	Grant/ Wilson (R) ✓
1873	William Pitt Kellogg (R)		Caesar Antoine (R)		Jack Wharton (R)	Alexander Pope Field (R)	Antoine Dubuclet (R)	disputed	disputed	J. R. West (R)	vacant	6R	Grant/ Wilson (R) ✓
1874	William Pitt Kellogg (R)		Caesar Antoine (R)		Pierre G. Deslondes (R)	Alexander Pope Field (R)	Antoine Dubuclet (R)	disputed	disputed	J. R. West (R)	vacant	6R	Grant/ Wilson (R) ✓
1875	William Pitt Kellogg (R)		Caesar Antoine (R)		Pierre G. Deslondes (R)	Alexander Pope Field (R)	Antoine Dubuclet (R)	27R, 9D (Note: To resolve the conflict with the two competing legislatures in what was known as the Wheeler Compromise, control of the Senate was given to the Republicans and control of the House was given to the Democrats.)	63D, 47R	J. R. West (R)	vacant	3D, 3R	Grant/ Wilson (R) ✓
1876	William Pitt Kellogg (R)		Caesar Antoine (R)		Pierre G. Deslondes (R)	William H. Hunt (R)	Antoine Dubuclet (R)	27R, 9D	63D, 47R	J. R. West (R)	James B. Eustis (D)	4D, 2R	Hayes/ Wheeler (R) ✓
1877	Stephen B. Packard (R) (Note: Packard was the Radical Republican candidate for governor in 1876. In a disputed outcome, both Packard and his Democratic opponent, Francis T. Nicholls, were inaugurated. Nicholls had led in the balloting by eight thousand votes, but the Republican-controlled State Returning Board cited fraud and declared Packard the victor. Former governor P. B. S. Pinchback, however, refused to support fellow Republican Packard, and instead endorsed Nicholls.)	Francis T. Nicholls (D) (Note: Won the 1876 election over Stephen B. Packard, but the Republican-controlled State Returning Board declared Packard the winner. Nicholls took office anyway and assembled a government that was eventually recognized by the federal government as the proper state government.)	Louis A. Wiltz (D)		Pierre G. Deslondes (R)	Hiram R. Steele (D)	Antoine Dubuclet (R)	20D, 16R	64D, 42R, 4 vac.	William Pitt Kellogg (R)	James B. Eustis (D)	4D, 2R	Hayes/ Wheeler (R) ✓
1877	Francis T. Nicholls (D)		Louis A. Wiltz (D)		Pierre G. Deslondes (R)	Hiram R. Steele (D)	Antoine Dubuclet (R)	20D, 16R	64D, 42R, 4 vac.	William Pitt Kellogg (R)	James B. Eustis (D)	4D, 2R	Hayes/ Wheeler (R) ✓
1878	Francis T. Nicholls (D)		Louis A. Wiltz (D)		Will A. Strong (D)	Horatio Nash Ogden (D)	Edward A. Burke (D)	20D, 16R	64D, 42R, 4 vac.	William Pitt Kellogg (R)	James B. Eustis (D)	6D	Hayes/ Wheeler (R) ✓
1879	Francis T. Nicholls (D)		Louis A. Wiltz (D)		Will A. Strong (D)	Horatio Nash Ogden (D)	Edward A. Burke (D)	26D, 10R	75D, 16R, 2GB, 1I	William Pitt Kellogg (R)	Benjamin F. Jonas (D)	6D	Hayes/ Wheeler (R) ✓
1880	Louis A. Wiltz (D)		Samuel D. McEnery (D)		Will A. Strong (D)	Horatio Nash Ogden (D)	Edward A. Burke (D)	26D, 10R	75D, 16R, 2GB, 1I	William Pitt Kellogg (R)	Benjamin F. Jonas (D)	6D	Hancock/ English (D) ✗
1881	Louis A. Wiltz (D)		William A. Robertson (D)		Will A. Strong (D)	James C. Egan (D)	Edward A. Burke (D)	32D, 4R (Note: Starting with this election, senators and representatives were all elected at the same time to 4-year terms.)	74D, 24R	William Pitt Kellogg (R)	Benjamin F. Jonas (D)	6D	Hancock/ English (D) ✗
1881	Samuel D. McEnery (D) (Note: As lieutenant governor, acted as governor for unexpired term and was later elected in his own right.)		William A. Robertson (D)		Will A. Strong (D)	James C. Egan (D)	Edward A. Burke (D)	32D, 4R	74D, 24R	William Pitt Kellogg (R)	Benjamin F. Jonas (D)	5D, 1R	Hancock/ English (D) ✗
1882	Samuel D. McEnery (D)		George L. Walton (D)		Will A. Strong (D)	James C. Egan (D)	Edward A. Burke (D)	32D, 4R	74D, 24R	William Pitt Kellogg (R)	Benjamin F. Jonas (D)	5D, 1R	Hancock/ English (D) ✗
1883	Samuel D. McEnery (D)		George L. Walton (D)		Will A. Strong (D)	James C. Egan (D)	Edward A. Burke (D)	32D, 4R	74D, 24R	Randall L. Gibson (D)	Benjamin F. Jonas (D)	5D, 1R	Hancock/ English (D) ✗
1884	Samuel D. McEnery (D)		Clay Knobloch (D)		Oscar Arroyo (D)	Joe Cunningham (D)	Edward A. Burke (D)	31D, 5R (Note: Due to a state constitutional amendment, elections to the legislature were moved up to April every fourth year.)	85D, 13R	Randall L. Gibson (D)	Benjamin F. Jonas (D)	5D, 1R	Cleveland/ Hendricks (D) ✓
1885	Samuel D. McEnery (D)		Clay Knobloch (D)		Oscar Arroyo (D)	Joe Cunningham (D)	Edward A. Burke (D)	31D, 5R	85D, 13R	Randall L. Gibson (D)	James B. Eustis (D)	5D, 1R	Cleveland/ Hendricks (D) ✓
1886	Samuel D. McEnery (D)		Clay Knobloch (D)		Oscar Arroyo (D)	Joe Cunningham (D)	Edward A. Burke (D)	31D, 5R	85D, 13R	Randall L. Gibson (D)	James B. Eustis (D)	6D	Cleveland/ Hendricks (D) ✓
1887	Samuel D. McEnery (D)		Clay Knobloch (D)		Oscar Arroyo (D)	Joe Cunningham (D)	Edward A. Burke (D)	31D, 5R	85D, 13R	Randall L. Gibson (D)	James B. Eustis (D)	6D	Cleveland/ Hendricks (D) ✓
1888	Francis T. Nicholls (D)		James Jeffries (D)		Leonard F. Mason (D)	Walter H. Rogers (D)	William Henry Pipes (D)	33D, 5R	86D, 12R	Randall L. Gibson (D)	James B. Eustis (D)	6D	Cleveland/ Thurman (D) ✗
1889	Francis T. Nicholls (D)		James Jeffries (D)		Leonard F. Mason (D)	Walter H. Rogers (D)	William Henry Pipes (D)	33D, 5R	86D, 12R	Randall L. Gibson (D)	James B. Eustis (D)	5D, 1R	Cleveland/ Thurman (D) ✗
1890	Francis T. Nicholls (D)		James Jeffries (D)		Leonard F. Mason (D)	Walter H. Rogers (D)	William Henry Pipes (D)	33D, 5R	86D, 12R	Randall L. Gibson (D)	James B. Eustis (D)	5D, 1R	Cleveland/ Thurman (D) ✗
1891	Francis T. Nicholls (D)		James Jeffries (D)		Leonard F. Mason (D)	Walter H. Rogers (D)	William Henry Pipes (D)	33D, 5R	86D, 12R	Randall L. Gibson (D)	Edward Douglass White (D)	6D	Cleveland/ Thurman (D) ✗
1892	Murphy J. Foster (D)		Charles Parlange (D)		T. S. Adams (D)	Joe Cunningham (D)	John Pickett(D)	38D	96D, 2R	Donelson Caffery (D)	Edward Douglass White (D)	6D	Cleveland/ Stevenson (D) ✓
1893	Murphy J. Foster (D)		Hiram R. Lott (D)		T. S. Adams (D)	Joe Cunningham (D)	John Pickett(D)	38D	96D, 2R	Donelson Caffery (D)	Edward Douglass White (D)	6D	Cleveland/ Stevenson (D) ✓
1894	Murphy J. Foster (D)		Hiram R. Lott (D)		T. S. Adams (D)	Joe Cunningham (D)	John Pickett(D)	38D	96D, 2R	Donelson Caffery (D)	Newton C. Blanchard (D)	6D	Cleveland/ Stevenson (D) ✓
1895	Murphy J. Foster (D)		Robert H. Snyder (D)		T. S. Adams (D)	Joe Cunningham (D)	John Pickett(D)	38D	96D, 2R	Donelson Caffery (D)	Newton C. Blanchard (D)	6D	Cleveland/ Stevenson (D) ✓
1896	Murphy J. Foster (D)		Robert H. Snyder (D)		John T. Michel (D)	Joe Cunningham (D)	Alexander V. Fournet (D)	32D, 4R, 2Pop	60D, 24R, 14Pop	Donelson Caffery (D)	Newton C. Blanchard (D)	6D	4 – Bryan/ Sewall (D) ✗ 4 – Bryan/ Watson (Pop) ✗
1897	Murphy J. Foster (D)		Robert H. Snyder (D)		John T. Michel (D)	Joe Cunningham (D)	Alexander V. Fournet (D)	32D, 4R, 2Pop	60D, 24R, 14Pop	Donelson Caffery (D)	Samuel D. McEnery (D)	6D	4 – Bryan/ Sewall (D) ✗ 4 – Bryan/ Watson (Pop) ✗
1898	Murphy J. Foster (D)		Robert H. Snyder (D)		John T. Michel (D)	Joe Cunningham (D)	Alexander V. Fournet (D)	32D, 4R, 2Pop	60D, 24R, 14Pop	Donelson Caffery (D)	Samuel D. McEnery (D)	6D	4 – Bryan/ Sewall (D) ✗ 4 – Bryan/ Watson (Pop) ✗
1899	Murphy J. Foster (D)		Robert H. Snyder (D)		John T. Michel (D)	Joe Cunningham (D)	Alexander V. Fournet (D)	32D, 4R, 2Pop	60D, 24R, 14Pop	Donelson Caffery (D)	Samuel D. McEnery (D)	6D	4 – Bryan/ Sewall (D) ✗ 4 – Bryan/ Watson (Pop) ✗
1900	William Wright Heard (D)		Albert Estopinal (D)		John T. Michel (D)	Walter Guion (D)	LeDoux E. Smith (D)	39D	98D	Donelson Caffery (D)	Samuel D. McEnery (D)	6D	Bryan/ Stevenson (D) ✗
1901	William Wright Heard (D)		Albert Estopinal (D)		John T. Michel (D)	Walter Guion (D)	LeDoux E. Smith (D)	39D	98D	Murphy J. Foster (D)	Samuel D. McEnery (D)	6D	Bryan/ Stevenson (D) ✗
1902	William Wright Heard (D)		Albert Estopinal (D)		John T. Michel (D)	Walter Guion (D)	LeDoux E. Smith (D)	39D	98D	Murphy J. Foster (D)	Samuel D. McEnery (D)	6D	Bryan/ Stevenson (D) ✗
1903	William Wright Heard (D)		H. C. Cage (D)		John T. Michel (D)	Walter Guion (D)	LeDoux E. Smith (D)	39D	98D	Murphy J. Foster (D)	Samuel D. McEnery (D)	7D	Bryan/ Stevenson (D) ✗

=== 1904–1951 ===
Year	Executive offices								State Legislature		United States Congress			Electoral votes
Year	Governor	Lt. Governor	Secretary of State	Attorney General	Treasurer	Ag. & Forest Comm.	Register of Lands	Supt. of Education	State Senate	State House	U.S. Senator (Class II)	U.S. Senator (Class III)	U.S. House	Electoral votes
1904	Newton C. Blanchard (D)	Jared Y. Sanders Sr. (D)	John T. Michel (D)	Walter Guion (D)	James M. Smith (D)			James Benjamin; Aswell (D)	39D	98D	Murphy J. Foster (D)	Samuel D. McEnery (D)	7D	Parker/ Davis (D) ✗
1905	Newton C. Blanchard (D)	Jared Y. Sanders Sr. (D)	John T. Michel (D)	Walter Guion (D)	James M. Smith (D)			James Benjamin; Aswell (D)	39D	98D	Murphy J. Foster (D)	Samuel D. McEnery (D)	7D	Parker/ Davis (D) ✗
1906	Newton C. Blanchard (D)	Jared Y. Sanders Sr. (D)	John T. Michel (D)	Walter Guion (D)	James M. Smith (D)			James Benjamin; Aswell (D)	39D	98D	Murphy J. Foster (D)	Samuel D. McEnery (D)	7D	Parker/ Davis (D) ✗
1907	Newton C. Blanchard (D)	Jared Y. Sanders Sr. (D)	John T. Michel (D)	Walter Guion (D)	James M. Smith (D)			James Benjamin; Aswell (D)	39D	98D	Murphy J. Foster (D)	Samuel D. McEnery (D)	7D	Parker/ Davis (D) ✗
1908	Jared Y. Sanders Sr. (D) (Note: Elected to the United States Senate but refused the seat, choosing to remain governor.)	Paul M. Lambremont (D)	John T. Michel (D)	Walter Guion (D)	O. B. Steele (D)		Fred J. Grace	T. H. Harris (D)	41D	114D	Murphy J. Foster (D)	Samuel D. McEnery (D)	7D	Bryan/ Kern (D) ✗
1909	Jared Y. Sanders Sr. (D)	Paul M. Lambremont (D)	John T. Michel (D)	Walter Guion (D)	O. B. Steele (D)		Fred J. Grace	T. H. Harris (D)	41D	114D	Murphy J. Foster (D)	Samuel D. McEnery (D)	7D	Bryan/ Kern (D) ✗
1910	Jared Y. Sanders Sr. (D)	Paul M. Lambremont (D)	John T. Michel (D)	Walter Guion (D)	O. B. Steele (D)		Fred J. Grace	T. H. Harris (D)	41D	114D	Murphy J. Foster (D)	John Thornton (D)	7D	Bryan/ Kern (D) ✗
1911	Jared Y. Sanders Sr. (D)	Paul M. Lambremont (D)	John T. Michel (D)	Walter Guion (D)	O. B. Steele (D)		Fred J. Grace	T. H. Harris (D)	41D	114D	Murphy J. Foster (D)	John Thornton (D)	7D	Bryan/ Kern (D) ✗
1912	Luther E. Hall (D)	Thomas C. Barret (D)	Alvin Hebert (D)	Ruffin G. Pleasant (D)	LeDoux E. Smith (D)		Fred J. Grace	T. H. Harris (D)	39D, 2I	118D	Murphy J. Foster (D)	John Thornton (D)	7D	Wilson/ Marshall (D) ✓
1913	Luther E. Hall (D)	Thomas C. Barret (D)	Alvin Hebert (D)	Ruffin G. Pleasant (D)	LeDoux E. Smith (D)		Fred J. Grace	T. H. Harris (D)	39D, 2I	118D	Joseph E. Ransdell (D)	John Thornton (D)	8D	Wilson/ Marshall (D) ✓
1914	Luther E. Hall (D)	Thomas C. Barret (D)	Alvin Hebert (D)	Ruffin G. Pleasant (D)	LeDoux E. Smith (D)		Fred J. Grace	T. H. Harris (D)	39D, 2I	118D	Joseph E. Ransdell (D)	John Thornton (D)	8D	Wilson/ Marshall (D) ✓
1915	Luther E. Hall (D)	Thomas C. Barret (D)	W. F. Millsaps (D)	Ruffin G. Pleasant (D)	LeDoux E. Smith (D)		Fred J. Grace	T. H. Harris (D)	39D, 2I	118D	Joseph E. Ransdell (D)	Robert F. Broussard (D)	7D, 1Prog	Wilson/ Marshall (D) ✓
1916	Ruffin G. Pleasant (D)	Fernand Mouton (D)	James J. Bailey (D)	Adolphe V. Coco (D)	Henry Hunsicker (D)	Harry Wilson (D)	Fred J. Grace	T. H. Harris (D)	36D, 5Prog	106D, 12Prog	Joseph E. Ransdell (D)	Robert F. Broussard (D)	7D, 1Prog	Wilson/ Marshall (D) ✓
1917	Ruffin G. Pleasant (D)	Fernand Mouton (D)	James J. Bailey (D)	Adolphe V. Coco (D)	Henry Hunsicker (D)	Harry Wilson (D)	Fred J. Grace	T. H. Harris (D)	36D, 5Prog	106D, 12Prog	Joseph E. Ransdell (D)	Walter Guion (D)	7D, 1Prog	Wilson/ Marshall (D) ✓
1918	Ruffin G. Pleasant (D)	Fernand Mouton (D)	James J. Bailey (D)	Adolphe V. Coco (D)	Henry Hunsicker (D)	Harry Wilson (D)	Fred J. Grace	T. H. Harris (D)	36D, 5Prog	106D, 12Prog	Joseph E. Ransdell (D)	Walter Guion (D)	7D, 1Prog	Wilson/ Marshall (D) ✓
1919	Ruffin G. Pleasant (D)	Fernand Mouton (D)	James J. Bailey (D)	Adolphe V. Coco (D)	Henry Hunsicker (D)	Harry Wilson (D)	Fred J. Grace	T. H. Harris (D)	36D, 5Prog	106D, 12Prog	Joseph E. Ransdell (D)	Edward J. Gay (D)	8D	Wilson/ Marshall (D) ✓
1920	John M. Parker (D)	Hewitt Bouanchaud (D)	James J. Bailey (D)	Adolphe V. Coco (D)	Howell Morgan (D)	Harry Wilson (D)	Fred J. Grace	T. H. Harris (D)	41D	118D	Joseph E. Ransdell (D)	Edward J. Gay (D)	8D	Cox/ Roosevelt (D) ✗
1921	John M. Parker (D)	Hewitt Bouanchaud (D)	James J. Bailey (D)	Adolphe V. Coco (D)	Howell Morgan (D)	Harry Wilson (D)	Fred J. Grace	T. H. Harris (D)	41D	118D	Joseph E. Ransdell (D)	Edwin S. Broussard (D)	8D	Cox/ Roosevelt (D) ✗
1922	John M. Parker (D)	Hewitt Bouanchaud (D)	James J. Bailey (D)	Adolphe V. Coco (D)	Howell Morgan (D)	Harry Wilson (D)	Fred J. Grace	T. H. Harris (D)	41D	118D	Joseph E. Ransdell (D)	Edwin S. Broussard (D)	8D	Cox/ Roosevelt (D) ✗
1923	John M. Parker (D)	Hewitt Bouanchaud (D)	James J. Bailey (D)	Adolphe V. Coco (D)	Howell Morgan (D)	Harry Wilson (D)	Fred J. Grace	T. H. Harris (D)	41D	118D	Joseph E. Ransdell (D)	Edwin S. Broussard (D)	8D	Cox/ Roosevelt (D) ✗
1924	Henry L. Fuqua (D)	Delos R. Johnson (D)	James J. Bailey (D)	Percy Saint (D)	L. B. Baynard Jr. (D)	Harry Wilson (D)	Fred J. Grace	T. H. Harris (D)	39D	101D	Joseph E. Ransdell (D)	Edwin S. Broussard (D)	8D	Davis/ Bryan (D) ✗
1924	Henry L. Fuqua (D)	Oramel H. Simpson (D)	James J. Bailey (D)	Percy Saint (D)	L. B. Baynard Jr. (D)	Harry Wilson (D)	Fred J. Grace	T. H. Harris (D)	39D	101D	Joseph E. Ransdell (D)	Edwin S. Broussard (D)	8D	Davis/ Bryan (D) ✗
1925	Henry L. Fuqua (D)	Oramel H. Simpson (D)	James J. Bailey (D)	Percy Saint (D)	L. B. Baynard Jr. (D)	Harry Wilson (D)	Fred J. Grace	T. H. Harris (D)	39D	101D	Joseph E. Ransdell (D)	Edwin S. Broussard (D)	8D	Davis/ Bryan (D) ✗
1926	Henry L. Fuqua (D)	Philip H. Gilbert (D)	James J. Bailey (D)	Percy Saint (D)	L. B. Baynard Jr. (D)	Harry Wilson (D)	Fred J. Grace	T. H. Harris (D)	39D	101D	Joseph E. Ransdell (D)	Edwin S. Broussard (D)	8D	Davis/ Bryan (D) ✗
1926	Oramel H. Simpson (D)	Philip H. Gilbert (D)	James J. Bailey (D)	Percy Saint (D)	L. B. Baynard Jr. (D)	Harry Wilson (D)	Fred J. Grace	T. H. Harris (D)	39D	101D	Joseph E. Ransdell (D)	Edwin S. Broussard (D)	8D	Davis/ Bryan (D) ✗
1927	Oramel H. Simpson (D)	Philip H. Gilbert (D)	James J. Bailey (D)	Percy Saint (D)	L. B. Baynard Jr. (D)	Harry Wilson (D)	Fred J. Grace	T. H. Harris (D)	39D	101D	Joseph E. Ransdell (D)	Edwin S. Broussard (D)	8D	Davis/ Bryan (D) ✗
1928	Huey Long (D) (Note: Impeached on charges of bribery and corruption, but not convicted.) (Note: Resigned to take an elected seat in the United States Senate; was elected to the Senate in 1930, but did not take office until 1932, preferring to remain in office as governor.)	Paul N. Cyr (D)	James J. Bailey (D)	Percy Saint (D)	Haney B. Connor (D)	Harry Wilson (D)	Fred J. Grace	T. H. Harris (D)	39D	101D	Joseph E. Ransdell (D)	Edwin S. Broussard (D)	8D	Smith/ Robinson (D) ✗
1929	Huey Long (D)	Paul N. Cyr (D)	James J. Bailey (D)	Percy Saint (D)	Haney B. Connor (D)	Harry Wilson (D)	Fred J. Grace	T. H. Harris (D)	39D	101D	Joseph E. Ransdell (D)	Edwin S. Broussard (D)	8D	Smith/ Robinson (D) ✗
1930	Huey Long (D)	Paul N. Cyr (D)	Alice Lee Grosjean (D)	Percy Saint (D)	Haney B. Connor (D)	Harry Wilson (D)	Fred J. Grace	T. H. Harris (D)	39D	101D	Joseph E. Ransdell (D)	Edwin S. Broussard (D)	8D	Smith/ Robinson (D) ✗
1931	Huey Long (D)	Paul N. Cyr (D)	Alice Lee Grosjean (D)	Percy Saint (D)	Haney B. Connor (D)	Harry Wilson (D)	Lucille May; Grace (D)	T. H. Harris (D)	39D	101D	vacant (Note: Governor Huey Long was elected to the U.S. Senate in 1930 but delayed taking office until 1932 so his Lieutenant Governor, Paul N. Cyr, would not take over as Governor.)	Edwin S. Broussard (D)	8D	Smith/ Robinson (D) ✗
1932	Alvin Olin King (D) (Note: Paul N. Cyr was lieutenant governor under Long and stated that he would succeed Long when Long left for the Senate, but Long demanded Cyr forfeit his office. King, as president of the state Senate, was elevated to lieutenant governor and later governor.)	John B. Fournet (D)	E. A. Conway (D)	Gaston L. Porterlie (D)	Jess S. Cave (D)	Harry Wilson (D)	Lucille May; Grace (D)	T. H. Harris (D)	39D	101D	Huey Long (D)	Edwin S. Broussard (D)	8D	Roosevelt/ Garner (D) ✓
1932	Oscar K. Allen (D)	John B. Fournet (D)	E. A. Conway (D)	Gaston L. Porterlie (D)	Jess S. Cave (D)	Harry Wilson (D)	Lucille May; Grace (D)	T. H. Harris (D)	39D	101D	Huey Long (D)	Edwin S. Broussard (D)	8D	Roosevelt/ Garner (D) ✓
1933	Oscar K. Allen (D)	John B. Fournet (D)	E. A. Conway (D)	Gaston L. Porterlie (D)	Jess S. Cave (D)	Harry Wilson (D)	Lucille May; Grace (D)	T. H. Harris (D)	39D	101D	Huey Long (D)	John H. Overton (D)	8D	Roosevelt/ Garner (D) ✓
1934	Oscar K. Allen (D)	John B. Fournet (D)	E. A. Conway (D)	Gaston L. Porterlie (D)	Jess S. Cave (D)	Harry Wilson (D)	Lucille May; Grace (D)	T. H. Harris (D)	39D	101D	Huey Long (D)	John H. Overton (D)	8D	Roosevelt/ Garner (D) ✓
1935	Oscar K. Allen (D)	James A. Noe (D)	E. A. Conway (D)	Gaston L. Porterlie (D)	Jess S. Cave (D)	Harry Wilson (D)	Lucille May; Grace (D)	T. H. Harris (D)	39D	101D	Huey Long (D)	John H. Overton (D)	8D	Roosevelt/ Garner (D) ✓
1936	James A. Noe (D)	Earl Long (D)	E. A. Conway (D)	Gaston L. Porterlie (D)	A. P. Tugwell (D)	Harry Wilson (D)	Lucille May; Grace (D)	T. H. Harris (D)	39D	101D	Rose McConnell Long (D)	John H. Overton (D)	8D	Roosevelt/ Garner (D) ✓
1936	Richard W. Leche (D) (Note: Resigned due to a fraud scandal; was later convicted of mail fraud and served five years in prison. He was pardoned by President Harry S. Truman in 1953.)	Earl Long (D)	E. A. Conway (D)	Gaston L. Porterlie (D)	A. P. Tugwell (D)	Harry Wilson (D)	Lucille May; Grace (D)	T. H. Harris (D)	39D	101D	Rose McConnell Long (D)	John H. Overton (D)	8D	Roosevelt/ Garner (D) ✓
1937	Richard W. Leche (D)	Earl Long (D)	E. A. Conway (D)	Gaston L. Porterlie (D)	A. P. Tugwell (D)	Harry Wilson (D)	Lucille May; Grace (D)	T. H. Harris (D)	39D	101D	Allen J. Ellender (D)	John H. Overton (D)	8D	Roosevelt/ Garner (D) ✓
1938	Richard W. Leche (D)	Earl Long (D)	E. A. Conway (D)	Gaston L. Porterlie (D)	A. P. Tugwell (D)	Harry Wilson (D)	Lucille May; Grace (D)	T. H. Harris (D)	39D	101D	Allen J. Ellender (D)	John H. Overton (D)	8D	Roosevelt/ Garner (D) ✓
1939	Richard W. Leche (D)	Coleman Lindsey (D)	E. A. Conway (D)	James Ellison (D)	A. P. Tugwell (D)	Harry Wilson (D)	Lucille May; Grace (D)	T. H. Harris (D)	39D	101D	Allen J. Ellender (D)	John H. Overton (D)	8D	Roosevelt/ Garner (D) ✓
1939	Earl Long (D)	Coleman Lindsey (D)	E. A. Conway (D)	Lessley Gardiner (D)	A. P. Tugwell (D)	Harry Wilson (D)	Lucille May; Grace (D)	T. H. Harris (D)	39D	101D	Allen J. Ellender (D)	John H. Overton (D)	8D	Roosevelt/ Garner (D) ✓
1940	Sam H. Jones (D)	Marc M. Mouton (D)	Jack Gremillion (D)	Eugene Stanley (D)	A. P. Tugwell (D)	Harry Wilson (D)	Lucille May; Grace (D)	John E. Coxe (D)	39D	101D	Allen J. Ellender (D)	John H. Overton (D)	8D	Roosevelt/ Wallace (D) ✓
1941	Sam H. Jones (D)	Marc M. Mouton (D)	Jack Gremillion (D)	Eugene Stanley (D)	A. P. Tugwell (D)	Harry Wilson (D)	Lucille May; Grace (D)	John E. Coxe (D)	39D	101D	Allen J. Ellender (D)	John H. Overton (D)	8D	Roosevelt/ Wallace (D) ✓
1942	Sam H. Jones (D)	Marc M. Mouton (D)	Jack Gremillion (D)	Eugene Stanley (D)	A. P. Tugwell (D)	Harry Wilson (D)	Lucille May; Grace (D)	John E. Coxe (D)	39D	101D	Allen J. Ellender (D)	John H. Overton (D)	8D	Roosevelt/ Wallace (D) ✓
1943	Sam H. Jones (D)	Marc M. Mouton (D)	Jack Gremillion (D)	Eugene Stanley (D)	A. P. Tugwell (D)	Harry Wilson (D)	Lucille May; Grace (D)	John E. Coxe (D)	39D	101D	Allen J. Ellender (D)	John H. Overton (D)	8D	Roosevelt/ Wallace (D) ✓
1944	Jimmie Davis (D)	J. Emile Verret (D)	Wade O. Martin Jr. (D)	Fred S. LeBlanc (D)	A. P. Tugwell (D)	Harry Wilson (D)	Lucille May; Grace (D)	John E. Coxe (D)	39D	101D	Allen J. Ellender (D)	John H. Overton (D)	8D	Roosevelt/ Truman (D) ✓
1945	Jimmie Davis (D)	J. Emile Verret (D)	Wade O. Martin Jr. (D)	Fred S. LeBlanc (D)	A. P. Tugwell (D)	Harry Wilson (D)	Lucille May; Grace (D)	John E. Coxe (D)	39D	101D	Allen J. Ellender (D)	John H. Overton (D)	8D	Roosevelt/ Truman (D) ✓
1946	Jimmie Davis (D)	J. Emile Verret (D)	Wade O. Martin Jr. (D)	Fred S. LeBlanc (D)	A. P. Tugwell (D)	Harry Wilson (D)	Lucille May; Grace (D)	John E. Coxe (D)	39D	101D	Allen J. Ellender (D)	John H. Overton (D)	8D	Roosevelt/ Truman (D) ✓
1947	Jimmie Davis (D)	J. Emile Verret (D)	Wade O. Martin Jr. (D)	Fred S. LeBlanc (D)	A. P. Tugwell (D)	Harry Wilson (D)	Lucille May; Grace (D)	John E. Coxe (D)	39D	101D	Allen J. Ellender (D)	John H. Overton (D)	8D	Roosevelt/ Truman (D) ✓
1948	Earl Long (D)	Bill Dodd (D)	Wade O. Martin Jr. (D)	Bolivar E. Kemp (D)	A. P. Tugwell (D)	Millard Perkins (D)	Lucille May; Grace (D)	Shelby M. Jackson (D)	39D	101D	Allen J. Ellender (D)	William C. Feazel (D)	8D	Thurmond/ Wright (Dix) ✗
1949	Earl Long (D)	Bill Dodd (D)	Wade O. Martin Jr. (D)	Bolivar E. Kemp (D)	A. P. Tugwell (D)	W. E. Anderson (D)	Lucille May; Grace (D)	Shelby M. Jackson (D)	39D	101D	Allen J. Ellender (D)	Russell B. Long (D)	8D	Thurmond/ Wright (Dix) ✗
1950	Earl Long (D)	Bill Dodd (D)	Wade O. Martin Jr. (D)	Bolivar E. Kemp (D)	A. P. Tugwell (D)	W. E. Anderson (D)	Lucille May; Grace (D)	Shelby M. Jackson (D)	39D	101D	Allen J. Ellender (D)	Russell B. Long (D)	8D	Thurmond/ Wright (Dix) ✗
1951	Earl Long (D)	Bill Dodd (D)	Wade O. Martin Jr. (D)	Bolivar E. Kemp (D)	A. P. Tugwell (D)	W. E. Anderson (D)	Lucille May; Grace (D)	Shelby M. Jackson (D)	39D	101D	Allen J. Ellender (D)	Russell B. Long (D)	8D	Thurmond/ Wright (Dix) ✗

=== 1952–2003 ===
Year	Executive offices											State Legislature		United States Congress			Electoral votes
Year	Governor	Lt. Governor	Sec. of State	Attorney General	Treasurer	Auditor/ Comptroller	Ag. & Forest Comm.	Ins. Comm.	Comm. of Elections	Registrar of Lands	Supt. of Ed.	State Senate	State House	U.S. Senator (Class II)	U.S. Senator (Class III)	U.S. House	Electoral votes
1952	Robert F. Kennon (D)	C. E. Barham (D)	Wade O. Martin Jr. (D)	Fred S. LeBlanc (D)	A. P. Tugwell (D)	Allison Kolb (D)	Dave L. Pearce (D)	no such office	no such office	Ellen Bryan; Moore (D)	Shelby M. Jackson (D)	39D	101D	Allen J. Ellender (D)	Russell B. Long (D)	8D	Stevenson/ Sparkman (D) ✗
1953	Robert F. Kennon (D)	C. E. Barham (D)	Wade O. Martin Jr. (D)	Fred S. LeBlanc (D)	A. P. Tugwell (D)	Allison Kolb (D)	Dave L. Pearce (D)	no such office	no such office	Ellen Bryan; Moore (D)	Shelby M. Jackson (D)	39D	101D	Allen J. Ellender (D)	Russell B. Long (D)	8D	Stevenson/ Sparkman (D) ✗
1954	Robert F. Kennon (D)	C. E. Barham (D)	Wade O. Martin Jr. (D)	Fred S. LeBlanc (D)	A. P. Tugwell (D)	Allison Kolb (D)	Dave L. Pearce (D)	no such office	no such office	Ellen Bryan; Moore (D)	Shelby M. Jackson (D)	39D	101D	Allen J. Ellender (D)	Russell B. Long (D)	8D	Stevenson/ Sparkman (D) ✗
1955	Robert F. Kennon (D)	C. E. Barham (D)	Wade O. Martin Jr. (D)	Fred S. LeBlanc (D)	A. P. Tugwell (D)	Allison Kolb (D)	Dave L. Pearce (D)	no such office	no such office	Ellen Bryan; Moore (D)	Shelby M. Jackson (D)	39D	101D	Allen J. Ellender (D)	Russell B. Long (D)	8D	Stevenson/ Sparkman (D) ✗
1956	Earl Long (D)	Lether Edward Frazar (D)	Wade O. Martin Jr. (D)	Jack Gremillion (D)	A. P. Tugwell (D)	Bill Dodd (D)	Sidney McCrory (D)	no such office	appointed	Lucille May Grace (D)	Shelby M. Jackson (D)	39D	101D	Allen J. Ellender (D)	Russell B. Long (D)	8D	Eisenhower/ Nixon (R) ✓
1957	Earl Long (D)	Lether Edward Frazar (D)	Wade O. Martin Jr. (D)	Jack Gremillion (D)	A. P. Tugwell (D)	Bill Dodd (D)	Sidney McCrory (D)	Rufus D. Hayes (D)	appointed	vacant	Shelby M. Jackson (D)	39D	101D	Allen J. Ellender (D)	Russell B. Long (D)	8D	Eisenhower/ Nixon (R) ✓
1958	Earl Long (D)	Lether Edward Frazar (D)	Wade O. Martin Jr. (D)	Jack Gremillion (D)	A. P. Tugwell (D)	Bill Dodd (D)	Sidney McCrory (D)	Rufus D. Hayes (D)	appointed	vacant	Shelby M. Jackson (D)	39D	101D	Allen J. Ellender (D)	Russell B. Long (D)	8D	Eisenhower/ Nixon (R) ✓
1959	Earl Long (D)	Lether Edward Frazar (D)	Wade O. Martin Jr. (D)	Jack Gremillion (D)	A. P. Tugwell (D)	Bill Dodd (D)	Sidney McCrory (D)	Rufus D. Hayes (D)	appointed	vacant	Shelby M. Jackson (D)	39D	101D	Allen J. Ellender (D)	Russell B. Long (D)	8D	Eisenhower/ Nixon (R) ✓
1960	Jimmie Davis (D)	Taddy Aycock (D)	Wade O. Martin Jr. (D)	Jack Gremillion (D)	A. P. Tugwell (D)	Roy R. Theriot (D)	Dave L. Pearce (D)	Rufus D. Hayes (D)	Douglas Fowler (D)	Ellen Bryan; Moore (D)	Shelby M. Jackson (D)	39D	101D	Allen J. Ellender (D)	Russell B. Long (D)	8D	Kennedy/ Johnson (D) ✓
1961	Jimmie Davis (D)	Taddy Aycock (D)	Wade O. Martin Jr. (D)	Jack Gremillion (D)	A. P. Tugwell (D)	Roy R. Theriot (D)	Dave L. Pearce (D)	Rufus D. Hayes (D)	Douglas Fowler (D)	Ellen Bryan; Moore (D)	Shelby M. Jackson (D)	39D	101D	Allen J. Ellender (D)	Russell B. Long (D)	8D	Kennedy/ Johnson (D) ✓
1962	Jimmie Davis (D)	Taddy Aycock (D)	Wade O. Martin Jr. (D)	Jack Gremillion (D)	A. P. Tugwell (D)	Roy R. Theriot (D)	Dave L. Pearce (D)	Rufus D. Hayes (D)	Douglas Fowler (D)	Ellen Bryan; Moore (D)	Shelby M. Jackson (D)	39D	101D	Allen J. Ellender (D)	Russell B. Long (D)	8D	Kennedy/ Johnson (D) ✓
1963	Jimmie Davis (D)	Taddy Aycock (D)	Wade O. Martin Jr. (D)	Jack Gremillion (D)	A. P. Tugwell (D)	Roy R. Theriot (D)	Dave L. Pearce (D)	Rufus D. Hayes (D)	Douglas Fowler (D)	Ellen Bryan; Moore (D)	Shelby M. Jackson (D)	39D	101D	Allen J. Ellender (D)	Russell B. Long (D)	8D	Kennedy/ Johnson (D) ✓
1964	John McKeithen (D) (Note: First governor elected to consecutive terms after the 1921 constitution was amended in 1966 to allow governors to serve two consecutive terms.)	Taddy Aycock (D)	Wade O. Martin Jr. (D)	Jack Gremillion (D)	A. P. Tugwell (D)	Roy R. Theriot (D)	Dave L. Pearce (D)	Dudley A. Guglielmo (D)	Douglas Fowler (D)	Ellen Bryan; Moore (D)	Bill Dodd (D)	39D	103D, 2R (Note: Morley Hudson and Taylor O'Hearn were the first Republicans elected to the Legislature in the 20th century.)	Allen J. Ellender (D)	Russell B. Long (D)	8D	Goldwater/ Miller (R) ✗
1965	John McKeithen (D)	Taddy Aycock (D)	Wade O. Martin Jr. (D)	Jack Gremillion (D)	A. P. Tugwell (D)	Roy R. Theriot (D)	Dave L. Pearce (D)	Dudley A. Guglielmo (D)	Douglas Fowler (D)	Ellen Bryan; Moore (D)	Bill Dodd (D)	39D	103D, 2R	Allen J. Ellender (D)	Russell B. Long (D)	8D	Goldwater/ Miller (R) ✗
1966	John McKeithen (D)	Taddy Aycock (D)	Wade O. Martin Jr. (D)	Jack Gremillion (D)	A. P. Tugwell (D)	Roy R. Theriot (D)	Dave L. Pearce (D)	Dudley A. Guglielmo (D)	Douglas Fowler (D)	Ellen Bryan; Moore (D)	Bill Dodd (D)	39D	102D, 3R (Note: Roderick Miller was elected in a special election.)	Allen J. Ellender (D)	Russell B. Long (D)	8D	Goldwater/ Miller (R) ✗
1967	John McKeithen (D)	Taddy Aycock (D)	Wade O. Martin Jr. (D)	Jack Gremillion (D)	A. P. Tugwell (D)	Roy R. Theriot (D)	Dave L. Pearce (D)	Dudley A. Guglielmo (D)	Douglas Fowler (D)	Ellen Bryan; Moore (D)	Bill Dodd (D)	39D	101D, 4R (Note: Edward Clark Gaudin was elected in a special election.)	Allen J. Ellender (D)	Russell B. Long (D)	8D	Goldwater/ Miller (R) ✗
1968	John McKeithen (D)	Taddy Aycock (D)	Wade O. Martin Jr. (D)	Jack Gremillion (D)	Mary Evelyn Parker (D)	Roy R. Theriot (D)	Dave L. Pearce (D)	Dudley A. Guglielmo (D)	Douglas Fowler (D)	Ellen Bryan; Moore (D)	Bill Dodd (D)	39D	105D	Allen J. Ellender (D)	Russell B. Long (D)	8D	Wallace/ LeMay (AI) ✗
1969	John McKeithen (D)	Taddy Aycock (D)	Wade O. Martin Jr. (D)	Jack Gremillion (D)	Mary Evelyn Parker (D)	Roy R. Theriot (D)	Dave L. Pearce (D)	Dudley A. Guglielmo (D)	Douglas Fowler (D)	Ellen Bryan; Moore (D)	Bill Dodd (D)	39D	105D	Allen J. Ellender (D)	Russell B. Long (D)	8D	Wallace/ LeMay (AI) ✗
1970	John McKeithen (D)	Taddy Aycock (D)	Wade O. Martin Jr. (D)	Jack Gremillion (D)	Mary Evelyn Parker (D)	Roy R. Theriot (D)	Dave L. Pearce (D)	Dudley A. Guglielmo (D)	Douglas Fowler (D)	Ellen Bryan; Moore (D)	Bill Dodd (D)	38D, 1R (Note: A.C. Clemons switched parties from Democratic to Republican, becoming the first Republican in the State Senate in the 20th century.)	104D, 1R (Note: James Sutterfield was elected in a special election from Orleans Parish, becoming the first Republican to do so in the 20th century.)	Allen J. Ellender (D)	Russell B. Long (D)	8D	Wallace/ LeMay (AI) ✗
1971	John McKeithen (D)	Taddy Aycock (D)	Wade O. Martin Jr. (D)	Jack Gremillion (D)	Mary Evelyn Parker (D)	Roy R. Theriot (D)	Dave L. Pearce (D)	Dudley A. Guglielmo (D)	Douglas Fowler (D)	Ellen Bryan; Moore (D)	Bill Dodd (D)	38D, 1R	104D, 1R	Allen J. Ellender (D)	Russell B. Long (D)	8D	Wallace/ LeMay (AI) ✗
1972	Edwin Edwards (D)	Jimmy Fitzmorris (D)	Wade O. Martin Jr. (D)	William J. Guste (D)	Mary Evelyn Parker (D)	Roy R. Theriot (D)	Dave L. Pearce (D)	Sherman A. Bernard (D)	Douglas Fowler (D)	Ellen Bryan; Moore (D)	Louis J. Michot (D)	39D	101D, 4R	Elaine Edwards (D)	Russell B. Long (D)	8D	Nixon/ Agnew (R) ✓
1973	Edwin Edwards (D)	Jimmy Fitzmorris (D)	Wade O. Martin Jr. (D)	William J. Guste (D)	Mary Evelyn Parker (D)	Roy R. Theriot (D)	Dave L. Pearce (D)	Sherman A. Bernard (D)	Douglas Fowler (D)	Ellen Bryan; Moore (D)	Louis J. Michot (D)	39D	101D, 4R	J. Bennett Johnston (D)	Russell B. Long (D)	7D, 1R	Nixon/ Agnew (R) ✓
1974	Edwin Edwards (D)	Jimmy Fitzmorris (D)	Wade O. Martin Jr. (D)	William J. Guste (D)	Mary Evelyn Parker (D)	appointed	Dave L. Pearce (D)	Sherman A. Bernard (D)	Douglas Fowler (D)	Ellen Bryan; Moore (D)	Louis J. Michot (D)	39D	101D, 4R	J. Bennett Johnston (D)	Russell B. Long (D)	7D, 1R	Nixon/ Agnew (R) ✓
1975	Edwin Edwards (D)	Jimmy Fitzmorris (D)	Wade O. Martin Jr. (D)	William J. Guste (D)	Mary Evelyn Parker (D)	appointed	Dave L. Pearce (D)	Sherman A. Bernard (D)	Douglas Fowler (D)	Ellen Bryan; Moore (D)	Louis J. Michot (D)	39D	101D, 4R	J. Bennett Johnston (D)	Russell B. Long (D)	6D, 2R	Nixon/ Agnew (R) ✓
1976	Edwin Edwards (D)	Jimmy Fitzmorris (D)	Paul Hardy (D)	William J. Guste (D)	Mary Evelyn Parker (D)	appointed	Gil Dozier (D)	Sherman A. Bernard (D)	Douglas Fowler (D)	appointed	J. Kelly Nix (D)	38D, 1R (Note: Edwards Barham became the first Republican elected to the State Senate in the 20th century.)	101D, 4R	J. Bennett Johnston (D)	Russell B. Long (D)	6D, 2R	Carter/ Mondale (D) ✓
1977	Edwin Edwards (D)	Jimmy Fitzmorris (D)	Paul Hardy (D)	William J. Guste (D)	Mary Evelyn Parker (D)	appointed	Gil Dozier (D)	Sherman A. Bernard (D)	Douglas Fowler (D)	appointed	J. Kelly Nix (D)	38D, 1R	99D, 6R (Note: A.J. McNamara and Lane A. Carson switched parties from Democratic to Republican.)	J. Bennett Johnston (D)	Russell B. Long (D)	6D, 2R	Carter/ Mondale (D) ✓
1978	Edwin Edwards (D)	Jimmy Fitzmorris (D)	Paul Hardy (D)	William J. Guste (D)	Mary Evelyn Parker (D)	appointed	Gil Dozier (D)	Sherman A. Bernard (D)	Douglas Fowler (D)	appointed	J. Kelly Nix (D)	38D, 1R	98D, 7R (Note: Michael F. Thompson switched parties from Democratic to Republican.)	J. Bennett Johnston (D)	Russell B. Long (D)	6D, 2R	Carter/ Mondale (D) ✓
1979	Edwin Edwards (D)	Jimmy Fitzmorris (D)	Paul Hardy (D)	William J. Guste (D)	Mary Evelyn Parker (D)	appointed	Gil Dozier (D)	Sherman A. Bernard (D)	Douglas Fowler (D)	appointed	J. Kelly Nix (D)	38D, 1R	98D, 7R	J. Bennett Johnston (D)	Russell B. Long (D)	5D, 3R	Carter/ Mondale (D) ✓
1980	Dave Treen (R)	Robert Louis; Freeman Sr. (D)	Jim Brown (D)	William J. Guste (D)	Mary Evelyn Parker (D)	appointed	Bob Odom (D)	Sherman A. Bernard (D)	Jerry Fowler (D)	appointed	J. Kelly Nix (D)	39D	95D, 10R (Note: Ed Scogin switched parties from Democratic to Republican just before the start of the new session.)	J. Bennett Johnston (D)	Russell B. Long (D)	5D, 3R	Reagan/ Bush (R) ✓
1981	Dave Treen (R)	Robert Louis; Freeman Sr. (D)	Jim Brown (D)	William J. Guste (D)	Mary Evelyn Parker (D)	appointed	Bob Odom (D)	Sherman A. Bernard (D)	Jerry Fowler (D)	appointed	J. Kelly Nix (D)	39D	95D, 10R	J. Bennett Johnston (D)	Russell B. Long (D)	6D, 2R	Reagan/ Bush (R) ✓
1982	Dave Treen (R)	Robert Louis; Freeman Sr. (D)	Jim Brown (D)	William J. Guste (D)	Mary Evelyn Parker (D)	appointed	Bob Odom (D)	Sherman A. Bernard (D)	Jerry Fowler (D)	appointed	J. Kelly Nix (D)	39D	95D, 10R	J. Bennett Johnston (D)	Russell B. Long (D)	6D, 2R	Reagan/ Bush (R) ✓
1983	Dave Treen (R)	Robert Louis; Freeman Sr. (D)	Jim Brown (D)	William J. Guste (D)	Mary Evelyn Parker (D)	appointed	Bob Odom (D)	Sherman A. Bernard (D)	Jerry Fowler (D)	appointed	J. Kelly Nix (D)	39D	95D, 10R	J. Bennett Johnston (D)	Russell B. Long (D)	6D, 2R	Reagan/ Bush (R) ✓
1984	Edwin Edwards (D)	Robert Louis; Freeman Sr. (D)	Jim Brown (D)	William J. Guste (D)	Mary Evelyn Parker (D)	appointed	Bob Odom (D)	Sherman A. Bernard (D)	Jerry Fowler (D)	appointed	Thomas Clausen (D)	37D, 2R (Note: Ken Hollis was elected as a Republican, and Ken Osterberger switched parties after the election from Democratic to Republican.)	93D, 11R, 1I	J. Bennett Johnston (D)	Russell B. Long (D)	6D, 2R	Reagan/ Bush (R) ✓
1985	Edwin Edwards (D)	Robert Louis; Freeman Sr. (D)	Jim Brown (D)	William J. Guste (D)	Mary Evelyn Parker (D)	appointed	Bob Odom (D)	Sherman A. Bernard (D)	Jerry Fowler (D)	appointed	Thomas Clausen (D)	37D, 2R	93D, 11R, 1I	J. Bennett Johnston (D)	Russell B. Long (D)	6D, 2R	Reagan/ Bush (R) ✓
1986	Edwin Edwards (D)	Robert Louis; Freeman Sr. (D)	Jim Brown (D)	William J. Guste (D)	Mary Evelyn Parker (D)	appointed	Bob Odom (D)	Sherman A. Bernard (D)	Jerry Fowler (D)	appointed	Thomas Clausen (D)	37D, 2R	93D, 11R, 1I	J. Bennett Johnston (D)	Russell B. Long (D)	6D, 2R	Reagan/ Bush (R) ✓
1987	Edwin Edwards (D)	Robert Louis; Freeman Sr. (D)	Jim Brown (D)	William J. Guste (D)	Mary Evelyn Parker (D)	appointed	Bob Odom (D)	Sherman A. Bernard (D)	Jerry Fowler (D)	appointed	Thomas Clausen (D)	37D, 2R	93D, 11R, 1I	J. Bennett Johnston (D)	John Breaux (D)	5D, 3R	Reagan/ Bush (R) ✓
1988	Buddy Roemer (D)	Paul Hardy (R)	W. Fox McKeithen (D)	William J. Guste (D)	Mary Landrieu (D)	appointed	Bob Odom (D)	Douglas D. Green (D)	Jerry Fowler (D)	appointed	appointed	34D, 5R	88D, 16R, 1I	J. Bennett Johnston (D)	John Breaux (D)	5D, 3R	Bush/ Quayle (R) ✓
1989	Buddy Roemer (D)	Paul Hardy (R)	W. Fox McKeithen (D)	William J. Guste (D)	Mary Landrieu (D)	appointed	Bob Odom (D)	Douglas D. Green (D)	Jerry Fowler (D)	appointed	appointed	34D, 5R	88D, 16R, 1I	J. Bennett Johnston (D)	John Breaux (D)	4D, 4R	Bush/ Quayle (R) ✓
1989	Buddy Roemer (D)	Paul Hardy (R)	W. Fox McKeithen (R) (Note: Switched parties in 1989.)	William J. Guste (D)	Mary Landrieu (D)	appointed	Bob Odom (D)	Douglas D. Green (D)	Jerry Fowler (D)	appointed	appointed	34D, 5R	88D, 16R, 1I	J. Bennett Johnston (D)	John Breaux (D)	4D, 4R	Bush/ Quayle (R) ✓
1990	Buddy Roemer (D)	Paul Hardy (R)	W. Fox McKeithen (R)	William J. Guste (D)	Mary Landrieu (D)	appointed	Bob Odom (D)	Douglas D. Green (D)	Jerry Fowler (D)	appointed	appointed	34D, 5R	88D, 16R, 1I	J. Bennett Johnston (D)	John Breaux (D)	4D, 4R	Bush/ Quayle (R) ✓
1991	Buddy Roemer (R) (Note: Elected as a Democrat in 1987 but switched parties to Republican in 1991.)	Paul Hardy (R)	W. Fox McKeithen (R)	William J. Guste (D)	Mary Landrieu (D)	appointed	Bob Odom (D)	Douglas D. Green (D)	Jerry Fowler (D)	appointed	appointed	34D, 5R	88D, 16R, 1I	J. Bennett Johnston (D)	John Breaux (D)	4D, 4R	Bush/ Quayle (R) ✓
1992	Edwin Edwards (D)	Melinda Schwegmann (D)	W. Fox McKeithen (R)	Richard Ieyoub (D)	Mary Landrieu (D)	appointed	Bob Odom (D)	Jim Brown (D)	Jerry Fowler (D)	appointed	appointed	33D, 6R	87D, 17R, 1I	J. Bennett Johnston (D)	John Breaux (D)	4D, 4R	Clinton/ Gore (D) ✓
1993	Edwin Edwards (D)	Melinda Schwegmann (D)	W. Fox McKeithen (R)	Richard Ieyoub (D)	Mary Landrieu (D)	appointed	Bob Odom (D)	Jim Brown (D)	Jerry Fowler (D)	appointed	appointed	33D, 6R	87D, 17R, 1I	J. Bennett Johnston (D)	John Breaux (D)	4D, 3R	Clinton/ Gore (D) ✓
1994	Edwin Edwards (D)	Melinda Schwegmann (D)	W. Fox McKeithen (R)	Richard Ieyoub (D)	Mary Landrieu (D)	appointed	Bob Odom (D)	Jim Brown (D)	Jerry Fowler (D)	appointed	appointed	33D, 6R	87D, 17R, 1I	J. Bennett Johnston (D)	John Breaux (D)	4D, 3R	Clinton/ Gore (D) ✓
1995	Edwin Edwards (D)	Melinda Schwegmann (D)	W. Fox McKeithen (R)	Richard Ieyoub (D)	Mary Landrieu (D)	appointed	Bob Odom (D)	Jim Brown (D)	Jerry Fowler (D)	appointed	appointed	33D, 6R	87D, 17R, 1I	J. Bennett Johnston (D)	John Breaux (D)	5R, 2D	Clinton/ Gore (D) ✓
1996	Mike Foster (R)	Kathleen Blanco (D)	W. Fox McKeithen (R)	Richard Ieyoub (D)	Ken Duncan (D)	appointed	Bob Odom (D)	Jim Brown (D)	Jerry Fowler (D)	appointed	appointed	26D, 13R	78D, 27R	J. Bennett Johnston (D)	John Breaux (D)	5R, 2D	Clinton/ Gore (D) ✓
1997	Mike Foster (R)	Kathleen Blanco (D)	W. Fox McKeithen (R)	Richard Ieyoub (D)	Ken Duncan (D)	appointed	Bob Odom (D)	Jim Brown (D)	Jerry Fowler (D)	appointed	appointed	26D, 13R	78D, 27R	Mary Landrieu (D)	John Breaux (D)	5R, 2D	Clinton/ Gore (D) ✓
1998	Mike Foster (R)	Kathleen Blanco (D)	W. Fox McKeithen (R)	Richard Ieyoub (D)	Ken Duncan (D)	appointed	Bob Odom (D)	Jim Brown (D)	Jerry Fowler (D)	appointed	appointed	26D, 13R	78D, 27R	Mary Landrieu (D)	John Breaux (D)	5R, 2D	Clinton/ Gore (D) ✓
1999	Mike Foster (R)	Kathleen Blanco (D)	W. Fox McKeithen (R)	Richard Ieyoub (D)	Ken Duncan (D)	appointed	Bob Odom (D)	Jim Brown (D)	Jerry Fowler (D)	appointed	appointed	26D, 13R	78D, 27R	Mary Landrieu (D)	John Breaux (D)	5R, 2D	Clinton/ Gore (D) ✓
2000	Mike Foster (R)	Kathleen Blanco (D)	W. Fox McKeithen (R)	Richard Ieyoub (D)	John Kennedy (D)	appointed	Bob Odom (D)	Jim Brown (D)	Suzanne Haik; Terrell (R)	appointed	appointed	26D, 13R	74D, 31R	Mary Landrieu (D)	John Breaux (D)	5R, 2D	Bush/ Cheney (R) ✓
2001	Mike Foster (R)	Kathleen Blanco (D)	W. Fox McKeithen (R)	Richard Ieyoub (D)	John Kennedy (D)	appointed	Bob Odom (D)	J. Robert Wooley (D)	Suzanne Haik; Terrell (R)	appointed	appointed	26D, 13R	74D, 31R	Mary Landrieu (D)	John Breaux (D)	5R, 2D	Bush/ Cheney (R) ✓
2002	Mike Foster (R)	Kathleen Blanco (D)	W. Fox McKeithen (R)	Richard Ieyoub (D)	John Kennedy (D)	appointed	Bob Odom (D)	J. Robert Wooley (D)	Suzanne Haik; Terrell (R)	appointed	appointed	26D, 13R	74D, 31R	Mary Landrieu (D)	John Breaux (D)	5R, 2D	Bush/ Cheney (R) ✓
2003	Mike Foster (R)	Kathleen Blanco (D)	W. Fox McKeithen (R)	Richard Ieyoub (D)	John Kennedy (D)	appointed	Bob Odom (D)	J. Robert Wooley (D)	Suzanne Haik; Terrell (R)	appointed	appointed	26D, 13R	74D, 31R	Mary Landrieu (D)	John Breaux (D)	4R, 3D	Bush/ Cheney (R) ✓

=== 2004–present ===
Year	Executive offices							State Legislature		United States Congress			Electoral votes
Year	Governor	Lt. Governor	Secretary of State	Attorney General	Treasurer	Ag. and For. Comm.	Ins. Comm.	State Senate	State House	U.S. Senator (Class II)	U.S. Senator (Class III)	U.S. House	Electoral votes
2004	Kathleen Blanco (D)	Mitch Landrieu (D) (Note: Resigned May 3, 2010 to become Mayor of New Orleans.)	W. Fox McKeithen (R)	Charles Foti (D)	John Kennedy (D)	Bob Odom (D)	J. Robert Wooley (D) (Note: Acting Commissioner from 2000 to 2003. Resigned February 15, 2006.)	24D, 15R	66D, 37R, 2I	Mary Landrieu (D)	John Breaux (D)	4R, 3D	Bush/ Cheney ✓
2005	Kathleen Blanco (D)	Mitch Landrieu (D)	W. Fox McKeithen (R)	Charles Foti (D)	John Kennedy (D)	Bob Odom (D)	J. Robert Wooley (D)	24D, 15R	66D, 37R, 2I	Mary Landrieu (D)	David Vitter (R)	5R, 2D	Bush/ Cheney ✓
2006	Kathleen Blanco (D)	Mitch Landrieu (D)	Al Ater (D) (Note: Acting Secretary of State through his entire tenure.)	Charles Foti (D)	John Kennedy (D)	Bob Odom (D)	Jim Donelon (R)	24D, 15R	66D, 37R, 2I	Mary Landrieu (D)	David Vitter (R)	5R, 2D	Bush/ Cheney ✓
2007	Kathleen Blanco (D)	Mitch Landrieu (D)	Jay Dardenne (R)	Charles Foti (D)	John Kennedy (D)	Bob Odom (D)	Jim Donelon (R)	24D, 15R	66D, 37R, 2I	Mary Landrieu (D)	David Vitter (R)	5R, 2D	Bush/ Cheney ✓
2008	Bobby Jindal (R)	Mitch Landrieu (D)	Jay Dardenne (R)	Buddy Caldwell (D)	John Kennedy (R) (Note: Kennedy switched parties from Democratic to Republican on August 27, 2007.)	Mike Strain (R)	Jim Donelon (R)	23D, 16R	53D, 50R, 2I	Mary Landrieu (D)	David Vitter (R)	4R, 3D (Note: Republican Rep. Bobby Jindal resigned in 2008 to become Governor of Louisiana and Richard Baker resigned in early 2008 to become a lobbyist. Republican Steve Scalise and Democrat Don Cazayoux won special elections in May to succeed them, respectively.)	McCain/ Palin (R) ✗
2009	Bobby Jindal (R)	Mitch Landrieu (D)	Jay Dardenne (R)	Buddy Caldwell (D)	John Kennedy (R)	Mike Strain (R)	Jim Donelon (R)	23D, 16R	53D, 50R, 2I (Note: Michael L. Jackson switched parties from Democratic to Independent after the 2008 legislative session before a run for the United States House of Representatives.)	Mary Landrieu (D)	David Vitter (R)	6R, 1D	McCain/ Palin (R) ✗
2010	Bobby Jindal (R)	Scott Angelle (D)	Jay Dardenne (R)	Buddy Caldwell (D)	John Kennedy (R)	Mike Strain (R)	Jim Donelon (R)	23D, 16R	53D, 50R, 2I	Mary Landrieu (D)	David Vitter (R)	6R, 1D	McCain/ Palin (R) ✗
2010	Bobby Jindal (R)	Scott Angelle (R) (Note: Appointed Lieutenant Governor on May 12, 2010 as a Democrat, Angelle switched parties and became a Republican on October 26. His term as Lieutenant Governor ended on November 22, 2010.)	Jay Dardenne (R)	Buddy Caldwell (D)	John Kennedy (R)	Mike Strain (R)	Jim Donelon (R)	23D, 16R	53D, 50R, 2I	Mary Landrieu (D)	David Vitter (R)	6R, 1D	McCain/ Palin (R) ✗
2011	Bobby Jindal (R)	Jay Dardenne (R)	Tom Schedler (R)	Buddy Caldwell (R) (Note: Switched parties from Democratic to Republican on February 11, 2011.)	John Kennedy (R)	Mike Strain (R)	Jim Donelon (R)	22R, 17D (Note: A combination of special elections and party switches flipped the chamber to Republican control prior to the legislative session.)	55R, 46D, 4I (Note: Six Democratic representatives switched parties in the lead-up to the 2011 legislative session, giving the Republicans the majority in the chamber. One Republican representative switched to Independent.)	Mary Landrieu (D)	David Vitter (R)	6R, 1D	McCain/ Palin (R) ✗
2012	Bobby Jindal (R)	Jay Dardenne (R)	Tom Schedler (R)	Buddy Caldwell (R)	John Kennedy (R)	Mike Strain (R)	Jim Donelon (R)	24R, 15D	58R, 45D, 2I	Mary Landrieu (D)	David Vitter (R)	6R, 1D	Romney/ Ryan (R) ✗
2013	Bobby Jindal (R)	Jay Dardenne (R)	Tom Schedler (R)	Buddy Caldwell (R)	John Kennedy (R)	Mike Strain (R)	Jim Donelon (R)	24R, 15D	58R, 45D, 2I	Mary Landrieu (D)	David Vitter (R)	5R, 1D	Romney/ Ryan (R) ✗
2014	Bobby Jindal (R)	Jay Dardenne (R)	Tom Schedler (R)	Buddy Caldwell (R)	John Kennedy (R)	Mike Strain (R)	Jim Donelon (R)	26R, 13D	59R, 44D, 2I	Mary Landrieu (D)	David Vitter (R)	5R, 1D	Romney/ Ryan (R) ✗
2015	Bobby Jindal (R)	Jay Dardenne (R)	Tom Schedler (R)	Buddy Caldwell (R)	John Kennedy (R)	Mike Strain (R)	Jim Donelon (R)	26R, 13D	59R, 44D, 2I	Bill Cassidy (R)	David Vitter (R)	5R, 1D	Romney/ Ryan (R) ✗
2016	John Bel; Edwards (D)	Billy Nungesser (R)	Tom Schedler (R)	Jeff Landry (R)	John Kennedy (R)	Mike Strain (R)	Jim Donelon (R)	25R, 14D	61R, 42D, 2I	Bill Cassidy (R)	David Vitter (R)	5R, 1D	Trump/ Pence (R) ✓
2017	John Bel; Edwards (D)	Billy Nungesser (R)	Tom Schedler (R)	Jeff Landry (R)	Ron Henson (R) (Note: Acting Treasurer from January 9, 2018 to November 18, 2017.)	Mike Strain (R)	Jim Donelon (R)	25R, 14D	61R, 41D, 3I	Bill Cassidy (R)	John Kennedy (R)	5R, 1D	Trump/ Pence (R) ✓
2018	John Bel; Edwards (D)	Billy Nungesser (R)	Kyle Ardoin (R) (Note: Acting Secretary of State from May 9 to May 23, 2018. Confirmed Secretary of State from then onward.)	Jeff Landry (R)	John Schroder (R)	Mike Strain (R)	Jim Donelon (R)	25R, 14D	61R, 41D, 3I	Bill Cassidy (R)	John Kennedy (R)	5R, 1D	Trump/ Pence (R) ✓
2019	John Bel; Edwards (D)	Billy Nungesser (R)	Kyle Ardoin (R)	Jeff Landry (R)	John Schroder (R)	Mike Strain (R)	Jim Donelon (R)	25R, 14D	61R, 39D, 5I	Bill Cassidy (R)	John Kennedy (R)	5R, 1D	Trump/ Pence (R) ✓
2020	John Bel; Edwards (D)	Billy Nungesser (R)	Kyle Ardoin (R)	Jeff Landry (R)	John Schroder (R)	Mike Strain (R)	Jim Donelon (R)	27R, 12D	68R, 35D, 2I	Bill Cassidy (R)	John Kennedy (R)	5R, 1D	Trump/ Pence (R) ✗
2021	John Bel; Edwards (D)	Billy Nungesser (R)	Kyle Ardoin (R)	Jeff Landry (R)	John Schroder (R)	Mike Strain (R)	Jim Donelon (R)	27R, 12D	68R, 35D, 2I	Bill Cassidy (R)	John Kennedy (R)	5R, 1D	Trump/ Pence (R) ✗
2021	John Bel; Edwards (D)	Billy Nungesser (R)	Kyle Ardoin (R)	Jeff Landry (R)	John Schroder (R)	Mike Strain (R)	Jim Donelon (R)	27R, 12D	69R, 34D, 2I (Note: Malinda White switched parties from Democratic to Independent on July 1, 2021, then switched from Independent to Republican on June 14, 2022.)	Bill Cassidy (R)	John Kennedy (R)	5R, 1D	Trump/ Pence (R) ✗
2022	John Bel; Edwards (D)	Billy Nungesser (R)	Kyle Ardoin (R)	Jeff Landry (R)	John Schroder (R)	Mike Strain (R)	Jim Donelon (R)	27R, 12D	69R, 34D, 2I	Bill Cassidy (R)	John Kennedy (R)	5R, 1D	Trump/ Pence (R) ✗
2023	John Bel; Edwards (D)	Billy Nungesser (R)	Kyle Ardoin (R)	Jeff Landry (R)	John Schroder (R)	Mike Strain (R)	Jim Donelon (R)	27R, 12D		Bill Cassidy (R)	John Kennedy (R)	5R, 1D	Trump/ Pence (R) ✗
2023	John Bel; Edwards (D)	Billy Nungesser (R)	Kyle Ardoin (R)	Jeff Landry (R)	John Schroder (R)	Mike Strain (R)	Jim Donelon (R)	27R, 12D	71R, 33D, 1I (Note: Francis C. Thompson and Jeremy LaCombe switched parties from Democratic to Republican on March 16, 2023 and April 10, 2023, respectively. Mandie Landry switched parties from Independent to Democratic on March 29, 2023.)	Bill Cassidy (R)	John Kennedy (R)	5R, 1D	Trump/ Pence (R) ✗
2024	Jeff Landry (R)	Billy Nungesser (R)	Nancy Landry (R)	Liz Murrill (R)	John Fleming (R)	Mike Strain (R)	Tim Temple (R)	28R, 11D	73R, 32D	Bill Cassidy (R)	John Kennedy (R)	5R, 1D	Trump/ Vance (R) ✓
2025	Jeff Landry (R)	Billy Nungesser (R)	Nancy Landry (R)	Liz Murrill (R)	John Fleming (R)	Mike Strain (R)	Tim Temple (R)	28R, 11D	73R, 32D	Bill Cassidy (R)	John Kennedy (R)	4R, 2D	Trump/ Vance (R) ✓
2026	Jeff Landry (R)	Billy Nungesser (R)	Nancy Landry (R)	Liz Murrill (R)	John Fleming (R)	Mike Strain (R)	Tim Temple (R)	28R, 11D	73R, 32D	Bill Cassidy (R)	John Kennedy (R)	4R, 2D	Trump/ Vance (R) ✓

Key to party colors and abbreviations for members of the U.S. Congress and other politicians or officials
Alaskan Independence (AKIP) Know Nothing (KN) American Labor (AL) Anti-Jacksonian (Anti-J); National Republican (NR) Anti-Administration (AA) Anti-Masonic (Anti-M) Conservative (Con) Covenant (Cov)	Democratic (D) Democratic–Farmer–Labor (DFL) Democratic–NPL (D-NPL) Dixiecrat (Dix), States' Rights (SR) Democratic-Republican (DR) Farmer–Labor (FL) Federalist (F); Pro-Administration (PA)	Free Soil (FS) Fusion (Fus) Greenback (GB) Independence (IPM) Jacksonian (J) Liberal (Lib) Libertarian (L) National Union (NU)	Nonpartisan League (NPL) Nullifier (N) Opposition Northern (O); Opposition Southern (O) Populist (Pop) Progressive (Prog) Prohibition (Proh) Readjuster (Rea)	Republican (R) Silver (Sv) Silver Republican (SvR) Socialist (Soc) Union (U) Unconditional Union (UU) Vermont Progressive (VP) Whig (W)	Independent (I) Nonpartisan (NP)

== See also ==
- Law and government in Louisiana
- Politics of Louisiana
- Elections in Louisiana
