= Stanislas Wrotnowski =

American politician

Stanislaw Wrotnowski (sometimes Wrotnoski) (1803 - ?) was a Polish exile who had a cattle farm and sugar refinery and served as Secretary of State of Louisiana during the American Civil War.

Wrotnowski was a farmer and president of a municipality board in Poland before the 1830 November Uprising in which he was actively involved. He was wounded in one of the battles before going on to serve as the Chief of the Bureau of the Secretary of War. After the war he moved to France and was involved with multiple scientific societies, before being ordered to leave the country by the French government and sent to the United States. He reached New Orleans in 1849 along with his wife and six children, and he refused the $5 allocated to the exiles by the French government. From New Orleans he moved with his family to Baton Rouge, Louisiana and started farming again before being forced to leave by soldiers of the Confederate Army who seized his hundred cattle and other animals. He had come to the attention of the confederates as he employed no slaves either on his farm or at his sugar refinery.

In 1864 he was the convention registrar for the election of delegates for the Baton Rouge district. He was nominated for the position of secretary of state, which he then won in the following elections. He used the office to oppose Governor James Madison Wells who he claimed was appointing mostly ex-confederate army soldiers and rebellion sympathizers.

In 1871 he served as President of the Board of Control of the Louisiana State Penitentiary.

In 1872 his book Louisiana, its geography and resources was published.

Of his children Louis Wrotnowski was a civil engineer who served as an aid to General Godfrey Weitzel and died at Port Hudson, Louisiana. Louis was also a cartographer who produced maps for the Unionists, mapping the Mississippi River from Baton Rouge to Vicksburg, Mississippi. Another son had an honorable commission under General Nathaniel P. Banks and served under General Francis J. Herron in Texas. He also had a daughter, a musician, who married an Army Chaplin Reverend Chubbucky.

== See also ==
- List of speakers of the Louisiana House of Representatives
