= Emile Honoré =

African American politician (fl. 1868–1877)

Emile Honoré was a politician in Louisiana who served as Secretary of State of Louisiana and in the Louisiana House of Representatives representing Pointe Coupee Parish between 1868–1870 and 1874–1876. He was African-American and a Republican. Honoré served on the powerful Ways and Means Committee in the House.

Honoré become the Secretary of State of Louisiana in 1877 under Republican Governor Stephen B. Packard, which made him the first African-American to have held that position. However, Packard's election was disputed, and as part of the Compromise of 1877 to resolve the disputed presidential election of 1876, President Rutherford B. Hayes recognized Packard's Democratic opponent, Francis T. Nicholls, as the winner, leading Packard to step down in April. Will A. Strong promptly took over from Honoré as Secretary of State.
