= Politics of Louisiana =

Politics of a U.S. state

The politics of Louisiana involve political parties, laws and the state constitution, and the many other groups that influence the governance of the state. The state was a one-party Deep South state dominated by the Democratic Party from the end of Reconstruction to the 1960s, forming the backbone of the "Solid South." This was due to the near-total disenfranchisement of the state's large African-American population during this time, who mostly voted Republican. The Civil Rights era turned the state into a competitive one on the federal level, as it voted for the nationwide winner in every election between 1972 and 2004. It remained Democratic on the state and local level until the turn of the 21st century, allowing Republicans to win control of the state legislature and every statewide office in 2011. Republicans won a United States Senate seat for Louisiana in the election of 2004, for the first time since 1876. Republicans captured both seats in the election of 2014 for the first time since 1872. In the election of 2008, the state voted for a losing presidential candidate for the first time since 1968. Democrats won less than 40% of the presidential popular vote in the state in the elections of 2016 and 2020.

== History ==
In the aftermath of the American Civil War during Reconstruction, Louisiana was governed by Republicans. They were soon replaced by Democrats who established Jim Crow laws that eliminated Black political participation for nearly 100 years. Between 1880 and 1960, the state voted Republican for president once (in 1956), and exclusively elected Democrats to all statewide offices and they dominated the state legislature and congressional delegations.

In the early 20th century, Louisiana retained a pocket of Republican strength centered around the sugar parishes west of New Orleans, where farmers favored the GOP's position on protective tariffs. According to The Louisiana Elections of 1960, whose authors include the late sociologist Perry H. Howard, from 1920, the year of the election of Warren G. Harding as U.S. President until 1956, the reelection of Dwight D. Eisenhower, "a number of parishes, many in close proximity, have consistently supported the Republican party at close to or significantly above the presidential Republican vote average. Apart from some of the urbanized parishes, the majority of these parishes are in south Louisiana; in fact, they form a cluster in the sugar cultivation area west of the Atchafalaya swamp and along Bayou Lafourche and the Mississippi River below Baton Rouge."

In the decades following the beginning of the Civil Rights Movement and a concomitant reaction against cultural liberalism, the Republicans gained strength in the conservative suburbs of New Orleans and Baton Rouge and for a time in Caddo Parish. The GOP drew increasing support among rural voters elsewhere, including parts of North Louisiana and Southeast Louisiana. These patterns follow trends in other southern states as white control of state Democratic Party structures weakened, and the region became more diverse and more prone to adopt the two-party behavior characteristic of most of the nation.

In time, Republicanism took root in the Shreveport-Bossier City area of northwest Louisiana, with increasing strength, added from Ouachita, Lincoln, Rapides, East Baton Rouge, and Lafayette parishes plus most of the suburban parishes about New Orleans. Two of the smaller Republican-leaning parishes in North Louisiana are La Salle and West Carroll Parish.

Since the construction of the Lake Pontchartrain Causeway in the mid-1950s, the Northshore Region began demonstrating increasingly Republican leanings, first and most notably in Saint Tammany Parish, which as of 2010 had the highest percentage of registered Republican voters in Louisiana. It was the first parish since the Reconstruction Era to leave the Democrats merely a plurality and the first to experience a Republican majority.

In the 1964 election, Republicans won the state by double digits, their largest victory since Reconstruction, as Democratic support collapsed in the Northern part of the state following the passage of the Civil Rights Act of 1964. The Republican victory was not as commanding here as it was in other Deep South states, as they stayed under 60% of the vote. The state soon became a swing state by voting for the nationwide winner in every election between 1972 and 2004.

=== 21st century ===
The political balance in Louisiana was heavily affected by the post-Hurricane Katrina departure from New Orleans. Heavily Democratic New Orleans lost some 1/3 of its population. The overall effect reduced the Democrats' base of support in the state and turned Louisiana into a Republican-leaning state thereafter. New Orleans remained Democratic, electing Mitch Landrieu as mayor in February 2010. In the 2008 elections, Louisiana sent a mixed result, with the election of U.S. Senator John McCain for President and the reelection of Democratic U.S. Senator Mary Landrieu. The other senator, at the time, was Republican David Vitter.

Since that election, Republicans have rapidly come to control nearly every federal and statewide office. Both US Senators are Republicans. Republicans also hold five of the six U.S. Representative seats from Louisiana. Every statewide office is held by a Republican, and both chambers of the state legislature are majority Republican. By contrast, in 1960, not a single Republican served in either house of the Louisiana legislature. The first Republicans to serve in the legislature since Reconstruction were not elected until 1964, and both—Morley A. Hudson and Taylor W. O'Hearn—came from Shreveport.

In 2010, several Democrats switched parties bringing the statehouse under Republican control. In 2011, the special election victories of Fred Mills and Jonathan Perry switched the balance of power in the state senate, leaving Republicans in control of the state legislature for the first time since Reconstruction. Also, the party switch of Attorney General Buddy Caldwell caused the Republican party to control every statewide office. However, this was broken in 2015, when Democrat John Bel Edwards won the governor's race.

Republicans won the first Senate seat since Reconstruction in 2004, with the election of David Vitter. He became the first popularly elected Republican Senator as well. In 2014, Republicans won both Senate seats for the first time since 1872.

Previously there were cultural divides between Democratic voting Roman Catholics in Cajun parts of southern Louisiana and Protestant Republican voting people in northern Louisiana, but by 2019 this gave way to a rural Republican-urban Democratic divide that characterizes other parts of the United States.

== Federal representation ==
Louisiana currently has six House districts. In the 119th Congress, two of Louisiana's seats is held by Democrats and five are held by Republicans:

- Louisiana's 1st congressional district represented by Steve Scalise (R)
- Louisiana's 2nd congressional district represented by Troy Carter (D)
- Louisiana's 3rd congressional district represented by Clay Higgins (R)
- Louisiana's 4th congressional district represented by Mike Johnson (R)
- Louisiana's 5th congressional district represented by Julia Letlow (R)
- Louisiana's 6th congressional district represented by Cleo Fields (D)

Louisiana's two United States senators are Republicans, Bill Cassidy and John Kennedy, serving since 2015 and 2017, respectively.

Louisiana is part of the United States District Court for the Western District of Louisiana, the United States District Court for the Middle District of Louisiana, and the United States District Court for the Eastern District of Louisiana in the federal judiciary. The district's cases are appealed to the New Orleans–based United States Court of Appeals for the Fifth Circuit.

== Corruption ==
Louisiana has long been known for its toleration of political corruption. Bill Dodd, former lieutenant governor and education superintendent, in his book Peapatch Politics: The Earl Long Era in Louisiana Politics, describes corruption as "a way of life, inherited, and made quasi-respectable and legal by the French freebooters who founded, operated, and left us as the governmental blueprint that is still Louisiana's constitutional and civil law." Dodd further notes that some attribute the corruption to "outlaws, gamblers, and fortune hunters who came off the mountains and down the Mississippi River to add their flavor to the Louisiana pot."

== Notable Louisiana political figures ==
- Huey Long, 40th governor of Louisiana (1928-1932) and senator from 1932 until his assassination in 1935. He was a left-wing populist member of the Democratic Party.
- Bobby Jindal, 55th governor of Louisiana (2008-2016)
- Russell B. Long, son of Huey Long, and United States Senator from 1948-1987, where he served as chairman of the Senate Finance Committee from 1966-1981, where he was instrumental in the implementation of Lyndon B. Johnson's Great Society and War On Poverty.
- Edwin Edwards, 50th governor of Louisiana (1972-1980, 1984-1988, 1992-1996), longest serving governor of Louisiana
- David Duke, politician, white supremacist, conspiracy theorist, and former grand wizard of the Knights of the Ku Klux Klan.
- John Kennedy, Junior United States senator from Louisiana since 2017.
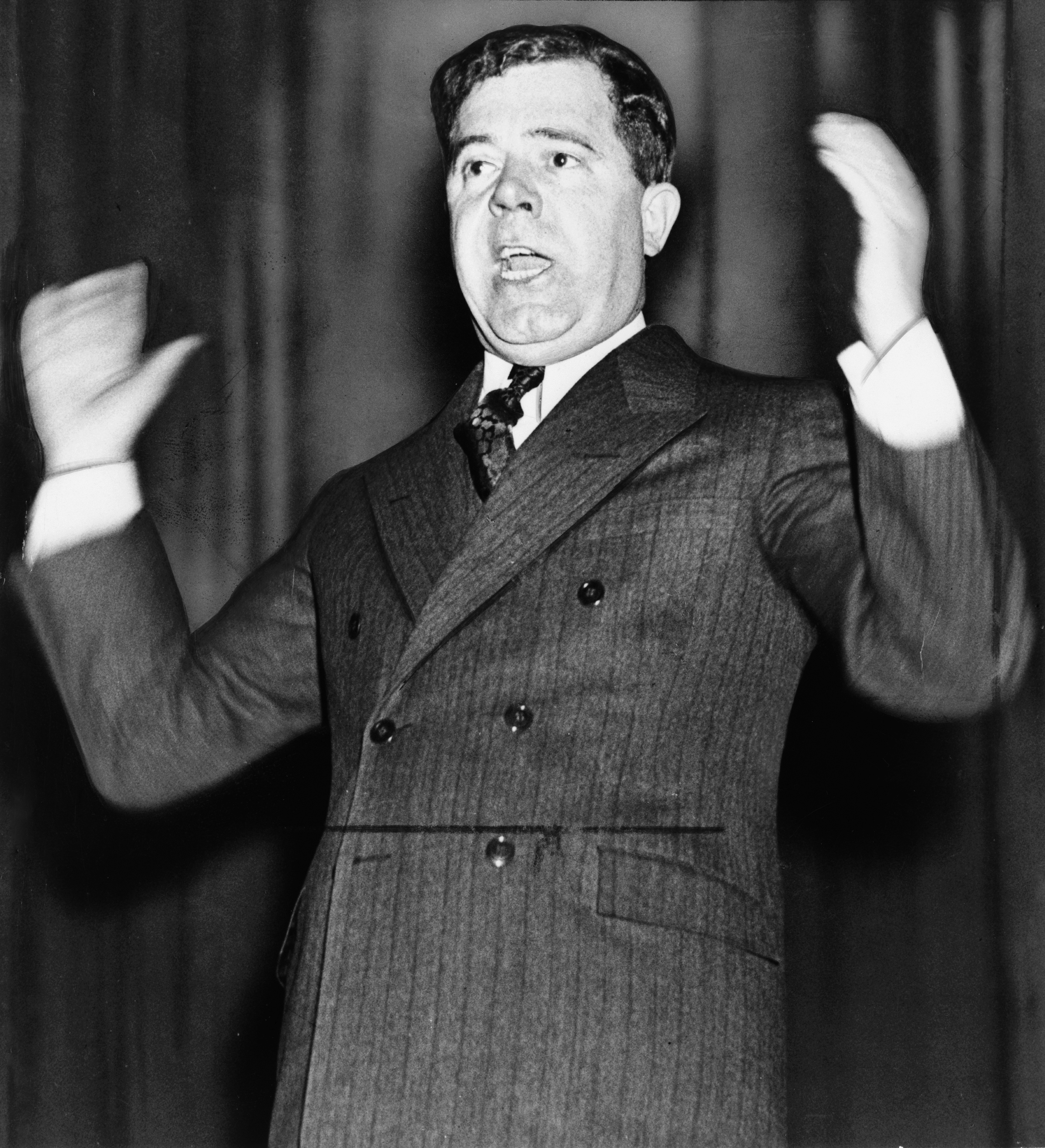
Huey Long

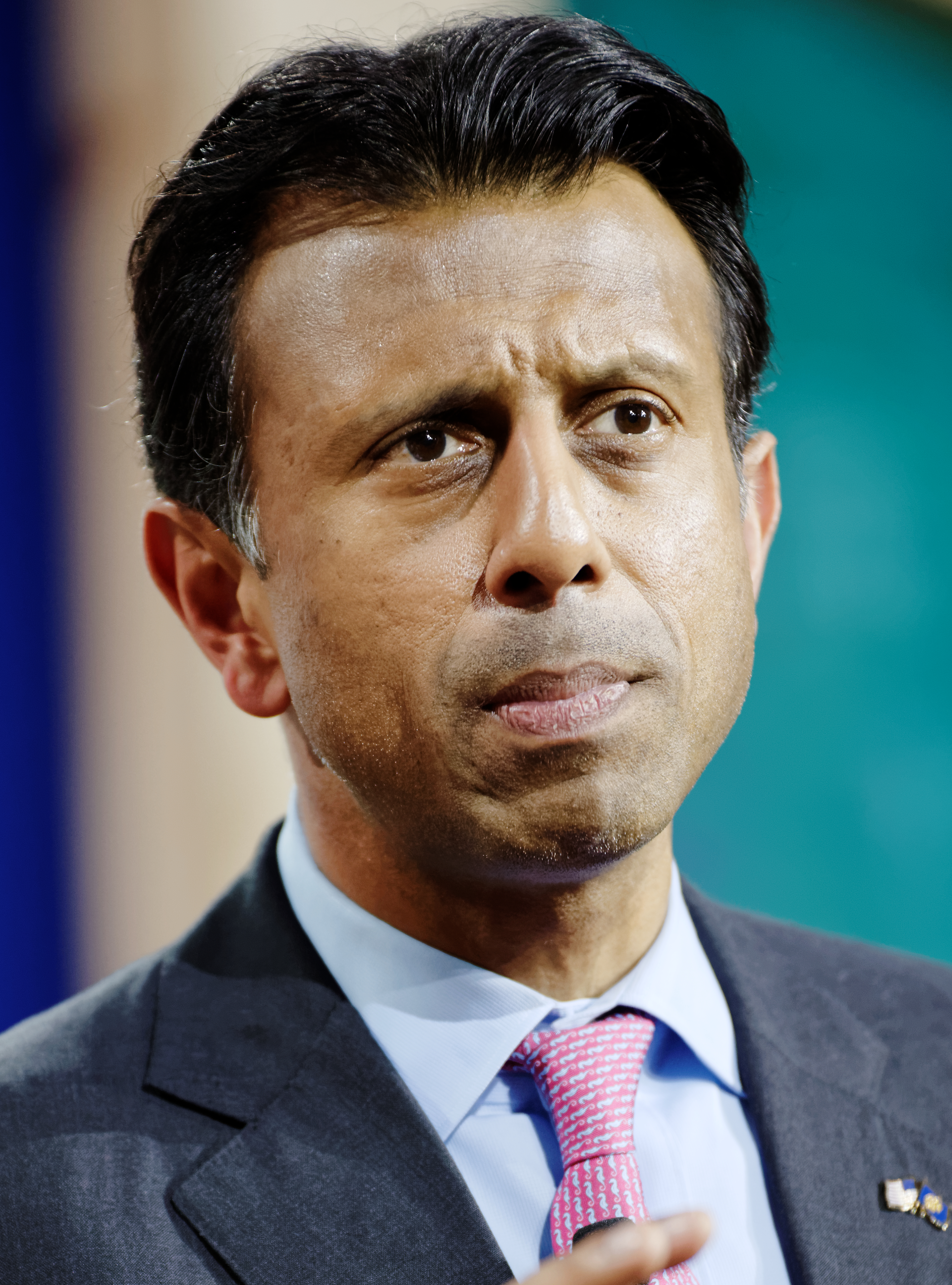
Bobby Jindal

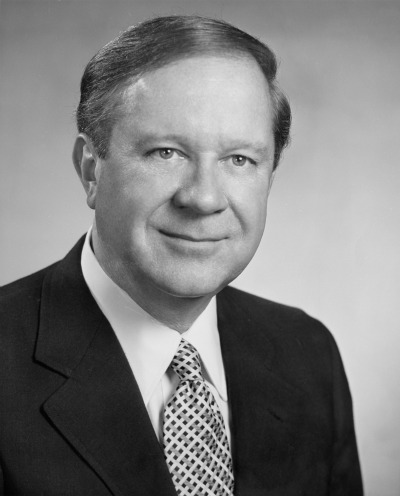
Russell B. Long

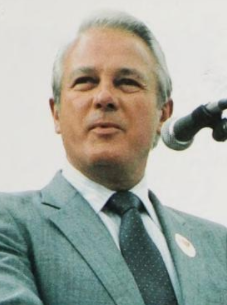
Edwin Edwards

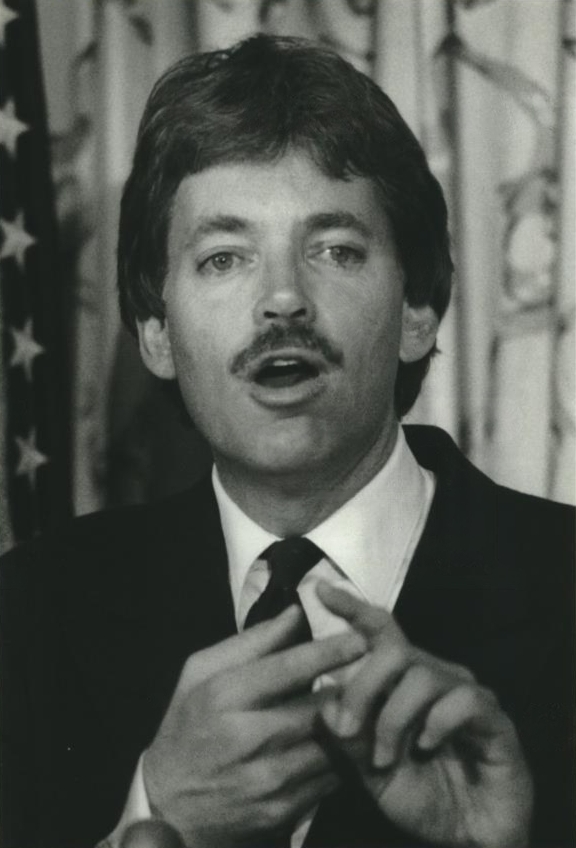
David Duke

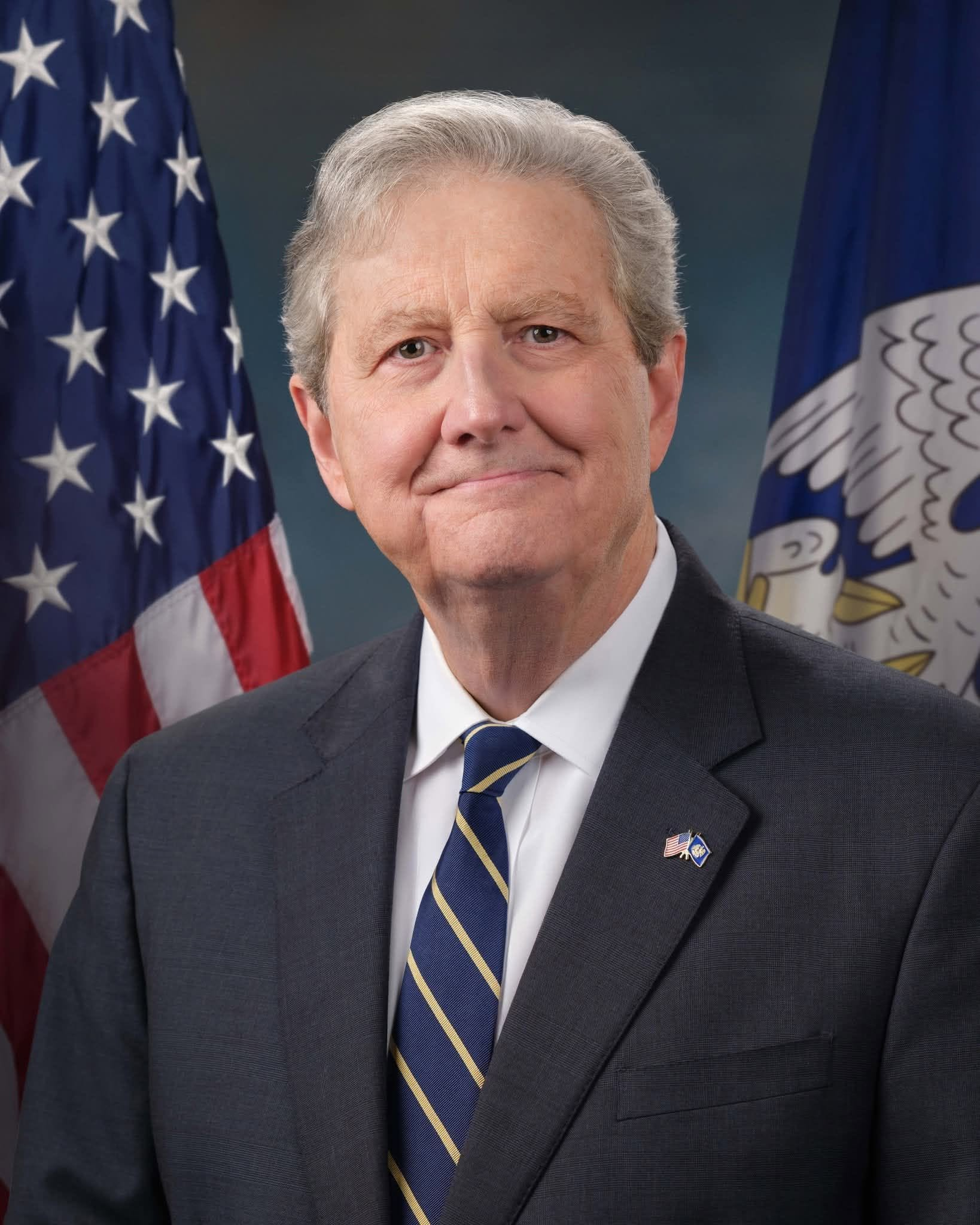
John Kennedy

== See also ==
- Louisiana's congressional delegations
- List of governors of Louisiana
- Political party strength in Louisiana
