= Secretary of State of Louisiana =

Elected constitutional officer of the U.S. state of Louisiana

- Incumbent; Nancy Landry since January 8, 2024
- Louisiana Department of State
- Type: Secretary of State
- Constituting instrument: Article 4, Section 7 of the Louisiana Constitution
- Formation: 1812
- First holder: Louis B. Macarty
- Succession: Second
- Website: sos.la.gov

The secretary of state of Louisiana (French: Secrétaire d'État de la Louisiane) is one of the elected constitutional officers of the U.S. state of Louisiana and serves as the head of the Louisiana Department of State. The position was created by Article 4, Section 7 of the Louisiana Constitution.

The current secretary of state is Nancy Landry.

== Powers and duties ==
Article 4, Section 7 of the Constitution of Louisiana provides for the office of secretary of state.

The secretary administers Louisiana's Address Confidentiality Program, which protects victims of stalking, domestic violence, and sexual abuse. The secretary operates "Louisiana One Call", the state's "call before you dig" program, and accepts applications for the Southeast Louisiana Flood Protection Authority. The office manages an online portal for businesses operating in the state.

The secretary of state's office is responsible for the management of the Old Louisiana Governor's Mansion, the Old Louisiana State Capitol, the State Archives, and seven museums.

The secretary is an ex officio member of the State Bond Commission and the board of directors of the Louisiana Citizens Property Insurance Corporation. They are second in the line of gubernatorial succession.

== Structure and organization ==
The secretary of state's office is located in Baton Rouge. The Louisiana Department of State is composed of eight divisions:

- The Louisiana State Archives is a division of the secretary of state's office, and is the official repository for all historical records of the state.
- The Commissions Division grants commission certificates to state officials, as well as justices of the peace and clergymen (to perform marriages). This division also issues apostilles, and attests and affixes the state seal to pardons issued by the governor.
- The Commercial Division registers corporations and other business entities, administers the state trademark laws, and files liens pursuant to the Uniform Commercial Code. This division also serves as the registered agent for service of process in certain types of lawsuits.
- The Elections Division is responsible for the administration of all elections within the state. Campaign finance and lobbying are regulated by the Louisiana Ethics Administration, a separate agency.
- The Museums Division operates the state's many museums and historical exhibits.
- The Notaries Division licenses and supervises notaries public.
- The Publications Division publishes the state laws of Louisiana, as well as other informational documents of the state government.
- The Voter Outreach Division is responsible for educating and promoting voter rights to current and future voters by coordinating with schools, private organizations, and holding its own voter registration drives.

== List of secretaries of state ==
#	Image	Name	Political party	Term of office
1		Louis B. Macarty	Democraticic-Republican	1812–1816
2		Etienne Mazureau	Democraticic-Republican	1816–1820
3		Pierre Derbigny	Democraticic-Republican; National Republican	1820-1828
4		George A. Waggaman	National Republican	1828-1831
5		George Eustis, Jr.	National Republican; Whig	1831-1834
6		Martin Blache		1834-1836
7		William C. C. Claiborne, Jr.	Whig	1836-1837
8		Alfred E. Forstall		1837-1838
9		Henry Adams Bullard	Whig	1838-1839
10		Levi Pierce	Whig	1839–1845
11		Robert C. Nicholas	Democraticic	1845
12		Zenon Ledoux, Jr.	Democratic	1845
13		Charles Gayarré	Democratic	1845–1852
14		Andrew S. Herron	Democratic	1852–1859
15		Pliny D. Hardy	Democratic	1859–1865
16		Stanislas Wrotnowski	Democratic (Unionist)	1865–1866
17		George E. Bovee	Republican	1866–1872
18		Francis J. Herron	Republican	1872
19		Jack Wharton	Republican	1872-1873
20		P.G. Deslonde	Republican	1873–1877
21		Emile Honoré	Republican	1877
22		Will A. Strong	Democratic	1877–1884
23		Oscar Arroyo	Democratic	1884–1888
24		Leonard F. Mason	Democratic	1888–1892
25		T. S. Adams	Democratic	1892–1896
26		John T. Michel	Democratic	1896–1912
27		Alvin Hebert	Democratic	1912–1914
28		W. F. Millsaps	Democratic	1914–1916
29		James J. Bailey	Democratic	1916–1932 (died in office, 1930)
30		Alice Lee Grosjean	Democratic	1930–1932 (appointed by Governor Long to fill Bailey's terms)
31		E. A. Conway	Democratic	1932–1940
32		Jack P. F. Gremillion	Democratic	1940–1944
33		Wade O. Martin Jr.	Democratic	1944–1976
34		Paul Hardy	Democratic	1976–1980
35		James H. "Jim" Brown	Democratic	1980–1988
36		W. Fox McKeithen	Democratic; Republican	1988–2005
–		Al Ater	Democratic	2005–2006 (Acting)
37		Jay Dardenne	Republican	2006–2010
38		Tom Schedler	Republican	2010–2018 (Acting 2010–2011)
39		Kyle Ardoin	Republican	2018–2024
40		Nancy Landry	Republican	2024–present

== See also ==
- Attorney General of Louisiana

== Works cited ==
- State And Local Government In Louisiana: An Overview (PDF) (11th ed.). Baton Rouge: Louisiana House of Representatives Legislative Services. 2011. OCLC 775011735.
