= Pierre G. Deslondes =

American planter and politician

Pierre George Deslondes, last name sometimes spelled Deslonde (born c. 1825), was an African-American sugar planter who served as Secretary of State of Louisiana during the Reconstruction era. He was a wealthy freeman. He served as secretary of state from 1872 until 1876. He later published the News Pioneer in Plaquemine. He owned $55,000 (~$1.6 million in 2025) worth of property in 1860.

He filed a petition in 1859. He was a Republican organizer in Iberville Parish.

He was the son of George Deslondes (died July 7, 1854) and Eloise Belly. Odile and Victoria were his siblings.

== See also ==
- African American officeholders from the end of the Civil War until before 1900
