= Étienne Mazureau =

American lawyer

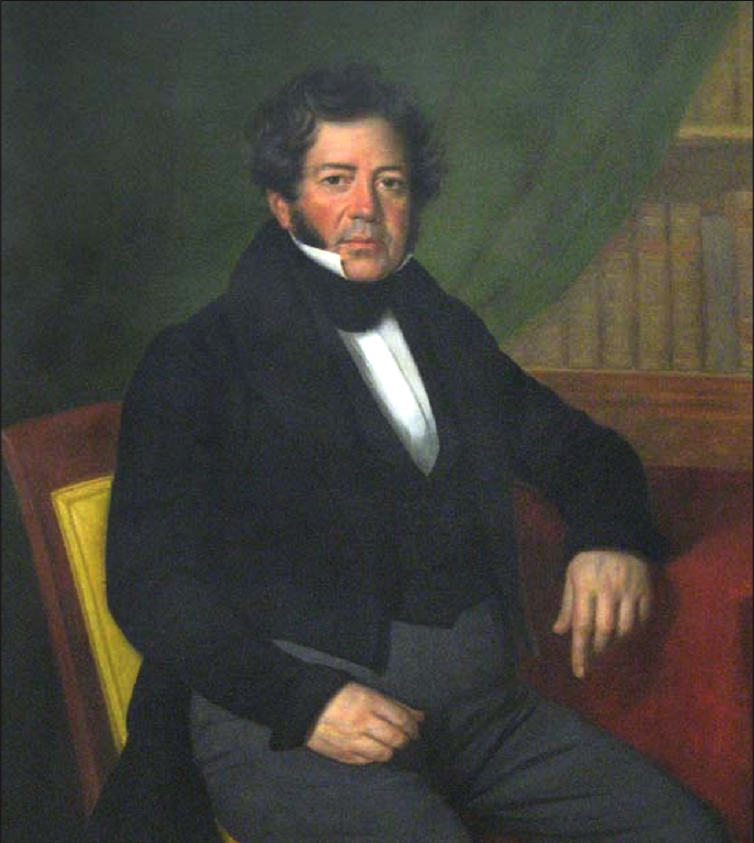
Étienne Mazureau, 1840-43, by Amans or Vaudechamp

Étienne Mazureau (1777–1849) had a distinguished career as a French and later a Louisiana lawyer, serving three times as Attorney General of Louisiana and as Secretary of State of Louisiana.

Mazureau was born in France, moved to Louisiana early in life, and was living in New Orleans by 1805. He married Aimée Grima and had at least five children: Adolphe, Clara (who was the subject of a portrait by Jacques Guillaume Lucien Amans), Polyxeme (who married shipping merchant Joseph Reynes), Edward, and Stephanie.

Mazureau was described as being "[o]f a medium size, compactly built, with flashing dark eyes, intensely black hair, and a brown complexion, he is a perfect specimen of the Southern type, as if to the manner and to the manor born."

He appears in Alexis de Tocqueville's Democracy in America in which he discusses with Tocqueville his views on life in Louisiana, the condition of slaves and other issues.

Mazureau was a law partner with Edward Livingston and practiced law in New Orleans. In 1815, he was appointed the second Attorney General of the State of Louisiana and served for two years. In 1817, Mazureau was appointed Secretary of State of Louisiana, serving until 1821. He was then appointed Attorney General again in 1821 and remained in that position until 1824. His third and final term as Attorney General was from 1833-1841.

He died in New Orleans in 1849.

Legal offices
Preceded by Francois Xavier Martin	Attorney General of Louisiana; 1815–1817	Succeeded by Louis Moreau de Liset
Preceded by Thomas B. Robertson	Attorney General of Louisiana; 1821–1824	Succeeded by Isaac Trimble Preston
Preceded by George Eustis	Attorney General of Louisiana; 1833–1841	Succeeded by Christian Roselius
Political offices
Preceded by Louis B. Macarty	Louisiana Secretary of State; 1817–1821	Succeeded by Pierre Derbigny
