= Francis J. Herron =

American politician

Francis Jay Herron
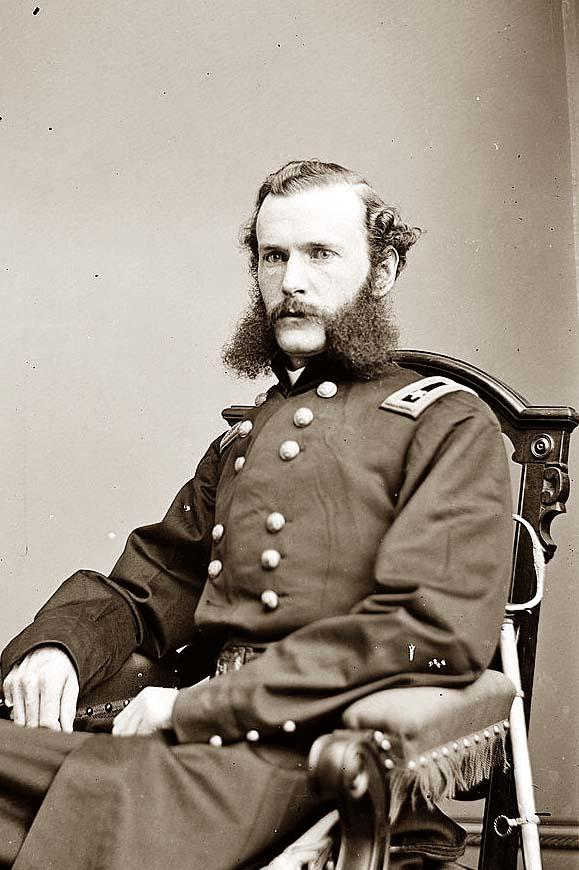
- Born: February 17, 1837; Pittsburgh, Pennsylvania, U.S.
- Died: January 8, 1902 (aged 64); New York City, New York, U.S.
- Burial place: Cavalry Cemetery, Queens, New York
- Military career
- Allegiance: United States of America; Union
- Branch: United States Army; Union Army
- Service years: 1861–1865
- Rank: Major general
- Unit: 9th Iowa Volunteer Infantry Regiment
- Commands: Army of the Frontier; XIII Corps
- Conflicts: American Civil War; Battle of Boonville; Battle of Wilson's Creek; Battle of Pea Ridge; Battle of Prairie Grove; Siege of Vicksburg
- Awards: Medal of Honor

Francis Jay Herron (February 17, 1837 – January 8, 1902) was an American military officer who served as a Union general during the American Civil War. He was a public official in Louisiana after the war.

== Early life ==
Francis J. Herron attended the Western University of Pennsylvania, but left at the age of sixteen without completing his degree to become a bank clerk. In 1855, he joined his three brothers in Dubuque, Iowa, where they established a bank.

== Military career ==
Carte de visite of Herron (left), William Vandever (center) and a third officer, possibly William H. Coyle, c. 1862–1865

In 1859, he organized and was elected captain of a militia company known as the "Governor's Greys," which Herron offered to President-elect Abraham Lincoln in January 1861, two months prior to Lincoln's inauguration.

In April 1861, Herron was appointed captain of Company I, 1st Iowa Volunteer Regiment. He served with Nathaniel Lyon's forces in Missouri, participating in the battles of Boonville and Wilson's Creek. In August, Herron was promoted to lieutenant colonel of the 9th Iowa Volunteer Regiment and fought in the Battle of Pea Ridge, where he was wounded and taken prisoner, but exchanged shortly afterward. He received a promotion to brigadier general of volunteers for his actions in this battle, and later received the Medal of Honor. He commanded both the 2nd and 3rd Divisions of the Army of the Frontier and made a forced march of 114 miles (183 km) in three days to join James G. Blunt's division in western Arkansas. Herron's and Blunt's combined command engaged Thomas C. Hindman in the Battle of Prairie Grove and forced the Confederates to abandon western Arkansas. For his actions at Prairie Grove, Herron was appointed major general of volunteers, becoming the youngest major general on either side at the time of his promotion.

His two divisions were consolidated to form "Herron's Division" which was attached to the XVII Corps. During the siege of Vicksburg, Herron's division was placed on the extreme left flank of the Union lines. Upon the surrender of the city, Ulysses S. Grant chose Herron, along with generals James B. McPherson and John A. Logan, to lead the procession into the city and accept the formal surrender of arms on July 4, 1863. He next led the Yazoo City expedition, capturing the city, a Confederate fleet and supplies. Herron was appointed to command of the XIII Corps and occupied the Texas coast with headquarters at Brownsville. During this time, he provided aid to Mexican President Benito Juárez and prevented French troops of Emperor Maximilian from establishing themselves along the Rio Grande. As the Civil War came to an end, Herron commanded the District of Northern Louisiana.

== Post-war career ==
After the Civil War, he stayed in Baton Rouge. He was a tax collector for a district in New Orleans and served as a United States Marshal from 1867 until 1869. He was the Secretary of State of Louisiana before moving to New York City in 1877, where he practiced law and served as a banker.

== Personal life ==
He was married to Adelaide Wilbray. A widower since 1901, he died of a six-week illness, reportedly a pauper in a tenement in New York City, and was buried in Calvary Cemetery in Queens, New York. He was a member of the Grand Army of the Republic and the Military Order of the Loyal Legion of the United States The commonly accepted story that Herron died in poverty is likely false, as the "tenement" in which he lived at the time of his death was in a fashionable neighborhood and well-appointed.

== Honors ==
A bronze bust of Herron (sculpted by Solon Borglum) was erected in January 1914. It stands on Pemberton Avenue in Vicksburg National Military Park.

== Medal of Honor citation ==
Rank and organization: Lieutenant Colonel, 9th Iowa Infantry. Place and date: At Pea Ridge, Ark., May 7, 1862. Entered service at: Pittsburgh, Pa. Born: February 17, 1837, Pittsburgh, Pa. Date of issue September 26, 1893.

Citation:

Was foremost in leading his men, rallying them to repeated acts of daring, until himself disabled and taken prisoner.

== See also ==
- List of Medal of Honor recipients
- List of American Civil War Medal of Honor recipients: G–L
- List of American Civil War generals (Union)

== Notes ==
Political offices
Preceded by George E. Bovee	Secretary of State of Louisiana; 1872	Succeeded by Jack Wharton
Military offices
Preceded by James Blunt	Commander of the Army of the Frontier; March 30, 1863 - June 1863	Succeeded by none
