= Wade O. Martin Jr. =

American politician

33rd Secretary of State of Louisiana
- In office 1944–1976
- Governor: Jimmie Davis; Earl Long; Robert F. Kennon; John McKeithen; Edwin Edwards
- Preceded by: Jack Gremillion
- Succeeded by: Paul Hardy

Personal details
- Born: Wade Omer Martin Jr. April 18, 1911 Arnaudville, Louisiana, U.S.
- Died: August 6, 1990 (aged 79) Baton Rouge, Louisiana, U.S.
- Party: Democratic
- Education: Southwestern Louisiana Institute; Louisiana State University Law School

Wade Omer Martin Jr. (April 18, 1911 – August 6, 1990) was an American politician. A member of the Democratic Party, he served as secretary of state of Louisiana from 1944 to 1976.

== Life and career ==
Martin was born in Arnaudville, Louisiana, the son of Wade Martin Sr., a sheriff in St. Martin Parish, Louisiana, and Alice Mills. He attended and graduated from Southwestern Louisiana Institute. After graduating, he attended Louisiana State University Law School, earning his law degree in 1935, which after earning his degree, he served in the armed forces during World War II.

Martin served as secretary of state of Louisiana from 1944 to 1976. He lost his seat as secretary of state, in 1975, when he ran as a Democratic candidate for governor of Louisiana. He received 146,368 votes, but lost to incumbent Edwin Edwards, who won with 750,107 votes.

== Death and legacy ==
Martin died on August 6, 1990, at his home in Baton Rouge, Louisiana, at the age of 79.

In 2001, Martin was posthumously inducted into the Louisiana Political Museum and Hall of Fame.
