= W. E. Anderson =

Canadian doctor and antiquarian

William Edmund Anderson (1871–1938) was a Canadian medical doctor and antiquarian.

Anderson was born in Orillia, Ontario. He was responsible for a significantly large, possibly the largest, mass donation of aboriginal artifacts to the Hudson's Bay Company in 1933. He also contributed articles to The Beaver. He died in Lake Alma, Saskatchewan.
