= Paul Hardy (politician) =

American politician

Paul Jude Hardy

48th Lieutenant Governor of Louisiana
- In office March 14, 1988 – January 13, 1992
- Governor: Buddy Roemer
- Preceded by: Robert Louis Freeman Sr.
- Succeeded by: Melinda Schwegmann

Secretary of State of Louisiana
- In office March 1976 – March 10, 1980
- Governor: Edwin Edwards
- Preceded by: Wade O. Martin Jr.
- Succeeded by: James H. "Jim" Brown

Louisiana State Senator from Iberia and St. Martin parishes
- In office 1972–1976
- Preceded by: Francis Romero
- Succeeded by: Oswald A. Decuir

Personal details
- Born: October 18, 1942 (age 83) Lafayette, Louisiana, U.S.
- Party: Republican (1987–present); Democratic (before 1987)
- Spouse: Sandra "Sandi" Gatlin Hardy
- Children: 2
- Relatives: Robert Angelle (uncle)
- Education: Cecilia High School; University of Louisiana at Lafayette; Loyola University New Orleans College of Law
- Profession: Attorney

Paul Jude Hardy (born October 18, 1942) is an American attorney from Baton Rouge, in the U.S. state of Louisiana, who was the first Republican to have been elected lieutenant governor of the U.S. state of Louisiana since Reconstruction. He served in the second-ranking post under Governor Buddy Roemer from 1988 to 1992.

== Background ==
Hardy was born in Lafayette, Louisiana. In 1960, he graduated from Cecilia High School. In 1965, he received his bachelor's degree from the University of Louisiana at Lafayette, then the University of Southwestern Louisiana, from which his mother also graduated. While Hardy was on the USL track team, he won the Gulf States Conference high jump competition for two consecutive years.

In 1966, Hardy received his law degree from Loyola University College of Law in New Orleans, and at the age of twenty-three, he began practicing law in St. Martinville with the firm Willis and Hardy.

== State senator and secretary of state ==
In 1972, Hardy was elected as a Democratic state senator from Iberia and St. Martin parishes. The defunct Baton Rouge State Times named him the "Outstanding Newcomer" of the year after his first legislative session in 1972. He served alongside fellow Democrat Carl W. Bauer, who represented St. Mary and St. Martin parishes.

In 1974, state Senator Hardy was named "Conservationist of the Year" among the elected official category by the Louisiana Wildlife Federation.

== Republican lieutenant governor ==
Hardy switched parties and ran as a Republican in 1987 for lieutenant governor. First though he was for two weeks in January 1987 a gubernatorial candidate once again. After intraparty rival, U.S. Representative Bob Livingston of suburban New Orleans, defeated Hardy by a five-to-one margin at a caucus straw poll in Alexandria, Hardy said that he would not be a disrupting factor in the race. He therefore endorsed Livingston and incorrectly predicted that Livingston would be elected governor that year.

As lieutenant governor, Hardy led the way to enact legislation creating "Tax Free Shopping," which still today gives foreigners an incentive to visit Louisiana. In turn, this concept has resulted in increases in tourism-related jobs, and in 1989 alone increased tourist spending by a record $1.2 billion.

In 1985, Hardy had assisted local entrepreneurs in the production of the full-length feature film of the Cajun movie Belizaire the Cajun which was filmed in at Acadian Village in Lafayette. He was the associate producer and played a bit part in the movie. Under his leadership thereafter as lieutenant governor, the economic impact of the movie industry increased by $51 million.

In 1989, Phi Kappa Theta national fraternal organization presented Hardy with the "Man of Achievement" award. In 1991, he was presented with "The Order of the Plimsoll," the highest award of the New Orleans World Trade Center.

== Private life in Baton Rouge ==
Hardy is an attorney, banker, businessman, and political consultant residing in Baton Rouge with his wife Sandra "Sandi" Gatlin Hardy (also born 1943), a native of Grant Parish in north Louisiana. They have two children and two granddaughters. Gregory Paul Hardy (born 1966) his wife, Dedi, and their daughter Heather Gayle Hardy reside in Baton Rouge, Louisiana, where he practices law. Daughter Yvette Rachal Hardy Gross is a ULL graduate residing in Baton Rouge with her husband, Darrell Gross, along with their daughter Jessica Yvette Gross.

Party political offices
Preceded by Larry Napoleon Cooper	Republican nominee for Lieutenant Governor of Louisiana; 1987, 1991	Succeeded by Suzanne Mayfield Krieger
Political offices
Preceded by Robert Louis "Bobby" Freeman	Lieutenant Governor of Louisiana; 1988–1992	Succeeded by Melinda Schwegmann
Preceded by Wade O. Martin Jr.	Secretary of State of Louisiana; 1976–1980	Succeeded by James Harvey "Jim" Brown Jr.
Louisiana State Senate
Preceded by Francis Romero	Louisiana State Senator from Iberia and St. Martin parishes 1972–1976	Succeeded by Oswald A. Decuir
