= Oscar Arroyo =

Louisiana politician

Oscar Arroyo was an American public official and politician in Louisiana. He served as Secretary of State of Louisiana from 1884 to 1888. He was a Democrat, Catholic, and of Spanish ancestry.
