= Isaac Trimble Preston =

American judge (1793–1852)

Isaac Trimble Preston (1793 – July 4, 1852) was a 19th-century Louisiana lawyer, politician, and Justice of the Louisiana Supreme Court.

Preston was born in Rockbridge County, Virginia, the son of Francis Preston. In a letter to James Madison, Francis Preston suggests Isaac's birth to have been illegitimate, describing the younger Preston to have been "the fruit of Youthfull (sic) folly." He studied at Greenville College in Greene County, Tennessee and graduated from Yale College in 1812 as class valedictorian. He began studies as Litchfield Law School in Litchfield, Connecticut the same year, but put his education on hold to join the Army as a captain in the 35th Infantry during the War of 1812 on March 31, 1813. He received an honorable discharge in June 1815 and resumed his legal studies under William Wirt in Norfolk, Virginia.

Preston settled in New Orleans, Louisiana and began a law practice. He twice served terms as Attorney General of Louisiana from 1824 to 1828 and again from 1843 to 1846, and also served as land office register in New Orleans around 1829. He was a member of the Louisiana Constitutional Convention in 1844 and served a term in the Louisiana House of Representatives in 1845. In 1850, he was appointed to the Louisiana Supreme Court where he remained until his death.

Preston had a great interest in developing better transportation throughout the south and was a promoter of a railroad from New Orleans to Jackson, Mississippi. He also pursued charitable interests and gave land for the Methodist Episcopal Church in Carrollton in 1843.

Preston married Catherine Lawn Layton, daughter of Robert Layton and Susan Gilchrist, on November 20, 1828 and together they had six children, one of whom died in infancy. After Catherine's death in 1842, he got married again to Margaret Hewes, the widow of his father-in-law, in 1845. He died in the explosion of the steamboat St. James on Lake Pontchartrain which was engaged in a race from Biloxi, Mississippi to New Orleans.

== Sources ==
- Litchfield Historical Society
- Gulf Coast Lagniappe

Legal offices
Preceded by Etienne Mazureau	Attorney General of Louisiana; 1824–1828	Succeeded by Alonzo Morphy
Preceded by Christian Roselius	Attorney General of Louisiana; 1843–1846	Succeeded by William Augustus Elmore
