= Jack Wharton =

American politician

Jack Wharton served as secretary of state of Louisiana from 1872 to 1873. He was a Republican. He was appointed by Louisiana Governor Henry Warmouth to succeed Francis J. Herron. Attorney General Simeon Belden sued to block him from taking office as secretary of state.
