= Christian Roselius =

Louisiana lawyer

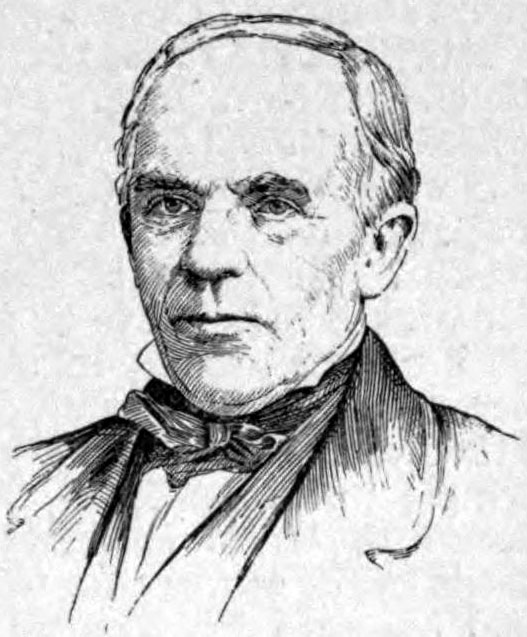

Personal details
- Born: 10 August 1803 near Bremen, Duchies of Bremen and Verden (now Germany)
- Died: 5 September 1873; New Orleans, Louisiana, U.S.

Christian Roselius (10 August 1803—5 September 1873) was a German-born American lawyer, and educator in Louisiana. He was the Attorney General of Louisiana, and served for a term of two years from 1841 to 1843.

== Biography ==
Roselius was born 10 August 1803 near Bremen, Duchies of Bremen and Verden (now Germany). His early education was limited to the elementary schooling. In 1819, he left Germany on board the bark Jupiter for New Orleans, having secured his passage by an indenture. He arrived in Louisiana on July 11, 1820, and was then employed for several years in a printing office. In 1825, with a partner, he established and edited the first literary journal published in Louisiana. It was called The Halcyon, and, failing to prove remunerative, was abandoned for the study of the law, Roselius supporting himself during this time by teaching.

His legal studies were pursued in company with his friend, Alexander Dimitry, in the office of Auguste Devesac, beginning in December 1826 and terminating in March 1828, at which time he was admitted to practice by the Louisiana Supreme Court, consisting of Judges Martin, Matthews, and Porter. His love of the civil law became a passion, and soon placed him in the front rank and eventually at the head of the Louisiana bar.

In 1841 he was appointed Attorney General of Louisiana and served for a term of two years. During the same decade he was honored with an invitation to become the law partner in Washington of Daniel Webster, which he, however, declined, preferring to remain in the South.

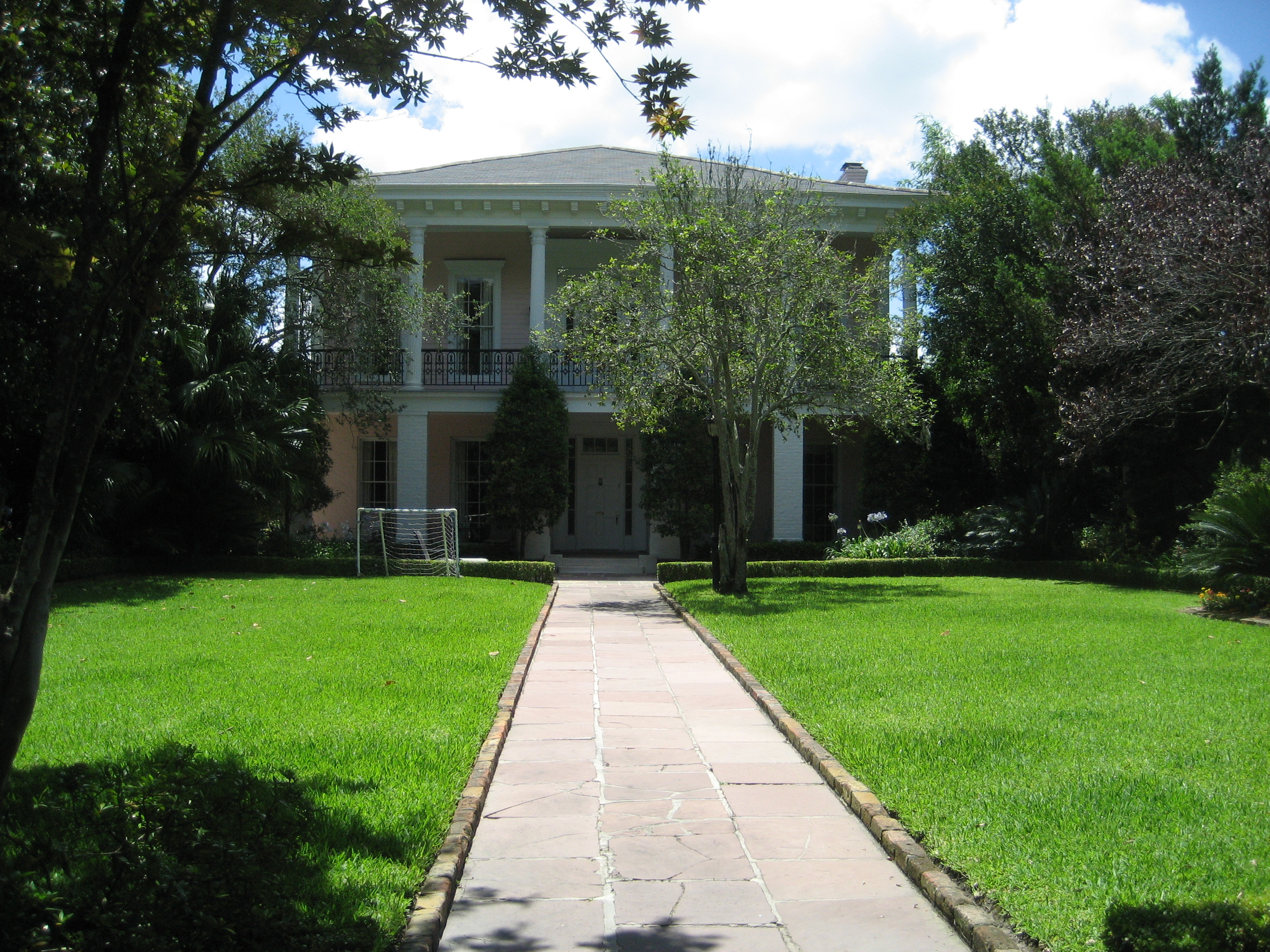
Christian Roselius House in Audubon, New Orleans

For many years, Roselius was dean of the faculty of the University of Louisiana, and for the last 23 years of his life professor of civil law. An opponent of secession, he was offered the highest place in the reconstructed Louisiana Supreme Court, but he declined to accept the appointment unless the court should be secured from military interference. Roselius possessed one of the finest private libraries in the South. It was particularly rich in the Latin classics, of which he was a constant reader, and in Shakespeariana, of which he was a devoted student. He conversed equally well in English, French, and German.

His house and spacious grounds at Greenville, a suburb of New Orleans, was noted for its generous hospitality, few persons of distinction visiting New Orleans during the last two decades of his life without being entertained by Roselius, who was a cheery and charming host. His hand and purse were always open to the unfortunate, and one of several visits to his native land was for the sole purpose of aiding some of his less prosperous kinsmen. By 1860, Roselius owned fifteen houses around New Orleans, and possessed nine enslaved black people.

He died on 5 September 1873 in New Orleans.

== Notes ==
Legal offices
Preceded by Etienne Mazureau	Attorney General of Louisiana; 1841–1843	Succeeded by Isaac Trimble Preston
