= George E. Bovee =

American politician

George E. Bovee was an American politician. He served as Secretary of State of Louisiana from 1866 to 1872 during the Reconstruction era after the American Civil War. He was a Republican.

He was elected Secretary of State on a third ballot.

In 1871 he was treasurer and secretary of the St. James Parish public school board.

In 1875 he was accused of attempting to rig an election in which he was a state senate candidate.

Albert Bovee was his son.
