= 2019 Louisiana elections =

A general election was held in the U.S. state of Louisiana on October 12, 2019, with a runoff on November 16, 2019, for races in which no candidate was able to secure an absolute majority. Louisiana is the only state that has a jungle primary system (California and Washington have a similar top two primary system).

== Governor ==
Incumbent Democratic Governor John Bel Edwards was re-elected for a second term in office.

== Lieutenant governor ==
Incumbent Republican lieutenant governor Billy Nungesser was re-elected for a second term in office.

== Attorney general ==
Incumbent Republican attorney general Jeff Landry was re-elected for a second term in office.

== Secretary of State ==
2019 Louisiana Secretary of State election
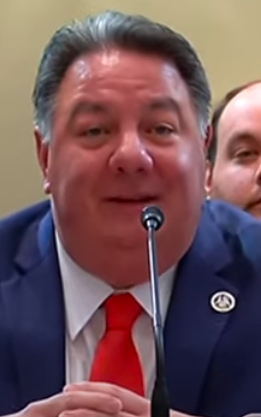
| Nominee | Kyle Ardoin | Gwen Collins-Greenup |
| Party | Republican | Democratic |
| First round | 528,273; 41.1% | 434,609; 33.8% |
| Runoff | 867,449; 59.1% | 601,102; 40.9% |
| Nominee | Thomas Kennedy III | Amanda Smith |
| Party | Republican | Republican |
| First round | 244,622; 19.0% | 78,968; 6.1% |
| Runoff | Eliminated | Eliminated |
- Ardoin: 30–40% 40–50% 50–60% 60–70% 70–80% 80–90% >90% Collins-Greenup: 30–40% 40–50% 50–60% 60–70% 70–80% 80–90% >90% Kennedy: 20–30% 30–40% 40–50% 50–60% 60–70% 70–80% Smith: 50–60% Tie: 30–40% 40–50% 50–60% No data Ardoin: 30–40% 40–50% 50–60% 60–70% 70–80% 80–90% >90% Collins-Greenup: 30–40% 40–50% 50–60% 60–70% 70–80% 80–90% >90% Kennedy: 20–30% 30–40% 40–50% 50–60% 60–70% 70–80% Smith: 50–60% Tie: 30–40% 40–50% 50–60% No data Ardoin: 50–60% 60–70% 70–80% 80–90% >90% Collins-Greenup: 50–60% 60–70% 70–80% 80–90% >90% Tie: 50% No data Ardoin: 50–60% 60–70% 70–80% 80–90% >90% Collins-Greenup: 50–60% 60–70% 70–80% 80–90% >90% Tie: 50% No data
Secretary of State before election
Kyle Ardoin
Republican
Elected Secretary of State
Kyle Ardoin
Republican

=== Candidates ===
==== Republican Party ====
- Kyle Ardoin, incumbent Louisiana Secretary of State
- Thomas Kennedy III, candidate for Louisiana Secretary of State in 2018
- Amanda Smith, paralegal

==== Democratic Party ====
- Gwen Collins-Greenup, candidate for Louisiana Secretary of State in 2018

=== General election ===
==== Results ====
Louisiana Secretary of State election, 2019
| Party | Candidate | Votes | % |
|---|---|---|---|
| Republican | Kyle Ardoin (incumbent) | 528,273 | 41.1 |
| Democratic | Gwen Collins-Greenup | 434,609 | 33.8 |
| Republican | Thomas Kennedy III | 244,622 | 19.0 |
| Republican | Amanda Smith | 78,968 | 6.1 |
| Total votes | | 1,286,472 | 100.0% |

=== Runoff ===
==== Polling ====
| Poll source | Date(s) administered | Sample size (Note: Key: A – all adults RV – registered voters LV – likely voters V – unclear) | Margin of error | Kyle Ardoin (R) | Gwen Collins-Greenup (D) | Undecided |
|---|---|---|---|---|---|---|
| JMC Analytics (R) | October 24–26, 2019 | 600 (LV) | ± 4.0% | 48% | 32% | 20% |

==== Results ====
Louisiana Secretary of State runoff election, 2019
| Party | Candidate | Votes | % |
|---|---|---|---|
| Republican | Kyle Ardoin (incumbent) | 867,449 | 59.1 |
| Democratic | Gwen Collins-Greenup | 601,102 | 40.9 |
| Total votes | | 1,468,551 | 100.0 |
| Republican hold | | | |

== State Treasurer ==
2019 Louisiana Treasurer election
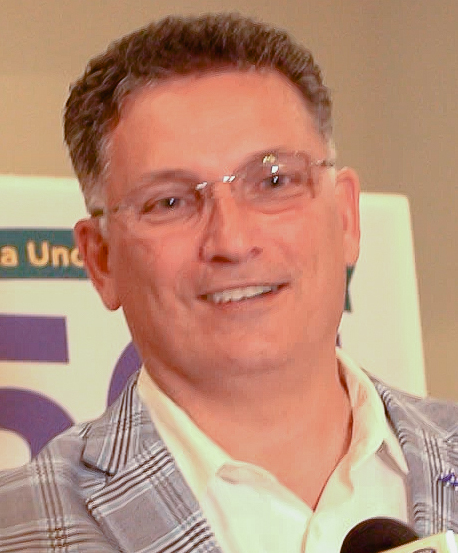

| Nominee | John Schroder | Derrick Edwards | Teresa Kenny |
| Party | Republican | Democratic | Independent |
| Popular vote | 769,443 | 321,423 | 69,910 |
| Percentage | 60.0% | 34.6% | 5.5% |
- Schroder: 30–40% 40–50% 50–60% 60–70% 70–80% 80–90% >90% Edwards: 30–40% 40–50% 50–60% 70–80% 80–90% >90% Kenny: 50–60% Tie: 30–40% 40–50% 50% No Data
Treasurer before election
John Schroder
Republican
Elected Treasurer
John Schroder
Republican

=== Candidates ===
==== Republican Party ====
- John Schroder, incumbent Louisiana State Treasurer

==== Democratic Party ====
- Derrick Edwards, attorney and candidate for Louisiana State Treasurer in 2017

==== Independents ====
- Teresa Kenny, entrepreneur

=== General election ===
==== Results ====
Louisiana State Treasurer election, 2019
| Party | Candidate | Votes | % |
|---|---|---|---|
| Republican | John Schroder (incumbent) | 769,443 | 60.0 |
| Democratic | Derrick Edwards | 442,753 | 34.5 |
| Independent | Teresa Kenny | 69,910 | 5.5 |
| Total votes | | 1,282,106 | 100.0% |
| Republican hold | | | |

== Commissioner of Agriculture and Forestry ==
2019 Louisiana Commissioner of Agriculture and Forestry election
| Nominee | Michael G. Strain | Marguerite Green | Charlie Greer |
| Party | Republican | Democratic | Democratic |
| Popular vote | 724,709 | 259,729 | 106,892 |
| Percentage | 56.8% | 20.3% | 8.4% |
| Nominee | Bradley Zaunbrecher | Peter Williams |
| Party | Republican | Democratic |
| Popular vote | 105,705 | 79,632 |
| Percentage | 8.3% | 6.2% |
- Parish results Strain: 30–40% 40–50% 50–60% 60–70% 70–80% 80–90% Green: 50–60%
Commissioner before election
Michael G. Strain
Republican
Elected Commissioner
Michael G. Strain
Republican

=== Candidates ===
==== Republican Party ====
- Michael Strain, incumbent Louisiana Agriculture and Forestry Commissioner
- Bradley Zaunbrecher, cattle farmer

==== Democratic Party ====
- Marguerite Green, executive director of SPROUT NOLA
- Charlie Greer, former forestry enforcement agent and candidate for Louisiana Commissioner of Agriculture and Forestry in 2015
- Peter Williams, tree farmer

=== General election ===
==== Results ====
Louisiana Commissioner of Agriculture and Forestry election, 2019
| Party | Candidate | Votes | % |
|---|---|---|---|
| Republican | Michael Strain (incumbent) | 724,709 | 56.8 |
| Democratic | Marguerite Green | 259,729 | 20.3 |
| Democratic | Charlie Greer | 106,892 | 8.4 |
| Republican | Bradley Zaunbrecher | 105,705 | 8.3 |
| Democratic | Peter Williams | 79,632 | 6.2 |
| Total votes | | 1,276,667 | 100.0 |
| Republican hold | | | |

== Commissioner of Insurance ==
2019 Louisiana Commissioner of Insurance election
- October 12, 2019
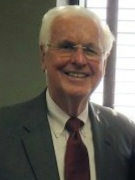

| Nominee | Jim Donelon | Tim Temple |
| Party | Republican | Republican |
| Popular vote | 631,721 | 549,140 |
| Percentage | 53.5% | 46.5% |
- Donelon: 50–60% 60–70% 70–80% 80–90% >90% Temple: 50–60% 60–70% 70–80% 80–90% >90% Tie: 50% No Data
Commissioner of Insurance before election
Jim Donelon
Republican
Elected Commissioner of Insurance
Jim Donelon
Republican

=== Candidates ===
==== Republican Party ====
- Jim Donelon, incumbent Louisiana Insurance Commissioner
- Tim Temple, businessman

=== Polling ===
| Poll source | Date(s) administered | Sample size | Margin of error | Jim Donelon (R) | Tim Temple (R) | Undecided |
|---|---|---|---|---|---|---|
| JMC Analytics (R) | September 19–21, 2019 | 550 (LV) | ± 4.2% | 22% | 20% | 58% |

=== General election ===
==== Results ====
Louisiana Commissioner of Insurance election, 2019
| Party | Candidate | Votes | % |
|---|---|---|---|
| Republican | Jim Donelon (incumbent) | 631,721 | 53.5 |
| Republican | Tim Temple | 549,140 | 46.5 |
| Total votes | | 1,180,861 | 100.0 |
| Republican hold | | | |

== Louisiana State Legislature ==
Republicans gained a two-thirds majority in the State Senate, but in the State House, Democratic challenger Mack Cormier flipped HD 105 and independent Roy Daryl Adams retained his seat in HD 62, blocking the Republicans from gaining a supermajority and allowing John Bel Edwards to veto bills passed by the Legislature.
