= Gil Dozier =

American lawyer, politician, and felon

Louisiana Commissioner of Agriculture and Forestry
- In office May 10, 1976 – March 10, 1980
- Governor: Edwin Edwards
- Preceded by: Dave L. Pearce
- Succeeded by: Bob Odom

Personal details
- Born: Gilbert Lynel Dozier; March 19, 1934 Fields, Louisiana, US
- Died: September 23, 2013 (aged 79) Baton Rouge, Louisiana, US
- Cause of death: Cardiovascular disease
- Resting place: Newlin Cemetery in Singer in Beauregard Parish
- Party: Democratic
- Spouse: Jean Helen Kirkland Dozier
- Domestic partner: Treva Lea Tidwell
- Relations: Gilbert Franklin Hennigan (maternal grandfather); Toby O'Rillion (uncle by marriage)
- Children: Susan Laborde Denise Dupre; Leslie Lynelle Dozier; Carrie Johns; Gilbert Hennigan Dozier Fifteen grandchildren
- Parent(s): A. J. and Sylvia Mae Hennigan Dozier
- Education: University of Louisiana at Lafayette; Louisiana State University Law Center
- Occupation: Lawyer; businessman farmer, rancher Baton Rouge, Louisiana Lafayette, Louisiana

Military service
- Branch/service: United States Air Force
- Rank: Captain; Lieutenant colonel

Gilbert Lynel Dozier (March 19, 1934 – September 23, 2013), was an attorney, businessman, farmer, and rancher who served from 1976 to 1980 as the Louisiana Commissioner of Agriculture and Forestry. A Democrat, Dozier's political career ended with felony convictions and imprisonment for nearly four years. Most of his adult life was spent in and about Baton Rouge, Louisiana.

== Family background ==
Dozier was one of two sons born in rural Fields in Beauregard Parish in southwestern Louisiana to the educators A. J. Dozier (1907–1997) and the former Sylvia Mae Hennigan (1910–1977). Dozier's brother, Kenneth Rufus Dozier (born 1938) of DeRidder, is partly named for their paternal grandfather, Rufus Dozier. Sylvia Dozier's mother, the former Myrtie Mae Whitman, died before her fortieth birthday in 1927 in childbirth with her ninth pregnancy. Sylvia's father, Gilbert Franklin Hennigan, for whom Gil Dozier received his first name, was a rancher, a member and president of the Beauregard Parish School Board, and from 1944 to 1956 a state senator for Allen, Calcasieu, Cameron, Jefferson Davis, and Beauregard parishes.

As chairman of the Senate Education Committee, Hennigan was instrumental in the upgrading in 1950 of McNeese State University in Lake Charles to a four-year institution. Toby O'Rillion, the husband of Dozier's maternal aunt Hope, ran for the office of state comptroller in 1959 on the Bill Dodd intraparty ticket but was eliminated from the runoff election won by Roy R. Theriot, then the mayor of Abbeville in Vermilion Parish. O'Rillion was running to succeed Dodd in the former position of state auditor, renamed comptroller. With the new state constitution of 1974, the comptroller position became non-elected.

A. J. Dozier obtained a master's degree from the University of Arkansas in Fayetteville. He began teaching in 1930 at Northwestern State University in Natchitoches, Louisiana. The family moved to Beauregard Parish, where he taught or was a principal for thirty-seven years in several locations, including Fields, Singer, and Merryville. Sylvia taught in DeRidder. After Sylvia died in 1977, the next year A. J. married the former Elizabeth Jane Huckaby Kelly (1918–2008), the widow of Elton D. Kelly (1916–1968), a football coach at Minden High School in Minden in Webster Parish in northwestern Louisiana, whose team won the Class AA state championship in 1963. The Kellys, who married in 1940, had three children, David Kelly, Kathy Kelly Hynson of Rosenberg, Texas, and Debby Kelly-Hiebert, Gil Dozier's step-siblings. The Kellys were science teachers in Minden; both had earlier been on the faculty at DeRidder High School. After Elton's death, Elizabeth, or "Libby," retired from teaching, became a registered dietitian and worked at various medical facilities in the DeRidder area. She also managed a small apartment complex. She died in 2008 at the age of ninety in Needville in Fort Bend County, Texas.

== Education and military ==
Dozier played basketball from 1952 to 1955 for the Ragin' Cajuns of the University of Louisiana at Lafayette, when the institution was known as the University of Southwestern Louisiana. He obtained his bachelor's degree from ULL in 1955.

From 1957 to 1959, he served in the United States Air Force, having attained the ranks of captain and then lieutenant colonel. He was trained in North Carolina and stationed in California, where the two older of his five children by the former Jean Helen Kirkland of Plaquemine in Iberville Parish were born. A pilot at the age of twenty-four, Dozier commanded aircraft in the military transport service and flew missions to South Korea, Japan, Hawaii, Southeast Asia, and the Bering Strait. From 1965 until at least 1980, he was a member of the Air Force Reserve.

After his military service, Dozier graduated from the Paul M. Hebert Law Center at Louisiana State University in Baton Rouge. He taught in the Reserve Officers Training Corps program while earning his Juris Doctor degree at night.

== Political career ==
As a youth, Dozier was a page and then legislative assistant for his grandfather, State Senator Gilbert Hennigan. In 1971–1972, he was the campaign manager for U.S. Senator Allen J. Ellender of Louisiana. Ellender died in the summer of 1972 while campaigning for a seventh term; Democrat J. Bennett Johnston, Jr., then of Shreveport was elected to succeed Ellender in the 1972 general election. In 1974, Dozier ran unsuccessfully for the Louisiana Public Service Commission.

In 1965, Dozier established a law office in Baton Rouge. On November 1, 1975, he was elected agriculture commissioner in the first nonpartisan blanket primary ever held in Louisiana. He led the balloting with 42 percent of the vote. Long-term incumbent Democrat Dave L. Pearce trailed with 30 percent and decided not to pursue a general election (commonly called the runoff in Louisiana) contest with Dozier, who therefore won the position outright. A third candidate was the outgoing State Representative Lantz Womack of Winnsboro in Franklin Parish, who like Pearce had roots in West Carroll Parish in northeastern Louisiana.

Though Dozier had planned to run for governor in the 1979 nonpartisan blanket primary in which no incumbent was listed on the ballot, his ensuing legal problems and unsavory headlines made such a race highly speculative. In 1976, he had given an emergency appointment to the radio broadcaster and campaign consultant, R. T. "Dan" Hanchey, with the idea that Hanchey would manage the gubernatorial campaign. Hanchey, whose broadcasting career included stints in Mobile, Alabama, and New Orleans, recalls that he left the post when Dozier's legal troubles began to surmount.

Dozier instead ran for reelection as agriculture commissioner in the primary held on October 27, 1979. Agribusinessman and fellow Democrat Bob Odom of Zachary in East Baton Rouge Parish, who had worked in three positions under Pearce and was thereafter fired from the department by Dozier, defeated both Dozier and Pearce, who made his last comeback attempt for the office which he had held from 1952 to 1956 and again from 1960 to 1976. Leland George Rawls (born August 9, 1950), a young farmer from Bastrop in Morehouse Parish and then a member of the Louisiana Republican State Central Committee, also ran in the 1979 primary. Rawls carried a hoe during the campaign as a reminder of his promise to "promote, protect, and advance the Agriculture Department." Rawls finished far behind the three leading Democrats. Odom prevailed with 563,515 votes (45.9 percent) to Dozier's 382,486 (31.1 percent). Pearce polled 163,873 (13.4 percent), Rawls 67,021 (5.5 percent), and 50,045 votes (4 percent) were cast for still another Democrat, Joe Coco.

In the general election held on December 8, 1979, Odom handily unseated Dozier, 853,578 (67.2 percent) to 415,714 (32.8 percent). The general election drew some 43,000 more voters in the agriculture commissioner's race than had participated in the first round of balloting. Dozier's percent hardly changed from the primary to the general election.

== Legal troubles ==
The month after his defeat for reelection, Dozier was formally charged in a five-count indictment with violations of both the Hobbs and the Racketeer Influenced and Corrupt Organizations acts. On September 23, 1980, the United States District Court for the Middle District of Louisiana convicted Dozier of extortion and racketeering. The sentence of ten years imprisonment and a $25,000 fine was suspended pending appeal, and Dozier remained free on bail. Among specific instances of extortion cited: Dozier sought $25,000 in 1977 from Nicholas Fakouri and the Vermillion Dairymen's Cooperative Association in Abbeville in Vermilion Parish in return for a loan guarantee from the Louisiana State Market Commission. He also attempted to extort $20,000 in 1976 from the Louisiana Computer Company in return for favorable treatment from the state. In all the incidents specifically cited, Dozier maintained that "his various solicitations were nothing more than the ordinary fundraising activities of a public official faced with the financial burdens of electioneering."

While on bond, Dozier was arrested in a jury tampering scheme after he asked Huey P. Martin, who then solicited the assistance of George Davis, to contact the petit jurors to declare in letters to the court that deliberations in Dozier's trial had been improper. For their compensation, Martin and Davis were to split $50,000 for each of five years. Dozier was also found to have attempted to hire a (1) burglar to break into the office of a business competitor and (2) a hitman for an unknown target. District Judge Frank Joseph Polozola, a recent appointee of U.S. President Jimmy Carter, hence added another eight years to the sentence though there was no indictment or additional trial proceedings.

Dozier had faced a potential eighty years in prison and fines of up to $55,000 when he was found guilty on four of five counts against him: one for racketeering and three for extortion. He was convicted of taking bribes of at least $10,000 and attempting to extort $267,000 from persons doing business with the state agriculture department, such as dairy processors. Prosecutors asserted that Dozier had turned his department into a "cash register" to bilk campaign donations from those having business with the state.

The United States Court of Appeals for the Fifth Circuit in New Orleans upheld Dozier's conviction. The court said that Dozier had used his office illegally when he set a price to assist someone who had a problem with a state agency or a contract issue.

On June 24, 1982, the district court revoked Dozier's probation and imposed a prison term of eight additional years on one of the counts in the original indictment. The eight years was to have been served consecutively with the two other five-year prison terms. The court ordered Dozier to serve a minimum of eighteen months of the eight years before he could be eligible for parole. Dozier was ordered to be placed on five years' probation once released from prison.

== Early prison release ==
In June 1984, President Reagan commuted Dozier's sentence. Dozier had already served time from June 1982 to July 1984, in the Federal Corrections Institution in Fort Worth, Texas. According to the U.S. Bureau of Prisons, Dozier was released April 25, 1986. It was reported that Reagan shortened Dozier's term to 6 years.

Reagan did not release his files in the Dozier case, but it was learned that Mayor Ernest Morial of New Orleans, a fellow Democrat, submitted a character reference for the former agriculture commissioner. The commutation was one of ten issued by Reagan, who said that Dozier's original sentence was excessive compared to what other political figures in similar circumstances had been receiving. When he was agriculture commissioner in 1977, Dozier had criticized President Carter, whom he had supported in 1976, for creating unnecessary problems for Louisiana farmers when Carter approved restrictions on state natural gas sales. Dozier told a civic gathering in Minden that he believed problems in the Carter administration could lead, as it developed, to the election of a Republican as governor of Louisiana in 1979. The Carter-Reagan presidential election came after Dozier had left office and was free on bond.

After Reagan's decision, Dozier faced a parole hearing in the United States Justice Department. In the hearing, Dozier's attorneys described their client as a "Darth Vader", who turned from a "crusading reformer to a man obsessed by the dark side within a year of taking office, an attitude fueled by an overwhelming desire to run for governor." Camille Gravel of Alexandria, one of Dozier's attorneys, described him, accordingly:

He was too aggressive and too self-centered in his ambition. To violate the law was not Dozier's remotest interest; yet his overbearing and arrogant manner did in fact create a certain impression in the minds of others. ...

Judge Polozola opposed the commutation and resisted any change to the 18-year sentence, but President Reagan made the ultimate decision for Dozier's release on parole. U.S. Representative Henson Moore of Louisiana's 6th congressional district, a Republican first elected in 1975 and his party's unsuccessful nominee for the United States Senate in 1986, questioned Reagan's decision not to release the commutation file in the Dozier case.

== Legacy ==
It was later disclosed that Dozier presented checks written to "cash" to Governor Edwin Edwards. The money was deposited into the account of Candy Edwards, the second of the governor's three living wives. According to Edwards, Dozier paid him by check several times for gambling debts incurred from poker games on Thursday evenings at the governor's mansion. One of the checks was for $23,200.

Dozier developed a friendship with Billy Cannon, a dentist and the 1959 Heisman Trophy winner who played for the Louisiana State University Tigers and the American Football League but became involved in counterfeiting. The author Jack Fiser said that Cannon "seemed to associate with people who had a peculiarly low ethical threshold. ..."

After his release from prison in 1986, Dozier spent time in a half-way house in Albuquerque, New Mexico, and then returned to Baton Rouge. He has also lived in St. Francisville in West Feliciana Parish. He was the manager and registered agent of Colt Environmental Services, L.L.C. in Louisiana, city not given.

In 1986, Dozier petitioned for a pardon of his crimes to gain readmittance to the Louisiana bar, for he had lost his right to practice law with the federal convictions. He worked in the real estate office of his brother Kenneth when first released. He did receive the pardon and practiced law at 13698 Oakley Lane in St. Francisville, north of Baton Rouge.

Since 1965, Dozier engaged in real estate development, farming, and cattle ranching while also practicing law. In his later life, he maintained a cattle ranch in St. Francisville. He commercially farmed thousands of acres over a period of three decades, including the Meade Plantation in Rapides Parish and Little River Farms in Avoyelles Parish. He left St. Francisville in 2011 and returned to Baton Rouge.

Based on campaign contributions, Gilbert H. Dozier is also a Democrat.

Dozier's predecessor, Dave Pearce, was in his seventies when he too was tried on similar charges of abusing the office of agriculture commissioner, but Pearce served no time in prison because of his age, ill health, and the decision of then East Baton Rouge Parish District Attorney Ossie Brown to drop the felony counts against Pearce. Dozier's successor, Bob Odom, faced eleven charges of theft, bribery and extortion in his management of the agriculture department, but he was acquitted in a trial held in 2002.

Other Louisiana figures who faced serious legal troubles, including prison time, during this period in state history included Governor Edwards (as well as his son Stephen), Attorney General Jack P.F. Gremillion, three state insurance commissioners, Sherman A. Bernard, Douglas D. "Doug" Green, and James H. "Jim" Brown, Louisiana State Senate President Michael H. O'Keefe of New Orleans, Elections Commissioner Jerry Fowler, Commissioner of Administration Charles E. Roemer II (father of U.S. Representative and Governor Buddy Roemer), and U.S. Representative William J. Jefferson of Louisiana's 2nd congressional district.

Dozier died at the age of seventy-nine in September 2013 at Our Lady of the Lake Regional Medical Center in Baton Rouge. His death came 33 years to the day of his initial sentencing. Survivors included his long-term companion, Treva Lea Tidwell (born 1962) of St. Francisville and Baton Rouge; five children from the 1955 marriage to the former Jean Helen Kirkland (born 1935) of Laurel Park, North Carolina: Susan Laborde and husband Robert, Denise Dupre and husband Greg, Leslie Lynelle Dozier, Carrie Johns, and Gilbert H. Dozier and wife Kelly. Other survivors include his brother, Kenneth Rufus Dozier. A memorial service was held on September 28 at Rabenhorst Funeral Home, 825 Government Street, in Baton Rouge. Interment followed at Newlin Cemetery in Singer in Beauregard Parish.

Political offices
Preceded by Dave L. Pearce	Louisiana Commissioner of Agriculture and Forestry; 1976–1980	Succeeded by Bob Odom
