= 2007 Louisiana elections =

Louisiana's 2007 state elections were held on October 20, 2007, with runoff elections held on November 17. All statewide elected offices were up, as well as all seats in the Louisiana State Legislature.

Republicans were successful in electing the country's first Indian-American governor, Congressman Bobby Jindal. The issue of the state's response to Hurricane Katrina played a large part in the decision of incumbent governor Kathleen Blanco to retire rather than seek a second term in office. Term limits also effected many retirements in the state legislature, which proved to be a benefit to Republicans, who made gains in both houses.

== Governor ==
Bobby Jindal avoided a runoff by getting a majority in the Jungle Primary with 54%, over a number of other contenders.

== Lieutenant governor ==
2007 Louisiana lieutenant gubernatorial election
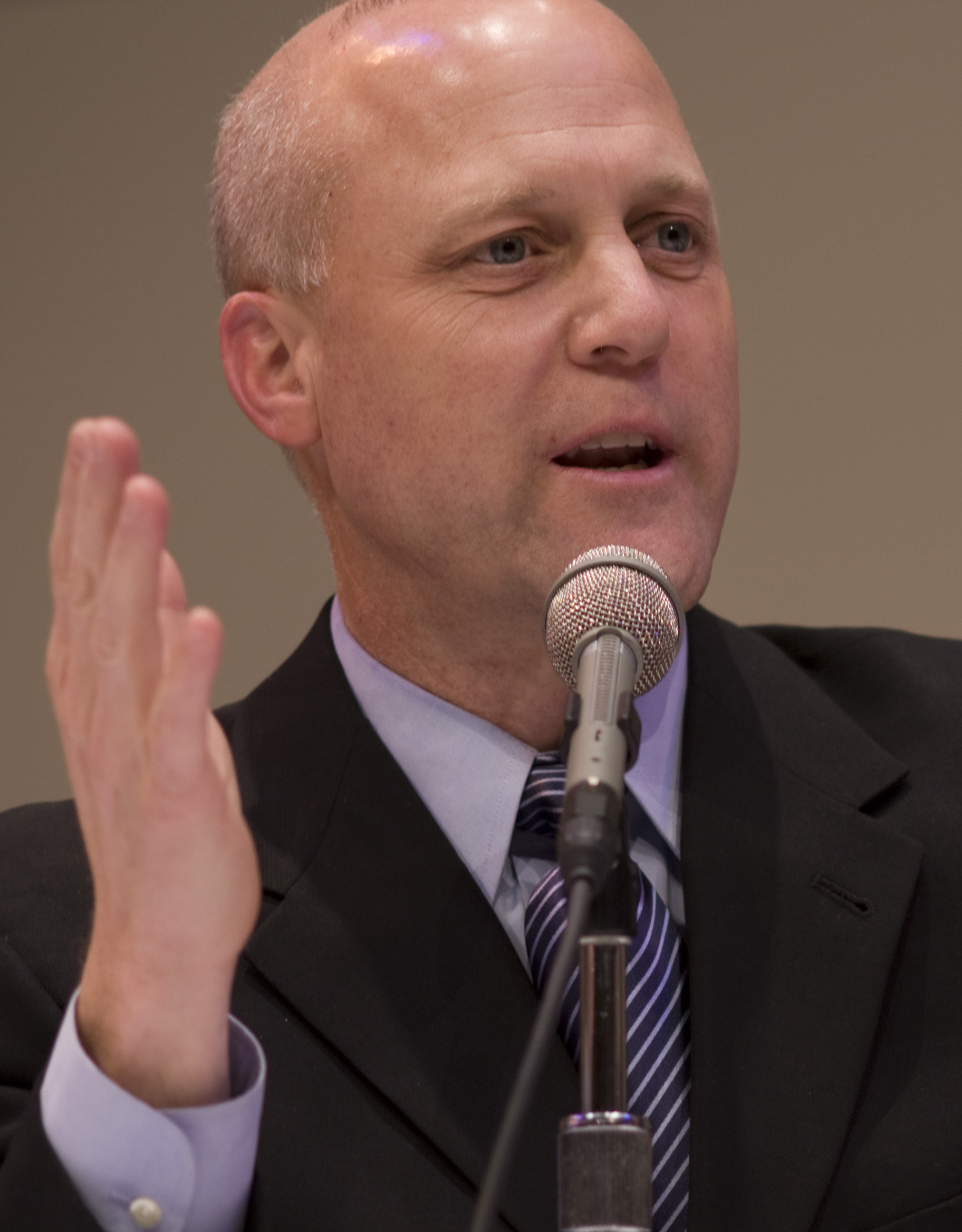

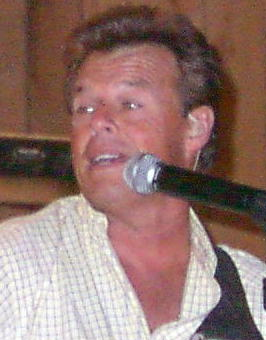

| Nominee | Mitch Landrieu | Sammy Kershaw | Gary Beard |
| Party | Democratic | Republican | Republican |
| Popular vote | 701,887 | 375,727 | 130,876 |
| Percentage | 56.6% | 30.3% | 10.6% |
- Parish results Landrieu: 40–50% 50–60% 60–70% 70–80% 80–90% Kershaw: 40–50% 50–60% 60–70%
Lieutenant Governor before election
Mitch Landrieu
Democratic
Elected Lieutenant Governor
Mitch Landrieu
Democratic

Democratic incumbent Mitch Landrieu had the best showing of any Democrat running statewide, winning 56.6% of the vote. He was opposed by two Republicans, country musician Sammy Kershaw and State Representative Gary Beard, and by two Independents, Norris "Spanky" Gros Jr. and Thomas D. Kates.

=== Open Primary Results ===
2007 Louisiana Lieutenant Governor election
| Party | Candidate | Votes | % |
|---|---|---|---|
| Democratic | Mitch Landrieu (incumbent) | 701,887 | 56.6 |
| Republican | Sammy Kershaw | 375,727 | 30.3 |
| Republican | Gary Beard | 130,876 | 10.6 |
| Independent | Norris "Spanky" Gros Jr. | 15,965 | 1.3 |
| Independent | Thomas D. Kates | 15,555 | 1.2 |
| Turnout | | 1,240,010 | |

== Attorney general ==
Incumbent Attorney General Charles Foti was challenged by both a Democrat, James "Buddy" Caldwell, and a Republican, Royal Alexander. Foti placed third in the open primary, leading to a runoff between Caldwell and Alexander, in which Caldwell easily won.

== Commissioner of Agriculture and Forestry ==
2007 Louisiana Commissioner of Agriculture and Forestry election
| Nominee | Mike Strain (Note: Since Strain's opponent Bob Odom withdrew from the runoff, no runoff was held and Strain was made the winner by default.) | Bob Odom |
| Party | Republican | Democratic |
| Popular vote | 494,760 | 505,504 |
| Percentage | 40.5% | 41.3% |
| Nominee | Wayne Carter | Don Johnson |
| Party | Republican | Republican |
| Popular vote | 152,893 | 69,470 |
| Percentage | 12.5% | 5.7% |
- Parish results Strain: 30–40% 40–50% 60–70% Odom: 40–50% 50–60% 60–70%
Commissioner of Agriculture and Forestry before election
Bob Odom
Democratic
Elected Commissioner of Agriculture and Forestry
Mike Strain
Republican

Longtime incumbent Democrat Bob Odom faced his toughest re-election campaign ever, winning only 41% of the vote and ending up into a runoff with Republican State Representative Michael G. Strain. Odom withdrew from the runoff, making Strain the winner by default.

=== Open Primary Results ===
2007 Louisiana Commissioner of Agriculture and Forestry election
| Party | Candidate | Votes | % |
|---|---|---|---|
| Democratic | Bob Odom (incumbent) | 505,504 | 41.3 |
| Republican | Mike Strain | 494,760 | 40.5 |
| Republican | Wayne Carter | 152,893 | 12.5 |
| Republican | Don Johnson | 69,470 | 5.7 |
| Turnout | | 1,222,627 | |

== Commissioner of Insurance ==
2007 Louisiana Insurance Commissioner election
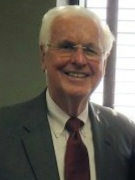

| Nominee | Jim Donelon | Jim Crowley | Robert Lansden |
| Party | Republican | Democratic | Republican |
| Popular vote | 606,196 | 423,986 | 105,991 |
| Percentage | 50.9% | 35.6% | 8.9% |
- Parish results Donelon: 40–50% 50–60% 60–70% Crowley: 40–50% 50–60%
Insurance Commissioner before election
Jim Donelon
Republican
Elected Insurance Commissioner
Jim Donelon
Republican

Republican Jim Donelon, who was elected to the Insurance Commissioner post in a 2006 special election, defeated both Democrat Jim Crowley and Republicans Robert Lansden and Jerilyn Schneider-Kneale to win a full term.

=== Open Primary Results ===
2007 Louisiana Commissioner of Insurance election
| Party | Candidate | Votes | % |
|---|---|---|---|
| Republican | Jim Donelon (incumbent) | 606,196 | 50.9 |
| Democratic | Jim Crowley | 423,986 | 35.6 |
| Republican | Robert Lansden | 105,991 | 8.9 |
| Republican | Jerilyn Schneider-Kneale | 55,350 | 4.6 |
| Turnout | | 1,191,523 | |

== Secretary of State ==
2007 Louisiana Secretary of State election
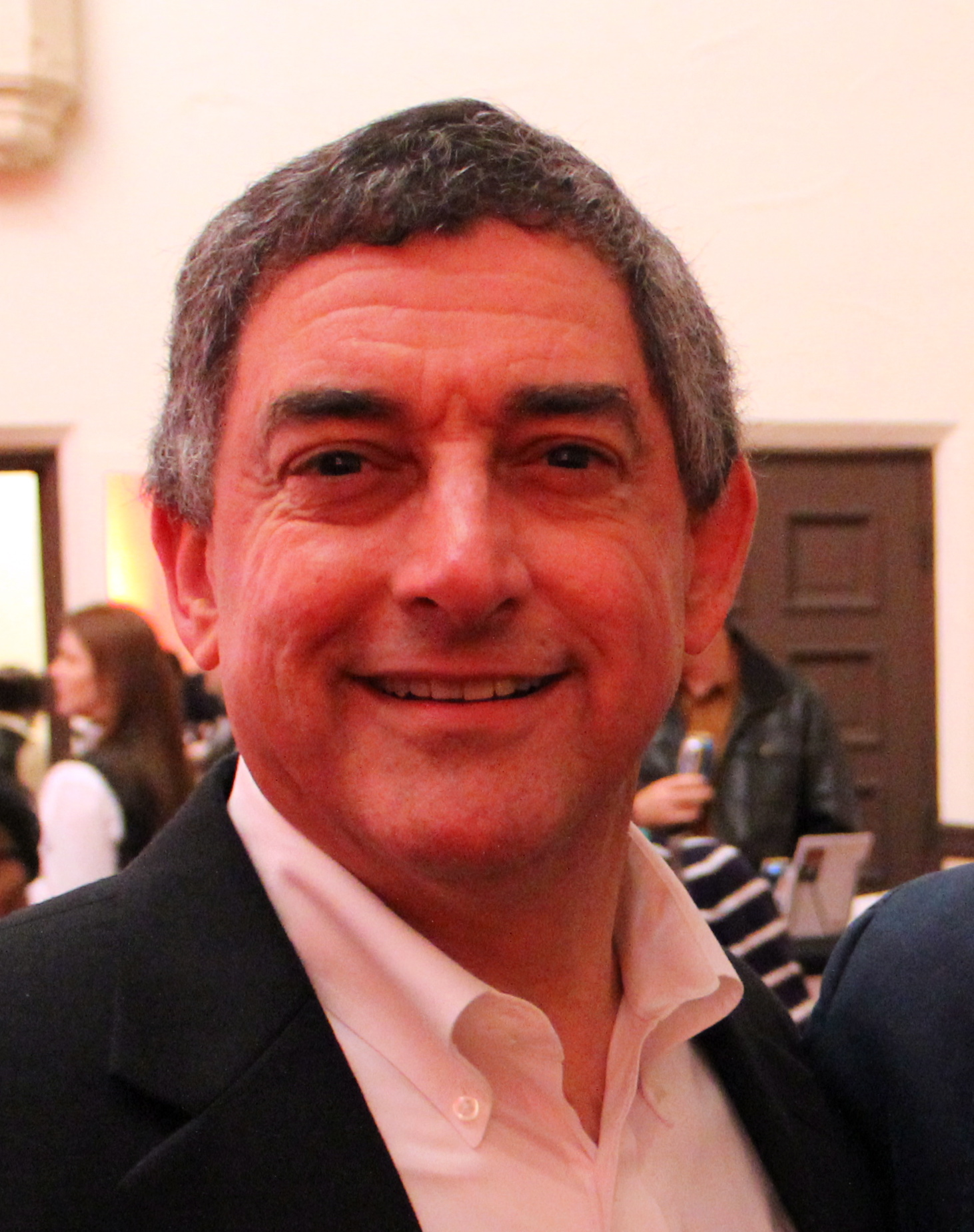

| Nominee | Jay Dardenne | R. Wooley | Scott A. Lewis III |
| Party | Republican | Democratic | Libertarian |
| Popular vote | 757,821 | 374,199 | 64,723 |
| Percentage | 63.3% | 31.3% | 5.4% |
- Parish results Dardenne: 40–50% 50–60% 60–70% 70–80% Wooley: 40–50% 50–60%
Secretary of State before election
Jay Dardenne
Republican
Elected Secretary of State
Jay Dardenne
Republican

Republican incumbent Jay Dardenne, after winning a special election in 2006, easily defeated Democrat R. Wooley and Libertarian Scott A. Lewis III to win a full term.

=== Open Primary Results ===
2007 Louisiana Secretary of State election
| Party | Candidate | Votes | % |
|---|---|---|---|
| Republican | Jay Dardenne (incumbent) | 757,821 | 63.3 |
| Democratic | R. Wooley | 374,199 | 31.3 |
| Libertarian | Scott A. Lewis III | 64,723 | 5.4 |
| Turnout | | 1,196,743 | |

== State Treasurer ==
Results by parish Kennedy: 90–100%

Incumbent John Neely Kennedy, a Democrat who switched to the Republican party in 2007, was re-elected unopposed.

== State legislature ==
=== Louisiana Senate ===
In the open primary election, Democrats won a total of 22 seats, including both seats won outright and runoffs between two Democrats. Republicans won 12 seats outright with one runoff. In the runoff elections between a Democrat and a Republican, each party won two seats, making the post-election composition of the Senate 24 Democrats and 15 Republicans. Following the elections, Democratic State Sen. Robert Adley switched to the Republican party, making the Senate 23 Democrats and 16 Republicans.

=== House of Representatives ===
In the open primary, Democrats won a guaranteed 45 seats: 34 outright, with 11 runoffs between two Democrats. Republicans won a guaranteed 42 seats: 30 outright, with 12 runoffs between two Republicans. One independent was also elected. The remaining 17 seats went to runoffs, including 16 between a Democrat and a Republican and one between a Democrat and an Independent. Democrats and Republicans each won eight of these seats, with the last going to an Independent, giving the Democrats a slim 53 to 50, with two Independents, majority in the House of Representatives.
