= Harry Wilson (politician) =

American politician

Harry D. Wilson

Louisiana Commissioner of Agriculture and Forestry
- In office 1916 – January 7, 1948
- Governor: Ruffin G. Pleasant; John M. Parker; Henry L. Fuqua; Oramel H. Simpson; Huey Long; Alvin Olin King; Oscar K. Allen; James A. Noe; Richard W. Leche; Earl Long; Sam H. Jones; Jimmie Davis
- Succeeded by: Millard Perkins (interim); W. E. Anderson

Personal details
- Born: May 5, 1869 Independence; Tangipahoa Parish; Louisiana, US
- Died: January 7, 1948 (aged 78) Amite, Tangipahoa Parish
- Resting place: Amite Cemetery
- Party: Democratic
- Spouse: Olivette Mintern Toadvin Wilson
- Relations: Bolivar Edwards Kemp, Jr. (son-in-law)
- Children: William Edward Wilson Mennette Estelle Wilson Kemp; John Glen Wilson; Olivette Martha Wilson Garrison; Wilbur Wilson; Justin E. Wilson Helen Eloise Wilson Heidelberg
- Occupation: Farmer; Politician

Harry D. Wilson (May 5, 1869 – January 7, 1948) was a Democratic politician from Tangipahoa Parish, one of the Florida Parishes of southeastern Louisiana, who served from 1916 until his death as the Louisiana Commissioner of Agriculture and Forestry. He was the father of the humorist and chef Justin E. Wilson.

== Background ==
Of Welsh descent, Wilson was a son of Dr. and Mrs. William D. Wilson. In 1856, Dr. Wilson had built a store in Independence, Louisiana, which remained for years the oldest building in the community. Harry Wilson worked in the parish seat of Amite in the general store of the merchant Jacob Stern at a time when Tangipahoa Parish did not yet depend on the strawberry crop. During the 1890s, Wilson was an express messenger for the Illinois Central Railroad. He left that position to pursue a political career.

== Political career ==
Affectionately known by voters as "Uncle Harry" or "Mister Harry", Wilson served two nonconsecutive terms in the Louisiana House of Representatives from 1900 to 1904 and again from 1908 to 1912.

Representative Wilson led the move to establish Independence, located five miles south of Amite, as a town. In 1902 and 1903, he corresponded with Governor William Wright Heard regarding incorporation of the community, which at the time had a population of 308. Governor Heard informed Wilson that he considered the three square miles proposed for the new town too much land for a small village and suggested that the tract be reduced. Originally named "Uncle Sam", Independence had begun in 1852 when the New Orleans, Jackson and Great Northern Railroad began operating through the area. Independence was finally proclaimed a town on August 22, 1912.

When Ruffin Pleasant of Shreveport was elected governor in 1916, voters also chose Wilson as agriculture commissioner, a position to which he was reelected to seven times. Under Wilson, the agriculture department established the Market Bulletin, a newspaper that allowed landowners and farmers a means by which to purchase and sell agriculture-related goods and services. Wilson developed the department's seed laboratory and increased the emphasis on entomology. Later, a full-time entomologist, Sidney McCrory of Ascension Parish, was hired; McCrory was elected for a single four-year term as agriculture commissioner in 1956. Wilson established an agricultural museum in the basement of the Louisiana State Capitol in Baton Rouge. For twenty-two years Wilson was the chairman of the Southern Commissioners of Agriculture Association. Wilson was an organizer of the Cotton Consumption Council and a president of the interest group with an unusual name, the Association for the Increased Use of Cotton.

On June 19, 1933, U.S. Representative Bolivar Edwards Kemp, Sr., of Louisiana's 6th congressional district, died unexpectedly of a heart attack at his home in Amite. His seat ordinarily would have been filled through a special primary and general election. Governor Oscar K. Allen waited until December 1933 to declare that a special election would be held eight days from the date of his announcement. Allen named Kemp's widow, the former Esther Edwards Conner, known as "Lallie" Kemp, as the "unopposed" Democratic nominee. Many protested Allen's announcement, and ballots were destroyed or burned in several locations within the district. After state election officials nevertheless declared Lallie Kemp the winner of the special election, a committee of citizens staged a "revolt election", won by Jared Y. Sanders, Jr., of Baton Rouge, the son of former Governor Jared Y. Sanders, Sr., and supported by district conservatives and anti-Long elements. In January 1934, Mrs. Kemp and Sanders presented their competing claims to the U. S. House. The United States House Committee on Elections refused to seat either candidate, and the full House concurred by voice vote. Lallie Kemp declined to run in the subsequent May 1, 1934, special election. It is unclear why Governor Allen waited so long to call the first special election, which led to even greater delay became of the controversy over the guidelines for the election. In the special election, Sanders defeated Kemp's replacement candidate, Agriculture Commissioner Harry Wilson.

In the 1940 state elections, Wilson won while running on the Earl Kemp Long ticket. He defeated Charles O'Brien, the candidate supported by Sam H. Jones, who unseated Long in the gubernatorial runoff contest that year.

Lallie Kemp, who died in 1943, was appointed in 1937 by Governor Richard Leche to the Louisiana Hospital Board. She is honored by the naming of the medical center, a critical access hospital, in Independence.

== Legacy ==
Wilson took much comfort in his roots in his hometown of Independence. On his death bed in the Our Lady of the Lake Hospital in Baton Rouge, he regained consciousness after a week in a coma and told his nurse, "Turn me toward Tangipahoa..." A genealogical website indicates that Wilson did not die in Baton Rouge but in Amite; if so, he must have been released from the hospital and sent home for his final few days. Wilson was succeeded in the office on an interim basis by his long-term assistant, Millard Perkins, who did not seek the position in the 1948 election instead won by W. E. Anderson, also of Tangipahoa Parish. Anderson died in office in 1952 before he could begin his second elected term. Anderson was succeeded by Dave L. Pearce of Oak Grove in West Carroll Parish, originally appointed to the vacancy by Governor Earl Long.

Justin Wilson, the best known of the Wilson children, was the second youngest of four daughters and three sons of Harry Wilson and his wife, the former Olivette Mintern Toadvin (1880-1976), who was of French descent and known as Olivet Wilson. Justin was born in Roseland near Amite. Justin's older sister, Minette Wilson Kemp, was the wife of Bolivar Edwards Kemp, Jr., the state attorney general from 1948 to 1952.

It was his mother, an expert in the improvisation of meals, who taught Justin how to cook. Olivet Wilson was also a composer and pianist of instrumental music who was still performing on occasion into her nineties.

Harry Wilson is interred at Amite Cemetery. alongside his wife. Justin Wilson is interred at the Saint William Catholic Cemetery in Port Vincent in Livingston Parish.

Preceded by Charles D. Abels	Louisiana State Representative from Tangipahoa Parish; 1900 –1904	Succeeded by Charles D. Abels
Preceded by Charles D. Abels	Louisiana State Representative from Tangipahoa Parish; 1908–1912	Succeeded by Herman P. McClendon
Preceded by Missing	Louisiana Commissioner of Agriculture and Forestry; 1916–1948	Succeeded by Millard Perkins (interim)
