= Sherman A. Bernard =

American politician in Louisiana (1925–2012)

Sherman Albert Bernard Sr.
- Bernard in his later years

Louisiana Insurance Commissioner
- In office 1972–1988
- Governor: Edwin Edwards; Dave Treen
- Preceded by: Dudley A. Guglielmo
- Succeeded by: Douglas D. "Doug" Green

Personal details
- Born: June 10, 1925 Schriever, Louisiana, US
- Died: May 11, 2012 (aged 86) Marrero, Louisiana, US
- Resting place: Garden of Memories in Marrero
- Party: Democratic
- Spouse: Julia Speranza Bernard (deceased)
- Children: 6
- Occupation: Businessman

Military service
- Allegiance: United States
- Branch/service: United States Marine Corps
- Battles/wars: World War II

Sherman Albert Bernard Sr. (June 10, 1925 – May 11, 2012) was an American businessman from Jefferson Parish in the New Orleans suburbs, who served from 1972 to 1988 as the Louisiana Commissioner of Insurance. He is mainly remembered for having served twenty-six months in federal prison after he pleaded guilty to extortion in federal court in connection with his job duties.

== Background ==
Bernard was born in Schriever in Terrebonne Parish in south Louisiana, and graduated from Terrebonne High School in Houma in Terrebonne Parish. He served in the United States Marine Corps during World War II. Early in his career he was an officer of the Louisiana State Police. At the time he entered the race for state insurance commissioner, Bernard was in the house moving, trucking, and construction business in Westwego on the West Bank of the Mississippi River in Jefferson Parish.

== State politics ==
In 1968, Bernard was elected to the Louisiana Democratic State Central Committee. In December 1971, he upset Insurance Commissioner Dudley A. Guglielmo of Baton Rouge in the Democratic runoff election. On February 1, 1972, he defeated the Republican nominee, W. G. "Billy" Haynes of West Monroe in northeastern Louisiana. Bernard polled 723,681 votes (73.2 percent) to Haynes' 265,056 (26.8 percent). Bernard won sixty-three parishes, having lost only in Haynes' Ouachita Parish, where he still polled 49.5 percent of the vote. In that same election, the Democrat Edwin Edwards, then of Crowley in Acadia Parish, defeated Republican gubernatorial nominee David C. Treen, then of Jefferson Parish

In 1974, Bernard challenged U.S. Senator Russell B. Long in the Democratic primary but received little support. Long was so popular that year that state Republican chairman James H. Boyce of Baton Rouge complained of being unable to find a candidate to oppose him. Bernard was nevertheless reelected as insurance commissioner the next year in 1975 in the first election ever held in Louisiana under the nonpartisan blanket primary system. He handily defeated the former Mayor Victor H. Schiro of New Orleans, an insurance agent by occupation. In 1979, Bernard turned aside a strong challenge for reelection from State Senator Don W. Williamson of Caddo Parish, then a Democrat. A third candidate was the Republican W. L. "Bud" Gaiennie, an insurance agent from Theriot in Bernard's native Terrebonne Parish. Previously a party activist in Williamson's Caddo Parish, Gaiennie called himself a "very strict constitutional conservative" and claimed that insurance rates could be lowered by replacing the oversight of the insurance commissioner. Gaiennie drew only 72,266 votes in the primary. In the runoff, Bernard narrowly defeated Williamson, who had the support of the popular Public Broadcasting Service chef and humorist Justin Wilson. Bernard polled 627,247 votes (50.3 percent) to Williamson's 618,952 (49.7 percent).

In 1983, Bernard was forced for his final term as insurance commissioner into a general election, popularly called the runoff in Louisiana, with the Republican candidate, Dave Brennan, an insurance executive. In the primary, Bernard led with 652,060 votes (46.7 percent); Brennan trailed with 362,147 (26 percent). Bernard won his fourth and final term as commissioner in the general election, having polled 553,230 votes (54.9 percent) to Brennan's 453,793 (46.1 percent). Turnout dipped sharply in the second race because there was no gubernatorial contest at the top of the ticket, as Edwin Edwards had unseated David Treen in the primary.

In the September 27, 1986, primary for the U.S. Senate seat finally vacated by Russell Long, Bernard finished in fourth place with 52,075 votes (4.4 percent), three more than the fifth-place candidate, fellow Democrat J. E. Jumonville, Jr. Victory for the seat ultimately went to another Democrat, U.S. Representative John Breaux of Crowley of Louisiana's 7th congressional district, who defeated the Republican choice, U.S. Representative Henson Moore of Baton Rouge of Louisiana's 6th congressional district.

Bernard was ousted from office in the 1987 nonpartisan blanket primary by fellow Democrat Douglas D. "Doug" Green of Baton Rouge, 773,026 (55.3 percent) to 456,539 (32.6 percent).

Although Green had run on a platform to clean up irregularities in the department – he even called himself "Mr. Clean" – Green was subsequently implicated in the Champion insurance scandal and was sentenced to twenty-five years in prison, a far longer period than Bernard would later serve. Champion was found to have made more than $2 million in campaign contributions to Green in exchange for regulatory favors.

== Arrest and trial ==
Bernard was the first of three successive insurance commissioners to be convicted and serve time in federal prison for unrelated crimes (preceding Doug Green and James H. "Jim" Brown). He confessed in 1993 to having extorted $80,000 during the 1980s; the money was disguised as campaign contributions from insurance companies in return for obtaining operating licenses in Louisiana. State Representative Harry Hollins of Calcasieu Parish led a legislative committee in 1978 which began investigating Bernard.

He pleaded guilty to one count of extortion and was later sentenced to twenty-six months in federal prison which he served at FPC Montgomery in Montgomery, Alabama.

Bernard recalled that he had a view of the Alabama State Capitol from the prison bus that took him daily to his job changing light bulbs and sweeping a large auditorium. He was released on September 20, 1996.

== Comeback ==
In 1991, Bernard tried to return to the insurance commissioner's office, but he finished the primary with just under 19 percent of the vote.

Victory instead went to James H. "Jim" Brown, the former Louisiana Secretary of State who was earlier a state senator from Ferriday in Concordia Parish in eastern Louisiana. Green did not seek reelection in 1991. After his reelection to a third term in 1999, Brown was forced in 2003 to resign the office and was sentenced to six months in the Federal Correctional Institution in Oakdale, Louisiana, for lying to an agent of the Federal Bureau of Investigation, a charge that Brown repeatedly repudiated in his book Justice Denied but one which ruined his political career. The Oakdale facility is where former governor Edwin Edwards spent the latter portion of his own prison sentence for racketeering.

== Death ==
The Roman Catholic Bernard died in his sleep at the age of eighty-six at his home in Marrero, also in Jefferson Parish. Bernard and his wife, the late Julia Speranza Bernard, had six children: Sherman Bernard, Jr., and wife, Denise, Dale Bernard, the late Dennis Bernard, Linda Bernard Zimmerman and husband, Harry, Deana Benard, and Victor Bernard and wife, Scarlet. Bernard is interred at Garden of Memories in Marrero.

Party political offices
Preceded by Dudley A. Guglielmo	Democratic nominee for Louisiana Insurance Commissioner; 1972, 1983	Vacant Title next held by Jim Brown
Preceded by Dudley A. Guglielmo	Louisiana Commissioner of Insurance; 1972–1988	Succeeded by Douglas D. "Doug" Green
