= E. Susan Kellogg =

Maryland Insurance Commissioner
- In office July 11, 1988 – August 1, 1989
- Governor: William Donald Schaefer
- Preceded by: Edward J. Muhl
- Succeeded by: John A. Donaho

Personal details
- Born: July 11, 1945 (age 81) Cincinnati, Ohio, U.S.
- Spouse: Walter Frankhauser
- Education: University of Cincinnati; Syracuse University; Loyola University Maryland; Union Institute & University

E. Susan Kellogg (born July 11, 1945) is an American educator. After serving as a university administrator and as a director at MetLife, she was appointed Maryland's insurance commissioner in June 1988, taking office the following month. She left after ten months, under pressure from state lawmakers and consumer advocates about rising car insurance rates. She served as an adjunct professor of business at Virginia Military Institute, where she has faced claims of racial insensitivity.
