= Gilbert Franklin Hennigan =

American politician

Louisiana State Senator for Allen, Beauregard, Calcasieu, Cameron, and Jefferson Davis parishes
- In office 1944–1956
- Preceded by: Ernest S. Clements; James O. Dolby
- Succeeded by: Guy Sockrider; Arsene Stewart

Personal details
- Born: December 18, 1883 Meadows, Calcasieu Parish, Louisiana, US
- Died: November 4, 1960 (aged 76) Windham Creek, Calcasieu Parish, Louisiana, US
- Resting place: Cannon Cemetery in Beauregard Parish
- Party: Democratic
- Spouse: Myrtie Mae Whitman Hennigan (married 1906-1927, her death)
- Relations: Gil Dozier (grandson)
- Children: 8
- Occupation: Rancher

Gilbert Franklin Hennigan (December 18, 1883 – November 4, 1960) was a three-term Democratic member of the Louisiana State Senate, who served from 1944 to 1956 under Governors Jimmie Davis, Earl Kemp Long, and Robert F. Kennon.

== Background ==
Hennigan was born in rural Meadows in Calcasieu Parish near Lake Charles in southwestern Louisiana. He was the only son of nine children born to Henry Franklin Hennigan and the former Nancy Elizabeth Eaves. The senior Hennigan was a Baptist minister; Mrs. Hennigan, a school teacher. In 1939, Gilbert Hennigan became one of the incorporators of the Beauregard Electric Cooperative. He served from 1936 until his death as a board member of the First National Bank in DeRidder in Beauregard Parish.

Hennigan and his wife, the former Myrtie Mae Whitman (1888-1927), whom he married at Brushy Creek in Beauregard Parish in 1906, had eight children. She died at the age of thirty-nine with an unsuccessful ninth pregnancy. Hennigan was left to rear five children under the age of fifteen. One of the five died in 1930 at the age of three.

The second of the Hennigan daughters, Sylvia Mae (1910-1977), herself a teacher, married the school principal A. J. Dozier (1907-1997). The Doziers had two sons, one of whom, Gil Dozier, served as the Commissioner of the Louisiana Department of Agriculture and Forestry from 1976 to 1980.

== Career ==
From 1927 to 1929, Gilbert Hennigan was the chief deputy sheriff of Beauregard Parish. From 1932 to 1944, he was a member of the Beauregard Parish School Board; in 1933 he became the board president and held that position until he left the panel. He was elected in 1943 as president of the Louisiana School Board Association. That same year, he was elected to succeed Ernest S. Clements to the first of three terms in the state Senate from Allen, Beauregard, Calcasieu, Cameron, and Jeff Davis parishes. During his tenure, Hennigan was the chairman of the Senate Education Committee. In 1950, he was instrumental in the creation of McNeese State University as a four-year college in Lake Charles. In 1955, Hennigan declined to seek a fourth term and retired to his ranch in Beauregard Parish.

Hennigan died in November 1960 at the age of seventy-seven in Windham Creek in Calcasieu Parish. He is interred at Cannon Cemetery in Beauregard Parish.

Preceded by Ernest S. Clements; James O. Dolby	Louisiana State Senator from Allen, Beauregard, Calcasieu, Cameron, and Jefferson Davis parishes); Gilbert Franklin Hennigan with James O. Dolby and Guy W. Sockrider, Jr. 1944–1956	Succeeded by Guy Sockrider; Arsene Stewart
