= Robert Woolley =

Robert Woolley may refer to:

- Robert W. Woolley (1871–1958), American Democratic politician from Washington D.C
- J. Robert Wooley, Louisiana politician
