= DeRidder High School =

Location
- 723 O'Neal Street; DeRidder, Beauregard Parish, Louisiana 70634; United States; 30°51′24″N 93°18′26″W

Information
- Type: Public
- School district: Beauregard Parish School Board
- NCES School ID: 220018000081
- Principal: Samuel Smith
- Teaching staff: 41.59 (on an FTE basis)
- Grades: 9–12
- Enrollment: 692 (2023-2024)
- Student to teacher ratio: 16.64
- Colors: Royal blue and white
- Mascot: Dragon
- Nickname: Dragons
- Rival: Leesville High School
- Yearbook: The Dragon
- Website: dhs.beau.k12.la.us

DeRidder High School is a public high school in the city of DeRidder, Louisiana, United States. The 9-12 school is a part of the Beauregard Parish School Board.

== School uniforms ==
All students are required to wear school uniforms. These consist of khaki pants, jeans, shorts or skirts with collared polo, plain dress shirt, plain turtlenecks or oxford shirts that are to be solid white, royal blue, navy, or black. School-sponsored tees are also acceptable.

== Athletics ==
DeRidder High athletics compete in the LHSAA.

=== State championships ===
- Baseball: 2003
- Boys' basketball: 1970, 1971
- Girls' basketball: 1974, 1975, 1976, 1984
- Softball: 2018

== Notable alumni ==
- Mel Branch (1955), professional football player for the Dallas Texans (American Football League)
- Deshazor Everett (2010), professional football player for the Washington Redskins
- Michael Mayes (1984), professional football player for the New Orleans Saints and New York Jets
- Tim Temple, Louisiana Insurance Commissioner
