= Dudley A. Guglielmo =

American politician

Louisiana Insurance Commissioner
- In office 1964–1972
- Governor: John McKeithen
- Preceded by: Rufus D. Hayes
- Succeeded by: Sherman A. Bernard

Personal details
- Born: Dudley Anthony Guglielmo; April 21, 1909
- Died: July 30, 2005 (aged 96) Baton Rouge, Louisiana
- Party: Democratic
- Spouse: Widower
- Children: 3
- Occupation: Government employee

Dudley Anthony Guglielmo Sr. (April 21, 1909 – July 30, 2005) was an American politician. He served as Louisiana insurance commissioner from 1964 to 1972.

Party political offices
Preceded by Rufus D. Hayes	Democratic nominee for Louisiana Insurance Commissioner; 1964, 1968	Succeeded by Sherman A. Bernard
Preceded by Rufus D. Hayes	Louisiana Insurance Commissioner; 1964–1972	Succeeded by Sherman A. Bernard
