= J. Robert Wooley =

American lawyer

James Robert Wooley

Louisiana Commissioner of Insurance
- In office October 2000 – February 15, 2006
- Governor: Murphy J. Foster Jr. Kathleen Blanco
- Preceded by: James H. "Jim" Brown
- Succeeded by: Jim Donelon

Personal details
- Born: December 7, 1953 (age 72) Natchitoches, Louisiana, USA
- Party: Democratic
- Spouse: Peggy Cross Wooley
- Children: Derek, Morgan, Cameron, and Savannah Wooley Step-children: Sally Stevens Carlisle, W. Bowman Stevens, Anna Stevens
- Education: University of Louisiana at Monroe; Louisiana State University Law School
- Occupation: Lawyer and Consultant

James Robert Wooley, known as J. Robert Wooley (born December 7, 1953), is an attorney in Baton Rouge, Louisiana, who served as a Democrat as his state's insurance commissioner from 2003 to 2006. He was also the acting insurance commissioner from 2000 to 2003.

== Background ==
Wooley was born in Natchitoches. At the time of his birth, his family was living in Alexandria, where his father was principal of what is now the Louisiana Special Education Center. His parents drove to Natchitoches for Robert's birth, so that he would be born in the same clinic as his older brother.

Wooley attended Ouachita Parish High School in Monroe, where his father headed another educational institution for special-needs children. As the son of an educator, academics were important to Wooley from a young age. After he graduated from high school in 1971, he attended the University of Louisiana at Monroe, from which he received a degree in business administration in 1974. He obtained his Juris Doctor degree in 1977 from the Paul M. Hebert Law Center at Louisiana State University in Baton Rouge, and was admitted to the Bar on October 7, 1977.

Wooley briefly practiced law in Opelousas, but relocated to Vidalia in eastern Louisiana to engage in practice law with then State Senator James H. "Jim" Brown, a Democrat.

== Political career ==
Wooley worked to elect Brown as Louisiana Secretary of State in 1979 in an upset victory over Sandra Thompson of Monroe, a well-known state administrator. Brown succeeded Paul J. Hardy of St. Martin Parish, an unsuccessful gubernatorial candidate later elected in 1987 as lieutenant governor. While Brown served eight years as secretary of state, Wooley ran a consulting firm in Baton Rouge and was an assistant secretary of state. In the latter role in 1986, he worked for legislative passage of the Software License Enforcement Act. Critics, however, said that the measure offered little consumer protection for computer users in Louisiana.

In 1991, Brown was handily elected insurance commissioner after the scandals of the preceding administration of Commissioner Douglas D. "Doug Green. After nine years in the position, Brown was suspended in October 2000 because of federal indictments against him. Cleared of those indictments, Brown still served a six-month sentence at the Federal Correctional Institution in Oakdale, Louisiana, on conviction of having lied to an agent of the Federal Bureau of Investigation regarding an insurance company, a claim that he sought to refute in his book Justice Denied.

Wooley served as Brown's assistant insurance commissioner from 1999 to 2000 and then became the acting commissioner for three years. Wooley won the position himself in the general election held on November 15, 2003. He defeated the Republican candidate, Dan Kyle, the former state legislative auditor. Wooley received 773,578 votes (57.7 percent) to Kyle's 567,034 (42.3 percent). In that same election, the Democrat Kathleen Babineaux Blanco defeated the Republican gubernatorial choice, Bobby Jindal, who rebounded four years later to claim the state's highest constitutional office.

In 2023, Wooley became the secretary of the Louisiana Workforce Commission, appointed by Governor John Bel Edwards.

== Return to private life ==
Wooley resigned as commissioner on February 15, 2006, to take a legal position with the firm Adams and Reese in Baton Rouge, which also employs former Speaker of the Louisiana House of Representatives E. L. "Bubba" Henry. Jim Donelon, a Republican former member of the Louisiana House of Representatives and Wooley's first deputy whom he appointed in 2001, succeeded to the commissioner's post under terms of the Louisiana State Constitution of 1974. Donelon subsequently won the office in a special election held in the fall of 2006 by defeating Republican State Senator James David Cain of Beauregard Parish.

Wooley and his wife, the former Peggy Cross of Hammond, Louisiana, have a combination of seven children and nine grandchildren. He is a member of the First United Methodist Church of Baton Rouge, LA and is Past President of the Board of the Wesley Foundation Campus Ministry at Louisiana State University

Wooley is a sailing enthusiast who holds a 100-ton master's license from the United States Coast Guard and has raced sailboats across the Caribbean Sea. In 2003, Wooley said that he had sold his 31-foot (9.4 m) sailboat because his job as insurance commissioner did not allow him time for his sailing hobby. At one time he owned a recreational trawler.

Party political offices
| Preceded by Jim Brown | Democratic nominee for Louisiana Insurance Commissioner; 2003 | Vacant Title next held by James W. "Jim" Crowley |
| Preceded by James H. "Jim" Brown | Louisiana Commissioner of Insurance; 2000–2006 | Succeeded by Jim Donelon |
