= Sidney McCrory =

American politician

Louisiana Commissioner of Agriculture and Forestry
- In office May 8, 1956 – May 10, 1960
- Governor: Earl Long
- Preceded by: Dave L. Pearce
- Succeeded by: Dave L. Pearce

Personal details
- Born: Sidney Jackson McCrory; July 27, 1911 Hope Villa, Ascension Parish; Louisiana, USA
- Died: February 27, 1985 (aged 73)
- Resting place: Prairieville Cemetery in Prairieville, Louisiana
- Party: Democratic
- Spouse: Nettie Fay Cooper McCrory
- Children: Sandra M. Lang; Sharon M. Balser
- Parent(s): Cecil C. and Estelle Buffington Buillon McCrory
- Education: Louisiana State University
- Occupation: Entomologist

Sidney Jackson McCrory (July 27, 1911 – February 27, 1985) was the Louisiana Commissioner of Agriculture and Forestry from 1956 to 1960 during the final term of his political ally, Governor Earl Long. He was also a key organizer in 1960 for the John F. Kennedy/Lyndon B. Johnson ticket, which handily carried Louisiana's then ten electoral votes.

== Background ==
McCrory was one of six children born in the village of Hope Villa on Bayou Manchac in Ascension Parish near Baton Rouge to the former Estelle Buffington Buillon and Cecil C. McCrory (1880-1944), a cotton farmer and a graduate of Louisiana State University with degrees in both mechanical and electrical engineering. Cecil McCrory served as adjutant general of the Louisiana National Guard, which he worked to reorganize during the administration of Governor Ruffin G. Pleasant from 1916 to 1920. Cecil McCrory was the head of the national draft system during World War I. In 1927, he became county agent in Caldwell Parish south of Monroe and transferred to Caddo Parish, where in Shreveport, he was the agent for fifteen years before he returned to his farm at Hope Villa.

Sidney McCrory, whose middle name "Jackson" comes from his paternal grandfather, finished LSU with a degree in entomology. Before he was elected agriculture commissioner, he had been the state entomologist and considered himself particularly well versed in the science of insects. McCrory married the former Nettie Fay Cooper (c. 1919–2008), a schoolteacher in East Baton Rouge Parish, a native of Merryville in Beauregard Parish, and the daughter of Mars LeRoy Cooper and Laura Elvira Cooper. The McCrorys had two daughters, Sandra M. Lang and husband, Craig, and Sharon M. Balser.

One of McCrory's sisters, Cherrie Claire, married J. L. Iles, who during World War II was stationed in the Solomon Islands, where he was for a time a roommate of John F. Kennedy. The two were PT boat commanders. Their friendship continued after the war when both attended for several years the annual reunion of their military group in New York City. Sidney McCrory hence endorsed Kennedy when he ran for president, escorted him around the state, and made speeches on Kennedy's behalf. According to Mrs. McCrory, Sidney McCrory worked to have Kennedy named king of the annual International Rice Festival in Crowley, where as a U.S. senator in 1960, he addressed a crowd estimated at 100,000. Also promoting Kennedy in Louisiana was Judge Edmund Reggie of Crowley, whose daughter was later the second wife of U.S. Senator Ted Kennedy, John Kennedy's younger brother.

== Political races ==
Sidney McCrory unseated the one-term commissioner, Dave L. Pearce of West Carroll Parish in northeastern Louisiana, in the primary election held on January 17, 1956. McCrory carried Earl Long's support though Long in 1952 had given Pearce a short-term appointment to the office, which Pearce then won in a special election later in the year.

Pearce, a former member of both houses of the Louisiana Legislature, first ran for agriculture commissioner in 1948 on the intraparty ticket of former Governor Sam Houston Jones of Lake Charles. Jones was handily defeated by Long, who secured a second term. (Long's first term from 1939 to 1940 had been abbreviated.) Pearce lost in 1948 to W. E. Anderson of Tangipahoa Parish, who had succeeded veteran commissioner Harry D. Wilson, also of Tangipahoa Parish, whose tenure had extended from 1916 until Wilson's death in office in January 1948. Anderson was renominated without opposition in 1952 but died at the end of his current term. Long appointed Pearce to finish Anderson's term, and Pearce then won a special election and served in the term of the anti-Long Governor Robert F. Kennon of Minden in Webster Parish in northwestern Louisiana.

William J. "Bill" Dodd, a veteran state officeholder and an astute observer of Louisiana politics in the mid-twentieth century, said that Earl Long "hated" Pearce—the two became estranged shortly after Pearce became commissioner—and put up the "egghead" McCrory to unseat Pearce in the 1956 primary. Dodd did not explain why Long "hated" Pearce, but McCrory unseated Pearce that year.

In his Peapatch Politics: The Earl Long Era in Louisiana Politics, Dodd noted with humor how Long became irritated with McCrory, who had been invited on Long's intraparty ticket

to harass and, we hoped, defeat Uncle Earl's old political enemy, Dave Pearce. All McCrory could talk about was pesticides and how to get rid of different kinds of crop-killing bugs. His main topic and claim to fame, which dominated all of his speeches, whether he was in cotton country, forestry areas, or the city of New Orleans, was his eradicating the pink boll worms from Louisiana cotton fields. Uncle Earl almost went crazy when had to listen to ... McCrory kill enough pink boll worms to fill the Atlantic Ocean.

Pearce staged a comeback and defeated McCrory in the primary held on December 5, 1959, when anti-Long sentiment was running strongly in the state. McCrory was even eliminated from the runoff election. Instead Pearce defeated a third candidate, George W. Shannon, the choice of gubernatorial candidate deLesseps Story Morrison, who was defeated in the runoff election by Jimmie Davis. McCrory ran again in 1963, but Pearce was renominated and unopposed in the general election held on March 3, 1964. At the time the office was called "Commissioner of Agriculture and Immigration". Pearce also prevailed in 1967 and 1971. He had no Republican opposition during any of those elections. In the 1971 contest, Pearce's last successful one, he referred to himself in an advertisement as "Louisiana Top Salesman . . . Progressive, Experienced Administrator."

Preceded by Dave L. Pearce	Louisiana Commissioner of Agriculture and Forestry; 1956–1960	Succeeded by Dave L. Pearce
