= Bolivar E. Kemp =

American politician (1871–1933)

Bolivar Edwards Kemp Sr.
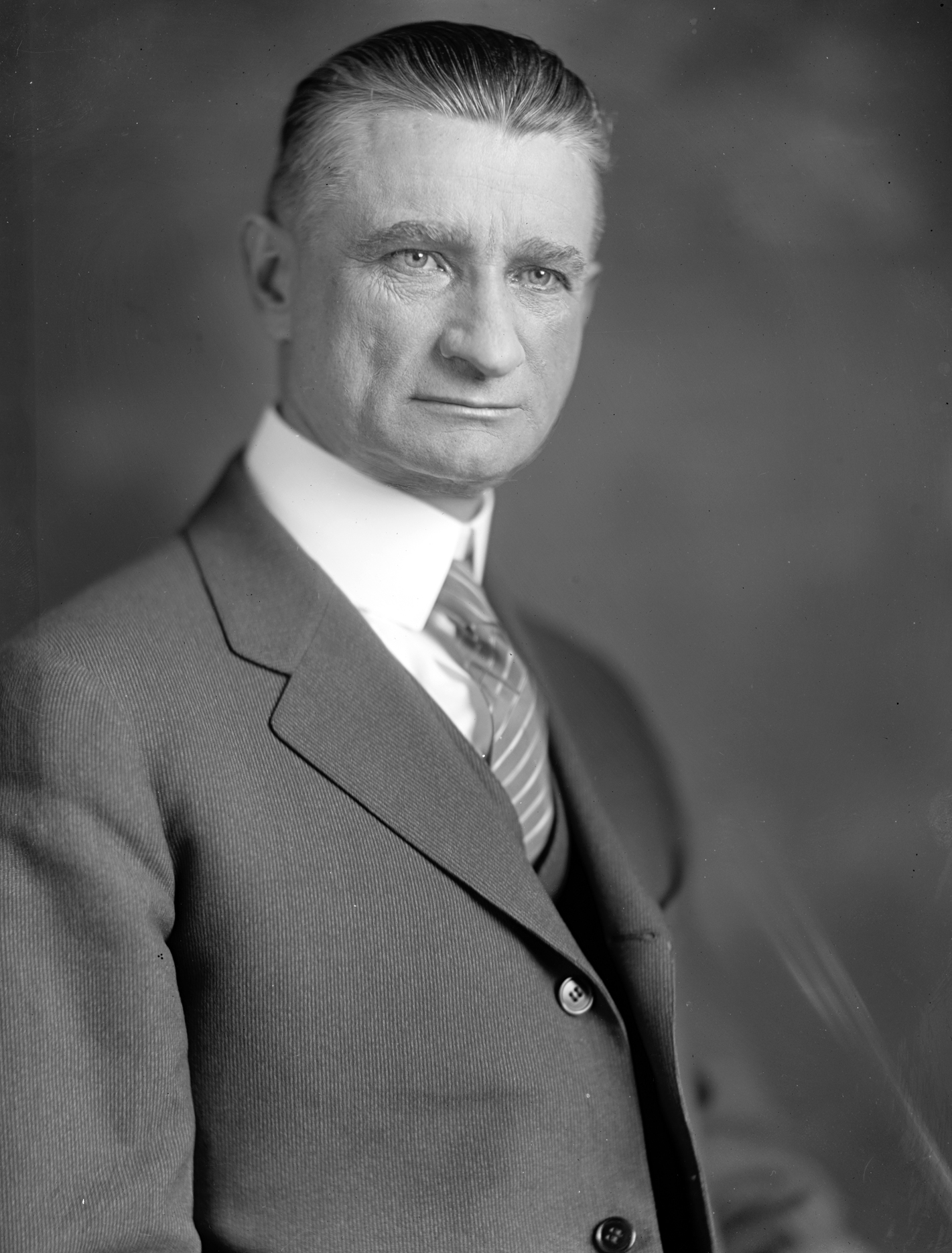

Member of the U.S. House of Representatives from Louisiana's 6th district
- In office March 4, 1925 – June 19, 1933
- Preceded by: George K. Favrot
- Succeeded by: Jared Y. Sanders Jr.

Personal details
- Born: December 28, 1871 St. Helena Parish, Louisiana
- Died: June 19, 1933 (aged 61) Amite, Tangipahoa Parish, Louisiana
- Cause of death: Heart attack
- Resting place: Amite Cemetery
- Party: Democratic
- Spouse(s): Esther Edwards Connor Kemp, known as Lallie Kemp
- Children: Bolivar Edwards Kemp Jr., Eleanor Ogden Kemp Ellis
- Education: Louisiana State University Law Center
- Occupation: Attorney

Bolivar Edwards Kemp Sr. (December 28, 1871, St. Helena Parish, Louisiana – June 19, 1933, Amite, Louisiana), was an attorney and a member of the United States House of Representatives from Louisiana's 6th congressional district.

In 1897, Kemp earned his legal degree from the Louisiana State University Law Center in Baton Rouge and began his law practice in Amite, the parish seat of Tangipahoa Parish, one of the Florida Parishes. In 1910, he was appointed a member of the influential Louisiana State University Board of Supervisors.

A Democrat, Kemp won the 1924 primary election for the 6th district seat and was unopposed in the general election. He ran unopposed in 1926, 1928, and 1930, and he defeated two primary opponents to win a fifth term in 1932. Kemp worked for passage of Mississippi River flood-control legislation, the Great Mississippi Flood having occurred in 1927.

On June 19, 1933, Bolivar Kemp died unexpectedly of a heart attack at his home in Amite three weeks after the similar death of his brother and law partner, William Breed Kemp Jr. His seat ordinarily would have been filled through a special primary and general election. In early December 1933, Governor Oscar K. Allen declared that a special election would be held eight days from the date of his announcement, and he named Kemp's widow, the former Esther Edwards Conner, known as "Lallie" Kemp, as the "unopposed" Democratic nominee. Many protested the announcement, and ballots were destroyed or burned in several locations within the district. After state election officials nevertheless declared Lallie Kemp the winner of the special election, a committee of citizens staged a "revolt election", won by Jared Y. Sanders Jr., supported by district conservatives and anti-Huey Long elements. In January 1934, Mrs. Kemp and Sanders presented their competing claims to the House. The United States House Committee on Elections refused to seat either candidate, and the full House approved the committee report by voice vote. Lallie Kemp declined to run in the subsequent May 1 special election in which Sanders defeated Harry D. Wilson, the Louisiana Commissioner of Agriculture and Forestry.

The Kemps' son, Bolivar Edwards Kemp Jr., a son-in-law of Harry Wilson, served as the Attorney General of Louisiana from 1948 to 1952, between the two terms of Fred S. LeBlanc of Baton Rouge.

Lallie Kemp, who died in 1943, was appointed in 1937 by Governor Richard Leche to the Louisiana Hospital Board. She is honored by the naming of the medical center, a critical access hospital, in Independence.

Bolivar E. Kemp was Episcopalian. He is interred beside his wife and son at Amite Cemetery.

== See also ==
- List of members of the United States Congress who died in office (1900–1949)

U.S. House of Representatives
Preceded by George K. Favrot	Member of the U.S. House of Representatives from Louisiana's 6th congressional district 1925 – 1933	Succeeded by Jared Y. Sanders Jr.
