= Sharkey, Louisiana =

- Unincorporated community
- Location within Louisiana Location within the United States
- Coordinates: 30°22′13″N 90°25′14″W
- Country: United States
- State: Louisiana
- Parish: Tangipahoa
- Elevation: 203 ft (62 m)
- Time zone: UTC-6 (Central (CST))
  - Summer (DST): UTC-5 (CDT)
- Area code: 985
- GNIS feature ID: 541189
- FIPS code: 22-68912

Sharkey is an unincorporated community in Tangipahoa Parish, Louisiana, United States. The community is located 5 miles (8.05 kilometres) S of Ponchatoula, Louisiana.
