= Velma, Louisiana =

- Unincorporated community
- Location within Louisiana Location within the United States
- Coordinates: 30°19′25″N 90°24′27″W
- Country: United States
- State: Louisiana
- Parish: Tangipahoa
- Time zone: UTC-6 (Central (CST))
  - Summer (DST): UTC-5 (CDT)
- Area code: 985
- GNIS feature ID: 549765
- FIPS code: 22-77980

Velma is an unincorporated community in Tangipahoa Parish, Louisiana, United States. The community is located 5 miles (8.05 kilometres) S of Amite City, Louisiana.
