= Justin Wilson (chef) =

American chef, actor and writer (1914–2001)

- Wilson before a table of Cajun foods
- Born: Justin Elmer Wilson; April 24, 1914; Roseland, Louisiana, U.S.
- Died: September 5, 2001 (aged 87); Baton Rouge, Louisiana, U.S.
- Resting place: Port Vincent Community Cemetery. Port Vincent, Livingston Parish, Louisiana
- Occupation: Safety engineer
- Known for: Cajun-inspired humorist and chef
- Political party: Democratic
- Spouses: Sara Rhody Wilson (Deceased); Jeannine Meeds Wilson (Divorced)
- Parents: Harry D. Wilson, Louisiana Agriculture Commissioner (1869–1948); Olivette Mintern Toadvin Wilson
- Relatives: Brother-in-law Bolivar Edwards Kemp, Jr., Louisiana Attorney General (1948–1952)
- Website: justinwilson.com

Justin Elmer Wilson (April 24, 1914 – September 5, 2001) was a Southern American chef and humorist known for his brand of Cajun-inspired cuisine, humor and storytelling.

== Early Life & Career ==
Wilson was born in Roseland near Amite, the seat of Tangipahoa Parish, one of the "Florida Parishes" of southeastern Louisiana. He was the second-youngest of seven children of Harry D. Wilson, the Louisiana Commissioner of Agriculture and Forestry from 1916 to 1948 and a former member of the Louisiana House of Representatives.

While Wilson presented himself as Cajun in his act, it is unclear if he had any actual Acadian or French ancestry. His father Harry Wilson was of Welsh descent. Justin Wilson described his mother, the former Olivet Mintern Toadvin (1880–1976), as Cajun, but she has no known ancestors who either were Acadian, lived in the Cajun regions of Louisiana, or emigrated from France. (She did, however, teach Justin how to cook.) Her surname Toadvin derives from a native of Guernsey who immigrated to Maryland circa 1675. The Florida Parishes, where the family lived, were not part of the French or Spanish colonies of Louisiana.

Wilson began his career as a safety engineer while he traveled throughout Acadiana. The safety lectures that he made to refinery workers prompted him to become a Cajun storyteller. He remembered it this way on the back cover of The Justin Wilson Cook Book:

Way back when I first started as a safety engineer, I took myself pretty seriously, and I found I was putting my audiences to sleep. So having lived all my life among the Cajuns of Louisiana, and having a good memory for the patois and the type of humor Cajuns go for, I started interspersing my talks on safety with Cajun humor.

Wilson later recorded several comedy albums, beginning with The Humorous World of Justin Wilson on Ember Records. He also recorded several albums for Jewel Records on the Paula label and a few for Capitol Records. He later appeared as a guest on the popular CBS series The Ed Sullivan Show. He was known for the catchphrase, "I gar-on-tee!" (I guarantee). As a comedian, Wilson was enormously popular in Louisiana, and to a lesser degree in neighboring states, but his humor may have been a little too specifically regional to enjoy the wider popularity of Southern comics such as Jerry Clower or Archie Campbell.

He composed ten songs, as well as composing the background music for his cooking show, and recorded one album of Christmas songs with a jazz band. Wilson wrote seven Cajun cookbooks and two books of Cajun stories. He hosted several cooking shows on Louisiana Public Broadcasting (LPB) during the 1980s and 1990s including “Louisiana Cookin’,” which was distributed nationally on Public Broadcasting Services (PBS) and at least one in 1975, for Mississippi Educational Television (ETV), that combined Cajun cooking and humor. Some episodes were aired from the studios of WYES-TV in New Orleans.

Wilson appeared in a series of television commercials for Cajun Spice Ruffles potato chips during the late 1980s. In 1997, he published the cookbook "Looking Back", which combined his first two cookbooks in a hardcover format, with additional photos, and notes on how his cooking techniques had changed (e. g., using olive oil instead of oleo) since those early cookbooks were published. A companion series was produced, also titled "Looking Back" and broadcast nationwide on PBS, which was a repackaging of Wilson's first cooking show from 1971, with new intros by Wilson himself. This was the first time the 1971 programs were ever seen nationwide, as they were originally produced by Mississippi Educational Television and, at that time, were only broadcast regionally.

Southern author Harnett T. Kane said of Wilson: "I know of no one [else] who portrays the Louisiana Cajun as well, so skillfully and entertainingly".

But Wilson faced criticism from many Cajuns who viewed his humor as degrading, especially from a non-Cajun essentially doing a Cajun impression. James Domengeaux, a former member of Congress and founder of CODOFIL, considered Wilson a degrader of the Cajun people.

== Politics ==
Wilson was a segregationist, speaking at least twice at national leadership conferences of the Citizens' Councils, alongside Lester Maddox, John Rarick, and John G. Schmitz.

== Personal life ==
Justin Wilson was married four times. His third wife died and his three other marriages ended in divorce. He had one son and three daughters: Harry D. Wilson II, Sara Sue, Pam, and Menette. Wilson's last residence was in Summit in Pike County, Mississippi. He died on September 5, 2001, of heart failure in Baton Rouge, Louisiana. He is interred beside his third wife at Port Vincent Community Cemetery (also known as Saint William Catholic Cemetery) in Port Vincent in Livingston Parish.

== Bibliography ==
=== By Justin Wilson ===
- The Justin Wilson Cook Book (1965)
- Justin Wilson's Cajun Humor (1974)
- The Justin Wilson #2 Cookbook: Cookin' Cajun (1979)
- Justin Wilson's Cajun Fables (1982)
- The Justin Wilson Gourmet and Gourmand Cookbook (1984)
- More Cajun Humor (1984)
- Justin Wilson's Outdoor Cooking with Inside Help (1986)
- Justin Wilson's Homegrown Louisiana Cookin' (1990)
- Justin Wilson Looking Back: A Cajun Cookbook (1997)
- Justin Wilson's Easy Cookin': 150 Rib-Tickling Recipes for Good Eating (1998)

=== Other authors ===
- William J. "Bill" Dodd, Peapatch Politics: The Earl Long Era in Louisiana Politics. Baton Rouge: Claitor's Publishing, 1991.
- Kevin S. Fontenot, "How Y'all Are: Justin Wilson and Cajun Comedy" in Accordions, Fiddles, Two Step and Swing: A Cajun Music Reader. Ryan A. Brasseaux and Kevin S. Fontenot, eds. Lafayette: The Center for Louisiana Studies, 2006.

== Discography (partial) ==
- The Humorous World of Justin Wilson, Ember (1960)
- I Gawr-On-Tee, Project Records (1961)
- Justin Wilson's Wilsonville U.S. and A. (1965)
- How Y'all Are! (1967)
- Whooooo Boy (1967)
- Justin Wilson Says, "Me, I got a frien'!" (196?)
- The Wondermus Humor Of Justin Wilson (1966)
- Across The U.S. And A. With Justin Wilson (1970)
- Hunting With Justin Wilson (1972)
- Justin Wilson, The Old Master Story Teller (1972)
- Justin Wilson Meets Jean (John) Barleycorn (1973)
- A Cajun Christmas with Justin Wilson (1973)
- Keep it Clean (1974)
- The Sport (1974)
- Justifyin' Justin Wilson (1975)
- Justin Wilson Reading Christmas Stories (1975)
- In Orbit (1975)
- Caught Dem Fish (1979)
- Courtin' Songs (1979)
- Christmas Cajun Style (1979)
- Laugh A Little With Justin Wilson (198?)
- Truckin' With Justin Wilson (1980)
- Justin Wilson's Ol Favorites (1982)
- The Unforgettable Stories Of Justin Wilson (1985)
- Pass(ing) A Good Time With Justin Wilson (1986)
- The Crazy Cajun Comedy Of Justin Wilson (1987)
- Shot Dem Duck and Hunt (1996)
- If It Ain't Fun, Don't Do It (200?)
- Justin's Picks (200?)
- Cajun King of Comedy (2009)
