= 1998 United States Senate election in Louisiana =

- November 3, 1998
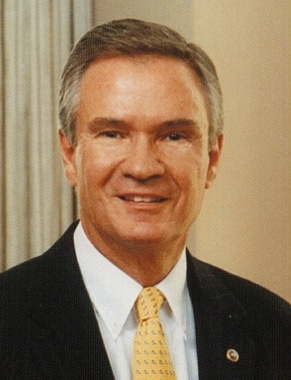

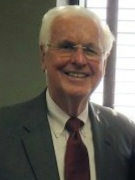
Nominee	John Breaux	Jim Donelon
Party	Democratic	Republican
Popular vote	620,502	306,616
Percentage	64.02%	31.64%
- Parish results Breaux: 40–50% 50–60% 60–70% 70–80% 80–90% Donelon: 50–60%
U.S. senator before election
John Breaux
Democratic
Elected U.S. Senator
John Breaux
Democratic

The 1998 United States Senate election in Louisiana was held November 3, 1998. Incumbent Senator John Breaux won re-election to a third term. As of 2024, this is the last time that the Democrats have won the Class 3 Senate seat from Louisiana.

== Major candidates ==
=== Democratic ===
- John Breaux, incumbent U.S. Senator

=== Republican ===
- Jim Donelon, State Representative

== Results ==
Louisiana United States Senate election, 1998
Party	Candidate	Votes	%
Democratic	John Breaux (incumbent)	620,502	64.02%
Republican	Jim Donelon	306,616	31.64%
Independent	Raymond Brown	12,203	1.26%
Democratic	Sam Houston Melton	9,893	1.02%
Republican	Darryl Paul Ward	7,964	0.82%
Independent	L. D. Knox	6,366	0.66%
Independent	Jeffrey H. Diket	3,227	0.33%
Independent	Martin A. Rosenthal	2,398	0.25%
Total votes		969,169	100%
Democratic hold			

== See also ==
- 1998 United States Senate elections
