= Rosaryville, Louisiana =

- Unincorporated community
- Location within Louisiana Location within the United States
- Coordinates: 30°25′23″N 90°31′10″W
- Country: United States
- State: Louisiana
- Parish: Tangipahoa
- Elevation: 13 ft (4.0 m)
- Time zone: UTC-6 (Central (CST))
  - Summer (DST): UTC-5 (CDT)
- Area code: 985
- GNIS feature ID: 555832

Rosaryville (also Gessen) is an unincorporated community in Tangipahoa Parish, Louisiana, United States.
