= Rufus D. Hayes =

American politician

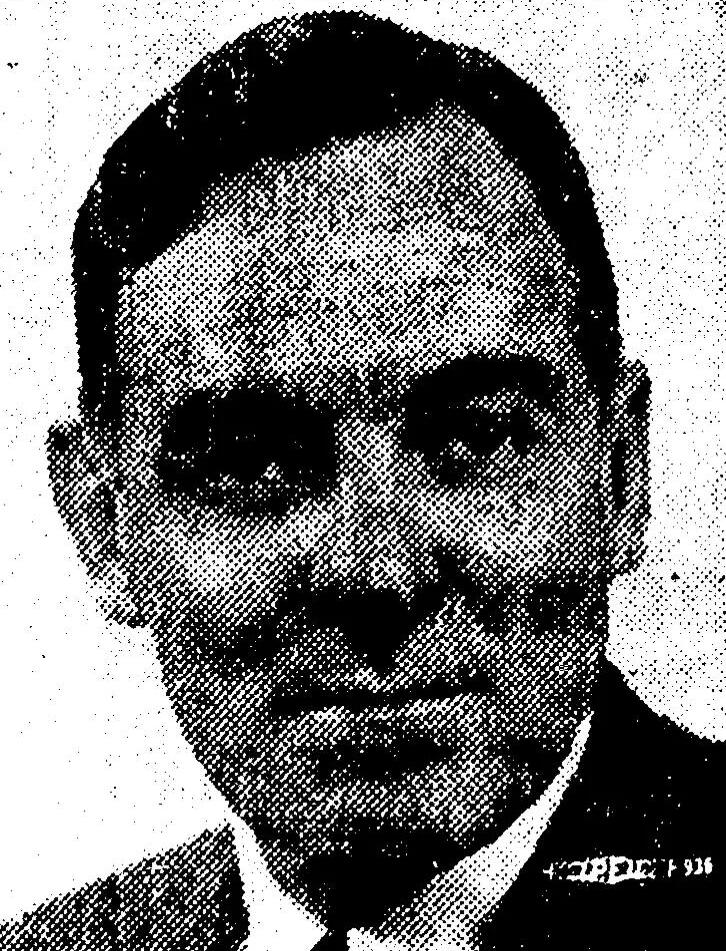
- Hayes in 1959

Insurance Commissioner of Louisiana
- In office 1957–1964
- Governor: Earl Long; Jimmie Davis
- Preceded by: Position established
- Succeeded by: Dudley A. Guglielmo

Personal details
- Born: Rufus Delbert Hayes; May 15, 1913 Bertram, Texas, U.S.
- Died: February 12, 2002 (aged 88) Baton Rouge, Louisiana, U.S.
- Party: Democratic
- Education: Louisiana State University Law Center

Rufus Delbert Hayes (May 15, 1913 – February 12, 2002) was an American politician. A member of the Democratic Party, he served as insurance commissioner of Louisiana from 1957 to 1964.

== Life and career ==
Hayes was born in Bertram, Texas. He attended Louisiana State University Law Center, earning his law degree in 1938. After earning his degree, he served in the United States Navy during World War II, which after his discharge, he worked as a district attorney in East Baton Rouge Parish, Louisiana.

Hayes served as insurance commissioner of Louisiana from 1957 to 1964.

== Death ==
Hayes died in Baton Rouge, Louisiana on February 12, 2002, at the age of 88.
