= Michael Mayes (American football) =

American football player (born 1966)

No. 22, 23
- Position: Defensive back

Personal information
- Born: August 17, 1966 (age 60); DeRidder, Louisiana, U.S.
- Listed height: 5 ft 10 in (1.78 m)
- Listed weight: 182 lb (83 kg)

Career information
- High school: DeRidder
- College: LSU
- NFL draft: 1989: 4th round, 106th overall pick

Career history
- New Orleans Saints (1989); Kansas City Chiefs (1989)*; New York Jets (1990); Minnesota Vikings (1991)
- * Offseason or practice squad member only

Career NFL statistics
- Interceptions: 1
- Fumble recoveries: 1
- Sacks: 1
- Stats at Pro Football Reference

Michael Oneal Mayes (born August 17, 1966) is an American former professional football player who was a defensive back in the National Football League (NFL). He played college football for the LSU Tigers.

Mayes was born in DeRidder, Louisiana and attended DeRidder High School. He played collegiately at Louisiana State University and was selected by the New Orleans Saints in the fourth round of the 1989 NFL draft, the 106th overall pick.

Mayes played for the Saints, New York Jets, and Minnesota Vikings during his three-year NFL career.
