= Roseland, Louisiana =

- Town
- Town of Roseland
- Location of Roseland in Tangipahoa Parish, Louisiana.

- Location of Louisiana in the United States
- Coordinates: 30°45′38″N 90°30′26″W
- Country: United States
- State: Louisiana
- Parish: Tangipahoa
- Incorporated: 1738

Area
  - Total: 2.27 sq mi (5.87 km^{2})
  - Land: 2.08 sq mi (5.38 km^{2})
  - Water: 0.19 sq mi (0.49 km^{2})
- Elevation: 131 ft (40 m)

Population (2020)
  - Total: 880
  - Density: 424/sq mi (163.7/km^{2})
- Time zone: UTC-6 (CST)
  - Summer (DST): UTC-5 (CDT)
- ZIP code: 70456
- Area code: 985
- FIPS code: 22-66165
- GNIS feature ID: 2407246
- Website: www.townofroseland.org

Roseland is a town in Tangipahoa Parish, Louisiana, United States. The population was 1,123 at the 2010 census and 880 in 2020. It is the birthplace of Cajun chef and storyteller Justin Wilson. Roseland is part of the Hammond MSA.

== Geography ==
According to the United States Census Bureau, the town has a total area of 2.3 square miles (5.9 km^{2}), of which 2.1 square miles (5.5 km^{2}) is land and 0.1 square mile (0.3 km^{2}) (5.75%) is water.

== History ==
John Bel Edwards lived on Louisiana Avenue in Roseland when he was elected governor of Louisiana on November 21, 2015. His residence, Egypta Hall, was built in 1888 and was originally a rooming house before being converted into a residence.

== Demographics ==
Historical population
Census	Pop.	Note	%±
1890	281		—
1910	586		—
1920	603		2.9%
1930	1,139		88.9%
1940	873		−23.4%
1950	1,038		18.9%
1960	1,254		20.8%
1970	1,273		1.5%
1980	1,346		5.7%
1990	1,093		−18.8%
2000	1,162		6.3%
2010	1,123		−3.4%
2020	880		−21.6%
2025 (est.)	910	▲	3.4%
U.S. Decennial Census

Roseland racial composition as of 2020
Race	Number	Percentage
White (non-Hispanic)	296	33.64%
Black or African American (non-Hispanic)	540	61.36%
Native American	3	0.34%
Asian	2	0.23%
Other/Mixed	22	2.5%
Hispanic or Latino	17	1.93%

As of the 2020 United States census, there were 880 people, 366 households, and 250 families residing in the town.

== Education ==
Tangipahoa Parish School Board operates public schools:

- Roseland Elementary School
