= Doug Green (Louisiana politician) =

American politician and convicted felon

Douglas D. "Doug" Green

Louisiana Insurance Commissioner
- In office March 14, 1988 – March 13, 1991
- Governor: Buddy Roemer
- Preceded by: Sherman A. Bernard
- Succeeded by: Interim commissioner, then: James H. "Jim" Brown, elected 1991

Personal details
- Born: c. 1950
- Party: Democratic
- Spouse: Linn Green
- Occupation: Prior to 1987: employee of IBM

Douglas D. Green, known as Doug Green (born c. 1950), is the former Louisiana insurance commissioner who held the office from 1988 to 1991, when he received a 25-year federal sentence for taking $2 million in illegal campaign contributions from owners of insurance companies doing business with the state. Green's predecessor and fellow Democrat Sherman A. Bernard, whom he unseated in the 1987 nonpartisan blanket primary, pleaded guilty to extorting bribes disguised as campaign contributions and served forty-one months during the middle 1990s in a federal prison in Alabama.

== Election in 1987 ==
The 37-year-old Green, a candidate previously unknown, was described by one publication as having "looked like the boy next door". Green nevertheless upset Bernard in the 1987 primary, 773,026 votes (55.3 percent) to 456,539 (32.6 percent). Green had run on a platform calling for reform in the department - he even called himself "Mr. Clean".

== Trial in 1991 ==
However, Green was subsequently heavily implicated in the Champion insurance scandal and received a far greater sentence than had Bernard for similar offenses but involving much less money. Champion wrote high-risk automobile policies for premium coverage at a lower price than was offered by its competition. In exchange for regulatory favors, Champion made more than $2 million in campaign contributions to Green. The failed Champion company left $150 million in unpaid claims covered by taxpayers. Unwilling to admit wrongdoing and to accept a plea bargain, Green was convicted of the charges against him and had to resign his office before the end of his term.

Specifically, Green was found guilty on March 13, 1991, of twenty-eight counts of conspiracy and mail fraud and two counts of laundering campaign loans. He was first suspended without pay, and Governor Buddy Roemer appointed an acting commissioner pending the regular November election. United States District Judge for the Eastern District of Louisiana George Arceneaux, of Houma ordered Green to serve the maximum under federal guidelines: twenty-eight concurrent five-year terms on the conspiracy/mail fraud and two concurrent 20-year terms for money laundering. A jury determined that Green conspired with John and Naaman Eicher of the Champion Insurance Company, his largest campaign donors, to keep the failing company intact. According to prosecution evidence, Green received $2.7 million in bribes.

== Imprisonment, 1991-2003 ==
Green reported to prison on August 1, 1991. In June 1992, he lost his appeal to the United States Court of Appeals for the Fifth Circuit in New Orleans. The appellate judges noted that Green had been paid $2,000 per month to "run for office" and was provided with a fashion consultant. The Eichers also gave funds to hire Green's brother as his driver and pay for an apartment. Green's attorney was the court-appointed counsel, former State Representative Risley C. Triche of Napoleonville.

After serving almost half of the 25-year sentence at the U.S. prison in Pensacola, Florida, Green was released on September 17, 2003.

== Comeback ==
Sherman Bernard attempted a comeback in October 1991 but was defeated in the primary. Victory ultimately went to James H. "Jim" Brown, the former Louisiana Secretary of State and state senator from Concordia Parish, who won the general election over the Republican Peggy Wilson, a member of the New Orleans City Council. Brown later had his own legal troubles and was forced to vacate the office in 2000.

Preceded by Sherman A. Bernard	Louisiana Commissioner of Insurance; 1988–1991	Succeeded by Interim commissioner followed by: James H. "Jim" Brown
