= Bolivar Edwards Kemp Jr. =

American lawyer and politician

Louisiana Attorney General
- In office 1948–1952
- Governor: Earl K. Long
- Preceded by: Fred S. LeBlanc
- Succeeded by: Fred S. LeBlanc

Personal details
- Born: September 23, 1904 Amite, Tangipahoa Parish; Louisiana, USA
- Died: October 27, 1965 (aged 61)
- Party: Democratic
- Spouse: Menette Wilson Kemp (sister of Justin Wilson)
- Children: No children
- Parent(s): Bolivar E. Kemp; Esther Edwards Conner Kemp
- Education: Tulane University Law School
- Occupation: Attorney

Bolivar Edwards Kemp Jr. (September 23, 1904 – October 27, 1965), was the attorney general of Louisiana from 1948 to 1952 during the administration of Louisiana Governor Earl Kemp Long. A Democrat, Kemp was allied with the Long faction in state politics.

Legal offices
Preceded by Fred S. LeBlanc	Louisiana Attorney General; 1948–1952	Succeeded by Fred S. LeBlanc
