= Bob Odom =

American politician (1935–2014)

Louisiana Commissioner of Agriculture and Forestry
- In office March 10, 1980 – January 14, 2008
- Governor: Dave Treen; Buddy Roemer; Edwin Edwards; Mike Foster; Kathleen Blanco
- Preceded by: Gilbert L. "Gil" Dozier
- Succeeded by: Michael G. Strain

Personal details
- Born: Robert Fulton Odom, Jr. July 20, 1935 Haynesville, Claiborne Parish, Louisiana
- Died: May 17, 2014 (aged 78) Zachary, East Baton Rouge Parish; Louisiana
- Resting place: Beulah Plains Cemetery in Zachary
- Party: Democratic
- Spouse: Mildred "Millie" Randolph Odom
- Children: Robert Odom, III Ashley Odom Thompson White Four grandchildren
- Education: Southeastern Louisiana University
- Occupation: Farmer; consultant

Military service
- Branch/service: United States Marine Corps

Robert Fulton Odom, Jr. (July 20, 1935 – May 17, 2014), was the longest-serving Commissioner of Agriculture and Forestry in the U.S. state of Louisiana.

Odom was raised on a cotton and dairy farm near Haynesville, Louisiana.

== Electoral history ==
Commissioner of Agriculture and Forestry, 1987

Threshold > 50%

First ballot, October 24, 1987

Party	Candidate	Votes	%
Democratic	Bob Odom	993,869	73
Republican	Don Johnson	190,502	14
Democratic	Loston "Bubba" Borque, Jr.	104,628	8
Democratic	Ambrose A. "Butch" Estay	63,673	5
Total		1,352,672	100
Democratic hold			

Commissioner of Agriculture and Forestry, 1991

Threshold > 50%

First ballot, October 19, 1991

Party	Candidate	Votes	%
Democratic	Bob Odom (inc.)	824,167	60
Republican	Don Johnson	199,688	15
Democratic	Jack Keahey	146,256	11
Republican	John Impson	107,392	8
Democratic	Buster Fresina	99,430	7
Total		1,376,933	100
Democratic hold			

Commissioner of Agriculture and Forestry, 1995

Threshold > 50%

First ballot, October 21, 1995

Party	Candidate	Votes	%
Democratic	Bob Odom (inc.)	980,909	74
Republican	Don Johnson	272,349	21
Democratic	Buster Fresina	71,829	5
Total		1,325,087	100
Democratic hold			

Commissioner of Agriculture and Forestry, 1999

Threshold > 50%

First ballot, October 23, 1999

Party	Candidate	Votes	%
Democratic	Bob Odom (inc.)	Unopposed	100
Total			100
Democratic hold			

Commissioner of Agriculture and Forestry, 2003

Threshold > 50%

First ballot, October 4, 2003

Party	Candidate	Votes	%
Democratic	Bob Odom (inc.)	822,682	66
Republican	Don Johnson	430,856	34
Total		1,253,538	100
Democratic hold			

Commissioner of Agriculture and Forestry, 2007

Threshold > 50%

First ballot, October 20, 2007

Party	Candidate	Votes	%
Republican	Mike Strain	494,760	40
Democratic	Bob Odom (inc.)	505,504	41
Republican	Wayne Carter	152,893	13
Republican	Don Johnson	69,470	6
Total		1,222,627	100
Republican gain from Democratic			

Runoff did not occur and Strain won due to Odom withdrawing.

== See also ==
Party political offices
Vacant Title last held by Dave L. Pearce	Democratic nominee for Agriculture and Forestry Commissioner of Louisiana; 1999, 2003	Vacant Title next held by Jamie LaBranche
Political offices
Preceded by Gilbert L. "Gil" Dozier (D)	Commissioner of Agriculture & Forestry; 1980–2008	Succeeded by Michael Gene Strain (R)
