= Tim Temple =

American politician

Insurance Commissioner of Louisiana
- Incumbent
- Assumed office January 8, 2024
- Governor: Jeff Landry
- Preceded by: Jim Donelon

Personal details
- Born: Timothy Temple; 1969 or 1970 (age 55–56)
- Party: Republican
- Spouse: Amy
- Children: 2
- Education: Southern Methodist University (BA)

Timothy Temple (born 1969 or 1970) is an American politician from Louisiana. He has served as the Louisiana Insurance Commissioner since January 2024.

Temple graduated from DeRidder High School in DeRidder, Louisiana, and Southern Methodist University. After graduating, he became an insurance agent. He became the president of Temptan, a family-owned company.

In 2019, Temple ran against Jim Donelon for Louisiana Insurance Commissioner in the 2019 election. Donelon won reelection. Temple ran again in the 2023 election. Donelon opted not to run for reelection and Temple's only challenger dropped out of the race in August.

Temple recommended a package of bills that loosened regulations on insurance companies, including tort reform, that passed the Louisiana Legislature and was signed into law by Governor Jeff Landry.

Temple and his wife, Amy, have two children and live in Baton Rouge, Louisiana.

Political offices
Preceded by Jim Donelon	Insurance Commissioner of Louisiana; 2024–present	Incumbent
