= Mike Strain =

American politician (born 1959)

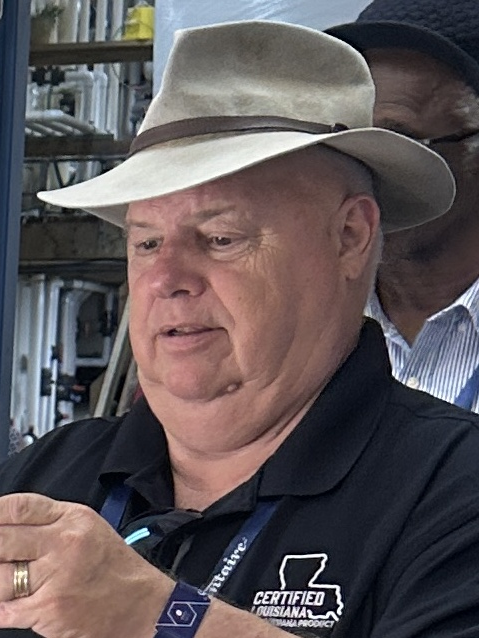
- Strain in 2026

Agriculture Commissioner of Louisiana
- Incumbent
- Assumed office January 14, 2008
- Governor: Bobby Jindal; John Bel Edwards; Jeff Landry
- Preceded by: Bob Odom

Personal details
- Born: Michael Gene Strain; December 2, 1959 (age 66) Covington, Louisiana, U.S.
- Party: Republican
- Education: Louisiana State University (BS, DVM)

Michael Gene Strain (born December 2, 1959) is an American politician from Louisiana. He is the Louisiana Agriculture and Forestry Commissioner.

Strain is from Abita Springs, Louisiana. He is a veterinarian.

Strain joined the Louisiana House of Representatives in 2000. He ran for commissioner of agriculture in the 2007 Louisiana elections and defeated Bob Odom, the incumbent, becoming the first Republican to hold the position. In 2015, Strain secured his third term as commissioner of agriculture. He won his fourth term in 2019.

Strain's wife is also a veterinarian.

Party political offices
| Preceded by Don Johnson | Republican nominee for Agriculture Commissioner of Louisiana; 2007, 2011, 2023 | Most recent |
Political offices
| Preceded by Bob Odom | Agriculture Commissioner of Louisiana; 2008–present | Incumbent |
