= Louisiana Insurance Commissioner =

Statewide constitutional office regulating the insurance industry in Louisiana

- Incumbent; Tim Temple since January 8, 2024
- Louisiana Department of Insurance
- Term length: 4 years
- Inaugural holder: Rufus D. Hayes
- Formation: 1957
- Website: Louisiana Department of Insurance

The Louisiana insurance commissioner is a statewide constitutional officer who regulates the insurance industry in Louisiana. The insurance commissioner serves as the head of the Louisiana Department of Insurance, which consists of ten divisions; Consumer Advocacy, Financial Solvency, Health Insurance, Legal Services, Licensing & Compliance, Minority Affairs, Management & Finance, Public Affairs, Property & Casualty, and Receivership. Louisiana is one of 11 states that elect the chief insurance regulator. The first office holder was Rufus D. Hayes, who was appointed by the governor in 1957, then elected for another term. The current Insurance Commissioner is Tim Temple. Three of the four insurance commissioners prior to Donelon, Jim Brown, Sherman A. Bernard, and Doug Green, have been convicted of federal crimes and spent time in prison.

== List of insurance commissioners ==
Name	Term	Party
Rufus D. Hayes	1957–1964	Democratic
Dudley A. Guglielmo	1964–1972	Democratic
Sherman A. Bernard	1972–1988	Democratic
Doug Green	1988–1991	Democratic
Jim Brown	1991–2000	Democratic
J. Robert Wooley	2000–2006	Democratic
Jim Donelon	2006–2024	Republican
Tim Temple	2024–present	Republican
