= Jim Donelon =

American politician

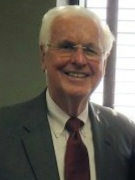

Insurance Commissioner of Louisiana
- In office February 15, 2006 – January 8, 2024
- Governor: Kathleen Blanco; Bobby Jindal; John Bel Edwards
- Preceded by: J. Robert Wooley
- Succeeded by: Tim Temple

Member of the Louisiana House of Representatives from the 98th district
- In office January 1982 – June 30, 2001
- Preceded by: Charles Grisbaum
- Succeeded by: Tom Capella

Personal details
- Born: James Joseph Donelon III; December 14, 1944 (age 81) New Orleans, Louisiana, U.S.
- Party: Democratic (Before 1980); Republican (1980–present)
- Spouse: Merilynn Boudreaux
- Children: 4 daughters
- Education: University of New Orleans (BA); Loyola University, New Orleans (JD)

Military service
- Allegiance: United States
- Branch/service: United States Army
- Rank: Colonel
- Unit: Louisiana Army National Guard
- Awards: Legion of Merit

James Joseph Donelon III is an American politician. He served as the Louisiana Insurance Commissioner from 2006 to 2024. He previously served as a member of the Louisiana House of Representatives from 1981 to 2001.

== Early life and education ==
Donelon grew up in New Orleans and attended Jesuit High School. He received his bachelor's degree from the University of New Orleans and his Juris Doctor from the Loyola University New Orleans College of Law.

== Political career ==
Donelon began his career in public office serving on the Jefferson Parish Council from 1978 to 1980. From 1982 to 2001, he served as a Republican member of the Louisiana House of Representatives. As a state lawmaker, he chaired the House Committee on Insurance and co-chaired the Republican Legislative Delegation.

He ran for Lieutenant Governor of Louisiana in 1979 and for United States Senate in 1998, but he lost both races.

In 2001, he was appointed deputy commissioner of the Louisiana Department of Insurance by then-Insurance Commissioner J. Robert Wooley. In February 2006, Wooley resigned to take a legal position with the firm Adams and Reese in Baton Rouge, and Donelon succeeded him in the position of Insurance Commissioner. Donelon subsequently won the office in a special election held in the fall of 2006 by defeating Republican State Senator James David Cain of Beauregard Parish.

While Insurance Commissioner, Donelon allowed a temporary rehabilitation, known as a "conservation proceeding", which gave Lighthouse Insurance time to raise $65 million in new capital investments despite the company reporting three straight years of net losses from 2020 storms in Louisiana. It was the first time in years that a Louisiana carrier had been covered by a conservation proceeding. In March 2022, Donelon signed an order placing Lighthouse Insurance in liquidation proceedings after its losses from Hurricane Ida.

Donelon decided not to seek another term in the 2023 Louisiana elections. He was succeeded by Tim Temple on January 8, 2024.

In 2022, he was inducted into the Louisiana Political Museum and Hall of Fame

== Personal life ==
Donelon and his wife, Merilynn, have four daughters.

Louisiana House of Representatives
Preceded by Charles Grisbaum	Member of the Louisiana House of Representatives from the 88th district 1982–2001	Succeeded by Tom Capella
Party political offices
Preceded by Lyle Stocksill	Republican nominee for U.S. Senator from Louisiana (Class 3); 1998	Succeeded by David Vitter
Preceded by Daniel G. Kyle	Republican nominee for Louisiana Insurance Commissioner; 2007	Succeeded by Tim Temple
Political offices
Preceded by J. Robert Wooley	Insurance Commissioner of Louisiana; 2006–2024	Succeeded by Tim Temple
