= James H. Brown (politician) =

American politician

Member of the Louisiana State Senate
- In office 1972–1980

35th Secretary of State of Louisiana
- In office 1980–1988
- Governor: Dave Treen; Edwin Edwards
- Preceded by: Paul Hardy
- Succeeded by: W. Fox McKeithen

Insurance Commissioner of Louisiana
- In office 1991–2000
- Governor: Buddy Roemer; Edwin Edwards; Mike Foster
- Preceded by: Doug Green
- Succeeded by: J. Robert Wooley

Personal details
- Born: May 6, 1940 (age 86)
- Party: Democratic
- Children: 4; including Campbell Brown

James H. Brown (born May 6, 1940) is an American politician. A member of the Democratic Party, he served as secretary of state of Louisiana from 1980 to 1988, and as insurance commissioner of Louisiana from 1991 to 2000.

During his service as commissioner, Brown was found guilty of lying to a federal agent and served six months in federal prison. In 2011, he was inducted into the Louisiana Political Museum and Hall of Fame.
