= Insurance commissioner =

Public official in the United States

An insurance commissioner (or commissioner of insurance) is a public official in the executive branch of a state or territory in the United States who, along with their office, regulate the insurance industry. The powers granted to the office of an insurance commissioner differ in each state. The office of an insurance commissioner is established either by the state constitution or by statute. While most insurance commissioners are appointed, in some jurisdictions they are elected. The office of the insurance commissioner may be part of a larger regulatory agency, or an autonomous department.

Insurance law and regulation is established individually by each state. In order to better coordinate insurance regulation among the states and territories, insurance commissioners are members of the National Association of Insurance Commissioners (NAIC).

== Duties and powers of insurance commissioners ==
The purpose of insurance commissioners is to maintain fair pricing for insurance products, protect the solvency of insurance companies, prevent unfair practices by insurance companies, and ensure availability of insurance coverage. In order to accomplish these goals, each state grants several powers to insurance commissioners and their offices, including:

- Approval of insurance rates
- Periodical financial examinations of insurers
- Licensing of companies, agencies, agents, and brokers
- Monitoring and regulating claims handling

== List of current insurance commissioners ==
As of January 12, 2025, the various insurance commissioners are:

State/territory	Name	Title	Name of Office	Elected/Appointed
Alabama	Mark Fowler	Commissioner	Alabama Department of Insurance	Appointed
Alaska	Lori K. Wing-Heier	Director	Alaska Division of Insurance	Appointed
American Samoa	Peni 'Ben' Itula Sapini Teo	Commissioner	Office of the Governor	Appointed
Arizona	Barbara D. Richardson	Director	Arizona Department of Insurance and Financial Institutions	Appointed
Arkansas	Alan McClain	Commissioner	Arkansas Insurance Department	Appointed
California	Ricardo Lara	Commissioner	California Department of Insurance	Elected
Colorado	Michael Conway	Commissioner	Colorado Division of Insurance	Appointed
Connecticut	Andrew N. Mais	Commissioner	Connecticut Insurance Department	Appointed
Delaware	Trinidad Navarro	Commissioner	Delaware Department of Insurance	Elected
District of Columbia	Karima Woods	Commissioner	District of Columbia Department of Insurance, Securities, and Banking	Appointed
Florida	Michael Yaworsky	Commissioner	Florida Office of Insurance Regulation	Appointed
Georgia	John F. King	Commissioner	Office of Insurance and Safety Fire Commissioner	Elected
Guam	Michelle Santos	Commissioner	Guam Department of Revenue and Taxation	Appointed
Hawaii	Gordon I. Ito	Commissioner	Hawaii Insurance Division	Appointed
Idaho	Dean Cameron	Director	Idaho Department of Insurance	Appointed
Illinois	Ann Gillespie	Director	Illinois Department of Insurance	Appointed
Indiana	Holly W. Lambert	Commissioner	Indiana Department of Insurance	Appointed
Iowa	Doug Ommen	Commissioner	Iowa Insurance Division	Appointed
Kansas	Vicki Schmidt	Commissioner	Kansas Insurance Department	Elected
Kentucky	Sharon Clark	Commissioner	Kentucky Department of Insurance	Appointed
Louisiana	Tim Temple	Commissioner	Louisiana Department of Insurance	Elected
Maine	Robert L. Carey	Superintendent	Maine Bureau of Insurance	Appointed
Maryland	Marie Grant	Commissioner	Maryland Insurance Administration	Appointed
Massachusetts	Michael T. Caljouw	Commissioner	Massachusetts Division of Insurance	Appointed
Michigan	Anita G. Fox	Director	Michigan Department of Insurance and Financial Services	Appointed
Minnesota	Grace Arnold	Commissioner	Minnesota Department of Commerce	Appointed
Mississippi	Mike Chaney	Commissioner	Mississippi Insurance Department	Elected
Missouri	Angela L. Nelson	Director	Missouri Department of Commerce and Insurance	Appointed
Montana	James Brown	Commissioner	Montana Office of the Commissioner of Securities and Insurance	Elected
Nebraska	Eric Dunning	Director	Nebraska Department of Insurance	Appointed
Nevada	Scott Kipper	Commissioner	Nevada Division of Insurance	Appointed
New Hampshire	D.J. Bettencourt	Commissioner	New Hampshire Insurance Department	Appointed
New Jersey	Justin Zimmerman	Commissioner	New Jersey Department of Banking and Insurance	Appointed
New Mexico	Alice T. Kane	Superintendent	New Mexico Office of Superintendent of Insurance	Appointed
New York	Adrienne A. Harris	Superintendent	New York State Department of Financial Services	Appointed
North Carolina	Mike Causey	Commissioner	Commissioner of Insurance	Elected
North Dakota	Jon Godfread	Commissioner	North Dakota Insurance Department	Elected
Northern Mariana Islands	Remedio C. Mafnas	Commissioner	Office of the Insurance Commissioner	Appointed
Ohio	Judith L. French	Director	Ohio Department of Insurance	Appointed
Oklahoma	Glen Mulready	Commissioner	Oklahoma Insurance Department	Elected
Oregon	Andrew Stolfi	Commissioner	Oregon Insurance Division	Appointed
Pennsylvania	Michael Humphreys	Commissioner	Pennsylvania Insurance Department	Appointed
Puerto Rico	Alexander S. Adams Vega	Commissioner	Office of the Commissioner of Insurance	Appointed
Rhode Island	Elizabeth Kelleher Dwyer	Superintendent	Rhode Island Division of Insurance	Appointed
South Carolina	Michael Wise	Director	South Carolina Department of Insurance	Appointed
South Dakota	Larry Deiter	Director	South Dakota Division of Insurance	Appointed
Tennessee	Carter Lawrence	Commissioner	Tennessee Department of Commerce and Insurance	Appointed
Texas	Amanda Crawford	Commissioner	Texas Department of Insurance	Appointed
Utah	Joanathan Pike	Commissioner	Utah Insurance Department	Appointed
U.S. Virgin Islands	Tregenza Roach	Lt. Governor/ Commissioner	Division of Banking and Insurance	Elected
Vermont	Sandy Bigglestone	Commissioner	Vermont Department of Financial Regulation	Appointed
Virginia	Scott A. White	Commissioner	Virginia Bureau of Insurance	Appointed
Washington	Mike Kreidler	Commissioner	Washington Office of the Insurance Commissioner	Elected
West Virginia	Alan L. McVey	Commissioner	West Virginia Offices of the Insurance Commissioner	Appointed
Wisconsin	Nathan Houdek	Commissioner	Wisconsin Office of the Commissioner of Insurance	Appointed
Wyoming	Jeff Rude	Commissioner	Wyoming Insurance Department	Appointed
