= Tangipahoa Parish, Louisiana =

Parish in Louisiana, United States

- Parish
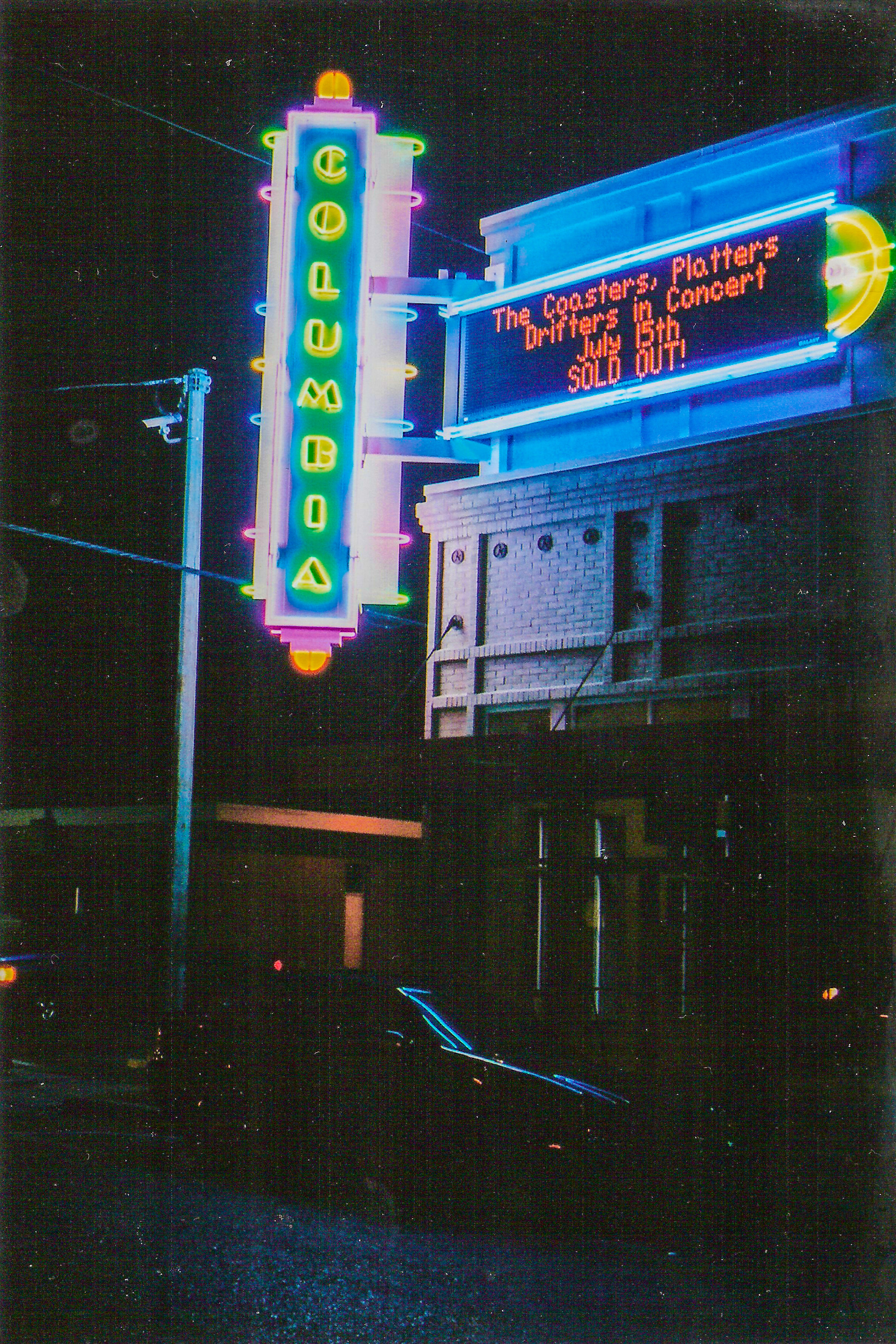
- Columbia Theatre for the Performing Arts in Hammond

- Seal Logo

- Location within the U.S. state of Louisiana
- Coordinates: 30°37′36″N 90°24′20″W
- Country: United States
- State: Louisiana
- Founded: March 6, 1869
- Named for: Acolapissa word meaning ear of corn or those who gather corn
- Seat: Amite City
- Largest city: Hammond

Area
  - Total: 823 sq mi (2,130 km^{2})
  - Land: 791 sq mi (2,050 km^{2})
  - Water: 32 sq mi (83 km^{2}) 3.9%

Population (2020)
  - Total: 133,157
  - Estimate (2025): 141,346 ▲
  - Density: 168/sq mi (65.0/km^{2})
- Time zone: UTC−6 (Central)
  - Summer (DST): UTC−5 (CDT)
- Congressional districts: 1st, 5th
- Website: www.tangipahoa.org

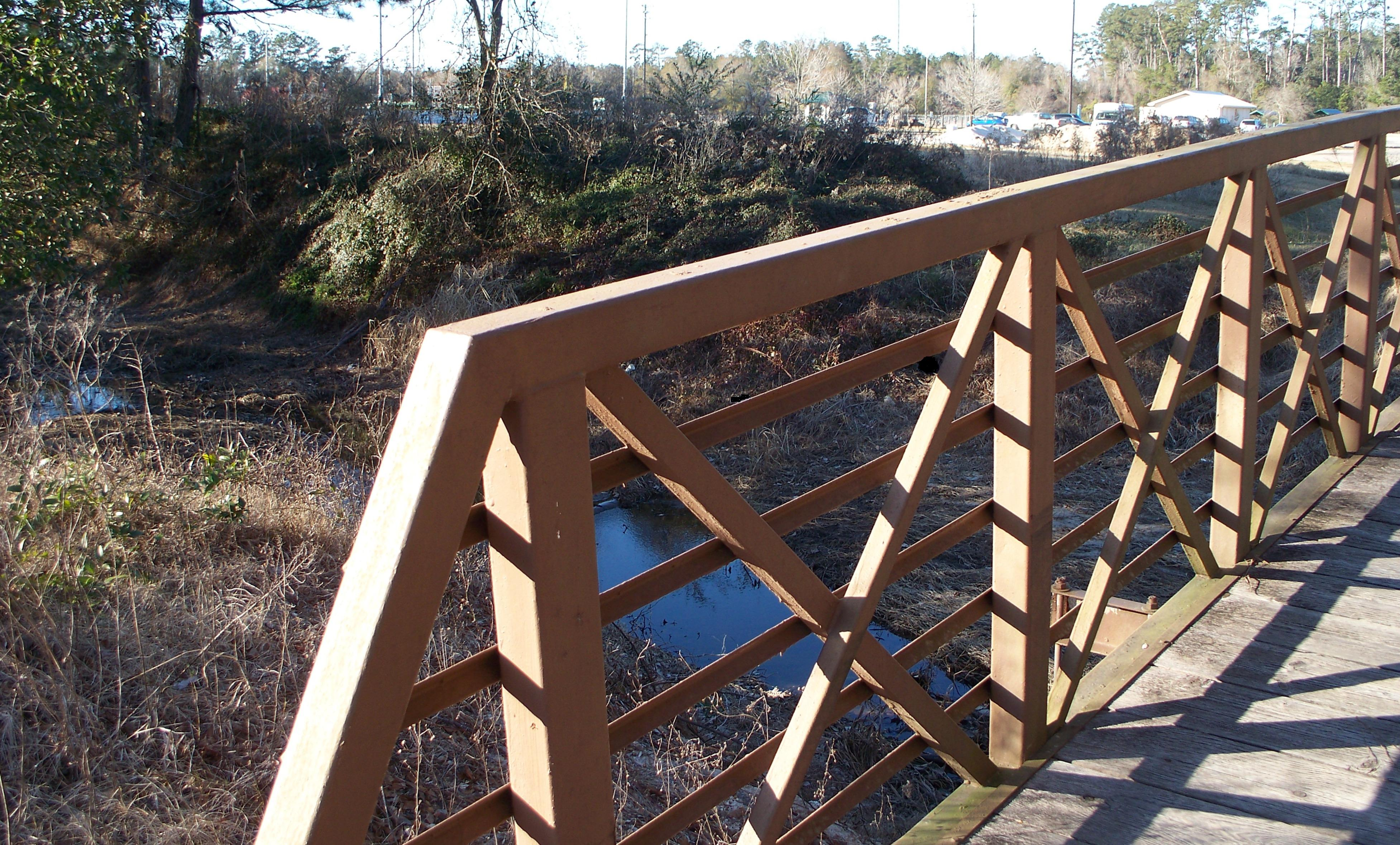
Footbridge across a tributary of Ponchatoula Creek leading to North Oak Street Park on the campus of Southeastern Louisiana University in Hammond, Tangipahoa Parish

Tangipahoa Parish ( /ˌtændʒɪpəˈhoʊə/) is a parish located on the southeastern border of the U.S. state of Louisiana. As of the 2020 census, the population was 133,157. The parish seat is Amite City, while the largest city is Hammond. Southeastern Louisiana University is located in Hammond. Lake Pontchartrain borders the southeastern side of the parish.

The name Tangipahoa comes from an Acolapissa word meaning "ear of corn" or "those who gather corn." The parish was organized in 1869 during the Reconstruction era.

Tangipahoa Parish comprises the Hammond, LA metropolitan statistical area, which is also included in the Baton Rouge–Hammond, LA combined statistical area. It is one of what are called the Florida Parishes, at one time part of West Florida.

== History ==
Tangipahoa Parish was created by Louisiana Act 85 on March 6, 1869, during the Reconstruction era. The parish was assembled from territories taken from Livingston Parish, St. Helena Parish, St. Tammany Parish, and Washington Parish. It was named after the Tangipahoa River and the historic Tangipahoa Native American people of this area. Tangipahoa is the youngest parish in the Florida Parishes region of southern Louisiana.

Parts of this area had already been developed for sugar cane plantations when the parish was organized, and that industry depended on numerous African American laborers who were freedmen after the war. Mostly white yeomen farmers occupied areas in the piney woods and resisted planters' attempts at political dominance. African Americans comprised about one-quarter of the population overall in the Florida Parishes before the war but were prevalent in the plantation areas, where they had been enslaved laborers.

The region developed rapidly during and after Reconstruction. Both physical and political conflicts arose in Tangipahoa Parish among interests related to construction of railroads, exploitation of timber, yeoman farmers in the piney woods keeping truck farms, and the beginning of manufacturing.

Sugar cane had depended on the labor of large gangs of enslaved African Americans before the Civil War. After the war and emancipation, some freedmen stayed to work on the plantations as laborers. Others moved to New Orleans and other cities, seeking different work. This area had rapid development and received a high rate of immigrants and migrants from other areas of the country. Through the turn of the twentieth century, the eastern Florida Parishes had the most white mob violence and highest rate of lynchings (primarily of black men) in southern Louisiana.

Especially after Reconstruction, whites helped black communities with flowers and food. Piney woods whites resisted the planters' efforts to restore their political power, but imposed their own brutal violence on freedmen.

Tangipahoa Parish became more socially volatile by a "pronounced in-migration" of northerners (from the Midwest) and Sicilian immigrants, coupled with "industrial development along the Illinois Central Railroad, and crippling political factionalism."

During the period of 1877–1950, a total of 24 Black people were lynched in the parish as a means of racial terrorism and intimidation. This was the sixth highest total of any parish in Louisiana and the highest number of any parish in southern Louisiana. Twenty-two of these murders took place from 1879 to 1919, a time of heightened violence in the state. Unlike some other parishes, Tangipahoa did not have a high rate of legal executions of blacks; the whites operated outside the justice system altogether. Among those lynched and hanged by a mob was Emma Hooper, a black woman who had shot and wounded a constable.

In 1898 the Louisiana state legislature disenfranchised most African-Americans by raising barriers to voter registration. They effectively excluded blacks from politics for decades, until after passage and enforcement of federal civil rights legislation.

In the first half of the 20th century, many African Americans left Tangipahoa Parish to escape the racial violence and oppression of Jim Crow, moving to industrial cities in the Great Migration. Especially during and after World War II, they moved to the West Coast, where the buildup of the defense industry opened up new jobs. In the 21st century, blacks constitute a minority in the parish.

Timber, agriculture and industry are still important to the parish. It suffered flooding in 1932 and in the early 1980s. In 2016, Tangipahoa was one of many parishes declared a Federal disaster area due to historic flooding from rainfall and storms in both March and August.

== Geography ==
According to the U.S. Census Bureau, the parish has a total area of 823 square miles (2,130 km^{2}), of which 791 square miles (2,050 km^{2}) is land and 32 square miles (83 km^{2}) (3.9%) is water. Lake Pontchartrain lies on the southeast side of the parish.

Most of the parish south of Ponchatoula consists of Holocene coastal swamp and marsh—gray-to-black clays of high organic content and thick peat beds underlying freshwater marsh and swamp.

== Communities ==
=== Cities ===
- Hammond (largest municipality)
- Ponchatoula

=== Towns ===
- Amite City (parish seat)
- Independence
- Kentwood
- Roseland

=== Villages ===
- Tangipahoa
- Tickfaw

=== Census-designated place ===
- Natalbany

=== Other unincorporated places ===
- Baptist
- Fluker
- Husser
- Loranger
- Manchac (Akers)
- Pumpkin Center
- Robert
- Rosaryville
- Wilmer

== Demographics ==
Historical population
Census	Pop.	Note	%±
1870	7,928		—
1880	9,638		21.6%
1890	12,655		31.3%
1900	17,625		39.3%
1910	29,160		65.4%
1920	31,440		7.8%
1930	46,227		47.0%
1940	45,519		−1.5%
1950	53,218		16.9%
1960	59,434		11.7%
1970	65,875		10.8%
1980	80,698		22.5%
1990	85,709		6.2%
2000	100,588		17.4%
2010	121,097		20.4%
2020	133,157		10.0%
2025 (est.)	141,346	▲	6.1%
U.S. Decennial Census; 1790-1960 1900-1990; 1990-2000 2010

Tangipahoa Parish, Louisiana – Racial and ethnic composition Note: the US Census treats Hispanic/Latino as an ethnic category. This table excludes Latinos from the racial categories and assigns them to a separate category. Hispanics/Latinos may be of any race.
Race / Ethnicity (NH = Non-Hispanic)	Pop 1980	Pop 1990	Pop 2000	Pop 2010	Pop 2020	% 1980	% 1990	% 2000	% 2010	% 2020
White alone (NH)	55,375	59,895	69,300	77,807	79,825	68.62%	69.88%	68.89%	64.25%	59.95%
Black or African American alone (NH)	23,945	24,446	28,388	36,485	39,770	29.67%	28.52%	28.22%	30.13%	29.87%
Native American or Alaska Native alone (NH)	84	175	222	355	409	0.10%	0.20%	0.22%	0.29%	0.31%
Asian alone (NH)	141	232	387	714	942	0.17%	0.27%	0.38%	0.59%	0.71%
Native Hawaiian or Pacific Islander alone (NH)	x	x	5	35	23	x	x	0.00%	0.03%	0.02%
Other race alone (NH)	99	10	62	108	376	0.12%	0.01%	0.06%	0.09%	0.28%
Mixed race or Multiracial (NH)	x	x	688	1,333	4,570	x	x	0.68%	1.10%	3.43%
Hispanic or Latino (any race)	1,054	951	1,536	4,260	7,242	1.31%	1.11%	1.53%	3.52%	5.44%
Total	80,698	85,709	100,588	121,097	133,157	100.00%	100.00%	100.00%	100.00%	100.00%

As of the 2020 census, the parish had a population of 133,157. The median age was 36.6 years. 23.8% of residents were under the age of 18 and 15.7% of residents were 65 years of age or older. For every 100 females there were 94.2 males, and for every 100 females age 18 and over there were 91.3 males age 18 and over.

The racial makeup of the parish was 61.1% White, 30.1% Black or African American, 0.4% American Indian and Alaska Native, 0.8% Asian, <0.1% Native Hawaiian and Pacific Islander, 2.2% from some other race, and 5.4% from two or more races. Hispanic or Latino residents of any race comprised 5.4% of the population.

54.0% of residents lived in urban areas, while 46.0% lived in rural areas.

There were 50,961 households in the parish, of which 32.5% had children under the age of 18 living in them. Of all households, 42.2% were married-couple households, 19.8% were households with a male householder and no spouse or partner present, and 30.5% were households with a female householder and no spouse or partner present. About 27.2% of all households were made up of individuals and 10.3% had someone living alone who was 65 years of age or older.

There were 56,685 housing units, of which 10.1% were vacant. Among occupied housing units, 69.1% were owner-occupied and 30.9% were renter-occupied. The homeowner vacancy rate was 1.5% and the rental vacancy rate was 10.3%.

== Government and politics ==
The parish is part of both Louisiana's 1st congressional district and Louisiana's 5th congressional district. Since the late 20th century most of the conservative, white-majority voters have left the Democratic Party and shifted to the Republican Party. African Americans have largely continued to support the Democratic Party and its candidates.

The parish government is governed by the Louisiana State Constitution and the Tangipahoa Parish Home Rule Charter. The Parish Government of Tangipahoa is headed by a parish president and a parish council (president-council government). The council is the legislative body of the parish, with authority under Louisiana State Constitution, the Parish Home Rule Charter, and laws passed by the Louisiana State Legislature. The Parish Sheriff is the chief law enforcement officer; other elected officers include the coroner, assessor, and clerk of court.

Keith Bardwell, justice of the peace for the parish's 8th ward (Robert, Louisiana), attracted attention in October 2009 for refusing to officiate the wedding of an interracial couple. Bardwell, a justice of the peace for 34 years, had concluded that "most black society does not readily accept offspring of such relationships, and neither does white society". He said he does not perform weddings for interracial marriages because "I don't want to put children in a situation they didn't bring on themselves." Bardwell said he had refused to perform the weddings of four couples during the 2½-year period before the news of his actions was publicized, resigned effective November 3, 2009. Governor Bobby Jindal said that the resignation was "long overdue."

Despite the parish's Republican leanings, the parish is also the home of Democratic Governor John Bel Edwards. Edwards won over 60% of the parish vote in 2015 and carried the parish again in 2019, outperforming Democratic presidential candidates by over 30 points in both elections.

=== Parish Council ===
Tangipahoa Parish is governed by an elected ten-member Council, each representing a geographic district and roughly equal populations. As of October 2016 its chairman was Bobby Cortez. Kristen Pecararo is the clerk of the council.

=== President of Tangipahoa Parish ===
In 1986, the former governing body of Tangipahoa Parish, the Tangipahoa Police Jury, and the voters of the Parish approved a "home rule charter" style of government. The charter provided for the election of a parish president, essentially a parish-wide mayor. Democrat Gordon A. Burgess was elected to an initial one-year term and re-elected the following year for a four-year term. Burgess was repeatedly re-elected as parish president until he retired in 2015.

In 2016, Republican businessman Robert "Robby" Miller succeeded Burgess. In April 2016, the Parish hired its first chief administrative officer, Shelby "Joe" Thomas, Jr. to handle operating functions.

President	Terms of Office	Party
Gordon Burgess	October 27, 1986 – January 11, 2016	Democratic
Robby Miller	January 11, 2016 – incumbent	Republican

United States presidential election results for Tangipahoa Parish, Louisiana
Year	Republican		Democratic		Third party(ies)	
Year	No.	%	No.	%	No.	%
1912	40	3.02%	1,061	80.02%	225	16.97%
1916	159	10.62%	1,326	88.58%	12	0.80%
1920	440	22.67%	1,501	77.33%	0	0.00%
1924	479	22.76%	1,626	77.24%	0	0.00%
1928	1,415	33.30%	2,834	66.70%	0	0.00%
1932	455	9.36%	4,404	90.58%	3	0.06%
1936	1,374	22.90%	4,624	77.07%	2	0.03%
1940	1,284	17.87%	5,900	82.09%	3	0.04%
1944	1,572	26.24%	4,419	73.76%	0	0.00%
1948	1,287	17.37%	2,184	29.48%	3,937	53.15%
1952	5,166	46.90%	5,850	53.10%	0	0.00%
1956	5,788	51.75%	4,831	43.19%	566	5.06%
1960	3,285	22.89%	6,648	46.32%	4,418	30.79%
1964	9,732	57.79%	7,109	42.21%	0	0.00%
1968	2,907	13.86%	4,983	23.75%	13,088	62.39%
1972	11,607	62.89%	5,227	28.32%	1,623	8.79%
1976	9,242	38.02%	14,432	59.36%	637	2.62%
1980	15,187	48.46%	15,272	48.73%	883	2.82%
1984	19,580	60.10%	12,799	39.29%	200	0.61%
1988	16,669	54.32%	13,527	44.08%	492	1.60%
1992	14,128	41.26%	15,194	44.37%	4,923	14.38%
1996	15,517	41.28%	18,617	49.53%	3,457	9.20%
2000	20,421	54.96%	15,843	42.64%	891	2.40%
2004	26,181	62.14%	15,345	36.42%	609	1.45%
2008	31,434	64.68%	16,438	33.82%	730	1.50%
2012	31,590	63.06%	17,722	35.37%	787	1.57%
2016	33,959	64.79%	16,878	32.20%	1,579	3.01%
2020	37,806	65.57%	18,887	32.76%	968	1.68%
2024	37,500	68.05%	16,886	30.64%	718	1.30%

=== Law enforcement ===
The Tangipahoa Parish Sheriff's Office is headquartered in Hammond. The Sheriff's office was excluded from a DEA task force in 2016 after the Justice Department charged two deputies with stealing money and drugs seized in raids.

== Education ==
The parish is served by the Tangipahoa Parish School System. Southeastern Louisiana University is located in Hammond.

On seven occasions, the American Civil Liberties Union has sued the Tangipahoa Parish School Board, along with other defendants, for having allegedly sponsored and promoted religion in teacher-led school activities.

=== Education ===
The elected school board governs and oversees the Tangipahoa Parish School System (TPSS). The Board has a long history of racial discrimination in the hiring of teachers. In 1975, it was ordered to ensure one-third of the teaching staff were Black. Both the Board and the Court ignored the mandate for more than thirty years. During the period from 1998 to 2008, the Board hired fewer Black teachers than any other school system in the state. In 2010, a second ruling strengthened the first.

== National Guard ==
The parish is home to the 204th Theater Airfield Operations Group and the Forward Support Company of the 205th Engineer Battalion. This 205th Engineer Battalion is a component of the 225th Engineer Brigade of the Louisiana National Guard. These units reside within the city of Hammond. A detachment of the 1021st Engineer Company (Vertical) resides in Independence, Louisiana. The 236th Combat Communications Squadron of the Louisiana Air National Guard also resides at the Hammond Airport.

== Transportation ==
=== Railroads ===
Amtrak's daily City of New Orleans long-distance train stops in Hammond, both northbound (to Chicago) and southbound. It serves about 15,000 riders a year, and Hammond-Chicago is the ninth-busiest city pair on the route.

The historic main line of the Illinois Central that carries freight through the parish is now part of CN. It continues to be busy.

=== Highways ===
- Interstate 12
- Interstate 55
- U.S. Route 51
  - US 51 Bus.
- U.S. Route 190
- Louisiana Highway 10
- Louisiana Highway 16
- Louisiana Highway 22
- Louisiana Highway 38
- Louisiana Highway 40
- Louisiana Highway 440
- Louisiana Highway 442
- Louisiana Highway 443
- Louisiana Highway 445
- Louisiana Highway 1040
- Louisiana Highway 1045
- Louisiana Highway 1046
- Louisiana Highway 1048
- Louisiana Highway 1049
- Louisiana Highway 1050
- Louisiana Highway 1051
- Louisiana Highway 1053
- Louisiana Highway 1054
- Louisiana Highway 1055
- Louisiana Highway 1056
- Louisiana Highway 1057
- Louisiana Highway 1058
- Louisiana Highway 1061
- Louisiana Highway 1062
- Louisiana Highway 1063
- Louisiana Highway 1064
- Louisiana Highway 1065
- Louisiana Highway 1249
- Louisiana Highway 3158
- Louisiana Highway 3234

== Notable people ==
- Robert Alford, professional football player, Atlanta Falcons, Arizona Cardinals
- Chris Broadwater, former District 86 state representative, resides in Hammond
- Nick Bruno, president of University of Louisiana at Monroe
- Hodding Carter, 20th-century journalist
- John L. Crain, president of Southeastern Louisiana University
- Donald Dykes, former professional football player, New York Jets and San Diego Chargers
- John Bel Edwards, former Governor of Louisiana; former Minority Leader of Louisiana House of Representatives; former District 72 state representative, resides in Amite
- C. B. Forgotston, political activist
- Barbara Forrest, critic of intelligent design
- Tim Gautreaux, writer
- Kevin Hughes, former professional football player, St. Louis Rams and Carolina Panthers
- Bolivar E. Kemp, U.S. representative, 1925–1933
- Bolivar Edwards Kemp, Jr., Louisiana Attorney General, 1948–1952
- Wade Miley, professional baseball pitcher
- Harlan Miller, professional football player, Arizona Cardinals, Washington Redskins
- James H. Morrison, represented Louisiana's 6th congressional district from 1943 to 1967
- Kim Mulkey, college basketball player, United States Olympic Team, LSU head women's basketball coach
- Rufus Porter, former professional football player
- Billy Reid, fashion designer
- Weldon Russell, former state representative from Tangipahoa and St. Helena parishes
- Britney Spears, entertainer
- DeVonta Smith, professional football player, Philadelphia Eagles, 2020 Heisman Trophy Winner, Alabama Crimson Tide football
- Jackie Smith, former professional football player, St. Louis Cardinals and Dallas Cowboys, NFL Hall of Famer
- Irma Thomas, Grammy Award-winning singer
- LaBrandon Toefield, former professional football player, Jacksonville Jaguars and Carolina Panthers
- Earl Wilson, former major league baseball player for Boston Red Sox, Detroit Tigers and San Diego Padres
- Harry D. Wilson, Louisiana state representative and state agriculture commissioner; pushed for the establishment of the town of Independence in 1912
- Justin Wilson, chef and humorist

== See also ==
- National Register of Historic Places listings in Tangipahoa Parish, Louisiana
- Tangipahoa Parish Sheriff's Office
