= Louisiana Department of Agriculture and Forestry =

State agency of Louisiana, U.S.

The Louisiana Department of Agriculture and Forestry (LDAF) is a state agency of Louisiana, headquartered in Baton Rouge. The department is responsible for promoting, protecting and advancing agriculture and forestry, and soil and water resources.

The department is under the supervision of the Commissioner of Agriculture and Forestry. The current Commissioner is Dr. Michael G. Strain, a Republican veterinarian first elected in 2007.

Strain's Democratic predecessors as agriculture commissioner include:

- Harry D. Wilson (1916 – January 1948)
- Millard Perkins (1948 interim)
- W. E. Anderson (1948–1952)
- Dave L. Pearce (1952–1956)
- Sidney McCrory (1956–1960)
- Dave L. Pearce (1960–1976)
- Gil Dozier (1976–1980)
- Bob Odom (1980–2008)

== Organization ==
The department is under the control of the Commissioner of Agriculture and Forestry, who is elected statewide. The Commissioner is assisted by a Deputy Commissioner, Confidential Assistant, and six Assistant Commissioners.

- Commissioner of Agriculture and Forestry
  - Deputy Commissioner
  - Confidential Assistant
    - Assistant Commissioner
      - Office of Agricultural and Environmental Science
        - Agricultural Chemistry Programs Division
        - Horticulture and Quarantine Programs Division
        - Pesticide and Environmental Programs Division
        - Seed Programs Division
    - Assistant Commissioner
      - Office of Agro-Consumer Services
        - Agricultural Commodities Commission
        - Dairy Division
        - Weights and Measures Division
    - Assistant Commissioner / State Veterinarian
      - Office of Animal Health and Food Safety Services
        - Veterinary Health Division
        - Food Quality Services Division
        - Investigative Services Division
    - Assistant Commissioner / State Forester
      - Office of Forestry
        - Forest Management Division
        - Forest Protection Division
        - Forestry Enforcement Division
        - Reforestation Division
    - Assistant Commissioner
      - Office of Management and Finance
    - Assistant Commissioner
      - Office of Soil and Water Conservation
        - Conservation District Services Division
        - Agricultural Solid Waste Management Division
        - Agricultural Nonpoint Source Pollution Abatement Division
        - Coastal Wetlands Re-vegetation Division
        - Conservation Information and Education Division
        - Conservation Reserve Enhancement Program Division
        - Farm Bill Program Assistance Division

Purpose

The purpose of the Louisiana Department of Agriculture and Forestry is to provide guidance to not only the agricultural industry, but the general population of Louisiana.
