= Edward M. Carmouche =

American lawyer

Edward Moss Carmouche, Sr.

Chairman, Louisiana Democratic Party
- In office December 1966 – December 1967
- Preceded by: C. H. "Sammy" Downs
- Succeeded by: Arthur C. Watson

Personal details
- Born: Edward Moss Carmouche; June 21, 1921 Lake Charles, Louisiana, US
- Died: April 6, 1990 (aged 68) Lake Charles, Louisiana, US
- Resting place: Sallier Cemetery in Lake Charles
- Spouse: Virginia Lanier Martin Carmouche
- Children: Edward M. Carmouche, Jr. Maura Monnot Carmouche; Virginia Lanier Carmouche Pierre August Carmouche
- Education: Louisiana State University University of Virginia Law School Tulane University Law School
- Occupation: Attorney

Military service
- Branch/service: United States Army
- Battles/wars: European Theater of Operations of World War II

Edward Moss Carmouche Sr. (June 21, 1921 – April 6, 1990), was an attorney in his native Lake Charles, Louisiana, who during the 1960s was a leader of the nationalist faction of the Louisiana Democratic Party.

== Background ==
Carmouche was the eldest child of Paul Frederick Carmouche (1899-1971) and the former Alice Anne Moss (1899-1996). In 1943, he received his undergraduate degree from Louisiana State University in Baton Rouge and entered the United States Army during World War II, in which he served as a captain in the European Theater of Operations. He received three Bronze Star medals, the Silver Star, the French Croix de Guerre, and the Medaille de la Reconnaissance.

In 1948, Carmouche received the Juris Doctor degree from the University of Virginia Law School in Charlottesville, Virginia. In 1949, he received a Master of Civil Law degree from the Roman Catholic-affiliated Tulane University Law School. In addition to his Carmouche, Martin and Wilson law firm in Lake Charles, he held the presidency of the Lutcher Moore Development Corporation and was as managing partner of Lutcher and Moore Cypress Lumber Company. Carmouche also had law offices in Washington, D.C., Lafayette, New Orleans, and Baton Rouge. At the time of his death, he was the chairman of the board of the Carmouche and Gray law firm.

== Legal and political career ==
From 1952 to 1955, Carmouche was a magistrate judge for the United States District Court for the Western District of Louisiana. He was from 1955 to 1984 an assistant state attorney general under Fred S. LeBlanc, Jack P. F. Gremillion, and William J. Guste. Carmouche was a delegate to both the 1956 and 1960 Democratic national conventions. In 1960, Carmouche served on the party platform committee and was a successful elector candidate for the Kennedy-Johnson ticket, which easily won the ten electoral votes in Louisiana.

In December 1966, Carmouche was elected state party chairman when C. H. "Sammy" Downs, a former member of both houses of the Louisiana State Legislature from Alexandria, resigned to support George Wallace, who as the former governor of Alabama mounted a presidential campaign in 1968 as the nominee of the American Independent Party. As an avowed supporter of U.S. President Lyndon B. Johnson, Carmouche defeated, fifty-four to thirty-eight, the mayor of Monroe, W. L. "Jack" Howard, who carried the support of both Downs and Leander Perez, the political boss of Plaquemines Parish near New Orleans known for his strong segregationist views.

Carmouche was subsequently replaced on December 28, 1967, by Arthur C. Watson, an attorney and a former state representative from Natchitoches.

== Death ==
Carmouche was Presbyterian. He was married to the former Virginia Lanier Martin, who was born in 1923 in Thibodaux, Louisiana. Virginia Carmouche is also an attorney.

The Carmouches had five children. Carmouche died at the age of sixty-eight in Lake Charles.

In 1986, Edward and Virginia Carmouche co-authored the book Kindred, about their Carmouche, Lanier, and Martin families. In 1992, Virginia Carmouche wrote The Life of Edward M. Carmouche, a biography of her husband.

Preceded by C. H. "Sammy" Downs	Chairman of the Louisiana Democratic Party; 1966–1968	Succeeded by Arthur C. Watson
