= 2015 Louisiana elections =

U.S. state government election

A general election was held in the U.S. state of Louisiana on October 24, 2015. All of Louisiana's executive officers, in addition to both houses of the Louisiana State Legislature were up for election. Under Louisiana's jungle primary system, all candidates appeared on the same ballot, regardless of party, and voters voted for any candidate, regardless of their party affiliation. Since no candidate received a majority of the vote during the primary election, a runoff election was held on November 21, 2015, between the top two candidates in the primary. Louisiana is the only state that has a jungle primary system (California and Washington have a similar "top two primary" system).

== Governor ==
Incumbent Republican Governor Bobby Jindal was term-limited and unable to run for re-election to a third term in office.

== Lieutenant governor ==
Incumbent Republican Lieutenant Governor Jay Dardenne did not run for re-election to a second full term in office. He instead ran for governor.

== Attorney general ==
Incumbent Republican Attorney General Buddy Caldwell ran for re-election to a third term in office, but was defeated by Jeff Landry.

== Secretary of State ==
Results by parish Schedler: 50–60%; 60–70%; 70–80%; 80–90%; Tyson: 50–60%; 70–80%

Incumbent Republican Secretary of State Tom Schedler won re-election to a second full term in office.

Chris Tyson, a law professor at the Paul M. Hebert Law Center at the Louisiana State University and son of former Judge Ralph E. Tyson of the United States District Court for the Middle District of Louisiana, ran for the Democrats.

== State Treasurer ==
2015 Louisiana State Treasurer election
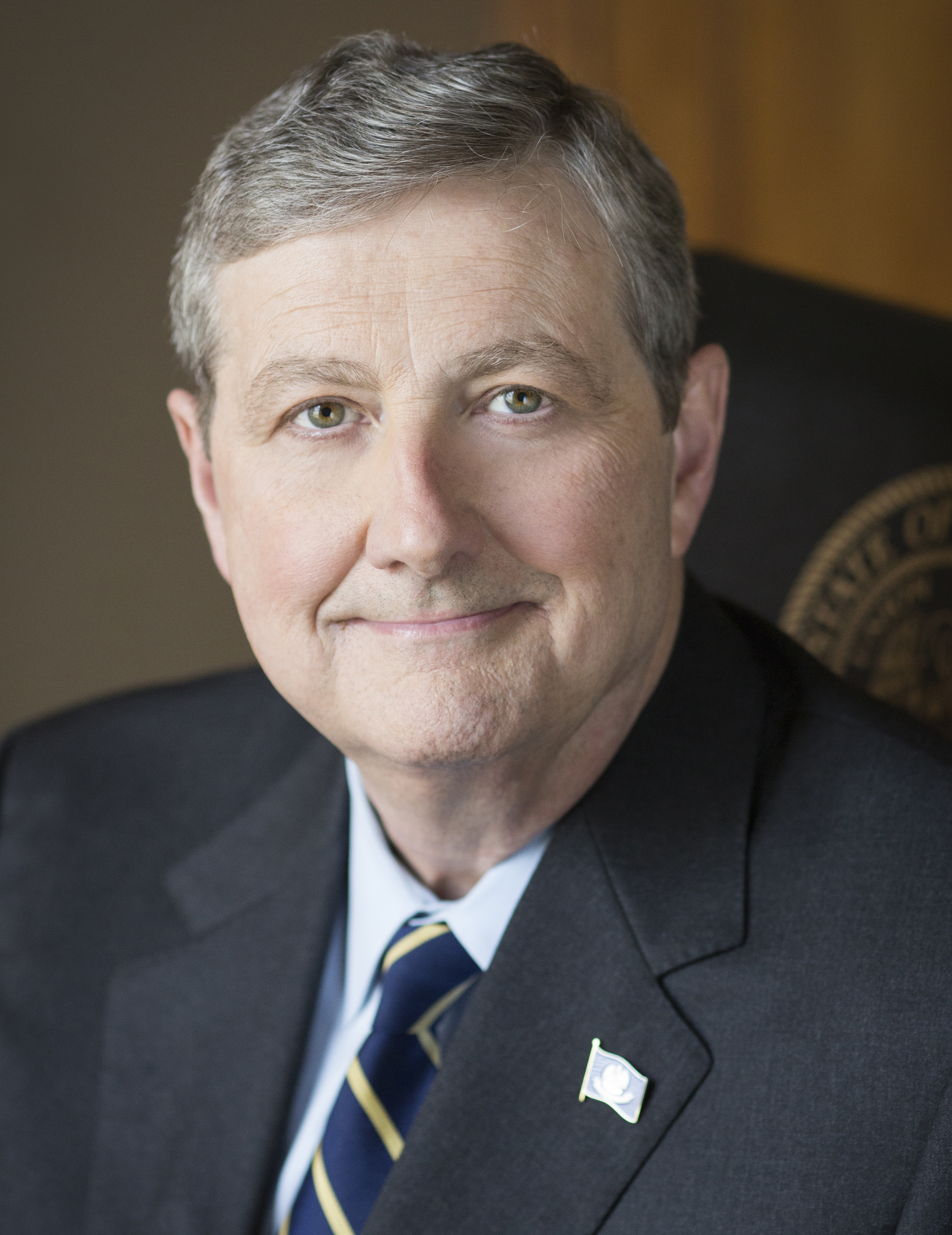

Nominee	John Kennedy	Jennifer Treadway
Party	Republican	Republican
Popular vote	787,677	195,791
Percentage	80.1%	19.9%
- Parish results Kennedy: 70–80% 80–90%
State Treasurer before election
John Kennedy
Republican
Elected State Treasurer
John Kennedy
Republican

Incumbent Republican State Treasurer John Kennedy won re-election to a fifth term in office. Republican Jennifer Treadway, a lawyer from Baton Rouge, challenged him.

Had Kennedy not chosen run for re-election, potential Republican candidates included Speaker of the Louisiana House of Representatives Chuck Kleckley; Dan Kyle, former Louisiana Legislative Auditor, candidate for Louisiana Insurance Commissioner in 2003 and candidate for Mayor-President of East Baton Rouge Parish in 2008; Jude Melville, President and CEO of Business First Bank and nephew of former Governor of Louisiana Buddy Roemer; Tony Perkins, President of the Family Research Council, former state representative and candidate for the U.S. Senate in 2002; John Schroder, state representative; and Jim Tucker, former Speaker of the Louisiana House of Representatives and candidate for Secretary of State of Louisiana in 2011. Kennedy would resign in 2017 following his election to the United States Senate.

== Commissioner of Agriculture and Forestry ==
Results by parish Strain: 40–50%; 50–60%; 60–70%; 70–80%; Greer: 40–50%; 50–60%

Incumbent Republican Commissioner of Agriculture and Forestry Michael G. Strain won re-election to a third term in office.

Democrat Jamie LaBranche, an arborist and horticulturist who lost in the jungle primary in 2011, ran for the office again.

== Commissioner of Insurance ==
Results by parish Donelon: 20–30%; 30–40%; 40–50%; 50–60%; 60–70%

Incumbent Republican Commissioner of Insurance Jim Donelon won re-election to a third full term in office.

=== Polling ===
Poll source	Date(s) administered	Sample size	Margin of error	Jim Donelon (R)	Matt Parker (R)	Undecided
Triumph	March 5, 2015	1,655	± 2.4%	45%	13%	41%

== Louisiana State Senate ==
All 39 seats in the Louisiana State Senate were up for election. The Republican Party currently holds 26 seats, while the Democratic Party holds the remaining 13. 7 of the current senators are term limited and could not run for re-election.

== Louisiana House of Representatives ==
All 105 seats in the Louisiana House of Representatives were up for election. The Republican Party currently holds 58 seats and the Democratic Party 44 seats. 2 seats are held by independents and the remaining seat is vacant. 14 of the current representatives are term-limited and could not run for re-election.
