= 2015 Louisiana Attorney General election =

- October 24, 2015 (first round); November 21, 2015 (runoff)
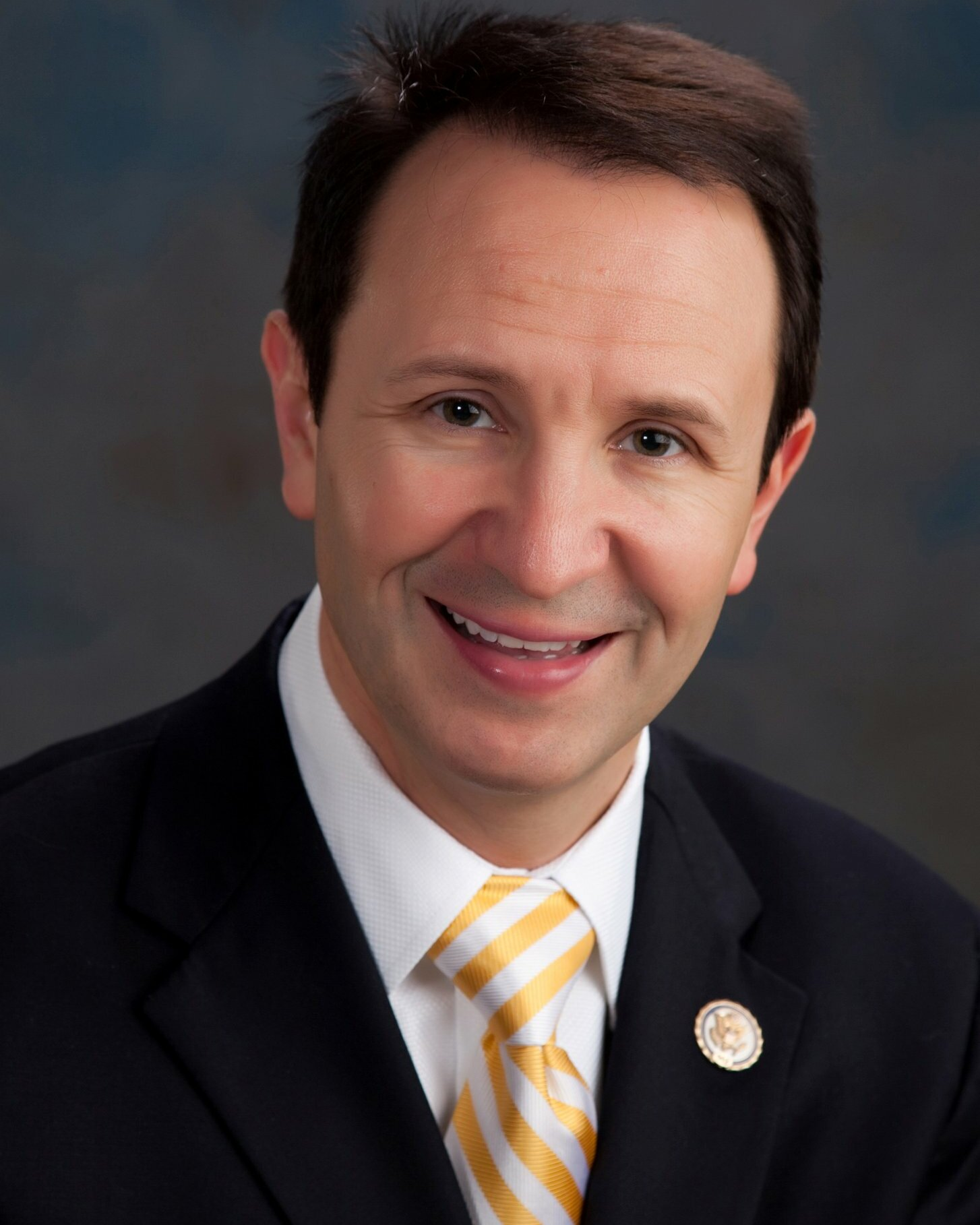

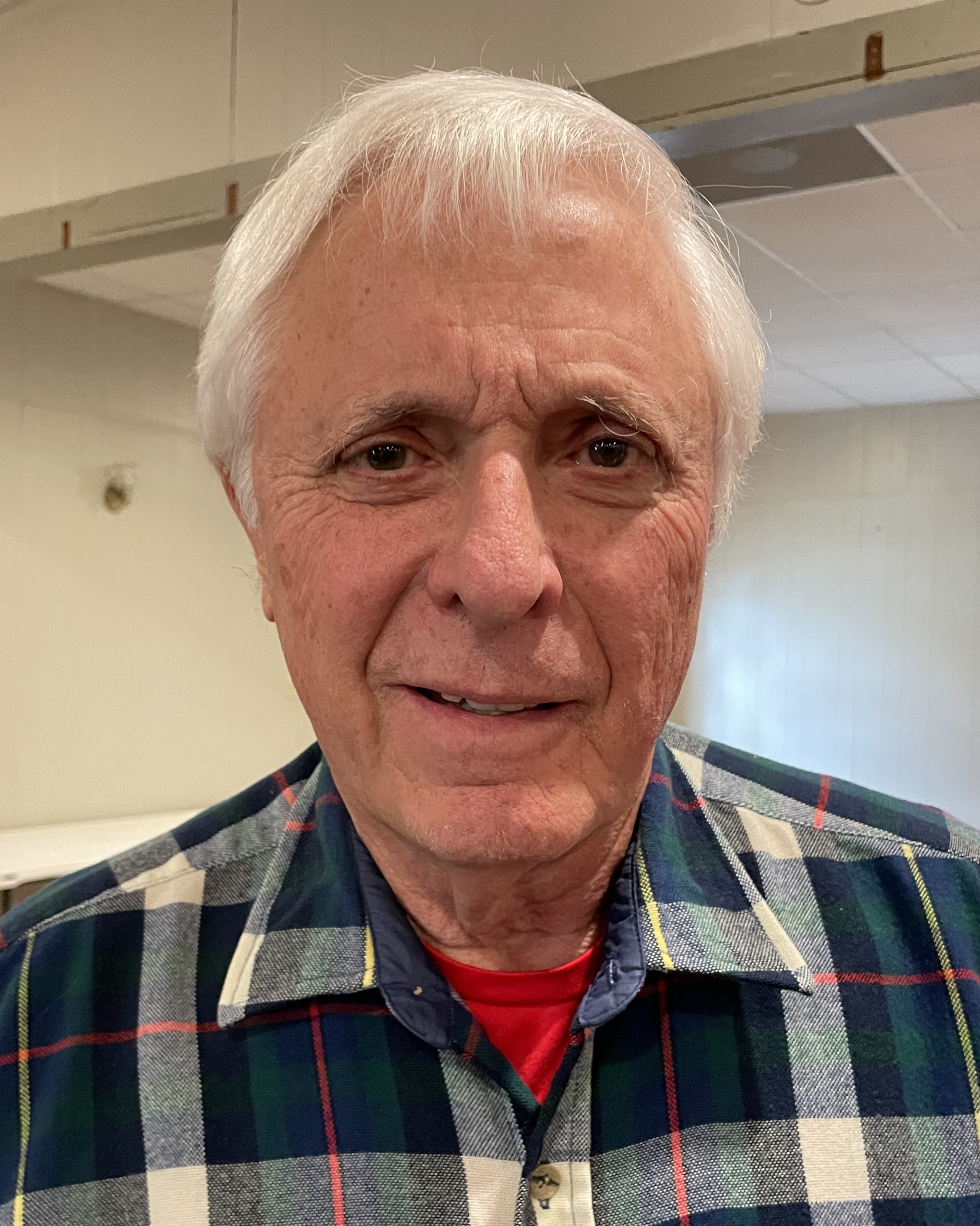
| Nominee | Jeff Landry | Buddy Caldwell |
| Party | Republican | Republican |
| First round | 347,605; 32.65% | 376,407; 35.36% |
| Runoff | 610,459; 56.3% | 505,940; 43.7% |
| Nominee | Geri Broussard Baloney | Isaac Jackson |
| Party | Democratic | Democratic |
| First round | 187,575; 17.62% | 115,188; 10.82% |
| Runoff | Eliminated | Eliminated |
- Landry: 20–30% 30–40% 40–50% 50–60% 60–70% 70–80% 80–90% Caldwell: 20–30% 30–40% 40–50% 50–60% 60–70% 70–80% 80–90% >90% Baloney: 20–30% 30–40% 40–50% 50–60% 60–70% 70–80% 80–90% >90% Jackson: 20–30% 30–40% 40–50% 50–60% 60–70% 70–80% >90% Maley: 30–40% 40–50% >90% Tie: 20–30% 30–40% 40–50% 50% No votes Landry: 20–30% 30–40% 40–50% 50–60% 60–70% 70–80% 80–90% Caldwell: 20–30% 30–40% 40–50% 50–60% 60–70% 70–80% 80–90% >90% Baloney: 20–30% 30–40% 40–50% 50–60% 60–70% 70–80% 80–90% >90% Jackson: 20–30% 30–40% 40–50% 50–60% 60–70% 70–80% >90% Maley: 30–40% 40–50% >90% Tie: 20–30% 30–40% 40–50% 50% No votes Landry: 50–60% 60–70% 70–80% 80–90% >90% Caldwell: 50–60% 60–70% 70–80% 80–90% >90% Tie: 50% No votes Landry: 50–60% 60–70% 70–80% 80–90% >90% Caldwell: 50–60% 60–70% 70–80% 80–90% >90% Tie: 50% No votes
Attorney General before election
Buddy Caldwell
Republican
Elected Attorney General
Jeff Landry
Republican

The 2015 Louisiana Attorney General election took place on October 24, 2015, to elect the Attorney General of the U.S. state of Louisiana, with a runoff election, held on November 21, 2015. Incumbent Buddy Caldwell, a former Democrat who joined the Republican Party in February 2011, sought re-election to a third term in office, but was defeated by fellow Republican Jeff Landry.

Under Louisiana's jungle primary system, all candidates will appear on the same ballot, regardless of party affiliation; voters may vote for any candidate, regardless of their own party affiliation. Since no candidate received a majority of the vote during the primary election, a runoff election was held on November 21, 2015, between Caldwell and Landry. Louisiana is the sole state that has a jungle primary system (California and Washington have a similar "top two primary" system).

== Candidates ==
=== Republican party ===
==== Filed ====
- Buddy Caldwell, incumbent attorney general
- Jeff Landry, former U.S. Representative
- Martin Maley, 18th Judicial District assistant attorney

==== Declined ====
- John Neely Kennedy, state treasurer and Democratic candidate for Attorney General in 1991 (running for re-election)
- Burton Guidry, former assistant attorney general

=== Democratic party ===
==== Filed ====
- Geraldine Broussard Baloney
- Isaac Jackson

==== Declined ====
- Rick Gallot, state senator
- Walt Leger III, Speaker pro tempore of the Louisiana House of Representatives
- Jacques Roy, mayor of Alexandria

== Jungle primary ==
=== Predictions ===
| Source | Ranking |
|---|---|
| Governing | Safe R |

=== Polling ===
| Poll source | Date(s) administered | Sample size | Margin of error | Buddy Caldwell (R) | John Kennedy (R) | Jeff Landry (R) | Jacques Roy (D) | Undecided |
|---|---|---|---|---|---|---|---|---|
| Triumph | March 5, 2015 | 1,655 | ± 2.4% | 30% | — | 20% | 30% | 21% |
| NSO Research* | January 10–13, 2015 | 600 | ± 4% | 17% | 23% | 10% | 18% | 32% |

| Poll source | Date(s) administered | Sample size | Margin of error | Buddy Caldwell (R) | Jeff Landry (R) | Generic Democrat (D) | Other | Undecided |
|---|---|---|---|---|---|---|---|---|
| V/C Research | February 20–25, 2014 | 600 | ± 4% | 23% | 15% | 33% | 1% | 27% |

- * Internal poll for the John Kennedy campaign

=== Results ===
Louisiana attorney general election Jungle Primary, 2015
| Party | Candidate | Votes | % |
|---|---|---|---|
| Republican | Buddy Caldwell (incumbent) | 376,407 | 35.4 |
| Republican | Jeff Landry | 347,605 | 32.7 |
| Democratic | Geri Broussard Baloney | 187,575 | 17.6 |
| Democratic | Isaac Jackson | 115,188 | 10.8 |
| Republican | Marty Maley | 37,830 | 3.6 |
| Total votes | | 1,064,605 | 100.0 |

== Runoff ==
=== Results ===
Louisiana attorney general election runoff, 2015
| Party | Candidate | Votes | % | ±% |
|---|---|---|---|---|
| Republican | Jeff Landry | 610,459 | 56.3% | N/A |
| Republican | Buddy Caldwell (incumbent) | 473,915 | 43.7% | N/A |
| Total votes | | 1,084,374 | 100.0% | N/A |
| Republican hold | | | | |
