= 2011 Louisiana Attorney General election =

- October 22, 2011
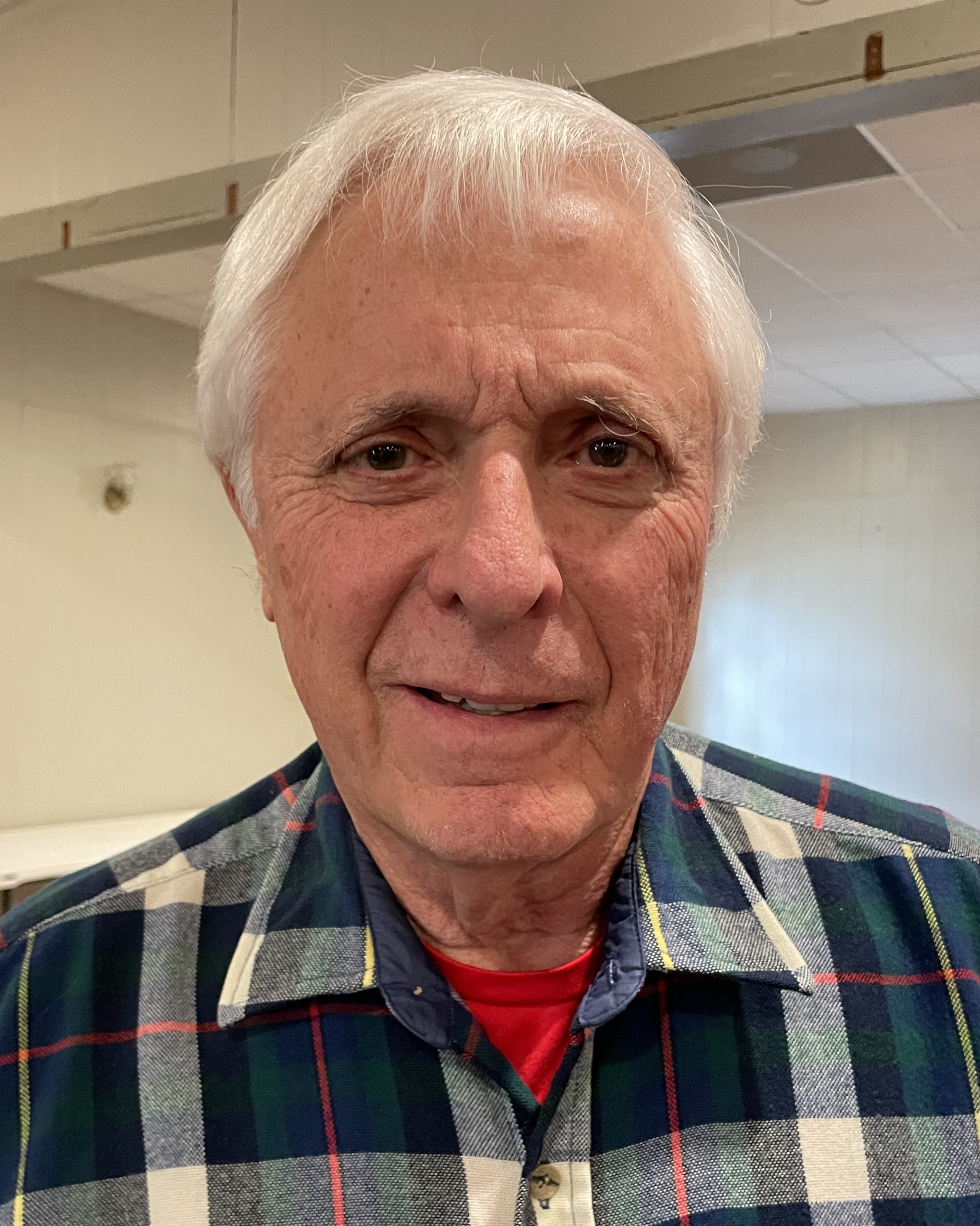
Nominee	Buddy Caldwell
Party	Republican
- Parish results Caldwell: 100%

The 2011 Louisiana Attorney General election took place on October 22, 2011, to elect the Attorney General of Louisiana, with a runoff election supposed to be held on November 19, 2011.

Incumbent Buddy Caldwell, who was elected in 2007 as a Democrat, joined the Republican Party in February 2011. He easily won re-election without opposition. His sole opponent, fellow Republican and former U.S. Representative Joseph Cao, dropped out of the race in September 2011.

== Republican candidates ==
=== Declared ===
- Buddy Caldwell, incumbent

=== Withdrew ===
- Joseph Cao, former U.S. Representative
