= 2003 Louisiana gubernatorial election =

- October 4, 2003 (first round); November 15, 2003 (runoff)
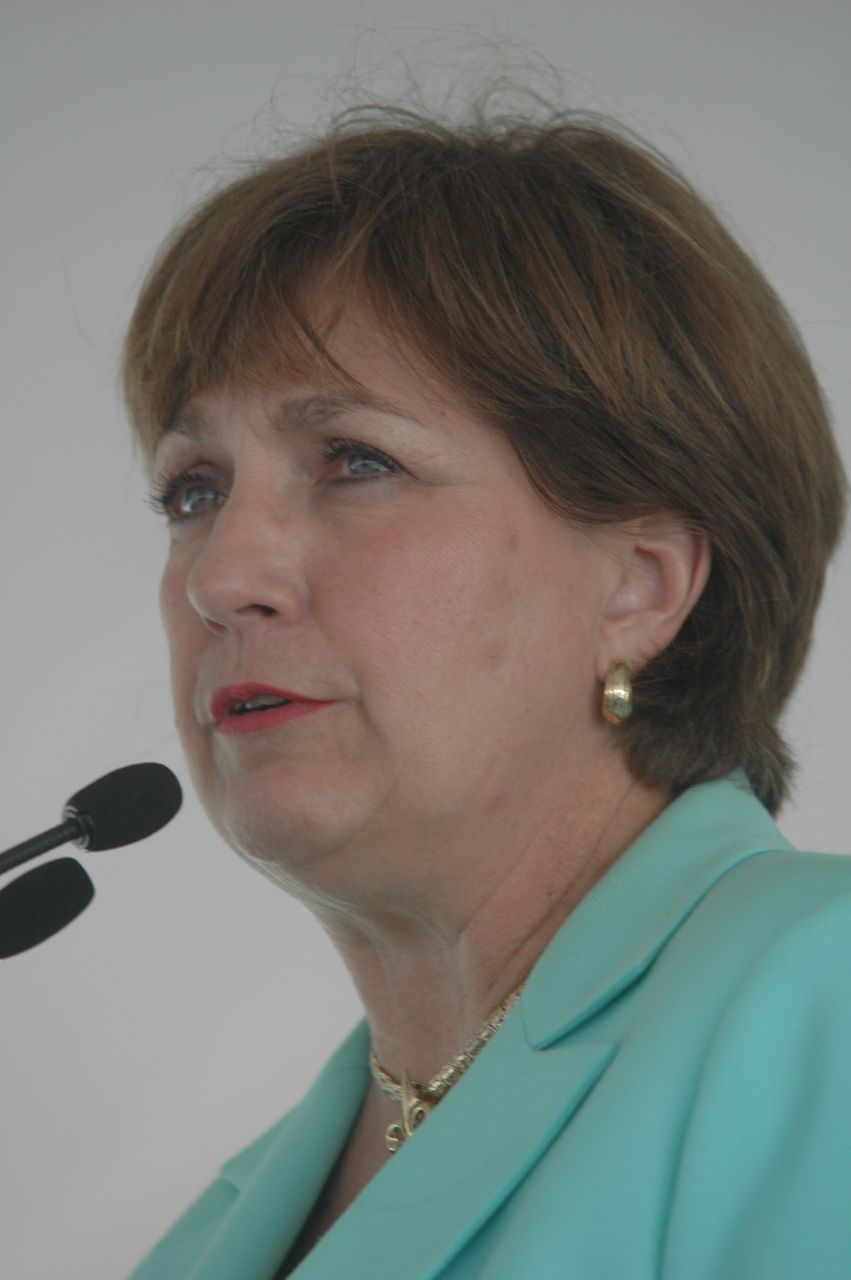

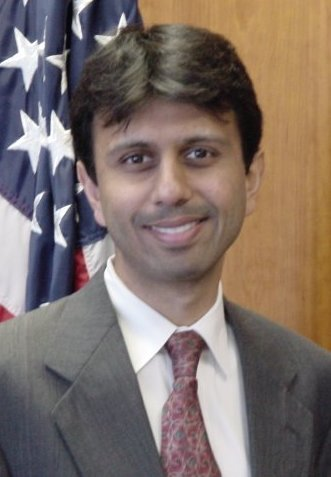

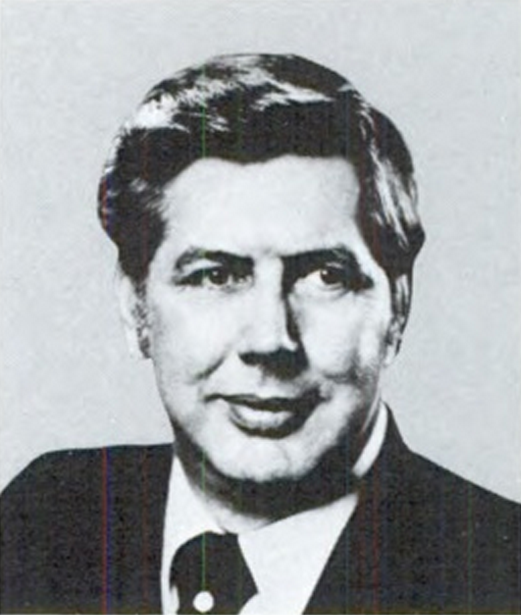

Candidate	Kathleen Blanco	Bobby Jindal	Richard Ieyoub
Party	Democratic	Republican	Democratic
First round	250,136; 18.36%	443,389; 32.54%	223,513; 16.40%
Runoff	731,358; 51.95%	676,484; 48.05%	Eliminated
Candidate	Buddy Leach	Randy Ewing	Hunt Downer
Party	Democratic	Democratic	Republican
First round	187,872; 13.79%	123,936; 9.10%	84,718; 6.22%
Runoff	Eliminated	Eliminated	Eliminated
- Blanco: 20–30% 30–40% 40–50% Jindal: 20–30% 30–40% 40–50% 50–60% Ieyoub: 20–30% 30–40% Leach: 20–30% 30–40% 50–60% Ewing: 20–30% 30–40% 40–50% 50–60% 60–70% Downer: 20–30% 40–50% Blanco: 50–60% 60–70% 70–80% Jindal: 50–60% 60–70% 70–80%
Governor before election
Mike Foster
Republican
Elected Governor
Kathleen Blanco
Democratic

The 2003 Louisiana gubernatorial election was held on November 15, to elect the governor of Louisiana. Republican incumbent Mike Foster was not eligible to run for re-election to a third term because of term limits established by the Louisiana Constitution. Democratic lieutenant governor Kathleen Blanco defeated Republican health secretary Bobby Jindal.

A first-round, top-two jungle primary was held on October 4. Jindal easily won the primary with a plurality of the vote and advanced to the runoff with the support of most Republicans in the state, while Blanco advanced in the second slot by defeating Richard Ieyoub and Buddy Leach. Blanco's victory in the primary has been credited to her support from social conservatives, women, and Acadiana.

In the runoff on November 15, Blanco defeated Jindal by approximately 55 thousand votes, or four percent of the total vote.

As of 2026, this is the most recent Louisiana gubernatorial election in which the winner of the first round did not win the runoff.

== Background ==
Departing Governor Foster was disqualified from succeeding himself for a third term by Louisiana's constitution, so the 2003 race was perceived as wide open and saw a large number of candidates enter the campaign.

Elections in Louisiana, with the exception of U.S. presidential elections, follow a variation of the open primary system called the jungle primary. Candidates of all parties are listed on one ballot; voters need not limit themselves to the candidates of one party. Unless one candidate takes more than 50 percent of the vote in the first round, a run-off election is then held between the top two candidates, who may be members of the same party. In this election, the first round of voting was held on October 4, 2003, and the runoff was held on November 15, 2003.

== Jungle primary election ==
=== Democratic Party ===
- Patrick Henry Barthel
- Kathleen Blanco, incumbent lieutenant governor of Louisiana
- Randy Ewing, former state senator from Quitman and president of the Louisiana State Senate
- Richard Ieyoub, Louisiana Attorney General
- J. E. Jumonville Jr., former state senator from Ventress
- Buddy Leach, former U.S. representative and state representative from Lake Charles
- Richard McCoy
- Fred Robertson
- Mike Stagg

=== Republican Party ===
- Allan Allgood
- Hunt Downer, Louisiana National Guard brigadier general and former speaker of the Louisiana House of Representatives
- Bobby Jindal, Louisiana Secretary of Health and Hospitals

==== Withdrew ====
- Jay Blossman, member of the Louisiana Public Service Commission (endorsed Downer)

=== Independent and third parties ===
- Quentin Brown Jr.
- J. D. Estillete
- Patrick Landry
- Edward Mangin
- John Simoneaux Jr.

=== Campaign ===
Bobby Jindal took a commanding lead among Republicans early in the campaign, leaving Hunt Downer far behind. Jindal secured the early endorsement of Mike Foster and had strong support from suburban and business-oriented Republicans, doing further outreach to rural conservatives during the course of the campaign. Downer had some institutional support from prominent Republican officials, but his campaign failed to catch on. Jay Blossman ran a provocative campaign targeting social conservatives, but after failing to gain much support, he dropped out of the race one week before the primary and endorsed Downer.

Among the large number of strong Democratic contenders, Richard Ieyoub was seen as one of the strongest Democratic candidates throughout the campaign, with endorsements from organized labor and the Louisiana Sheriffs Association and the most campaign contributions of any candidate. His campaign strategy targeted the votes of the traditional party base of labor, African-Americans, and teachers and professional groups. Former congressman Buddy Leach ran a populist campaign promising to increase the state minimum wage, teachers' salaries, and social spending, which would be funded by a new tax on oil refining and processing. By contrast, Kathleen Blanco ran as a conservative opponent of abortion, hoping to appeal to enough Republican voters to enter the runoff over her Democratic rivals.

Other Democratic candidates included former senate president Randy Ewing, who ran on a reform platform and had the endorsement of New Orleans mayor Ray Nagin, and former state senator J. E. Jumonville Jr., who ran a late, self-financed campaign on a platform calling for tax reductions and placing the Ten Commandments in the State Capitol building and all parish courthouses.

=== Predictions ===
Source	Ranking	As of
Sabato	Lean D (flip)	September 2, 2003

=== Results ===
As expected, Jindal won a strong plurality of the primary vote by consolidating support from Republicans. Ieyoub narrowly lost the second slot in the runoff to Blanco, who had a strong base of support in Acadiana and among women. Leach, who came in a close fourth, likely split the Democratic vote with Ieyoub.

Louisiana gubernatorial election jungle primary, 2003
Party	Candidate	Votes	%
Republican	Bobby Jindal	443,389	32.54%
Democratic	Kathleen Blanco	250,136	18.36%
Democratic	Richard Ieyoub	223,513	16.40%
Democratic	Claude "Buddy" Leach	187,872	13.79%
Democratic	Randy Ewing	123,936	9.10%
Republican	Hunt Downer	84,718	6.22%
Republican	Alan Allgood	7,866	0.58%
Democratic	Patrick Henry Barthel	7,338	0.54%
Other	Patrick Landry	7,195	0.53%
Other	Edward Mangin	6,745	0.49%
Other	J.D. Estillete	6,439	0.47%
Democratic	J.E. Jumonville	3,410	0.25%
Other	John Simoneaux Jr.	3,280	0.24%
Other	Quentin Brown Jr.	2,414	0.18%
Democratic	Mike Stagg	1,667	0.12%
Democratic	Richard McCoy	1,513	0.11%
Democratic	Fred Robertson	1,093	0.08%
Total votes		1,362,524	100.00%

== Runoff election ==
=== Candidates ===
- Kathleen Blanco, incumbent lieutenant governor of Louisiana (Democratic)
- Bobby Jindal, Louisiana Secretary of Health and Hospitals (Republican)

=== Campaign ===
In the runoff, Jindal received endorsements from the New Orleans Times-Picayune (the largest paper in Louisiana), New Orleans Mayor Nagin (who had supported Ewing in the primary but declined to endorse Blanco in the runoff), and outgoing Republican governor Mike Foster. Some political analysts believe that his narrow loss was partly due to racism. Other political analysts have blamed Jindal for his refusal to answer questions about his record brought up in several ads, which the Jindal campaign called "negative attack ads", the most effective of which denounced his health care plan. Still others note that a significant number of conservative Louisianans remained more comfortable voting for a conservative Democrat than for a Republican.

=== Results ===
The race was close, with Blanco prevailing by almost 4%. Blanco won a huge majority of Louisiana's parishes, however, Jindal was able to keep Blanco's margin of victory in the single digits with a strong performance in Jefferson Parish and St. Tammany Parish, plus a narrow win in East Baton Rouge Parish. It was ultimately Orleans Parish home of New Orleans that ensured a Blanco victory, though her 68.3% victory here was much smaller than Al Gore's 76% in the 2000 presidential election. This was the closest gubernatorial election since 1979, and there would not be another close gubernatorial race in Louisiana until 2019.

The victorious Blanco became Louisiana's first woman governor. She was also the second woman to have been lieutenant governor.

Louisiana gubernatorial election runoff, 2003
Party	Candidate	Votes	%
Democratic	Kathleen Blanco	731,358	51.95%
Republican	Bobby Jindal	676,484	48.05%
Total votes		1,407,842	100.00%
Democratic gain from Republican			

== Sources ==
- Louisiana Secretary of State Elections Division. Official Election Results Database
- Parent, Wayne. Inside the Carnival: Unmasking Louisiana Politics. LSU Press, 2004.
- The New Orleans Times-Picayune. "Jindal takes easy lead heading into runoff." October 5, 2003.
