= Suzanne Haik Terrell =

American politician (born 1954)

Suzanne Terrell

Elections Commissioner of Louisiana
- In office January 4, 2000 – January 12, 2004
- Governor: Mike Foster
- Preceded by: Jerry Fowler
- Succeeded by: Position abolished

Member of the New Orleans City Council from District A
- In office May 1, 1994 – January 4, 2000
- Preceded by: Peggy Wilson
- Succeeded by: Scott Shea

Personal details
- Born: July 8, 1954 (age 71) New Orleans, Louisiana, U.S.
- Party: Republican
- Spouse: Walter Terrell
- Children: 3
- Education: Tulane University (BA); Loyola University, New Orleans (JD)

Suzanne Haik Terrell (born July 8, 1954) is an American politician who was the first Republican woman elected to statewide office in Louisiana. A practicing attorney, Terrell was the state's final commissioner of elections, a position which she held from 2000 to 2004. In 2002, she was the Republican nominee for United States Senate, losing a hotly contested and closely watched race against incumbent Senator Mary Landrieu. In 2005, U.S. President George W. Bush appointed Terrell to a position as Deputy Assistant Secretary in the United States Department of Commerce's Economic Development Administration. Terrell is currently a partner with the New Orleans law firm of Hangartner, Rydberg, and Terrell.

== Political career ==
As elections commissioner, Terrell streamlined department operations and advocated the merging of her office with the secretary of state, who already oversaw some elections operations. While in office Terrell's department won national recognition for its voting and registration systems. She was successful in abolishing her office as her term ended in 2004. No other Louisiana politician has abolished their current, occupied office.

=== 2002 Senate election ===
Terrell challenged freshman Democratic Senator Mary Landrieu's bid for reelection. Terrell finished second in the first-round vote, beating two other Republicans, Congressman John Cooksey and State Rep. Tony Perkins. Landrieu finished first but fell short of a majority.

Since the runoff would not happen until December, the Landrieu-Terrell matchup was the last Senate race decided that year. Terrell's campaign attracted national attention, including visits from President George W. Bush and his father, George Herbert Walker Bush, and Vice President Dick Cheney. Terrell had been co-chairman of the Bush campaign in Louisiana and was a member of the National Finance Committee. She was an elector for the Bush-Cheney slate in 2000. The national party had taken an interest in Terrell's campaign because it could have made the difference in their chances at retaking the Senate. (As it happened, the GOP would take back the Senate even before the Louisiana race had been decided.)

Landrieu was re-elected largely on the basis of her 79,000-vote plurality in Orleans Parish. She polled roughly 42,000 votes ahead of Terrell statewide, defeating her 52-48 percent.

=== Later political career ===
In a debate with Landrieu in 2002, the senator lashed out at Terrell and told her the Senate race would be "her last campaign", but it was not. In 2003, Terrell ran unsuccessfully for attorney general of Louisiana, losing to the former sheriff of the Orleans parish, Charles C. Foti, Jr., 54 to 46 percent. Foti had been backed by the Landrieu family.

In 2005, President Bush appointed Terrell to a post at the United States Department of Commerce following Hurricane Katrina. In her position, Terrell was actively involved in economic development initiatives in the Gulf Region.

== Personal life ==
Married since 1976 to Walter Lee Terrell, an ophthalmologist, Terrell has three daughters.

Her brother, Dr. Barrett George Haik (1951-2016) was the director of the Hamilton Eye Center in Memphis, Tennessee. Another brother, Dr. George M. Haik, Jr. (c. 1949-2021), was an ophthalmology at the George M. Haik Eye Clinic in New Orleans. Her surviving brother, Dr. Kenneth Haik (wife Diana), practices medicine in New Orleans.

Political offices
Preceded by Peggy Wilson	Member of the New Orleans City Council from District A 1994–2000	Succeeded by Scott Shea
Preceded by Jerry Fowler	Elections Commissioner of Louisiana; 2000–2004	Position abolished
Party political offices
Preceded by Woody Jenkins	Republican nominee for U.S. Senator from Louisiana (Class 2); 2002	Succeeded by John Kennedy
Vacant Title last held by Ben Bagert	Republican nominee for Attorney General of Louisiana; 2003	Succeeded by Royal Alexander
