= 2000 United States presidential election in Louisiana =

- November 7, 2000

Nominee	George W. Bush	Al Gore
Party	Republican	Democratic
Home state	Texas	Tennessee
Running mate	Dick Cheney	Joe Lieberman
Electoral vote	9	0
Popular vote	927,871	792,344
Percentage	52.55%	44.88%
Parish results
Bush
40–50%
50–60%
60–70%
70–80%
Gore
40–50%
50–60%
60–70%
70–80%
President before election
Bill Clinton
Democratic
Elected President
George W. Bush
Republican

The 2000 United States presidential election in Louisiana took place on November 7, 2000, and was part of the 2000 United States presidential election. Voters chose nine representatives, or electors, to the Electoral College, who voted for president and vice president.

Louisiana was won by George W. Bush (the Governor of neighboring Texas) over incumbent Democratic vice president Al Gore, a dramatic swing from the statewide results in 1996 when Democratic President Bill Clinton carried the state with 52% of the vote and with a double-digit margin of victory. Bush won most of the parishes and congressional districts in the state. Bush dominated among the rural areas of the state. The only congressional district Gore won was the second district, which represents the very urban area of New Orleans. As of the 2024 presidential election, this is the last election in which St. Landry Parish, West Baton Rouge Parish, and Bienville Parish voted for the Democratic candidate, and the last election in which Louisiana was decided by a single-digit margin.

In this election, Louisiana voted 8.2% to the right of the nation at-large. Louisiana was one of nine states won by Bush in the 2000 election that Clinton had carried in both preceding elections.

== General election ==
=== Polling ===
Poll source	Date(s)	Sample size	Margin of error	George W. Bush (R)	Al Gore (D)	Ralph Nader (G)	Other / undecided (Note: Calculated by taking the difference of 100% and all other listed candidates combined. For polls that do not report a figure for Nader, this includes his support.)
Mason-Dixon Polling & Strategy	October 21, 2000	624	—	52%	39%	1%	8%
Southeastern Louisiana University Social Science Research Center	October 21, 2000	660	—	46%	38%	2%	14%
Rasmussen Reports	October 19, 2000	733	—	48%	41%	—	11%
University of New Orleans Survey Research Center	October 19, 2000	461 (Note: Average of multiple versions or turnout models listed in the poll.)	—	48%	35%	2%	15%

=== Results ===
2000 United States presidential election in Louisiana
Party	Candidate	Running mate	Popular vote		Electoral vote		Swing
Party	Candidate	Running mate	Count	%	Count	%	Swing
Republican	George W. Bush of Texas	Dick Cheney of Wyoming	927,871	52.55%	9	100.00%	▲12.61%
Democratic	Al Gore of Tennessee	Joe Lieberman of Connecticut	792,344	44.88%	0	0.00%	▼7.13%
Green	Ralph Nader of Connecticut	Winona LaDuke of Minnesota	20,473	1.20%	0	0.00%	▲1.20%
Reform	Pat Buchanan of Virginia	Ezola B. Foster of California	3,169	0.80%	0	0.00%	▼6.91%
Libertarian	Harry Browne of Tennessee	Art Olivier of California	1,912	0.30%	0	0.00%	▼0.18%
Constitution	Howard Phillips of Virginia	Darrell Castle of Tennessee	23	0.00%	0	0.00%	Steady
Natural Law	John Hagelin of Iowa	Nat Goldhaber of California	367	0.06%	0	0.00%	▲0.06%
Total			1,765,656	100.00%	9	100.00%	

==== Results by parish ====
Parish	George W. Bush Republican		Al Gore Democratic		Various candidates Other parties		Margin		Total votes cast
Parish	#	%	#	%	#	%	#	%	Total votes cast
Acadia	13,814	59.45%	8,892	38.26%	532	2.29%	4,922	21.19%	23,238
Allen	4,035	48.66%	3,914	47.20%	343	4.14%	121	1.46%	8,292
Ascension	16,818	54.53%	13,385	43.40%	641	2.07%	3,433	11.13%	30,844
Assumption	4,388	43.65%	5,222	51.94%	443	4.41%	-834	-8.29%	10,053
Avoyelles	7,329	50.02%	6,701	45.73%	623	4.25%	628	4.29%	14,653
Beauregard	7,862	64.42%	3,958	32.43%	385	3.15%	3,904	31.99%	12,205
Bienville	3,269	46.66%	3,413	48.72%	324	4.62%	-144	-2.06%	7,006
Bossier	23,224	64.66%	11,933	33.23%	758	2.11%	11,291	31.43%	35,915
Caddo	46,807	48.94%	47,530	49.70%	1,302	1.36%	-723	-0.76%	95,639
Calcasieu	38,086	51.72%	33,919	46.06%	1,631	2.22%	4,167	5.66%	73,636
Caldwell	2,817	65.09%	1,359	31.40%	152	3.51%	1,458	33.69%	4,328
Cameron	2,593	61.99%	1,435	34.31%	155	3.70%	1,158	27.68%	4,183
Catahoula	2,912	61.11%	1,718	36.05%	135	2.84%	1,194	25.06%	4,765
Claiborne	3,384	53.88%	2,721	43.32%	176	2.80%	663	10.56%	6,281
Concordia	4,627	54.44%	3,569	41.99%	303	3.57%	1,058	12.45%	8,499
DeSoto	5,260	49.64%	5,036	47.53%	300	2.83%	224	2.11%	10,596
East Baton Rouge	89,128	52.74%	76,516	45.28%	3,345	1.98%	12,612	7.46%	168,989
East Carroll	1,280	39.45%	1,876	57.81%	89	2.74%	-596	-18.36%	3,245
East Feliciana	4,051	50.02%	3,870	47.78%	178	2.20%	181	2.24%	8,099
Evangeline	7,290	53.56%	5,763	42.34%	559	4.10%	1,527	11.22%	13,612
Franklin	5,363	64.18%	2,792	33.41%	201	2.41%	2,571	30.77%	8,356
Grant	4,784	67.81%	2,099	29.75%	172	2.44%	2,685	38.06%	7,055
Iberia	17,236	57.42%	11,762	39.18%	1,022	3.40%	5,474	18.24%	30,020
Iberville	5,573	38.43%	8,355	57.61%	575	3.96%	-2,782	-19.18%	14,503
Jackson	4,347	61.17%	2,582	36.34%	177	2.49%	1,765	24.83%	7,106
Jefferson	105,003	58.61%	70,411	39.30%	3,737	2.09%	34,592	19.31%	179,151
Jefferson Davis	6,945	55.36%	5,162	41.14%	439	3.50%	1,783	14.22%	12,546
Lafayette	48,491	61.94%	27,190	34.73%	2,612	3.33%	21,301	27.21%	78,293
Lafourche	18,575	53.92%	14,627	42.46%	1,247	3.62%	3,948	11.46%	34,449
LaSalle	4,564	74.72%	1,397	22.87%	147	2.41%	3,167	51.85%	6,108
Lincoln	9,246	55.86%	6,851	41.39%	454	2.75%	2,395	14.47%	16,551
Livingston	24,889	67.51%	11,008	29.86%	968	2.63%	13,881	37.65%	36,865
Madison	2,127	44.85%	2,489	52.48%	127	2.67%	-362	-7.63%	4,743
Morehouse	6,641	53.90%	5,289	42.93%	391	3.17%	1,352	10.97%	12,321
Natchitoches	7,332	49.35%	6,924	46.60%	601	4.05%	408	2.75%	14,857
Orleans	39,404	21.74%	137,630	75.95%	4,187	2.31%	-98,226	-54.21%	181,221
Ouachita	35,107	60.31%	21,457	36.86%	1,647	2.83%	13,650	23.45%	58,211
Plaquemines	6,302	57.65%	4,425	40.48%	204	1.87%	1,877	17.17%	10,931
Pointe Coupee	4,710	43.48%	5,813	53.67%	309	2.85%	-1,103	-10.19%	10,832
Rapides	28,831	58.81%	18,898	38.55%	1,295	2.64%	9,933	20.26%	49,024
Red River	2,200	48.65%	2,177	48.14%	145	3.21%	23	0.51%	4,522
Richland	4,895	57.69%	3,282	38.68%	308	3.63%	1,613	19.01%	8,485
Sabine	5,754	64.93%	2,846	32.11%	262	2.96%	2,908	32.82%	8,862
St. Bernard	16,255	56.79%	11,682	40.82%	684	2.39%	4,573	15.97%	28,621
St. Charles	11,981	55.70%	8,918	41.46%	611	2.84%	3,063	14.24%	21,510
St. Helena	1,965	37.40%	3,059	58.22%	230	4.38%	-1,094	-20.82%	5,254
St. James	3,813	35.62%	6,523	60.93%	369	3.45%	-2,710	-25.31%	10,705
St. John the Baptist	7,423	41.91%	9,745	55.02%	545	3.07%	-2,322	-13.11%	17,713
St. Landry	15,449	45.24%	18,067	52.90%	635	1.86%	-2,618	-7.66%	34,151
St. Martin	9,961	47.94%	9,853	47.42%	964	4.64%	108	0.52%	20,778
St. Mary	11,325	51.93%	9,851	45.17%	634	2.90%	1,474	6.76%	21,810
St. Tammany	59,193	70.69%	22,722	27.13%	1,822	2.18%	36,471	43.56%	83,737
Tangipahoa	20,421	54.96%	15,843	42.64%	891	2.40%	4,578	12.32%	37,155
Tensas	1,330	44.19%	1,580	52.49%	100	3.32%	-250	-8.30%	3,010
Terrebonne	21,314	58.12%	14,414	39.30%	947	2.58%	6,900	18.82%	36,675
Union	5,772	61.78%	3,205	34.30%	366	3.92%	2,567	27.48%	9,343
Vermilion	12,495	56.20%	8,704	39.15%	1,036	4.65%	3,791	17.05%	22,235
Vernon	8,794	63.60%	4,655	33.67%	378	2.73%	4,139	29.93%	13,827
Washington	8,983	53.19%	7,399	43.81%	505	3.00%	1,584	9.38%	16,887
Webster	9,420	55.12%	7,197	42.11%	473	2.77%	2,223	13.01%	17,090
West Baton Rouge	4,924	48.42%	5,058	49.74%	187	1.84%	-134	-1.32%	10,169
West Carroll	3,220	68.88%	1,319	28.21%	136	2.91%	1,901	40.67%	4,675
West Feliciana	2,512	51.69%	2,187	45.00%	161	3.31%	325	6.69%	4,860
Winn	4,028	63.32%	2,167	34.07%	166	2.61%	1,861	29.25%	6,361
Totals	927,871	52.55%	792,344	44.88%	45,441	2.57%	135,527	7.67%	1,765,656

===== Parishes that flipped from Democratic to Republican =====
- Acadia (largest city: Crowley)
- Allen (largest city: Oakdale)
- Ascension (largest community: Prairieville)
- Avoyelles (largest city: Marksville)
- Calcasieu (largest city: Lake Charles)
- Caldwell (largest community: Clarks)
- Cameron (largest community: Grand Lake)
- Catahoula (largest town: Jonesville)
- Claiborne (largest town: Homer)
- Concordia (largest city: Vidalia)
- DeSoto (largest city: Mansfield)
- East Baton Rouge (largest city: Baton Rouge)
- East Feliciana (largest town: Jackson)
- Evangeline (largest city: Ville Platte)
- Franklin (largest city: Winnsboro)
- Iberia (largest city: New Iberia)
- Jackson (largest town: Jonesboro)
- Jefferson Davis (largest city: Jennings)
- Lafourche (largest city: Thibodaux)
- Lincoln (largest city: Ruston)
- Morehouse (largest city: Bastrop)
- Natchitoches (largest city: Natchitoches)
- Plaquemines (largest community: Belle Chasse)
- Rapides (largest city: Alexandria)
- Red River (largest town: Coushatta)
- Richland (largest town: Rayville)
- Sabine (largest town: Many)
- Saint Bernard (largest community: Chalmette)
- Saint Charles (largest community: Luling)
- Saint Martin (largest city: Breaux Bridge)
- Saint Mary (largest city: Morgan City)
- Tangipahoa (largest city: Hammond)
- Terrebonne (Largest city: Houma)
- Vermilion (largest city: Abbeville)
- Vernon (largest city: Leesville)
- Washington (largest city: Bogalusa)
- Webster (largest city: Minden)
- West Feliciana (largest town: St. Francisville)
- Winn (largest city: Winnfield)

==== Results by congressional district ====
Bush won six of seven congressional districts, including one held by a Democrat.

District	Bush	Gore	Representative
1st	66%	32%	David Vitter
2nd	20%	78%	William J. Jefferson
3rd	52%	45%	Billy Tauzin
4th	54%	43%	Jim McCrery
5th	59%	38%	John Cooksey
6th	54%	44%	Richard H. Baker
7th	55%	42%	Chris John

== Electors ==
Technically, the voters of Louisiana cast their ballots for electors: representatives to the Electoral College. Louisiana is allocated nine electors because it has seven congressional districts and two senators. All candidates who appear on the ballot or qualify to receive write-in votes must submit a list of nine electors, who pledge to vote for their candidate and their running mate. Whoever wins the majority of votes in the state is awarded all nine electoral votes. Their chosen electors then vote for president and vice president. Although electors are pledged to their candidate and running mate, they are not obligated to vote for them. An elector who votes for someone other than their candidate is known as a faithless elector.

The electors of each state and the District of Columbia met on December 18, 2000 to cast their votes for president and vice president. The Electoral College itself never meets as one body. Instead, the electors from each state and the District of Columbia met in their respective capitols.

The following were the members of the Electoral College from the state. All were pledged to and voted for George W. Bush and Dick Cheney:

1. Patricia Brister
2. Donald Ensenat
3. Heulette Fontenot Jr.
4. Mike Foster
5. Steve Jordan
6. Elizabeth Levy
7. Al Lippman
8. Suzanne Haik Terrell
9. Michael Woods Sr.

== See also ==
- United States presidential elections in Louisiana
- Presidency of George W. Bush
