= Richard Ieyoub =

American lawyer and politician (1944–2023)

42nd Attorney General of Louisiana
- In office January 13, 1992 – January 12, 2004
- Governor: Edwin Edwards; Mike Foster
- Preceded by: Billy Guste
- Succeeded by: Charles Foti

Personal details
- Born: Richard Phillip Ieyoub; August 11, 1944 Lake Charles, Louisiana, U.S.
- Died: April 10, 2023 (aged 78) Baton Rouge, Louisiana, U.S.
- Party: Democratic
- Spouse: Caprice Brown
- Children: 7
- Education: McNeese State University (BA); Louisiana State University (JD)

Richard Phillip Ieyoub, Sr. (/ˈaɪjuːb/ EYE-yoob; August 11, 1944 – April 10, 2023) was an American attorney and politician from the state of Louisiana. He served as the attorney general of Louisiana from 1992 to 2004. He unsuccessfully ran for governor in 2003.

Ieyoub's father, Philip, emigrated from Lebanon to Lake Charles, Louisiana, and his mother, Virginia, was a first-generation Lebanese American.

Ieyoub was inducted into the Louisiana Political Museum and Hall of Fame in 2016.

Ieyoub and his wife, Caprice, had seven children. He died in Baton Rouge, Louisiana, on April 10, 2023, at the age of 78, from complications of surgery for a ruptured aneurysm.

Party political offices
Preceded by William J. Guste	Democratic nominee for Attorney General of Louisiana; 1991, 1995, 1999	Succeeded by Charles Foti
Legal offices
Preceded by Billy Guste	Attorney General of Louisiana; 1992–2004	Succeeded by Charles Foti
