= Charles Foti =

American lawyer and politician

43rd Louisiana Attorney General
- In office January 12, 2004 – January 14, 2008
- Governor: Kathleen Blanco
- Preceded by: Richard Ieyoub
- Succeeded by: Buddy Caldwell

Sheriff of Orleans Parish, Louisiana
- In office 1974–2004
- Succeeded by: Marlin N. Gusman (elected 2004)

Personal details
- Born: Charles Carmen Foti Jr. November 30, 1937 (age 88)
- Party: Democratic
- Education: University of New Orleans (BA); Loyola University New Orleans (JD)
- Profession: Attorney

Military service
- Allegiance: United States
- Branch/service: United States Army
- Years of service: 1955-1958
- Battles/wars: Vietnam War

Charles Carmen Foti Jr. (born November 30, 1937) is an American attorney and politician who served from 2004 to 2008 as Attorney General of Louisiana. Prior to becoming attorney general, Foti served for thirty years as Sheriff of Orleans Parish.

Foti won the attorney general's office when the incumbent Democrat, Richard Ieyoub of Lake Charles, ran unsuccessfully for governor in the 2003 primary. Foti defeated the Republican candidate, Suzanne Haik Terrell, also of New Orleans, 689,179 votes (54 percent) to 597,917 (46 percent).

Foti failed in his bid to win reelection as attorney general, having finished last in the three-way nonpartisan blanket primary held on October 20, 2007. The leading candidates were the Republican lawyer, Royal Alexander of Shreveport, and the Democratic District Attorney, Buddy Caldwell, of Tallulah. Caldwell won the general election and was sworn in to replace Foti on January 14, 2008. Caldwell later switched to the Republican Party in 2011, to secure his second term.

On February 1, 2014, Foti ran again for the Orleans Parish sheriff's position; he finished second in a four-candidate field. He polled 23,676 votes (28.6 percent). Foti's fellow Democrat and successor as sheriff, Marlin Gusman Sr., with 40,557 votes (48.9 percent), nearly won the position outright in the nonpartisan blanket primary. Foti and Gusman entered a runoff election on March 15, in which Gusman handily prevailed, 40,068 (66.7 percent) to Foti's 19,996 (33.3 percent).

== Early life and education ==
Foti was born in 1937 in New Orleans. He attended public schools, graduating from Warren Easton High School in the city. He earned a Bachelor's degree at the University of New Orleans, where he was a member of Tau Kappa Epsilon fraternity. After military service and working, Foti returned to university, earning a J.D., Loyola University New Orleans College of Law in 1965.

== Personal ==
From 1955 to 1958, Foti served in the United States Army.

A long-time advocate for the elderly, during his time as criminal sheriff, Foti organized Thanksgiving meals for New Orleans senior citizens who were alone or could not afford a holiday meal. He also started a back-to-work program for seniors over the age of fifty-five. As attorney general, Foti investigated and prosecuted abuse of the elderly in Louisiana's health-care facilities.

After vacating the attorney general's office, Foti joined the New Orleans law firm Kahn Swick & Foti, LLC, where he engages in the practice of securities and consumer fraud law.

== Criticism ==
In the wake of Hurricane Katrina, Foti as State AG prosecuted private citizens on behalf of the numerous elderly New Orleans residents who died in flooding, power failures, and resulting disaster. Foti reportedly claimed that some medical staff, who worked at Memorial Hospital in New Orleans during the storm, had murdered several patients. In July 2007, Dr. Pou sued Foti, accusing him of playing politics with her life and the dead from Katrina. After the police conducted a lengthy investigation, a grand jury in July 2007 declined to indict Pou. The charges have since been expunged. In 2009, the legislature passed a bill to pay Dr. Pou's legal fees, which was signed by Governor Bobby Jindal. Several lawmakers have apologized for the accusations against Pou. The failed prosecution of Dr. Pou was an issue during Foti's unsuccessful re-election campaign in 2007.

In a related story, the owners of a nursing home near Poydras filed a civil suit against federal, state and local officials, including the Army Corps of Engineers, Governor Kathleen Babineaux Blanco, Attorney General Charles C. Foti Jr., and numerous other authorities and agencies for failing to evacuate nursing home residents during the hurricane.

== Electoral history ==
Criminal Sheriff, Parish of Orleans, 1990

Threshold > 50%

First Ballot, February 3, 1990

Candidate	Affiliation	Support	Outcome
Charles Foti	Democratic	needs more research	Elected
Henry Julien Jr.	Democratic	needs more research	Defeated

Criminal Sheriff, Parish of Orleans, 1994

Threshold > 50%

First Ballot, February 5, 1994

Candidate	Affiliation	Support	Outcome
Charles Foti	Democratic	Unopposed	Elected

Criminal Sheriff, Parish of Orleans, 1998

Threshold > 50%

First Ballot, February 7, 1998

Candidate	Affiliation	Support	Outcome
Charles Foti	Democratic	Unopposed	Elected

Criminal Sheriff, Parish of Orleans, 2002

Threshold > 50%

First Ballot, February 2, 2002

Candidate	Affiliation	Support	Outcome
Charles Foti	Democratic	90,897 (71%)	Elected
Morris Reed	Democratic	27,378 (22%)	Defeated
Orlando Matthews	Democratic	9,014 (7%)	Defeated

Attorney General of Louisiana, 2003

Threshold > 50%

First Ballot, October 4, 2003

Candidate	Affiliation	Support	Outcome
Charles Foti	Democratic	689,179 (54%)	Elected
Suzanne Haik Terrell	Republican	597,917 (46%)	Defeated

Attorney General of Louisiana, 2007

Threshold > 50%

First Ballot, October 20, 2007

Candidate	Affiliation	Support	Outcome
James "Buddy" Caldwell	Democratic	434,111 (36%)	Runoff
Royal Alexander	Republican	395,649 (32%)	Runoff
Charles Foti	Democratic	389,568 (32%)	Defeated

Party political offices
Preceded by Richard Ieyoub	Democratic nominee for Attorney General of Louisiana; 2003	Succeeded by Buddy Caldwell
Legal offices
Preceded by Richard Ieyoub	Attorney General of Louisiana; 2004–2008	Succeeded by James "Buddy" Caldwell
