= John Cooksey =

American ophthalmologist and politician (1941–2022)

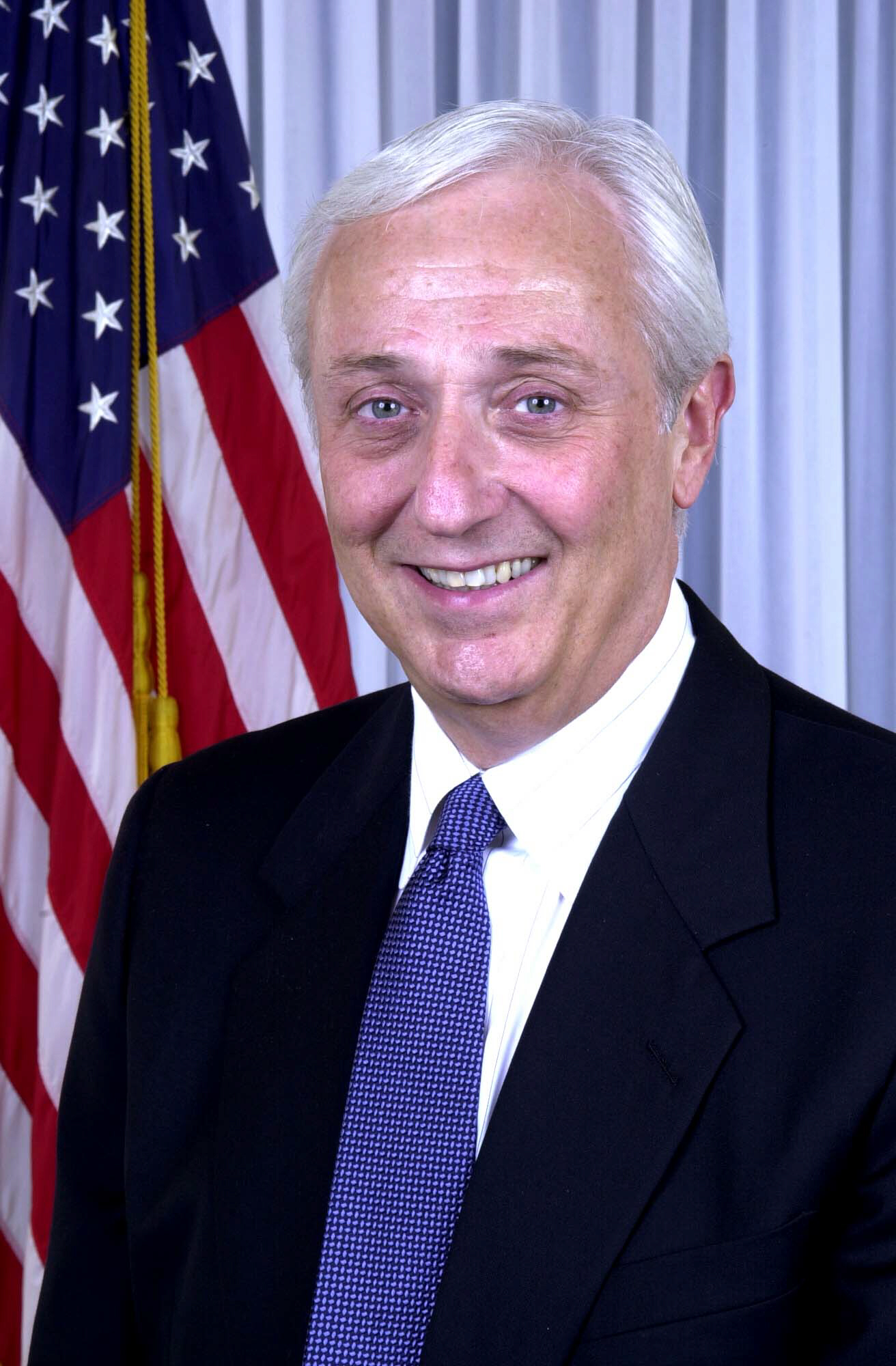

Member of the U.S. House of Representatives from Louisiana's 5th district
- In office January 3, 1997 – January 3, 2003
- Preceded by: Cleo Fields (redistricting)
- Succeeded by: Rodney Alexander

Personal details
- Born: John Charles Cooksey; August 20, 1941 Alexandria, Louisiana, U.S.
- Died: June 4, 2022 (aged 80) Columbia, Louisiana, U.S.
- Party: Republican
- Spouse: Ann Grabill
- Children: 3
- Education: Louisiana State University (BS, MD); University of Texas at Austin (MBA)

John Charles Cooksey (August 20, 1941 – June 4, 2022) was an American ophthalmologist and politician who served as a Republican member of the United States House of Representatives for Louisiana's 5th congressional district from 1997 to 2003.

== Early life and education ==
Cooksey was born in Alexandria in Rapides Parish in Central Louisiana. He grew up in Olla, Louisiana and graduated from LaSalle High School. His is father operated a sawmill outside of town where John learned the value of hardwork. He attended Louisiana State University in Baton Rouge and received his M.D. degree from the LSU Health Sciences Center New Orleans in 1966. In 1994, he received a Master of Business Administration from the University of Texas at Austin. From 1967 until 1969, he served in the United States Air Force, where he was stationed in Texas and Thailand. He served in the Air Force Reserve from 1969 until 1972.

== Career ==
Cooksey was elected to Congress in 1996 and represented Louisiana's Fifth District for three terms, traditionally based in the northeastern quadrant of the state about Monroe, but since reconfigured to reach deep into South Louisiana as well. Cooksey first won the seat by defeating Democratic state legislator Francis C. Thompson of Delhi in Richland Parish. Cooksey had edged past former U.S. Representative Clyde C. Holloway of Forest Hill in Rapides Parish in the nonpartisan blanket primary. In that campaign, Cooksey pledged to serve no more than three terms in the House, a pledge that he kept.

In 2002, Cooksey was an unsuccessful candidate in the Republican primary for the United States Senate seat held until 2015 by Democrat Mary Landrieu. In that campaign, Cooksey made a derogatory remark about Arabs — comparing traditional Arab headdresses like turbans and keffiyehs to diapers fastened by fan belts — which was attacked by his opponents as racist. He never overcame the blunder. In the November general election, the losing Republican candidate was Cooksey's intra-party rival, Suzanne Haik Terrell of New Orleans.

In addition to the reelection of Landrieu, the Democrats temporarily regained Cooksey's House seat in the same general election balloting.

== Personal life ==
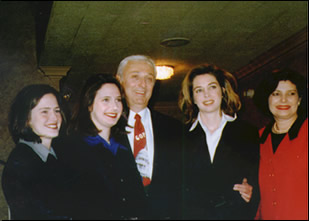
Cooksey with family

After his Senate campaign, Cooksey retired from politics and resumed his medical practice. He and his wife, the former Ann Grabill (born 1943), had three children. He was Methodist and a member of Lambda Chi Alpha fraternity.

Cooksey died in Columbia, Louisiana on June 4, 2022, at the age of 80.

U.S. House of Representatives
Preceded by Jim McCrery	Member of the U.S. House of Representatives from Louisiana's 5th congressional district 1997–2003	Succeeded by Rodney Alexander
