= 2007 Louisiana Attorney General election =

- October 20, 2007 (first round); November 17, 2007 (runoff)
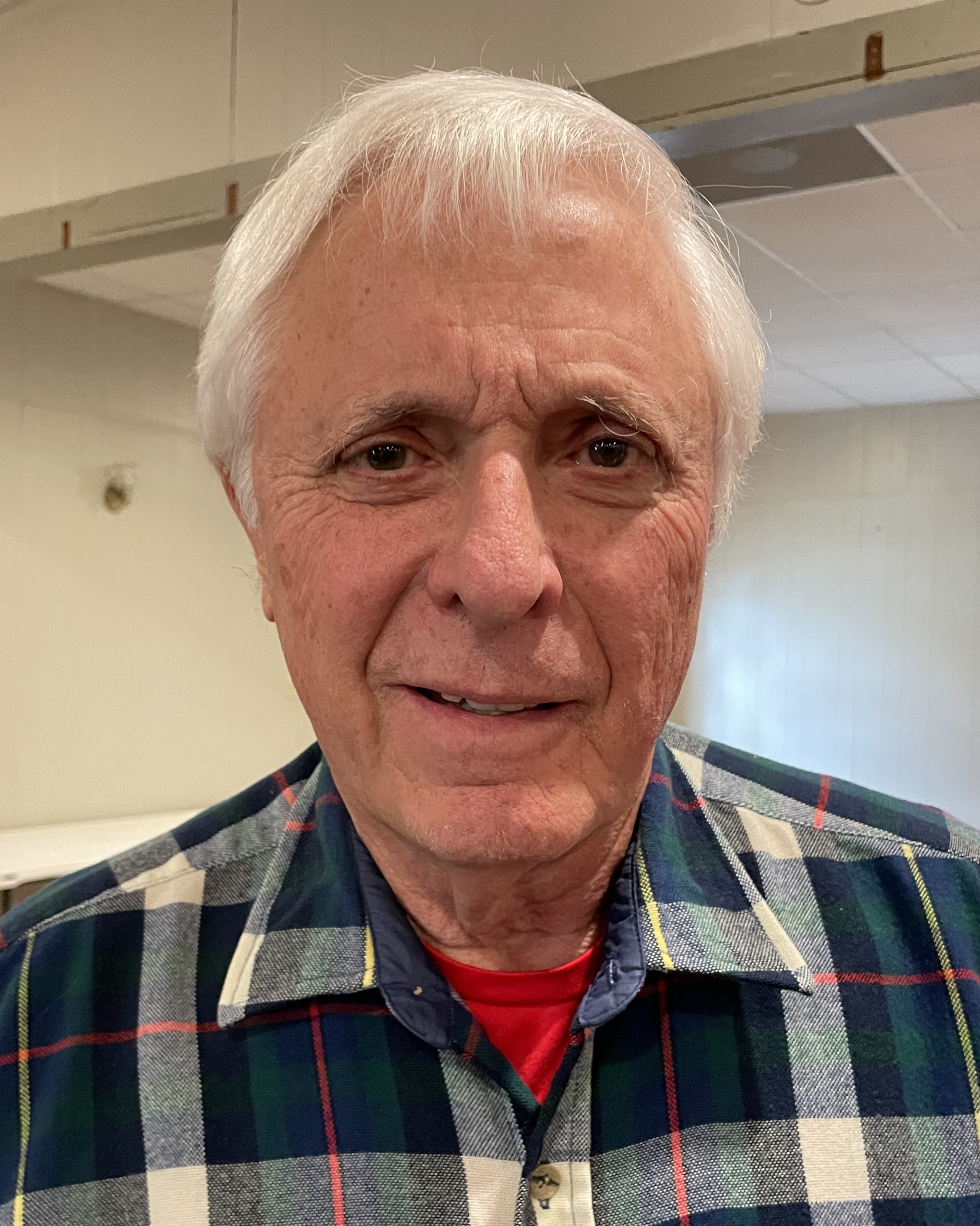

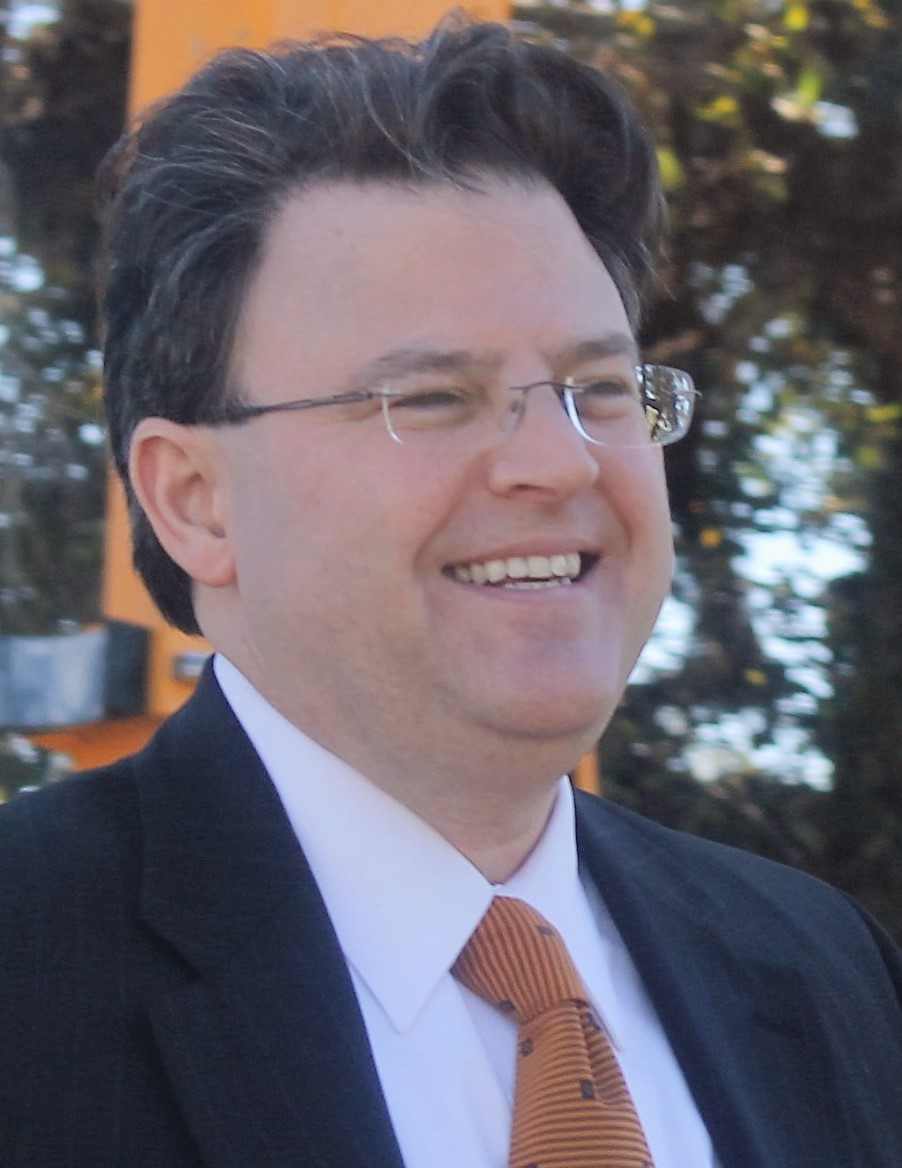

Nominee	Buddy Caldwell	Royal Alexander	Charles Foti
Party	Democratic	Republican	Democratic
First round	434,507; 35.64%	395,498; 32.44%	389,300; 31.93%
Runoff	477,574; 66.6%	239,485; 33.4%	Eliminated
- Caldwell: 30–40% 40–50% 50–60% 60–70% 70–80% 80–90% Alexander: 30–40% 40–50% 50–60% Foti: 30–40% 40–50% 50–60%
Attorney General before election
Charles Foti
Democratic
Elected Attorney General
Buddy Caldwell
Democratic

The 2007 Louisiana Attorney General election took place on October 20, 2007, to elect the Attorney General of the state of Louisiana, with a runoff, held on November 17, 2007. Incumbent Democrat Charles Foti sought re-election to a second term in office but was defeated in the state's jungle primary by Republican Royal Alexander and Democrat Buddy Caldwell. As neither Caldwell nor Alexander received a majority of the vote, they advanced to a runoff on November 17, which Caldwell won with 66.6% to Alexander's 31.9%. As of 2026, this is last time a Democrat was elected Attorney General of Louisiana. Caldwell was re-elected unopposed as a Republican in 2011.

== Candidates ==
=== Republican party ===
==== Declared ====
- Royal Alexander, attorney and writer

=== Democratic party ===
==== Declared ====
- Charles Foti, incumbent attorney general
- Buddy Caldwell, attorney

== Jungle primary ==
=== Results ===
2007 Louisiana Attorney General primary election
Party	Candidate	Votes	%	±%
Democratic	James "Buddy" Caldwell	434,507	35.64	
Republican	Royal Alexander	395,498	32.44	
Democratic	Charles Foti (incumbent)	389,300	31.93	
Turnout		1,219,305	100	

== Runoff ==
=== Results ===
2007 Louisiana Attorney General runoff election
Party	Candidate	Votes	%	±%
Democratic	James "Buddy" Caldwell	477,574	66.6	
Republican	Royal Alexander	239,485	33.4	
Turnout		717,059	100	
