= Tony Perkins (politician) =

American politician (born 1963)

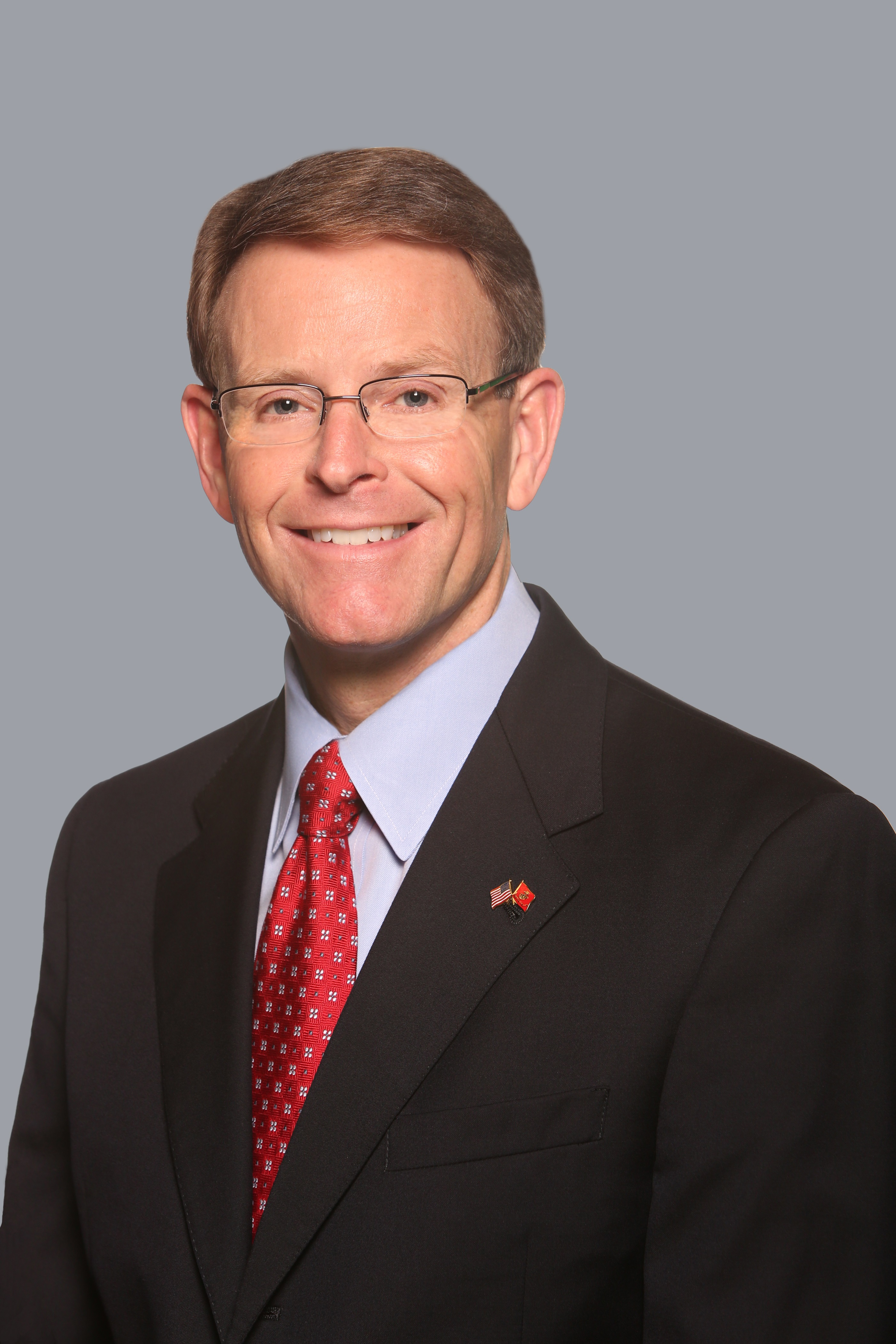

4th President of the Family Research Council
- Incumbent
- Assumed office September 1, 2003
- Preceded by: Kenneth Connor

Chair of the United States Commission on International Religious Freedom
- In office June 17, 2019 – June 16, 2020
- Preceded by: Tenzin Dorjee
- Succeeded by: Gayle Manchin

Member of the Louisiana House of Representatives from the 64th district
- In office January 3, 1996 – January 12, 2004
- Preceded by: Mike McCleary
- Succeeded by: Bodi White

Personal details
- Born: Anthony Richard Perkins; March 20, 1963 (age 63) Cleveland, Oklahoma, U.S.
- Party: Republican
- Spouse: Lawana Perkins
- Children: 5
- Education: Liberty University (BS); Louisiana State University (MPA)
- Website: tonyperkins.com

Anthony Richard Perkins (born March 20, 1963) is an American politician and Southern Baptist pastor who has served as president of the Family Research Council since 2003. Previously, he was a police officer and television reporter. From 1996 to 2004, he served as a member of the Louisiana House of Representatives. He unsuccessfully ran for the U.S. Senate in 2002. On May 14, 2018, he was appointed to the United States Commission on International Religious Freedom by then-Senate Majority Leader Mitch McConnell, and on June 17, 2019, the Commission elected him chairman.

== Early life and career ==
Perkins was born and raised in the northern Oklahoma city of Cleveland and graduated in 1981 from Cleveland High School. He received his Bachelor of Science degree from Liberty University. He later earned a Master of Public Administration degree from Louisiana State University in Baton Rouge. After college, Perkins entered the United States Marine Corps. Following his tour of duty, he became a reserve deputy with the East Baton Rouge Parish Sheriff's Office and also worked with the U.S. State Department's Anti-Terrorism Assistance Program instructing hostage negotiation and bomb disposal to hundreds of police officers from around the world.

After the federal contract for the anti-terrorism program ended, Perkins left law enforcement to work for KBTR, the Baton Rouge TV station owned by then-State Representative Woody Jenkins. At KBTR, Perkins opened a news division.

== Political career ==
=== Louisiana House of Representatives ===
Perkins won an open seat in the Louisiana House representing District 64 (the eastern Baton Rouge suburbs, including part of Livingston Parish) when he defeated Democrat Herman L. Milton of Baker 63% to 37% in the nonpartisan blanket primary held on October 21, 1995. He was elected on a conservative platform of strong families and limited government. Four years later, he was reelected without opposition. He retired from the legislature in 2004, fulfilling a promise to serve no more than two terms.

While in office, Perkins authored legislation to require Louisiana public schools to install Internet filtering software, to provide daily silent prayer, and to prevent what he termed "censorship of America's Christian heritage". Perkins also authored the nation's first covenant marriage law, a voluntary type of marriage that permits divorce only in cases of physical abuse, abandonment, adultery, imprisonment or after two years of separation.

Perkins opposed casino gambling in Louisiana, calling a 1996 plan to restrict the location of gambling riverboats to one side of the river "putting lipstick on a hog. It doesn't make the bill any better, it just looks a little better." Perkins was described as "staunchly anti-abortion" by Public Broadcasting Service which also credited him with working on law and order and economic development issues while in the state house. Perkins was instrumental in increasing state regulation of Louisiana abortion clinics; he sponsored a law to require state licensing and sanitary inspections.

=== 2002 U.S. Senate election ===
Perkins ran for the United States Senate in 2002 as a social and religious conservative Republican. Louisiana's then-Governor, Murphy J. Foster Jr., and the National Republican Senatorial Committee backed other candidates. Perkins finished in fourth place in the nonpartisan blanket primary with just under 10% of the vote. The Democratic incumbent, Mary Landrieu, was re-elected in the general election against another Republican, Suzanne Haik Terrell.

=== USCIRF appointment ===
On May 14, 2018, he was appointed as one of nine commissioners to the United States Commission on International Religious Freedom (USCIRF). His appointment was opposed by the Hindu American Foundation for what the group called his track record of "hateful stances against non-Christians."

On June 17, 2019, the USCIRF elected Perkins as chair for the commission. On June 16, 2020, he became the USCIRF vice chair. On March 27, 2021, he was sanctioned by the Chinese government after the U.S. imposed sanctions on China.

=== Political future ===
Perkins was floated as a potential Republican candidate for the U.S. Senate against Mary Landrieu in the 2014 election. Despite strongly criticising Bill Cassidy, the main Republican challenger to Landrieu, as "pretty weak on the issues", Perkins said in an interview in January 2014 that he would not run against Landrieu. He did however express interest in running for David Vitter's U.S. Senate Seat, should Vitter be elected Governor of Louisiana in 2015. Vitter lost the election and announced he would not run for re-election to the Senate, but Perkins declined to run in the 2016 election and endorsed John Fleming for the seat.

== Activism ==
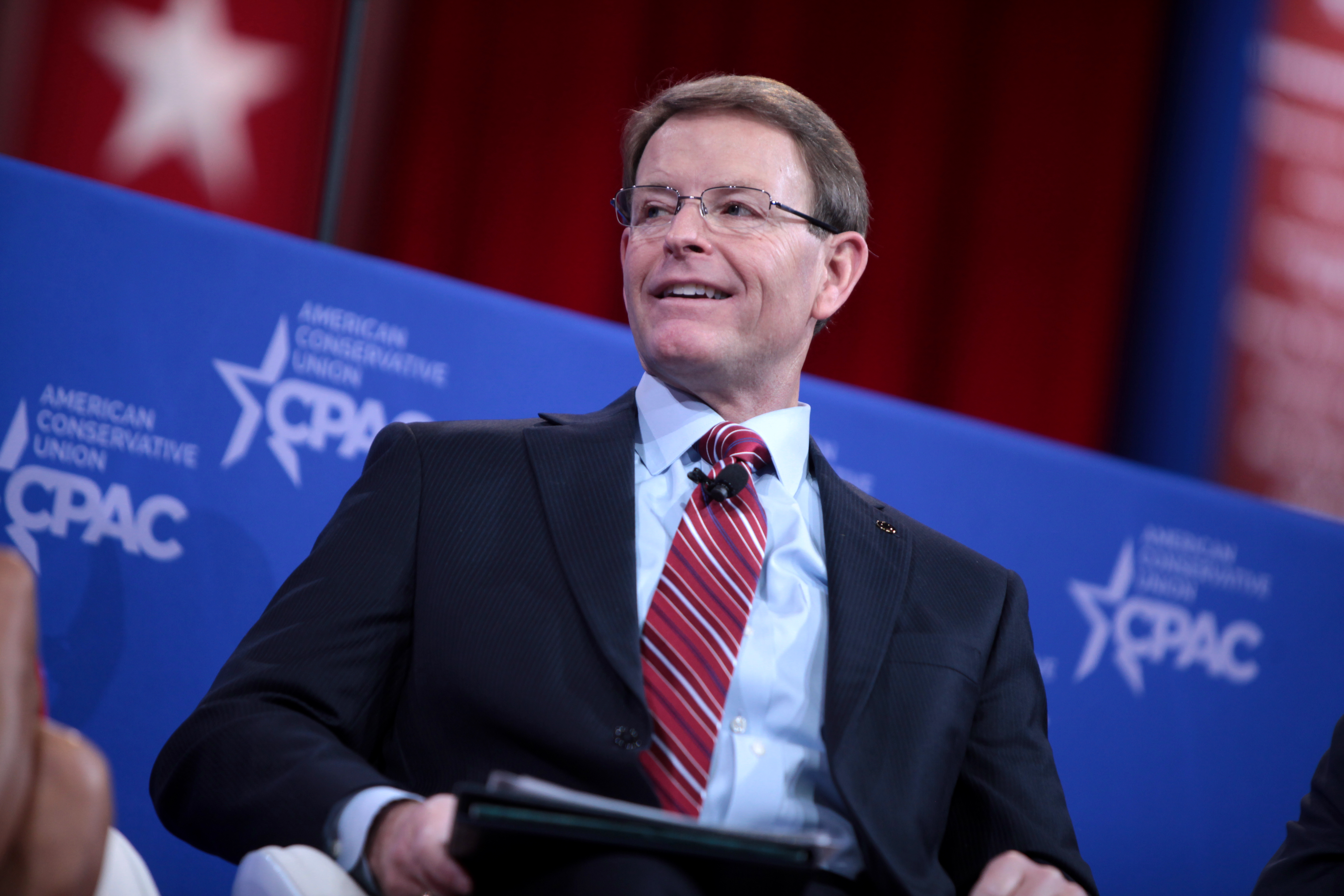
Perkins at CPAC in 2015

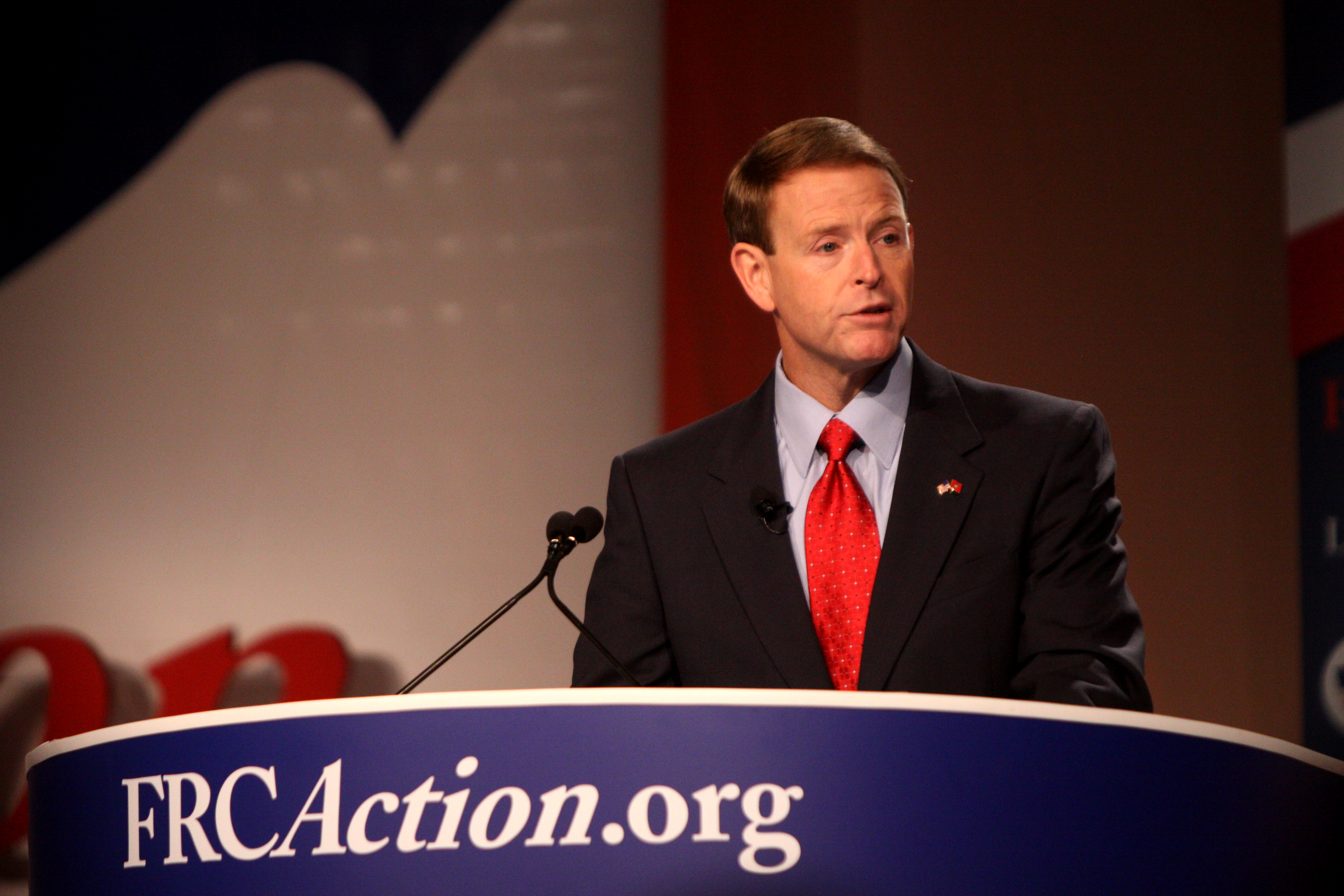
Perkins speaking at the annual Values Voter Summit in 2011

=== Louisiana Family Forum ===
According to the Baptist Press, Perkins' "concern about the influence of the homosexual movement" led to his involvement in the 1998 founding of the Louisiana Family Forum, a conservative, faith-oriented, anti-abortion, and non-profit group.

=== Family Research Council ===
In September 2003, Perkins withdrew from the race for Louisiana state insurance commissioner to become the president of the conservative Christian Family Research Council (FRC). He replaced Ken Connor. In addition to his duties as president of the FRC, Perkins hosts a radio program, Washington Watch with Tony Perkins.

Perkins was involved in the 2005 controversy over the disconnection of life support for Terri Schiavo, a woman who had been in a "persistent vegetative state" for a number of years. After a final court order permitted Schiavo's husband to remove her feeding tube and thereby cause her to die, Perkins stated, "we should remember that her death is a symptom of a greater problem: that the courts no longer respect human life."

In October 2008, Perkins called the passage of California Proposition 8 (which prohibited same-sex marriage in the state) "more important than the presidential election", adding that the United States has survived despite picking bad presidents in the past but "we will not survive if we lose the institution of marriage."

In 2010, Perkins dismissed the SPLC hate group designation of FRC as a political attack by a "liberal organization" and as part of "the left's smear campaign of conservatives".

== Political positions ==
=== Candidates ===
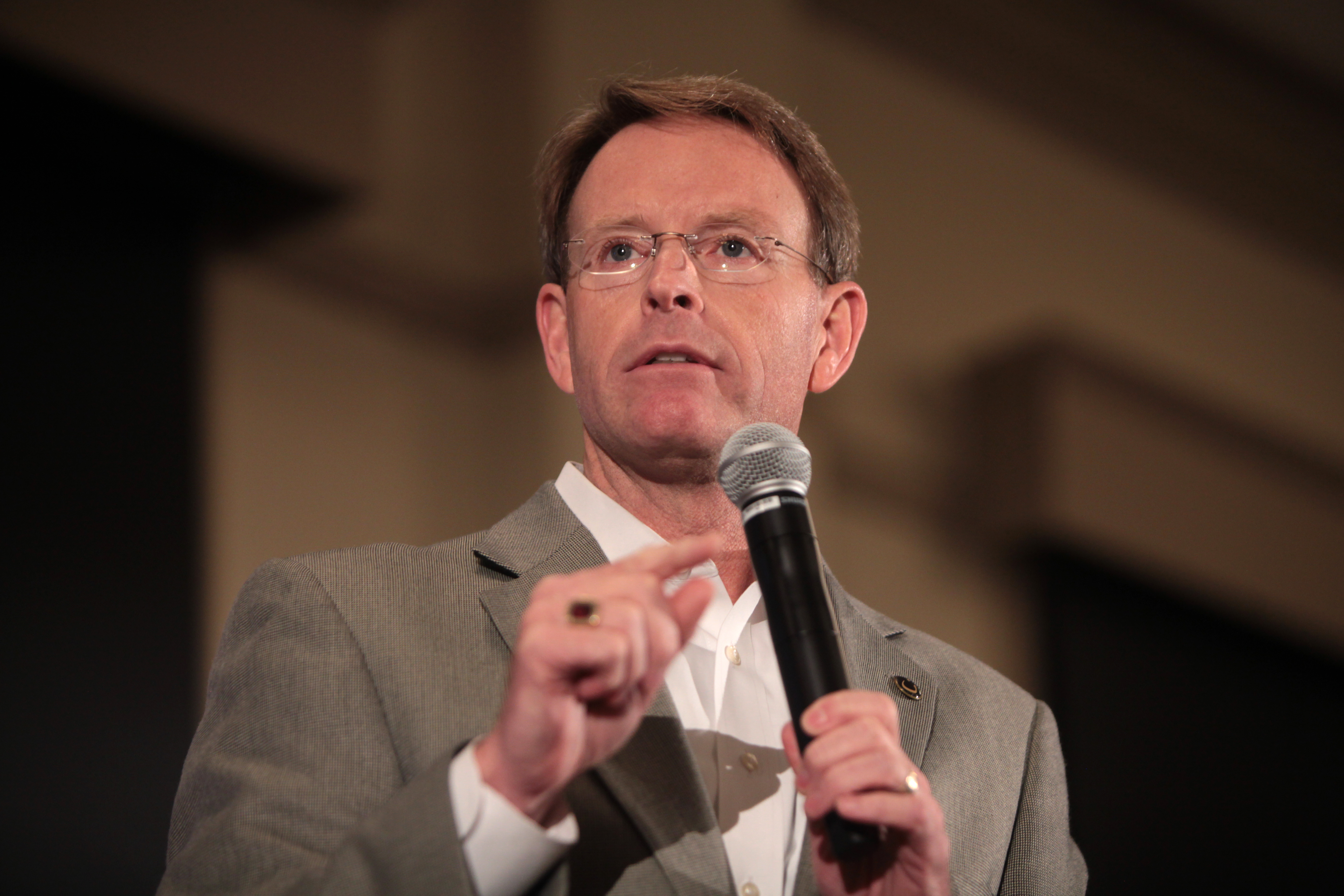
Perkins speaking at a Ted Cruz presidential campaign rally in 2016

In 2015, Perkins said the debate over Obama's birth certificate as "legitimate", remarking that it "makes sense" to conclude that Obama was a Muslim. That year, a survey reported that "54 percent of GOP voters thought Obama was a Muslim".

In 2016, Perkins endorsed Ted Cruz for the Republican presidential nomination.

In 2017, some supporters of a political candidate, Wesley Goodman, who was alleged to have committed a sexual assault in 2015, complained that Perkins did not reveal information to the public about Goodman's actions.

In 2018, Perkins was willing to overlook Donald Trump's past, stating that President Trump should be given a "Mulligan". Perkins opined that Trump was "providing the leadership we need at this time, in our country and in our culture."

=== Israel ===
In 2014, Perkins released an editorial explaining why he supports Israel.

=== Judicial nominees ===
In 2005, Perkins opposed the filibustering of certain right-leaning federal judicial nominees by U.S. Senate Democrats, arguing that the Democrats were waging a "campaign against orthodox religious views", and that the judicial nominees were being persecuted for their Christian faith. He became one of the organizers and hosts of Justice Sunday, a series of events that sought to mobilize the evangelical Christian base in support of the nominees.

=== LGBT rights ===
In 2010, Perkins opposed the overturning of the "Don't ask, don't tell" law that prohibited people who were openly gay or lesbian from serving in the U.S. military. Perkins argued that the repeal would, among other things, infringe on the religious liberty of military chaplains and other service members holding orthodox Christian views.

In 2006, Perkins urged Congress to pass the Federal Marriage Amendment to the U.S. Constitution which would define marriage in the United States as the union between one man and one woman. He explained his reasoning in a 2006 Human Events column:

The definition of marriage as the union of one man and one woman is rooted in the order of nature itself. It promotes the continuation of the human race and the cooperation of a mother and a father in raising the children they produce. This union can only be protected through amending the United States Constitution. If it's not, activists will continue using the courts to sell a five-legged dog.

Perkins believes natural disasters are divine punishments for homosexuality. His own home was destroyed in the 2016 Louisiana floods, which he described as "a flood of near-biblical proportions". In 2018, Perkins wrote about his opposition to the 2003 Lawrence v. Texas decision, the landmark Supreme Court decision which struck down state anti-sodomy laws, saying "Then, the next biggest shoe would drop — Lawrence v. Texas, the Supreme Court ruling that struck down Texas's ban on sodomy."

=== Minimum wage ===
Perkins opposes any increases in the minimum wage, which he stated in a book that he co-authored with Harry R. Jackson Jr. in 2008. Jackson said that the minimum wage is rooted in racism.

=== Religion ===
In June 2019, Perkins advocated for the "fundamental human right of religious freedom" for non-Christians.

He criticized the persecution of Uyghurs in China and religious minorities in Iran.

In September 2010, Perkins said that "the ultimate evil has been committed" when Muslims interpret the Quran in its literal context, that Islam "tears at the fabric of democracy," and that world history classes dishonestly portray Islam in a positive light by providing an "airbrushed" portrait of the religion itself.

In 2007, Perkins opposed the first-ever Hindu prayer before the United States Senate, saying, "There is no historic connection between America and the polytheistic creed of the Hindu faith." He also opposed a US Marines yoga and meditation program for PTSD prevention, characterizing the Hindu and Buddhist practices as "goofy".

=== Second Amendment ===
Perkins is a self-described "ardent supporter of the Second Amendment" who is "willing to talk about laws regarding the ownership and use of guns by those who should not have them."

=== Race relations ===
On May 17, 2001, Perkins gave a speech to the Louisiana chapter of the Council of Conservative Citizens, a white supremacist group that has described black people as a "retrograde species of humanity". Perkins said he did not know the group's ideology at the time. In an April 26, 2005, article in The Nation, Max Blumenthal reported that while managing the unsuccessful U. S. Senate campaign of Woody Jenkins in 1996, Perkins "paid former Ku Klux Klan Grand Wizard David Duke $82,500 for his mailing list." Perkins denied knowing about the purchase. A document authorizing the payment was reported to contain Perkins' signature. The incident resurfaced in the local press in 2002, during Perkins' unsuccessful Senate run.

=== 2020 election results ===
Perkins signed a December 10, 2020 letter from the Conservative Action Project asking state legislatures in the battleground states of Pennsylvania, Arizona, Georgia, Wisconsin, Nevada, and Michigan to "exercise their plenary power under the Constitution" to overturn Joe Biden's victory by appointing pro-Trump slates of electors to the Electoral College.

== Personal life ==
Perkins is married to Lawana Perkins (née Lee), with whom he has five children. As part of the U.S. Commission on International Religious Freedom's Religious Prisoners of Conscience Project, Perkins symbolically adopted Nigerian schoolgirl Leah Sharibu, who was abducted by Boko Haram in 2018 after refusing to renounce her Christian faith, in order to advocate for her release. As of 2026, Sharibu remains a hostage of Boko Haram.

He has been affiliated with the National Rifle Association of America, the American Legion, the Christian Coalition, and the Baton Rouge Rescue Mission. Perkins served as president of the Council for National Policy.

Perkins' family was affected by the 2016 Louisiana floods, and had to evacuate their Louisiana home by canoe.

Louisiana House of Representatives
Preceded by Mike McCleary	Member of the Louisiana House of Representatives from the 64th district 1996–2004	Succeeded by Bodi White
Non-profit organization positions
Preceded by Kenneth L. Connor	President of the Family Research Council; 2003–present	Incumbent
