= Fred S. LeBlanc =

American politician

Louisiana Attorney General
- In office 1944–1948
- Governor: Jimmie Davis
- Preceded by: Eugene Stanley
- Succeeded by: Bolivar Edwards Kemp, Jr.
- In office May 1952 – May 1956
- Governor: Robert F. Kennon
- Preceded by: Bolivar Edwards Kemp, Jr.
- Succeeded by: Jack P. F. Gremillion

Mayor of Baton Rouge, Louisiana
- In office 1941–1944
- Preceded by: W. H. Bynum
- Succeeded by: Powers Higginbotham

Judge of the Louisiana 19th Judicial District court
- In office April 11, 1958 – June 11, 1969
- Succeeded by: John S. Covington

Personal details
- Born: July 24, 1897 near Baton Rouge, Louisiana
- Died: June 11, 1969 (aged 71) Baton Rouge, Louisiana
- Party: Democratic
- Education: Louisiana State University Law Center
- Occupation: Attorney

Frederick Saugrain LeBlanc Sr. (July 24, 1897 – June 11, 1969), was an American politician in the US state of Louisiana who was Louisiana attorney general from 1944 to 1948 and from 1952 to 1956. He was a member of the Democratic Party.
