= William J. Guste =

American attorney and politician

William Joseph Guste Jr.

Louisiana Attorney General
- In office May 9, 1972 – January 13, 1992
- Governor: Edwin Edwards (1972–1980; 1984–1988); Dave Treen (1980–1984); Buddy Roemer (1988–1992)
- Preceded by: Jack P. F. Gremillion
- Succeeded by: Richard Ieyoub

Louisiana State Senator from Orleans Parish
- In office 1968–1972
- Preceded by: At-large election of eight senators
- Succeeded by: Fritz H. Windhorst

Personal details
- Born: May 26, 1922 New Orleans, Louisiana
- Died: July 24, 2013 (aged 91) New Orleans
- Party: Democratic
- Education: Loyola University New Orleans; Loyola University New Orleans College of Law
- Occupation: Attorney; businessman

Military service
- Allegiance: United States
- Branch/service: United States Army
- Battles/wars: World War II in France

William Joseph Guste Jr. (May 26, 1922 – July 24, 2013) was an American attorney and politician from the state of Louisiana. He was Attorney General of Louisiana from 1972 to 1992.

Party political offices
Preceded by Jack Gremillion	Democratic nominee for Attorney General of Louisiana; 1972, 1983	Succeeded by Richard Ieyoub
Legal offices
Preceded by Jack P.F. Gremillion	Louisiana Attorney General; 1972–1992	Succeeded by Richard Ieyoub
Louisiana State Senate
Preceded by At-large: eight state senators from Orleans Parish	Louisiana State Senator from Orleans Parish; 1968–1972	Succeeded by Fritz Windhorst
