= Jack Gremillion =

Louisiana Attorney General

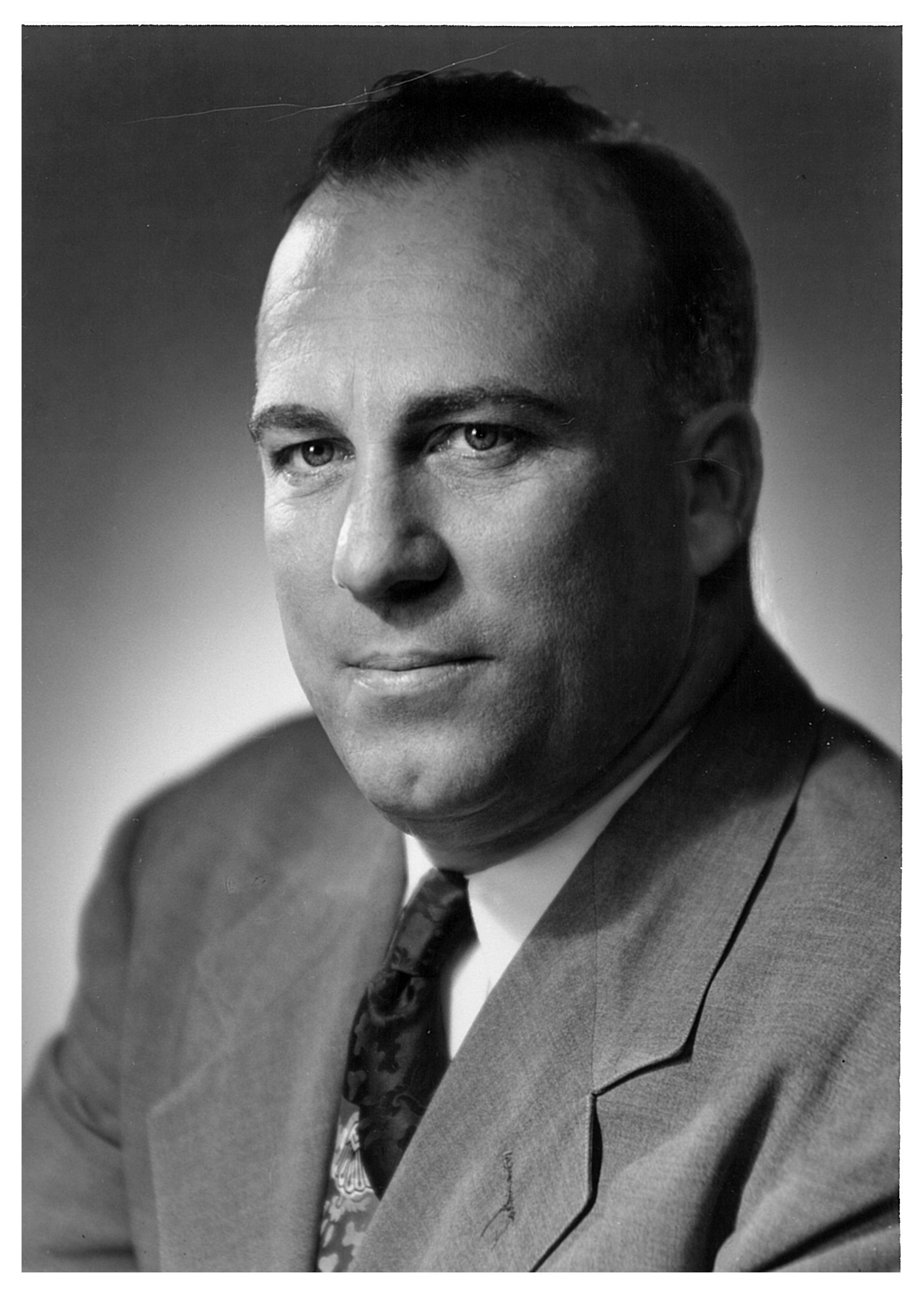
- Gremillion in 1956

Attorney General of Louisiana
- In office May 1956 – May 1972
- Governor: Earl K. Long; Jimmie Davis; John McKeithen
- Preceded by: Fred S. Leblanc
- Succeeded by: William J. Guste

Personal details
- Born: Jack Paul Faustin Gremillion; June 5, 1914 Ascension Parish, Louisiana, U.S.
- Died: March 2, 2001 (aged 86) Baton Rouge, Louisiana, U.S.
- Party: Democratic
- Spouse: Doris McDonald Gremillion (married 1942-1989, her death)
- Children: 5
- Education: Louisiana State University (BA); LSU Law Center (JD)
- Profession: Attorney

Jack Paul Faustin Gremillion (June 15, 1914 – March 2, 2001) was the Democratic Attorney General of Louisiana from 1956 to 1972. Gremillion served "an unprecedented 16 years as the state's attorney general." He was widely known for his political partnership with Governor Earl Long.

== Early life ==
Gremillion was born on June 5, 1914, in Donaldsonville, Louisiana, to parents, William Kossuth Gremillion (1881–1939) and Genoa Henderson Gremillion (1892–1969). His father was a telegraph operator and his mother was a teacher. Jack attended high school in his hometown of Donaldsonville at Ascension Catholic High School. Due to Gremillion's French descent, he and his family spoke French fluently. Coming from meager family means, with four siblings, he worked his way through college mainly at Solvay Chemical in Baton Rouge. He studied law under the tutelage of Fred S. LeBlanc, then a practicing attorney in Baton Rouge and later the attorney general whom Gremillion unseated. Thereafter, Gremillion was admitted to the practice of law and was a member of the American Bar Association. Gremillion was noted for his short stature, quick mind, and intractable will.

== Law career ==
Upon graduating from Louisiana State University with a bachelor's degree, Gremillion attended LSU Law. Gremillion worked in the local district attorney's office and was mentored by Fred S. Leblanc, whom he later succeeded as Attorney General of Louisiana. Gremillion was a member of the American Bar Association. However, his law career took a pause when he served in World War II through the United States Army. After the war, Gremillion continued his law career and worked as a prosecutor.

== Military ==
Landing on D-day +4 in Normandy, Gremillion was an Infantry Company Commander, Company L, (3rd BN) Second Infantry Regiment, 5th Infantry Division in World War II. He was severely wounded near Le Perron, France in what is termed the hedge wars, leading his Company in the assault of St. Lo.

He was wounded by gunshot while leaning over to help a fallen infantry man. Field medics passed Gremillion for dead, saying his wounds were too severe. Gremillion was able to put his fluency in French to good use, and was rescued by a French farmer in the Le Perron area. Gremillion received a Purple Heart for his bravery during World War II.

== Political career ==
Gremillion's rise to Attorney General of Louisiana followed a unique progression. Earl Long tapped Gremillion to succeed his long-time mentor Fred S. Leblanc during his uncle's funeral, where Gremillion was attending as a pallbearer. Soon after, Gremillion defeated Leblanc and became Attorney General in 1952. Gremillion went on to serve four consecutive terms as Attorney General of Louisiana.

As attorney general, he led Louisiana's tidelands litigation — the setting of maritime boundaries for oil exploration on the Louisiana coastal zone between the state and federal levels, implicating the oil and gas industry. The tidelands litigation was a protracted legal battle implicating the fluctuations in Louisiana's wetlands as a boundary, the Louisiana purchases' boundaries, and ultimately where the revenues from taxing offshore exploration would be directed.

In describing the dispute, Gremillion is quoted as saying, "Our first responsibility is to protect the three million stockholders in the corporation known as the State of Louisiana." He quickly rallied public sentiment behind the defense of Louisiana's cause. First, the attorney general argued, the court's inquiry into foreign policy regarding the tidelands was unconstitutional. Second, the Supreme Court "is not authorized by the Constitution to entertain an original suit between the United States and a state." Finally, Gremillion asserted, "Louisiana has sovereign immunity from suit unless it gives its consent, and the state has not consented to be sued by the United States." Following protracted litigation, in 1986, the state of Louisiana was awarded $540 million "in reparation for past actions by the fed", said John Broussard, assistant state treasurer and chief investment officer. "The state’s 8(g) fund receives yearly royalty payments between 10 and 36 million dollars. In total, the educational fund has received about 1.5 billion dollars."

== Perjury charge ==
In 1969, Gremillion was indicted on federal charges of fraud and conspiracy in connection with the bankrupt Louisiana Loan and Thrift Co. He was found not guilty of all charges. But in 1971 he was convicted of perjury and sentenced to three years in prison. He was paroled after serving fifteen months in a federal facility. He declined to resign his office and ran for re-election again, but lost in the Democratic primary.

Party political offices
Preceded by Fred S. LeBlanc	Democratic nominee for Attorney General of Louisiana; 1956, 1960, 1964, 1968	Succeeded by William J. Guste
Legal offices
Preceded by Fred S. LeBlanc	Louisiana Attorney General; 1956–1972	Succeeded by William J. Guste
