= Buddy Caldwell =

American attorney and politician

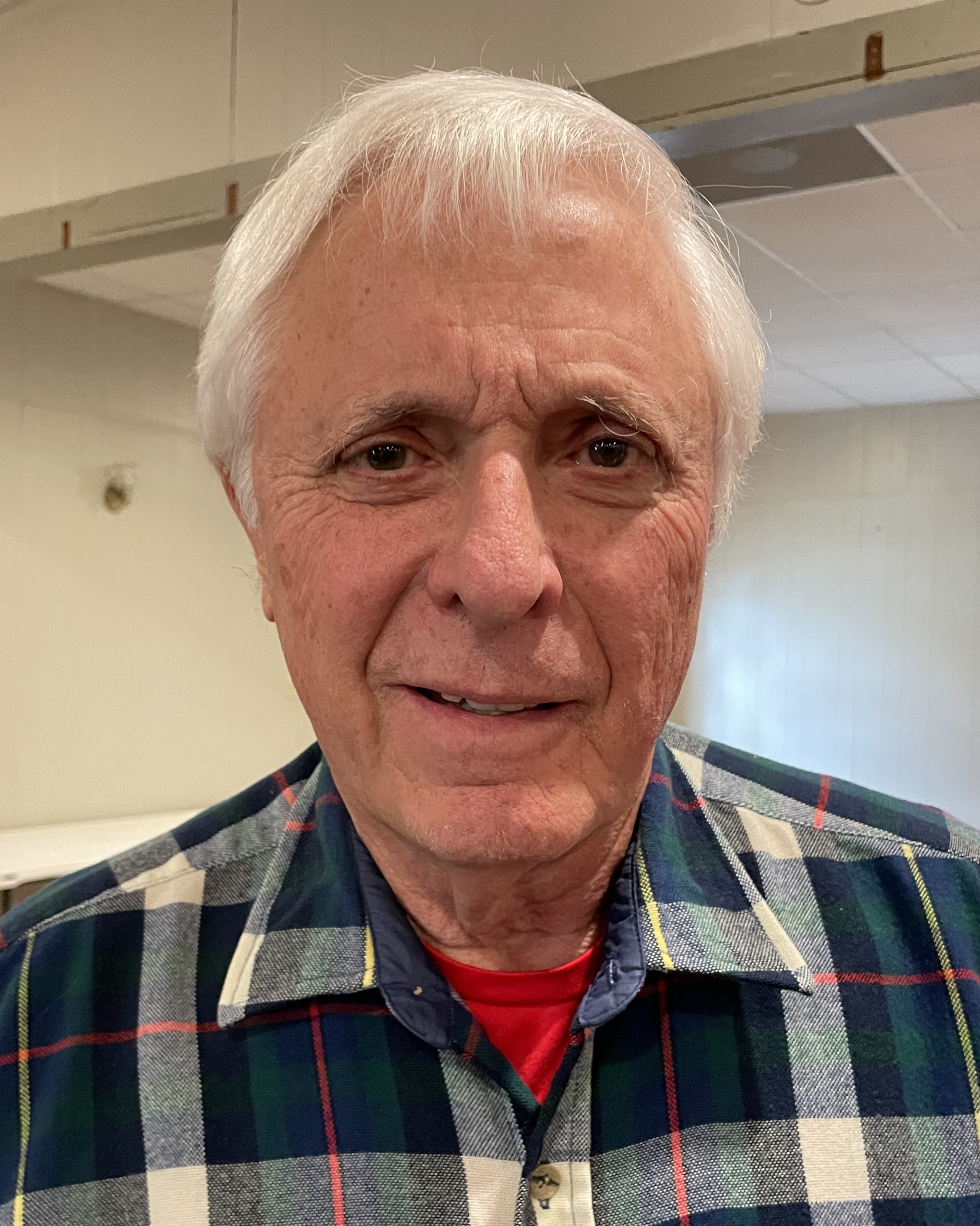

44th Attorney General of Louisiana
- In office January 14, 2008 – January 11, 2016
- Governor: Bobby Jindal
- Preceded by: Charles Foti
- Succeeded by: Jeff Landry

Personal details
- Born: James David Caldwell; May 20, 1946 (age 80) Columbia, Louisiana, U.S
- Party: Democratic (before 2011); Republican (2011–present)
- Spouse: Pat Caldwell (third wife)
- Children: 7 (including stepchildren)
- Education: Tulane University (BA, JD)

James David "Buddy" Caldwell Sr. (born May 20, 1946) is an American attorney and politician from the state of Louisiana. He served as Attorney General of Louisiana from 2008 to 2016.

== Career ==
Caldwelll was elected Attorney General of Louisiana elected as a Democrat in 2007, defeating Republican Royal Alexander. He became a member of the Republican Party in 2011. Prior to his party switch, he was the only Democratic state attorney general to challenge the constitutionality of the Affordable Care Act (ACA).

Caldwell was reelected in the 2011 Attorney General election without opposition after his sole opponent, former U.S. Representative Joseph Cao, dropped out of the race.

Caldwell lost his 2015 reelection bid to Republican Jeff Landry. In 2018, the interim mayor of Tallulah, Louisiana, appointed Caldwell as interim city attorney.

In 2008, the murder conviction of Angola inmate Albert Woodfox was overturned by a federal judge. Caldwell appealed the decision to overturn Woodfox's conviction, despite significant evidence that Woodfox had not committed the crime. Woodfox speculated that Caldwell may have been using the appeal in order to gain public attention for himself as the recently appointed Attorney General of Louisiana. When questioned in an interview by NPR's Laura Sullivan about a bloody fingerprint found at the scene of the crime that was proven not to belong to Woodfox, Caldwell replied, "A fingerprint can come from anywhere."

=== Deepwater Horizon oil spill litigation ===
In 2010, following the Deepwater Horizon oil spill, Caldwell directed Louisiana’s legal response and the state’s participation in the federal multidistrict litigation, MDL No. 2179, before Judge Carl Barbier of the United States District Court for the Eastern District of Louisiana. A state district judge granted his office investigative authority over BP in June 2010, including access to information about the spill and BP’s claims process. Governor Bobby Jindal allocated funding from a BP block grant to the attorney general’s office to support investigation and expert work.

During the structuring of MDL 2179, Caldwell objected to an initial order appointing Alabama Attorney General Luther Strange as coordinating counsel for all Gulf Coast states, stating that each state should control its own sovereign claims. On January 18, 2012, Judge Barbier issued Pretrial Order No. 48, designating Caldwell as Co-Coordinating Counsel for State Interests, which formalized Louisiana’s leadership role in the litigation.

Caldwell’s office pursued Louisiana’s claims for natural resource damages, economic losses and civil penalties under the Oil Pollution Act of 1990 and the Clean Water Act. He also petitioned the United States Court of Appeals for the Fifth Circuit challenging MDL holdback orders that reserved a percentage of state recoveries to fund common-benefit legal fees.

In July 2015, the United States and the five Gulf Coast states announced a proposed global settlement with BP. The agreement was finalized in 2016 with the entry of a federal consent decree, which included signatures from both Governor Jindal and Caldwell. The settlement provided Louisiana with several billion dollars in natural resource restoration funding, economic damages and civil penalties distributed over multiple decades.

== See also ==
- List of Jewish American jurists
- List of American politicians who switched parties in office

Party political offices
Preceded by Charles Foti	Democratic nominee for Attorney General of Louisiana; 2007	Vacant Title next held by Ike Jackson
Preceded by Royal Alexander	Republican nominee for Attorney General of Louisiana; 2011	Succeeded by Jeff Landry
Legal offices
Preceded by Charles Foti	Attorney General of Louisiana; 2008–2016	Succeeded by Jeff Landry
