= 2002 United States Senate election in Louisiana =

- November 5, 2002 (first round); December 7, 2002 (runoff)
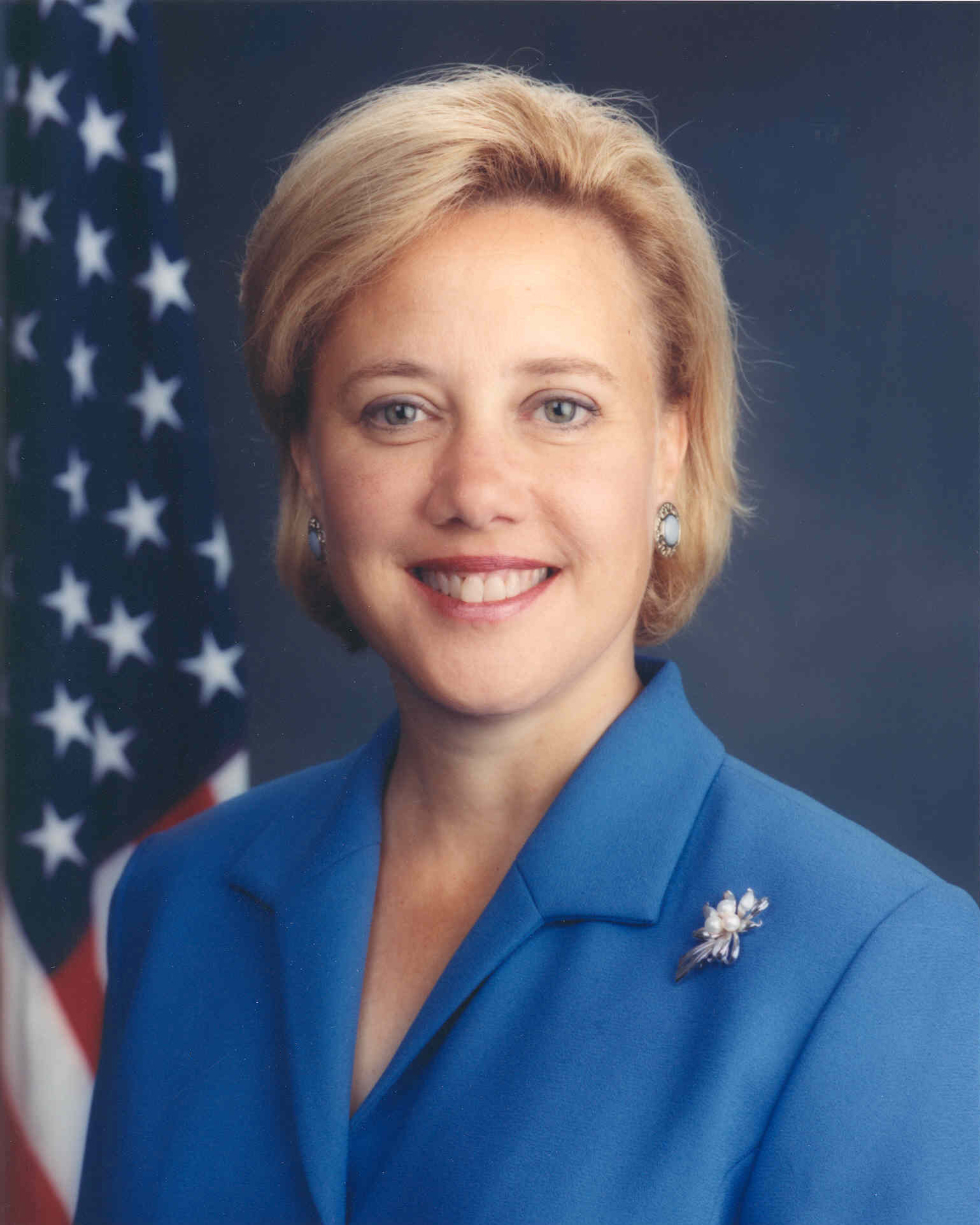

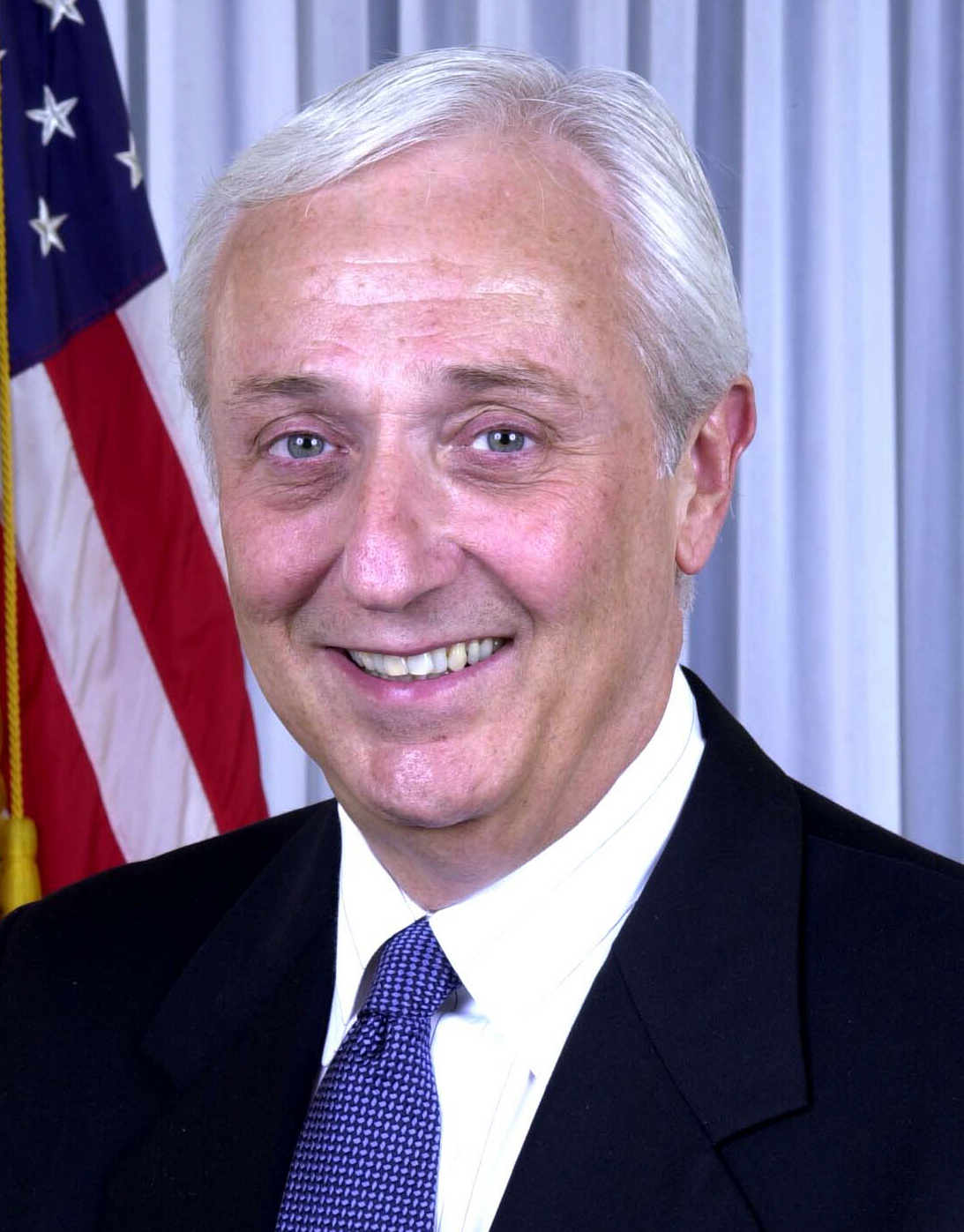

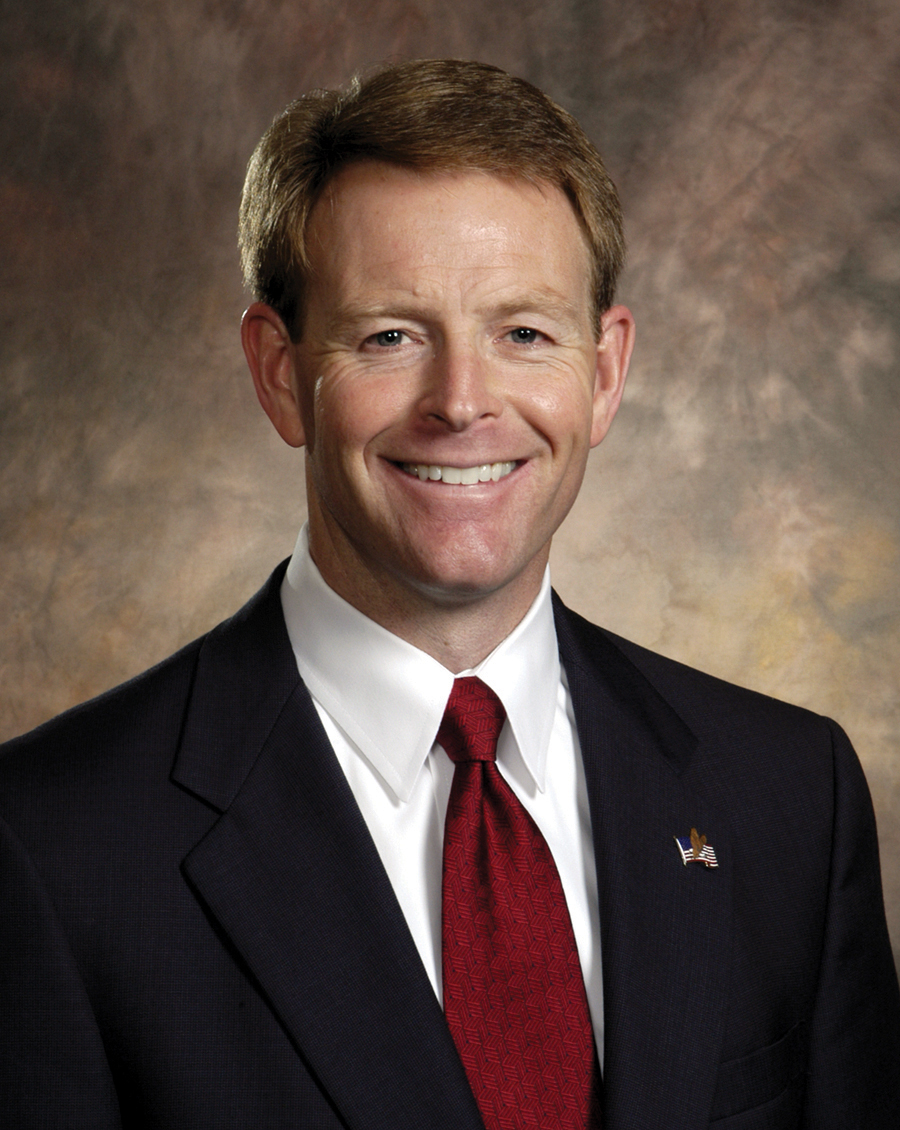
Nominee	Mary Landrieu	Suzanne Haik Terrell
Party	Democratic	Republican
First round	573,347; 46.00%	339,506; 27.24%
Runoff	638,654; 51.70%	596,642; 48.30%
Nominee	John Cooksey	Tony Perkins
Party	Republican	Republican
First round	171,752; 13.78%	119,776; 9.61%
Runoff	Eliminated	Eliminated
- Landrieu: 30–40% 40–50% 50–60% 60–70% 70–80% Terrell: 40–50% 50–60% 60–70% Cooksey: 30–40% 40–50% 60–70%
U.S. senator before election
Mary Landrieu
Democratic
Elected U.S. Senator
Mary Landrieu
Democratic

The 2002 United States Senate election in Louisiana was held on November 5, 2002. Incumbent Democratic U.S. Senator Mary Landrieu won re-election to a second term, although she did not earn 50% of the vote in the first round and was therefore forced into a runoff election with Republican Suzanne Haik Terrell, the Louisiana elections commissioner.

During the runoff, Landrieu was outspent three-to-one by Terrell, who also had prominent Republicans including President George W. Bush and Vice President Dick Cheney visit Louisiana to campaign on her behalf. Republicans, confident of victory having gained seats in the elections to the House of Representatives and to the Senate, solidifying control of the former and taking control of the latter, publicly called the election "Operation Icing on the Cake". Some Democrats responded by calling their efforts "Operation Wipe that Smirk off of Bush's Face" and dubbed Landrieu's subsequent run-off victory, "Operation Pie in the Face".

This was one of the four Democratic-held Senate seats up for election in a state that George W. Bush won in the 2000 presidential election.

== Candidates ==
=== Democratic ===
- Raymond Brown
- Mary Landrieu, incumbent U.S. senator

=== Republican ===
- John Cooksey, U.S. representative
- Tony Perkins, state representative
- Ernest Edward Skillman
- Suzanne Haik Terrell, Louisiana elections commissioner

=== Independents ===
- Live Wire Landry
- James Lemann
- Gary D. Robbins

== Primary results ==
Louisiana United States Senate jungle primary election, November 5, 2002
Party	Candidate	Votes	%	±%
Democratic	Mary Landrieu (incumbent)	573,347	46.00%	
Republican	Suzanne Haik Terrell	339,506	27.24%	
Republican	John Cooksey	171,752	13.78%	
Republican	Tony Perkins	119,776	9.61%	
Democratic	Raymond Brown	23,553	1.89%	
Independent	Patrick E. "Live Wire" Landry	10,442	0.84%	
Independent	James Lemann	3,866	0.31%	
Libertarian	Gary D. Robbins	2,423	0.19%	
Republican	Ernest Edward Skillman, Jr.	1,668	0.13%	
Turnout		1,246,333	100.00%	

== Runoff ==
=== Debates (jungle primary and runoff) ===
- Complete video of debate, October 24, 2002
- Complete video of debate, October 28, 2002
- Complete video of debate, October 29, 2002
- Complete video of debate, November 17, 2002
- Complete video of debate, November 21, 2002
- Complete video of debate, November 25, 2002
- Complete video of debate, December 2, 2002

=== Predictions ===
Source	Ranking	As of
Sabato's Crystal Ball	Lean D	November 4, 2002

=== Results ===
Louisiana United States Senate election runoff, December 7, 2002
Party	Candidate	Votes	%	±%
Democratic	Mary Landrieu (incumbent)	638,654	51.70%	+1.53%
Republican	Suzanne Haik Terrell	596,642	48.30%	−1.53%
Majority		42,012	3.40%	+3.06%
Turnout		1,235,296	100.00%	
Democratic hold		Swing		

Parishes that flipped from Republican to Democratic

- Cameron (largest community: Grand Lake)
- Catahoula (largest town: Jonesville)
- East Baton Rouge (largest city: Baton Rouge)
- Evangeline (largest city: Ville Platte)
- Jefferson Davis (largest city: Jennings)
- Morehouse (largest city: Bastrop)
- Saint Martin (largest city: Breaux Bridge)
- Saint Landry (largest city: Opelousas)
- Washington (largest city: Bogalusa)

== Analysis ==
Landrieu pulled off what many considered to be an upset victory. The Republicans believed they would most likely win the race. Before the election, many Republicans called the race "Operation Icing on the Cake." After Landrieu won the runoff Democrats dubbed her victory "Operation Pie in the Face." The race was close. In terms of rural parishes, the vote was split fairly evenly. Landrieu did well in Caddo Parish, home of Shreveport, and in East Baton Rouge Parish, home of Baton Rouge. Ultimately, it was Landrieu's huge win in Orleans Parish home of New Orleans that pushed her over the finish line. Haik Terrell conceded defeat to Landrieu at 12:38 P.M. EST, congratulating Landrieu on her victory. Landrieu would go on to be reelected to a third term in 2008, but was defeated in her bid for a fourth term in 2014.

== See also ==
- 2002 United States Senate elections
