= List of Louisiana attorneys general =

The office of attorney general of Louisiana (French: Procureur général de la Louisiane) has existed since the colonial period. Under Article IV, Section 8 of the Constitution of Louisiana, the attorney general is elected statewide for a four-year term and is the chief legal officer of the state. Additionally, "the attorney general shall have authority (1) to institute, prosecute, or intervene in any civil action or proceeding; (2) upon the written request of a district attorney, to advise and assist in the prosecution of any criminal case; and (3) for cause, when authorized by the court which would have original jurisdiction and subject to judicial review, (a) to institute, prosecute, or intervene in any criminal action or proceeding, or (b) to supersede any attorney representing the state in any civil or criminal action.

The attorney general shall exercise other powers and perform other duties authorized by this constitution or by law."

The current attorney general, Liz Murrill has been in office since January 8, 2024.

== Territory of Orleans (1804–1812) ==
- John Mahlon Dickens 1804–1807
- James Brown 1807–1809
- Francois Xavier Martin 1809–1810
- Louis Moreau-Lislet 1810–1812

== State of Louisiana (1812–present) ==
#	Image	Name	Political party	Term of office
1		Francois Xavier Martin	Democratic-Republican	1812–1815
2		Etienne Mazureau	Democratic-Republican	1815–1817
3		Louis Moreau-Lislet	Democratic-Republican	1817–1819
4		Thomas B. Robertson	Democratic-Republican	1819–1821
5		Etienne Mazureau	Democratic-Republican	1821–1824
6		Isaac Trimble Preston		1824–1828
7		Alonzo Morphy		1828–1830
8		George Eustis, Sr.	National Republican	1830–1833
9		Etienne Mazureau	Whig	1833–1841
10		Christian Roselius	Whig	1841–1843
11		Isaac Trimble Preston		1843–1846
12		William Augustus Elmore		1846-1850
13		Isaac Johnson	Democratic	1850–1854
14		Isaac Edward Morse	Democratic	1854–1856
15		E. Warren Moise	Democratic	1856–1860
16		Thomas Jenkins Semmes	Democratic	1860–1864
17		Flavillus Sidney Goode	Democratic	1864–1865
18		Andrew S. Herron	Democratic	1865
19		B. L. Lynch	Republican	1865–1867
20		Simeon Belden	Republican	1868–1871
21		Alexander Pope Field	Republican	1872–1876
22		William H. Hunt	Republican	1876
23		Hiram R. Steele	Republican	1876–1877
24		Horatio Nash Ogden	Democratic	1877–1880
25		James C. Egan	Democratic	1880–1884
26		Milton Joseph Cunningham	Democratic	1884–1888
27		Walter Henry Rogers	Democratic	1888–1892
28		Milton Joseph Cunningham	Democratic	1892–1900
29		Walter Guion	Democratic	1900–1912
30		Ruffin G. Pleasant	Democratic	1912–1916
31		Adolphe V. Coco	Democratic	1916–1924
32		Percy Saint	Democratic	1924–1932
33		Gaston L. Porterie	Democratic	1932–1939
34		James B. Ellison	Democratic	1939
35		Lessley P. Gardiner	Democratic	1939–1940
36		Eugene Stanley	Democratic	1940–1944
37		Fred S. LeBlanc	Democratic	1944–1948
38		Bolivar Edwards Kemp, Jr.	Democratic	1948–1952
39		Fred S. LeBlanc	Democratic	1952–1956
40		Jack P.F. Gremillion	Democratic	1956–1972
41		William J. Guste	Democratic	1972–1992
42		Richard Ieyoub	Democratic	1992–2004
43		Charles Foti	Democratic	2004–2008
44		James D. "Buddy" Caldwell	Democratic	2008–2011
44		James D. "Buddy" Caldwell	Republican	2011–2016
45		Jeff Landry	Republican	2016–2024
46		Liz Murrill	Republican	2024–present
