= Henry B. Lee =

American politician

Henry Lee

Member-elect of the U.S. House of Representatives from New York's 4th district
- Died before taking office
- Preceded by: Abraham H. Schenck
- Succeeded by: James Tallmadge Jr.

Personal details
- Born: Henry Bird Lee; 1781 Greene County, New York, U.S.
- Died: September 16, 1816 (aged 34–35)
- Party: Democratic-Republican

Henry Bird Lee (1781 – September 16, 1816) was an American lawyer and politician.

Born in Greene County, New York, Lee practiced law in Patterson, New York. In 1815, Lee served in the New York State Assembly. In 1816, Lee was elected as a Democratic-Republican to the United States House of Representatives; Lee died before he took office.

== See also ==
- List of United States representatives-elect who never took their seats

== Notes ==
U.S. House of Representatives
Preceded by Abraham H. Schenck	Member-elect of the U.S. House of Representatives from New York's 4th congressional district 1816	Succeeded by James Tallmadge Jr.
