= Andrew S. Herron =

American lawyer (1823–1882)

Andrew Herron

Member-elect of the U.S. House of Representatives from Louisiana's 4th district
- Died before taking office
- Preceded by: Newton C. Blanchard
- Succeeded by: Newton C. Blanchard

Attorney General of Louisiana
- In office 1865
- Governor: Henry Allen
- Preceded by: Flavillus Goode
- Succeeded by: B. L. Lynch

Secretary of State of Louisiana
- In office 1852–1859
- Governor: Paul Hébert; Robert Wickliffe
- Preceded by: Charles Gayarré
- Succeeded by: Pliny Hardy

Personal details
- Born: Andrew Stewart Herron; October 27, 1823 Nashville, Tennessee, U.S.
- Died: November 27, 1882 (aged 59) Baton Rouge, Louisiana, U.S.
- Party: Democratic

Andrew Stewart Herron (October 27, 1823 – November 27, 1882) was an American lawyer, politician, and military officer.

Born in Nashville, Tennessee, Herron was a banker and lawyer in Baton Rouge, Louisiana. He served as Secretary of State of Louisiana from 1852 to 1859. Herron served as a delegate to the Louisiana Secession Convention and then in the Confederate Army where he served as a military judge in Mobile, Alabama. In 1865, Herron was elected Louisiana Attorney General. Herron was in elected to the United States House of Representatives in 1882 and died on November 27, 1882, in Baton Rouge, Louisiana, before he took the oath of office.

== See also ==
- List of United States representatives-elect who never took their seats

== Notes ==
Political offices
Preceded by Charles Gayarré	Secretary of State of Louisiana; 1852–1859	Succeeded by Pliny Hardy
Legal offices
Preceded by Flavillus Goode	Attorney General of Louisiana; 1865	Succeeded by B. L. Lynch
U.S. House of Representatives
Preceded by Newton C. Blanchard	Member-elect of the U.S. House of Representatives from Louisiana's 4th congressional district 1882	Succeeded by Newton C. Blanchard
