= Missouri Compromise =

1820 United States federal legislation

- Long title: An Act to authorize the people of the Missouri territory to form a constitution and state government, and for the admission of such state into the Union on an equal footing with the original states, and to prohibit slavery in certain territories
- Nicknames: Compromise of 1820
- Enacted by: the 16th United States Congress
- Effective: March 6, 1820

Citations
- Statutes at Large: 3 Stat. 545

Codification
- Acts repealed: Kansas–Nebraska Act (1854)

Legislative history
- Introduced in the Senate by Jesse B. Thomas; Committee consideration by Conference Committee on the Missouri Bill; Signed into law by President James Monroe on March 6, 1820

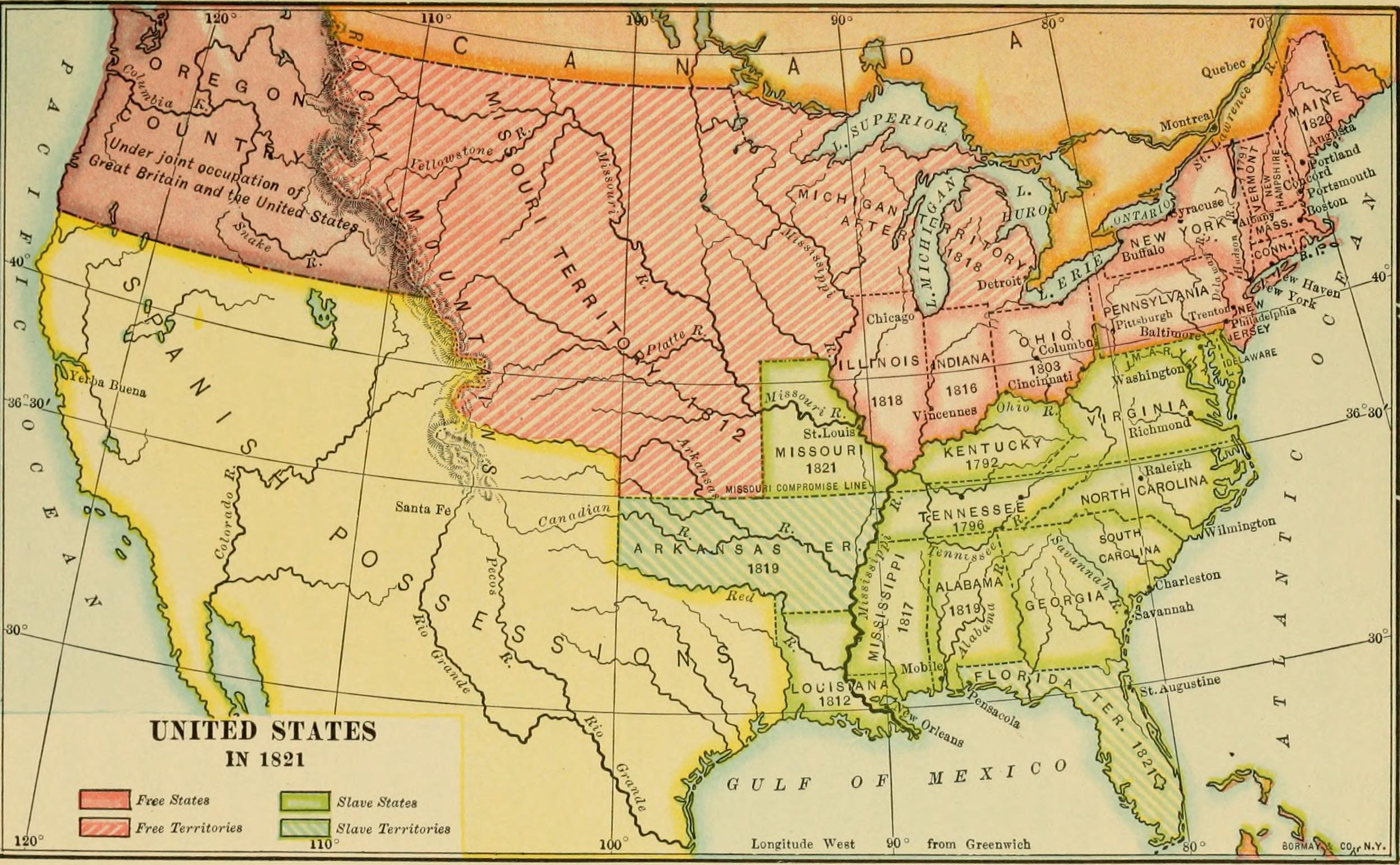
Map showing the division of free and slave territory in the United States as a result of the Missouri Compromise

The Missouri Compromise (Note: An act to authorize the people of the Missouri territory to form a constitution and state government, and for the admission of such state into the Union on an equal footing with the original states, and to prohibit slavery in certain territories, Pub. L. 16–22, 3 Stat. 545, enacted March 6, 1820) (also known as the Compromise of 1820) was federal legislation of the United States that balanced the desires of some northern states to prevent the expansion of slavery in the country with those of southern states to expand it. It admitted Missouri as a slave state and Maine as a free state and declared a policy of prohibiting slavery in the remaining Louisiana Purchase lands north of the 36°30′ parallel. The 16th United States Congress passed the legislation on March 3, 1820, and President James Monroe signed it on March 6, 1820.

Earlier, in February 1819, Representative James Tallmadge Jr., a Democratic-Republican from New York, had submitted two amendments to Missouri's request for statehood that included restrictions on slavery. While the slave states earlier claimed federal protection for slavery, they now objected to any bill that imposed federal restrictions on slavery and claimed that it was a state issue, as settled by the Constitution. However, with the Senate evenly split at the opening of the debates, both sections possessing 11 states, the admission of Missouri as a slave state would give the South an advantage. Northern critics including Federalists and Democratic-Republicans objected to the expansion of slavery into the Louisiana Purchase territory on the Constitutional inequalities of the three-fifths rule, which conferred Southern representation in the federal government derived from a state's slave population.

Northern Democratic-Republicans ardently maintained that a strict interpretation of the Constitution required that Congress act to limit the spread of slavery on egalitarian grounds. "[Northern] Republicans rooted their antislavery arguments, not on expediency, but in egalitarian morality." "The Constitution [said northern Democratic-Republicans], strictly interpreted, gave the sons of the founding generation the legal tools to hasten [the] removal [of slavery], including the refusal to admit additional slave states."

When free-soil Maine offered its petition for statehood, the Senate quickly linked the Maine and Missouri bills, making Maine's admission a condition for Missouri entering the Union as a slave state. Senator Jesse B. Thomas of Illinois added a compromise provision that banned slavery from all remaining lands of the Louisiana Purchase north of the 36° 30' parallel. The combined measures passed the Senate, only to be voted down in the House by Northern representatives who held out for a free Missouri. Speaker of the House Henry Clay of Kentucky, in a desperate bid to break the deadlock, divided the Senate bills. Clay and his pro-compromise allies succeeded in pressuring half of the anti-restrictionist Southerners in the House to submit to the passage of the Thomas proviso and maneuvered a number of restrictionist northerners in the House to acquiesce in supporting Missouri as a slave state. While the Missouri question in the 15th Congress ended in stalemate on March 4, 1819, with the House sustaining its northern anti-slavery position and the Senate blocking a state that restricted slavery, it succeeded in the 16th Congress.

The Missouri Compromise was controversial. While it mollified most people at the time and settled the issue for more than 20 years, many worried that the country had become lawfully divided along regional and sectarian lines. Tensions resumed in the 1840s and the Compromise of 1850 only briefly defused the situation. The Kansas–Nebraska Act effectively repealed the bill in 1854, and the Supreme Court declared the Missouri Compromise unconstitutional in Dred Scott v. Sandford (1857), both of which increased tensions over slavery and contributed to the American Civil War. The compromise both delayed the Civil War and sowed its seeds; in April 1820, Thomas Jefferson predicted the line as drawn would someday tear the Union apart. Forty years later, the North and South would split closely along the 36°30′ parallel and launch the Civil War.

== Background ==
=== Era of Good Feelings ===
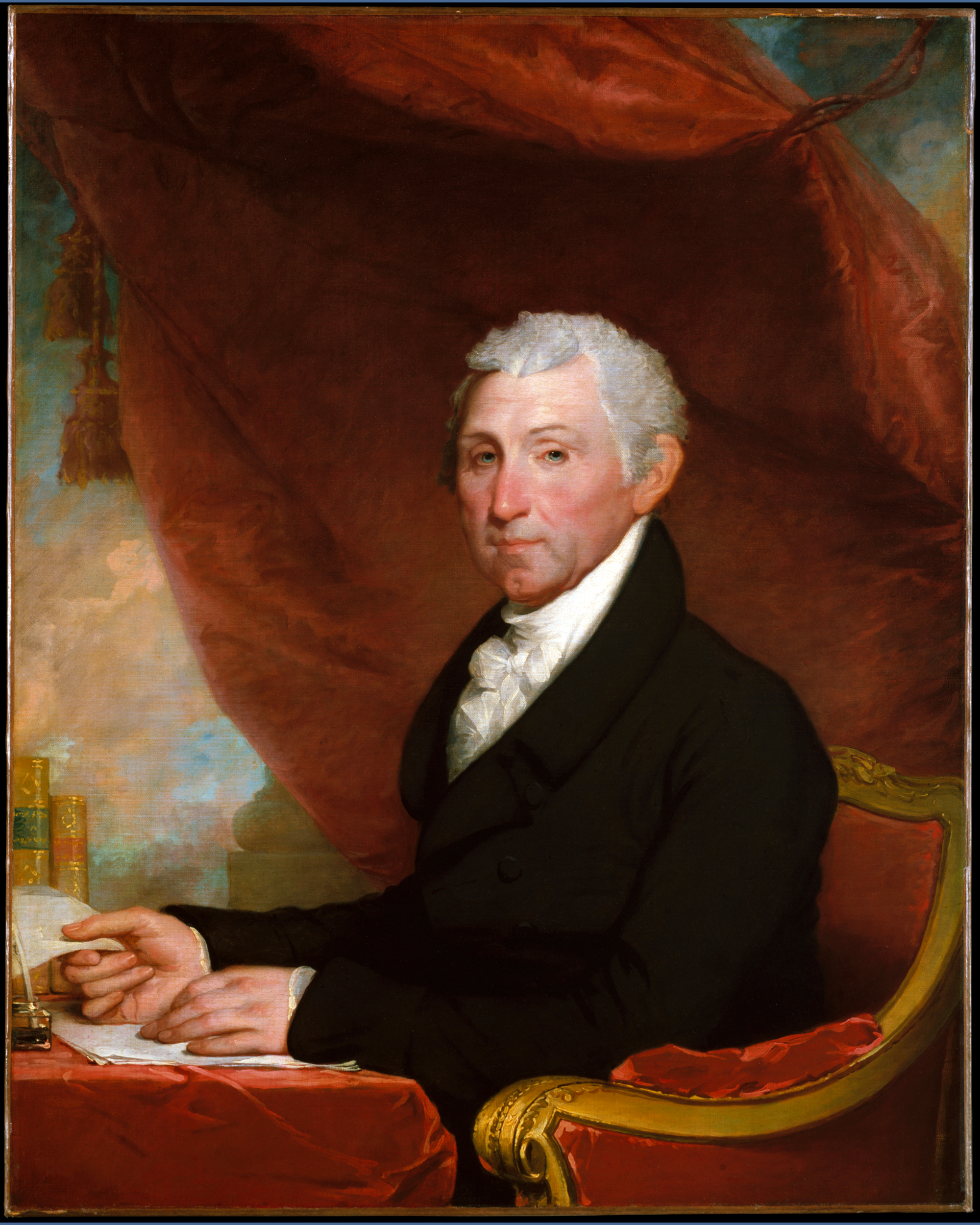
President James Monroe, who signed the Missouri Compromise

The Era of Good Feelings, closely associated with the administration of President James Monroe (1817–1825), was characterized by the dissolution of national political identities. With the Federalists discredited by the Hartford Convention against the War of 1812, they were in decline nationally, and the "amalgamated" or hybridized Democratic-Republicans adopted key Federalist economic programs and institutions, further erasing party identities and consolidating their victory.

The economic nationalism of the Era of Good Feelings authorized the Tariff of 1816 and incorporated the Second Bank of the United States, which portended an abandonment of the Jeffersonian political formula for strict construction of the Constitution, a limited central government, and commitments to the primacy of Southern agrarian interests. The end of opposition parties also meant the end of party discipline and the means to suppress internecine factional animosities. Rather than produce political harmony, as President James Monroe had hoped, amalgamation had led to intense rivalries among Democratic-Republicans.

It was amid that period's "good feelings" during which Democratic-Republican Party discipline was in abeyance that the Tallmadge Amendment surfaced.

=== Louisiana Purchase and Missouri Territory ===
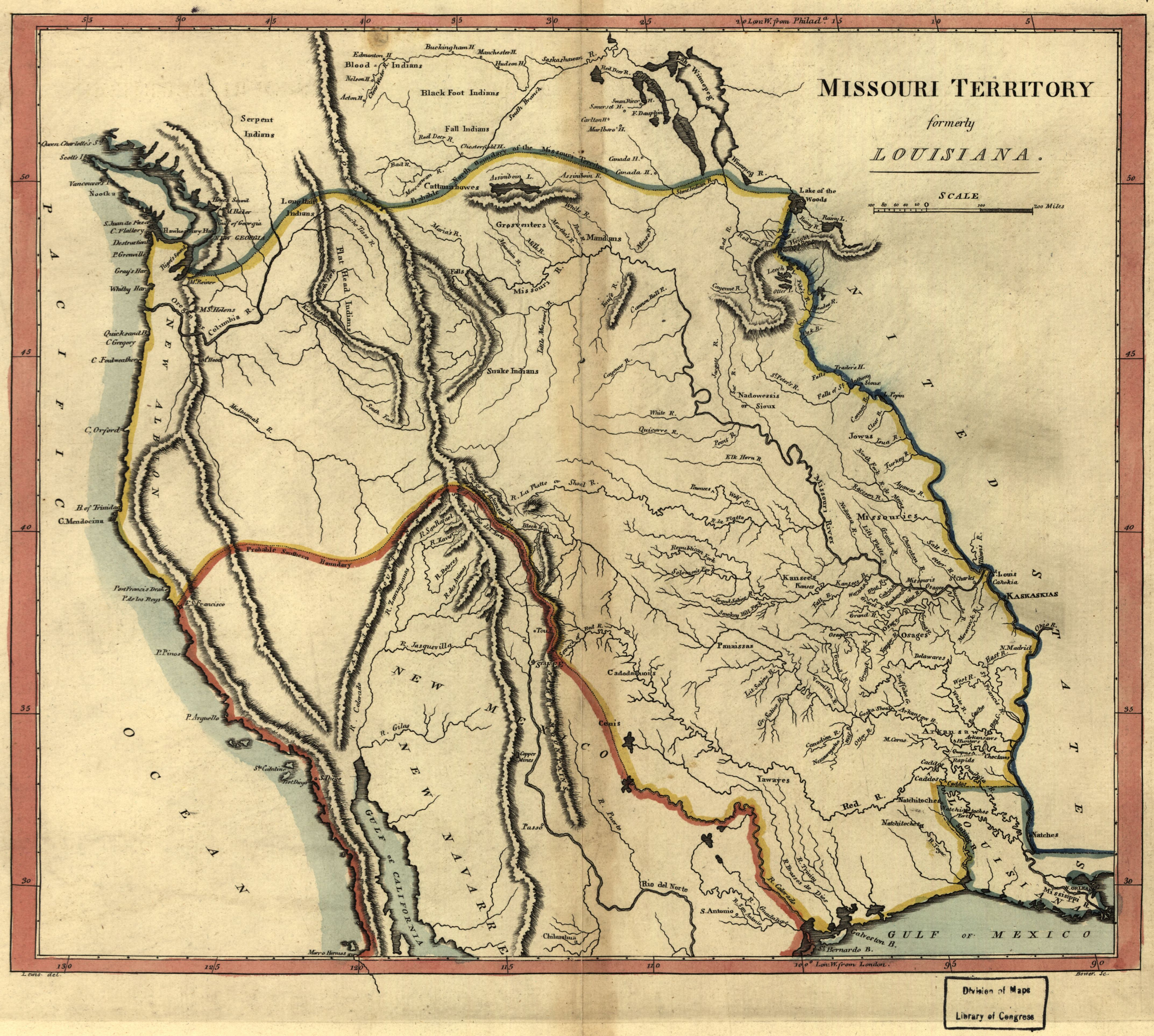
Map of the Missouri Territory (1814)

The immense Louisiana Purchase territories had been acquired through federal executive action, followed by Democratic-Republican legislative authorization in 1803 under President Thomas Jefferson.

Prior to its purchase in 1803, the governments of Spain and France had already sanctioned and promoted slavery in the region. Enslaved African Americans accounted for twenty to thirty percent of the non-Native American population in and around the main settlements of St. Louis and Ste. Genevieve. In 1804, Congress limited the further introduction of enslaved men and women to those introduced by actual settlers.

In addition, in appointing the officials from the Indiana Territory to Upper Louisiana (as Missouri was known until 1812), Congress heightened concerns that it intended to extend some sort of prohibition on slavery's growth across the river. White Missourians objected to these restrictions, and in 1805, Congress withdrew them. The final version of the 1805 territorial ordinance omitted all references to slavery. Under the 1805 ordinance, slavery existed legally in Missouri (which included all of the Louisiana Purchase outside of Louisiana) by force of local law and territorial statute, rather than by territorial ordinance, as was the case in other territories where slavery was permitted.

It is unknown if Congress purposely omitted any reference to slavery or Article VI in the 1805 territorial ordinance. Nonetheless, over the next fifteen years, some restrictionists – including Amos Stoddard – claimed that this omission was deliberate, intended to allow the United States government to prohibit slavery in Missouri if circumstances proved more favorable in the future.

In 1812, Louisiana, a major cotton producer and the first to be carved from the Louisiana Purchase, had entered the Union as a slave state. Predictably, Missourians were adamant that slave labor should not be molested by the federal government. In the years after the War of 1812, the region, now known as Missouri Territory, experienced rapid settlement, led by slaveholding planters.

Agriculturally, the land in the lower reaches of the Missouri River, from which that new state would be formed, had no prospects as a major cotton producer. Suited for diversified farming, the only crop regarded as promising for slave labor was hemp culture. On that basis, southern planters immigrated with their chattel to Missouri, and the slave population rose from 3,101 in 1810 to 10,000 in 1820. Out of the total population of 67,000, slaves represented about 15%.

By 1819, the population of Missouri Territory was approaching the threshold that would qualify it for statehood. An enabling act was provided to Congress empowering territorial residents to select convention delegates and draft a state constitution. The admission of Missouri Territory as a slave state was expected to be more-or-less routine.

=== Democratic-Republicans and slavery ===
Thomas Jefferson: The Missouri crisis roused Thomas Jefferson "like a fire bell in the night".

The Missouri crisis marked a rupture in the Democratic-Republican ascendency, the national association of Democratic-Republicans that had dominated federal politics since the War of 1812.

The Founding Fathers had inserted both principled and expedient elements in the establishing documents. The Declaration of Independence in 1776 had been grounded on the claim that liberty and equality were linked together as universal human rights. The Revolutionary generation had formed a government of limited powers in 1787 to embody the principles in the Declaration but "burdened with the one legacy that defied the principles of 1776", human bondage. In a pragmatic commitment to form the Union, the federal apparatus would forego any authority to interfere directly with the institution of slavery if it existed under local control by the states. The acknowledgment of state sovereignty provided for the participation of the states that were the most committed to slave labor. With that understanding, slaveholders had co-operated in authorizing the Northwest Ordinance in 1787 and outlawing the trans-Atlantic slave trade in 1808. The Founders sanctioned slavery but did so with the implicit understanding that the slave states would take steps to relinquish the institution as opportunities arose.

Southern states, after the American Revolutionary War, had regarded slavery as an institution in decline except for Georgia and South Carolina. That was manifest in the shift towards diversified farming in the Upper South; the gradual emancipation of slaves in New England and more significantly in Mid-Atlantic States. In the 1790s, with the introduction of the cotton gin, to 1815, with the vast increase in demand for cotton internationally, slave-based agriculture underwent an immense revival that spread the institution westward to the Mississippi River. Antislavery elements in the South vacillated, as did their hopes for the imminent demise of human bondage.

However rancorous the disputes were by southerners themselves over the virtues of a slave-based society, they united against external challenges to their institution. They believed that free states were not to meddle in the affairs of slave states. Southern leaders, virtually all of whom identified as Democratic-Republicans, denied that northerners had any business encroaching on matters related to slavery. Northern attacks on the institution were condemned as incitements to riot by slave populations, which was deemed to be a dire threat to white southerners' security.

Northern Democratic-Republicans embraced the Jeffersonian antislavery legacy during the Missouri debates and explicitly cited the Declaration of Independence as an argument against expanding the institution. Southern leaders, seeking to defend slavery, renounced the document's universal egalitarian applications and its declaration that "all men are created equal."

== Issues ==
=== Three-fifths clause ===
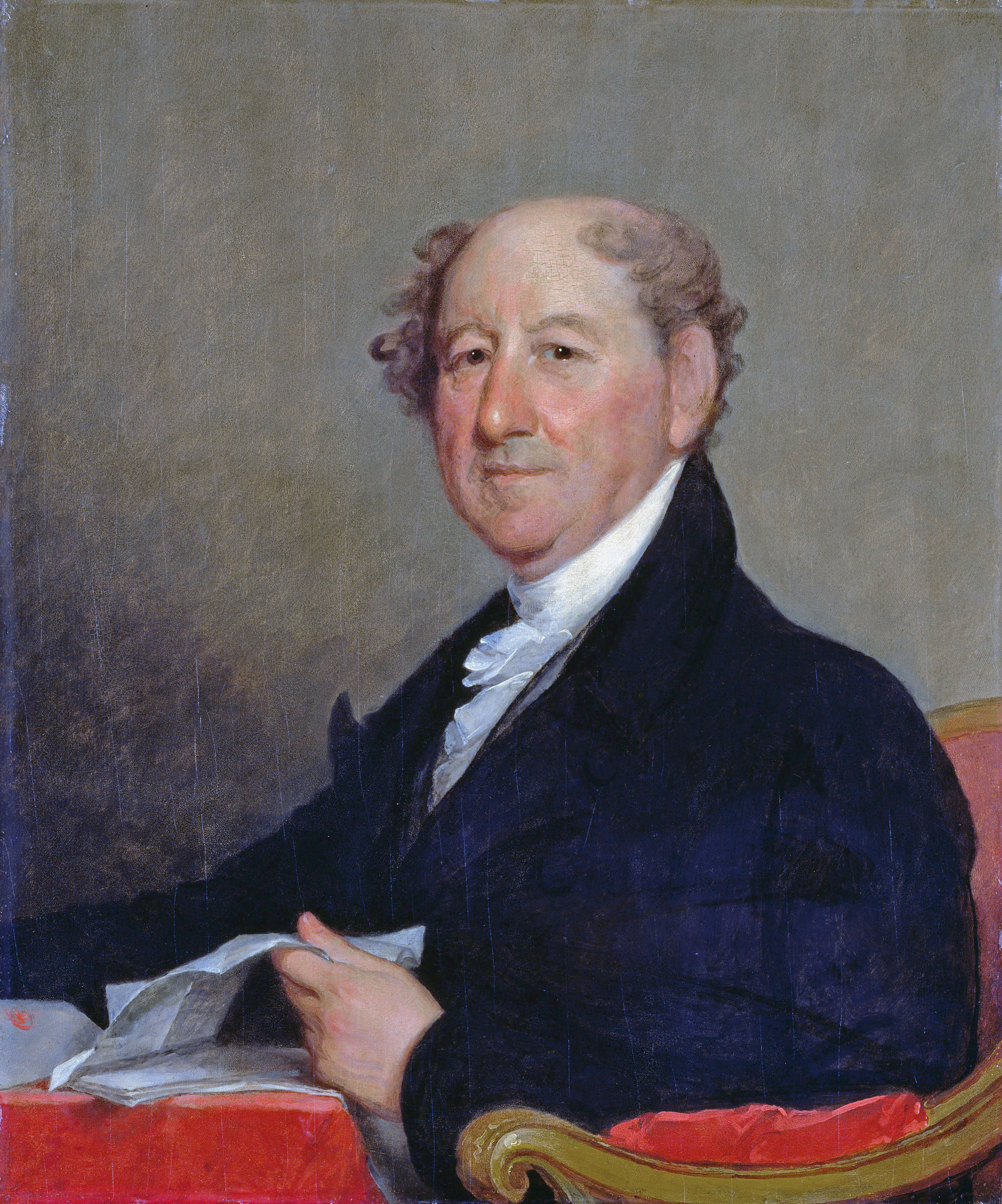
Rufus King, the last of the Federalist icons

Article 1, Section 2, of the US Constitution supplemented legislative representation in states whose residents owned slaves. Known as the Three-Fifths Clause, or the "federal ratio", three-fifths of the slave population was numerically added to the free population. That sum was used for each state to calculate congressional districts and the number of delegates to the Electoral College. The federal ratio produced a significant number of legislative victories for the South in the years before the Missouri Crisis and raised the South's influence in party caucuses, the appointment of judges, and the distribution of patronage. It is unlikely that the ratio before 1820 was decisive in affecting legislation on slavery. Indeed, with the rising northern representation in the House, the southern share of the membership had declined since the 1790s.

Hostility to the federal ratio had historically been the object of the Federalists, which were now nationally ineffectual, who attributed their collective decline on the "Virginia Dynasty". They expressed their dissatisfaction in partisan terms, rather than in moral condemnation of slavery, and the pro-De Witt Clinton-Federalist faction carried on the tradition by posing as anti-restrictionists to advance their fortunes in New York politics.

Senator Rufus King of New York, a Clinton associate, was the last Federalist icon still active on the national stage, a fact that was irksome to southern Democratic-Republicans. A signatory to the US Constitution, he had strongly opposed the federal ratio in 1787. In the 15th Congress debates in 1819, he revived his critique as a complaint that New England and the Mid-Atlantic States suffered unduly from the federal ratio and declared himself 'degraded' (politically inferior) to the slaveholders. Federalists both in the North and the South preferred to mute antislavery rhetoric, but during the 1820 debates in the 16th Congress, King and other Federalists would expand their old critique to include moral considerations of slavery.

Democratic-Republican James Tallmadge Jr. and the Missouri restrictionists deplored the federal ratio because it had translated into political supremacy for the South. They had no agenda to remove it from the Constitution but only to prevent its further application west of the Mississippi River.

As determined as southern Democratic-Republicans were to secure Missouri statehood with slavery, the federal clause ratio failed to provide the margin of victory in the 15th Congress. Blocked by northern Democratic-Republicans, largely on egalitarian grounds, with sectional support from Federalists, the statehood bill died in the Senate, where the federal ratio had no relevance. The balance of power between the sections and the maintenance of Southern pre-eminence on matters related to slavery resided in the Senate.

=== Balance of power in Senate ===
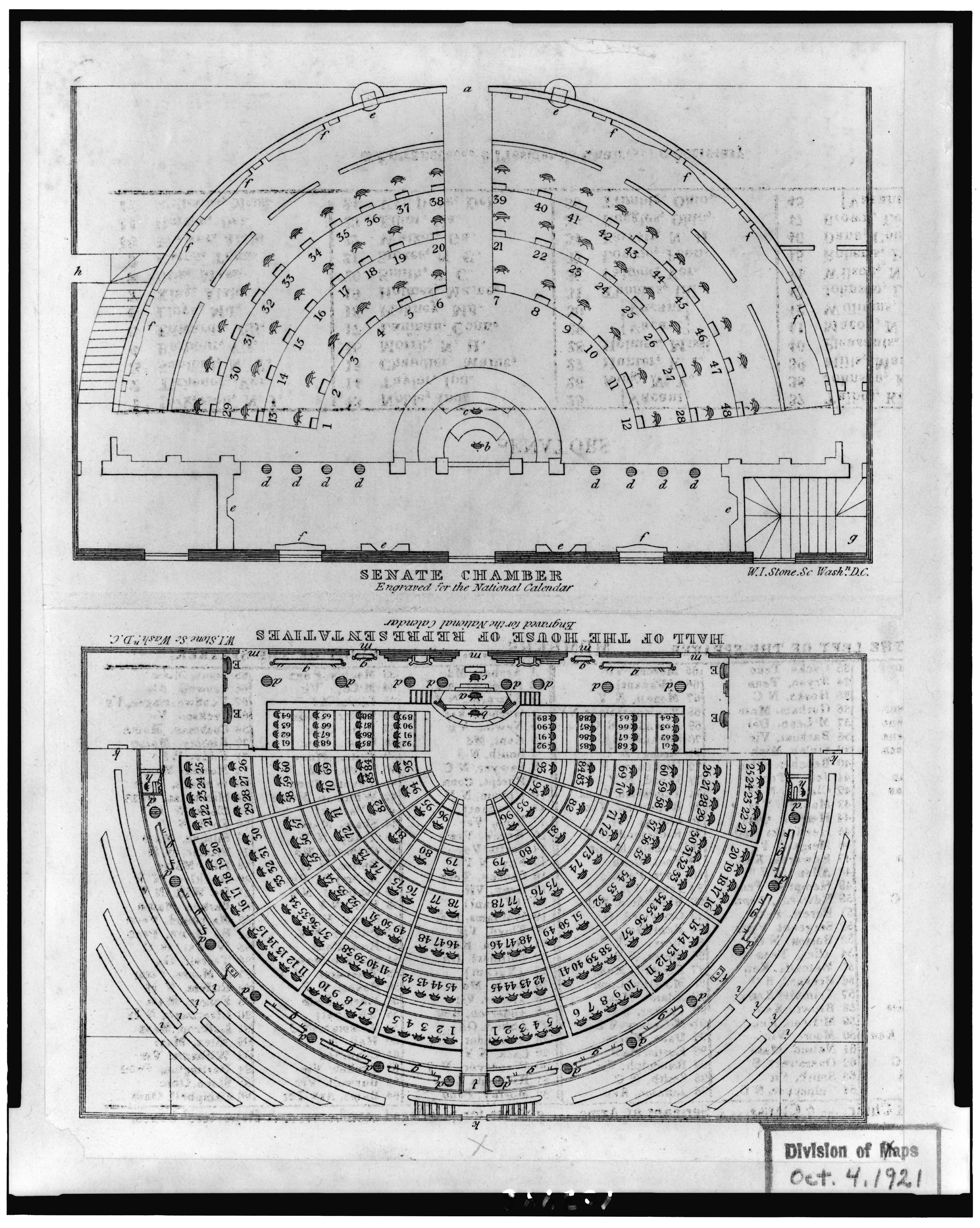
Diagram of the Old Senate Chamber

Northern majorities in the House did not translate into political dominance. The fulcrum for proslavery forces resided in the Senate, where constitutional compromise in 1787 had provided for two senators per state, regardless of its population. The South, with its smaller free population than the North, benefited from that arrangement. Since 1815, sectional parity in the Senate had been achieved through paired admissions, which left the North and the South, during the application of Missouri Territory, at 11 states each.

The South, voting as a bloc on measures that challenged slaveholding interests and augmented by defections from free states with varying degrees of southern sympathies, was able to tally majorities. The Senate stood as the bulwark and source of the Slave Power, which required admission of slave states to the Union to preserve its national primacy.

Missouri statehood, with the Tallmadge Amendment approved, would have set a trajectory towards a free state west of the Mississippi and a decline in southern political authority. The question as to whether the Congress was allowed to restrain the growth of slavery in Missouri took on great importance in slave states. The moral dimensions of the expansion of human bondage would be raised by northern Democratic-Republicans on constitutional grounds.

=== Constitutional arguments ===
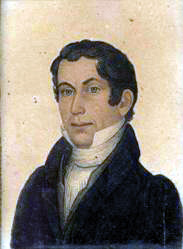
Massachusetts representative Timothy Fuller

The Tallmadge Amendment was "the first serious challenge to the extension of slavery" and raised questions concerning the interpretation of the republic's founding documents.

Democratic-Republicans justified Tallmadge's restrictions on the grounds that Congress possessed the authority to impose territorial statutes that would remain in force after statehood was established. Representative John W. Taylor pointed to Indiana and Illinois, where their free state status conformed to antislavery provisions of the Northwest Ordinance.

Further, antislavery legislators invoked Article IV, Section 4 of the Constitution, which requires states to provide a republican form of government. As the Louisiana Territory was not part of the United States in 1787, they argued that introducing slavery into Missouri would thwart the egalitarian intent of the Founders.

Proslavery Democratic-Republicans countered that the Constitution had long been interpreted as having relinquished any claim to restricting slavery in the states. The free inhabitants of Missouri in the territorial phase or during statehood had the right to establish or disestablish slavery without interference from the federal government. As to the Northwest Ordinance, southerners denied that it could serve as a lawful antecedent for the territories of the Louisiana Purchase, as the ordinance had been issued under the Articles of Confederation, rather than the US Constitution.

As a legal precedent, they offered the treaty acquiring the Louisiana lands in 1803, a document that included a provision, Article 3, which extended the rights of US citizens to all inhabitants of the new territory, including the protection of property in slaves. When slaveholders embraced Jeffersonian constitutional strictures on a limited central government, they were reminded that Jefferson, as president in 1803, had deviated from those precepts by wielding federal executive power to double the size of the United States, including the lands under consideration for Missouri statehood. In doing so, he set a constitutional precedent that would serve to rationalize Tallmadge's federally imposed slavery restrictions.

The 15th Congress had debates that focused on constitutional questions but largely avoided the moral dimensions raised by the topic of slavery. That the unmentionable subject had been raised publicly was deeply offensive to southern representatives and violated the longtime sectional understanding between legislators from free states and slave states.

Missouri statehood confronted southern Democratic-Republicans with the prospect of applying the egalitarian principles espoused by the Revolutionary generation. That would require halting the spread of slavery westward and confine the institution to where it already existed. Faced with a population of 1.5 million slaves and the lucrative production of cotton, the South would abandon hopes for containment. Slaveholders in the 16th Congress, in an effort to come to grips with that paradox, resorted to a theory that called for extending slavery geographically so as to encourage its decline, which they called "diffusion".

== Debate ==
=== Tallmadge amendment ===
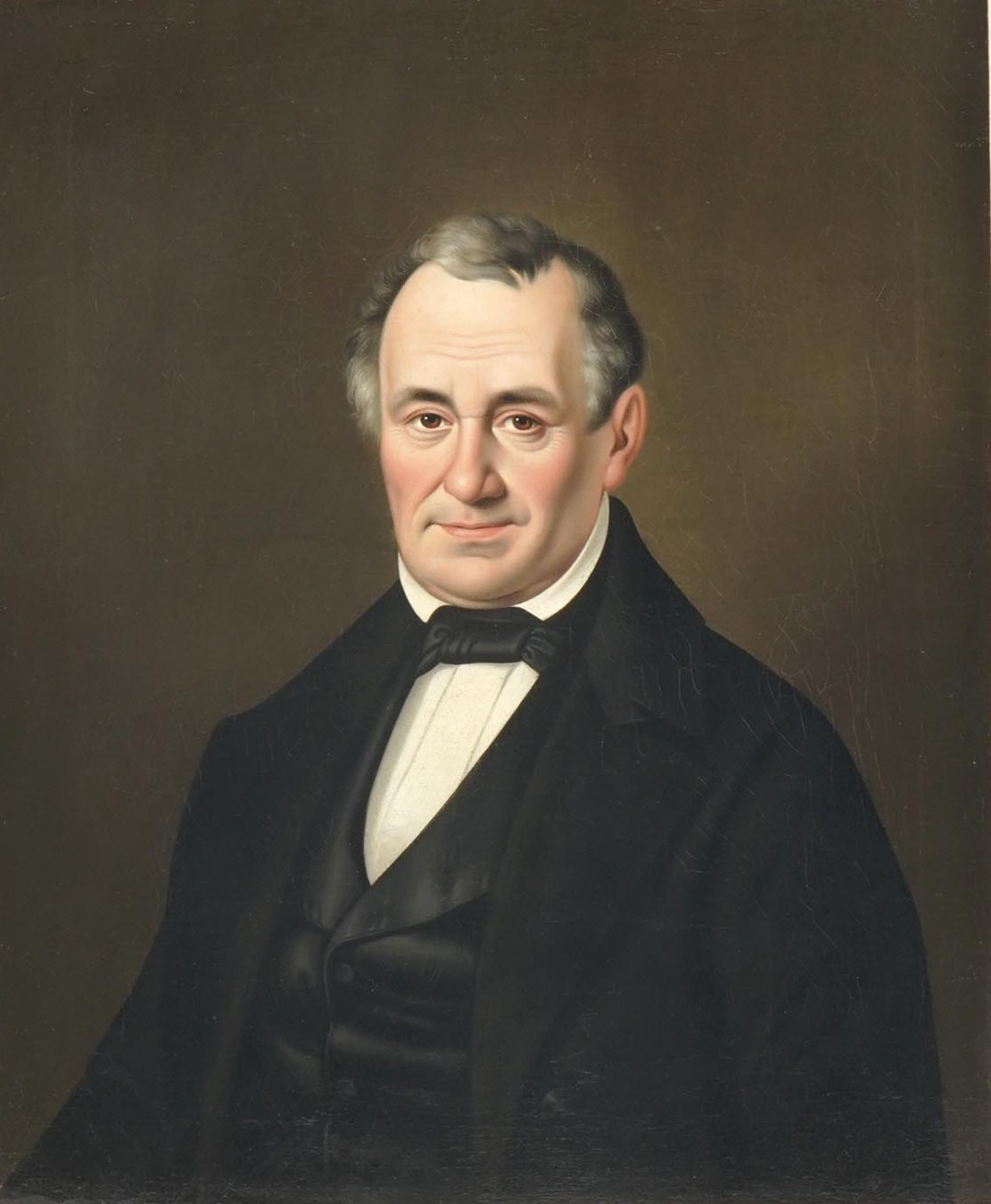
Representative James Tallmadge Jr., the author of the antislavery amendment to Missouri statehood

When the Missouri statehood bill was opened for debate in the House of Representatives on February 13, 1819, early exchanges on the floor proceeded without serious incident. In the course of the proceedings, however, Representative James Tallmadge Jr. of New York "tossed a bombshell into the Era of Good Feelings" with the following amendments:

Provided, that the further introduction of slavery or involuntary servitude be prohibited, except for the punishment of crimes, whereof the party shall have been fully convicted; and that all children born within the said State after the admission thereof into the Union, shall be free at the age of twenty-five years.

A political outsider, the 41-year-old Tallmadge conceived his amendment based on a strong personal aversion to slavery. He had played a leading role in accelerating the emancipation of the remaining slaves in New York in 1817 and had campaigned against Illinois's Black Codes. Though ostensibly free-soil, the new state had a constitution that permitted indentured servitude and a limited form of slavery. As a New York Democratic-Republican, Tallmadge maintained an uneasy association with New York Governor DeWitt Clinton, a Democratic-Republican who depended on support from ex-Federalists. Clinton's faction was hostile to Tallmadge for his spirited defense of General Andrew Jackson's contentious invasion of Florida.

After proposing the amendment, Tallmadge fell ill, and Representative John W. Taylor, a fellow New York Democratic-Republican, stepped in to fill the void. Taylor also had antislavery credentials since in February 1819, he had proposed a similar slave restriction for Arkansas Territory in the House, which was defeated 89–87. In a speech before the House during the debate on the Tallmadge Amendment, Taylor was highly critical of southern lawmakers, who frequently voiced their dismay that slavery was entrenched and necessary to their existence, and he warned that Missouri's fate would "decide the destiny of millions" in future states in the American West.

The controversy on the amendment and the future of slavery in the nation created much dissension among Democratic-Republicans and polarized the party. Northern Democratic-Republicans formed a coalition across factional lines with remnants of the Federalists. Southern Democratic-Republicans united in almost unanimous opposition. The ensuing debates pitted the northern "restrictionists", antislavery legislators who wished to bar slavery from the Louisiana Territory and all future states and territories, and southern "anti-restrictionists", proslavery legislators who rejected any interference by Congress that inhibited slavery expansion. The sectional "rupture" over slavery among Democratic-Republicans, first exposed in the Missouri Crisis, had its roots in the Revolutionary generation.

Five Representatives in Maine were opposed to spreading slavery into new territories. Dr. Brian Purnell, a professor of Africana Studies and US history at Bowdoin College, writes in Portland Magazine, "Martin Kinsley, Joshua Cushman, Ezekiel Whitman, Enoch Lincoln, and James Parker—wanted to prohibit slavery's spread into new territories. In 1820, they voted against the Missouri Compromise and against Maine's independence. In their defense, they wrote that, if the North, and the nation, embarked upon this Compromise—and ignored what experiences proved, namely that southern slaveholders were determined to dominate the nation through ironclad unity and perpetual pressure to demand more land, and more slaves—then these five Mainers declared Americans "shall deserve to be considered a besotted and stupid race, fit, only, to be led blindfold; and worthy, only, to be treated with sovereign contempt".

=== Stalemate ===
On February 16, 1819, the House Committee of the Whole voted to link Tallmadge's provisions with the Missouri statehood legislation by 79–67. After the committee vote, debates resumed over the merits of each of Tallmadge's provisions in the enabling act. The debates in the House's 2nd session in 1819 lasted only three days. They have been characterized as "rancorous", "fiery", "bitter", "blistering", "furious" and "bloodthirsty".

You have kindled a fire which all the waters of the ocean cannot put out, which seas of blood can only extinguish.

— Representative Thomas W. Cobb of Georgia

If a dissolution of the Union must take place, let it be so! If civil war, which gentlemen so much threaten, must come, I can only say, let it come!

— Representative James Tallmadge Jr. of New York:

Representatives from the North outnumbered those from the South in House membership 105 to 81. When each of the restrictionist provisions was put to the vote, they passed along sectional lines: 87 to 76 for prohibition on further slave migration into Missouri and 82 to 78 for emancipating the offspring of slaves at 25.

House vote on restricting slavery in Missouri
Faction	Yea	Nay	Abs.	Total
Northern Federalists	22	3	3	28
Northern Democratic-Republicans	64	7	6	77
North total	86	10	9	105
South total	1	66	13	80
House total	87	76	22	185

The enabling bill was passed to the Senate, and both parts of it were rejected: 22–16 against the restriction of new slaves in Missouri (supported by five northerners, two of whom were the proslavery legislators from the free state of Illinois) and 31–7 against the gradual emancipation for slave children born after statehood. House antislavery restrictionists refused to concur with the Senate proslavery anti-restrictionists, and Missouri statehood would devolve upon the 16th Congress in December 1819.

=== Development and passage ===
Because it no longer wanted to be part of non-contiguous Massachusetts after the War of 1812, the northern region of Massachusetts, the District of Maine, sought and ultimately gained admission into the United States as a free state to become the separate state of Maine. That occurred only as a result of a compromise involving slavery in Missouri and in the federal territories of the American West.

The admission of another slave state would increase southern power when northern politicians had already begun to regret the Constitution's Three-Fifths Compromise. Although more than 60 percent of white Americans lived in the North, northern representatives held only a slim majority of congressional seats by 1818. The additional political representation allotted to the South as a result of the Three-Fifths Compromise gave southerners more seats in the House of Representatives than they would have had if the number was based on the free population alone. Moreover, since each state had two Senate seats, Missouri's admission as a slave state would result in more southern than northern senators. A bill to enable the people of the Missouri Territory to draft a constitution and form a government preliminary to admission into the Union came before the House of Representatives in Committee of the Whole, on February 13, 1819. James Tallmadge of New York offered the Tallmadge Amendment, which forbade further introduction of slaves into Missouri and mandated that all children of slave parents born in the state after its admission to be free at the age of 25. The committee adopted the measure and incorporated it into the bill as finally passed on February 17, 1819, by the House. The Senate refused to concur with the amendment, and the whole measure was lost.

During the following session (1819–1820), the House passed a similar bill with an amendment, introduced on January 26, 1820, by John W. Taylor of New York, allowing Missouri into the union as a slave state. The question had been complicated by the admission in December of Alabama, a slave state, which made the number of slave and free states equal. In addition, there was a bill in passage through the House (January 3, 1820) to admit Maine as a free state.

The Senate decided to connect the two measures. It passed a bill for the admission of Maine with an amendment enabling the people of Missouri to form a state constitution. Before the bill was returned to the House, a second amendment was adopted, on the motion of Jesse B. Thomas of Illinois, to exclude slavery from the Louisiana Territory north of the latitude 36°30' north, the southern boundary of Missouri, except within the limits of the proposed state of Missouri.

The vote in the Senate was 24-20 for the compromise. The amendment and the bill passed in the Senate on February 17 and February 18, 1820. The House then approved the Senate compromise amendment, 90–87, with all of the opposition coming from representatives from the free states. The House then approved the whole bill 134–42 with opposition from the southern states.

== Aftermath ==
=== Partisan responses ===
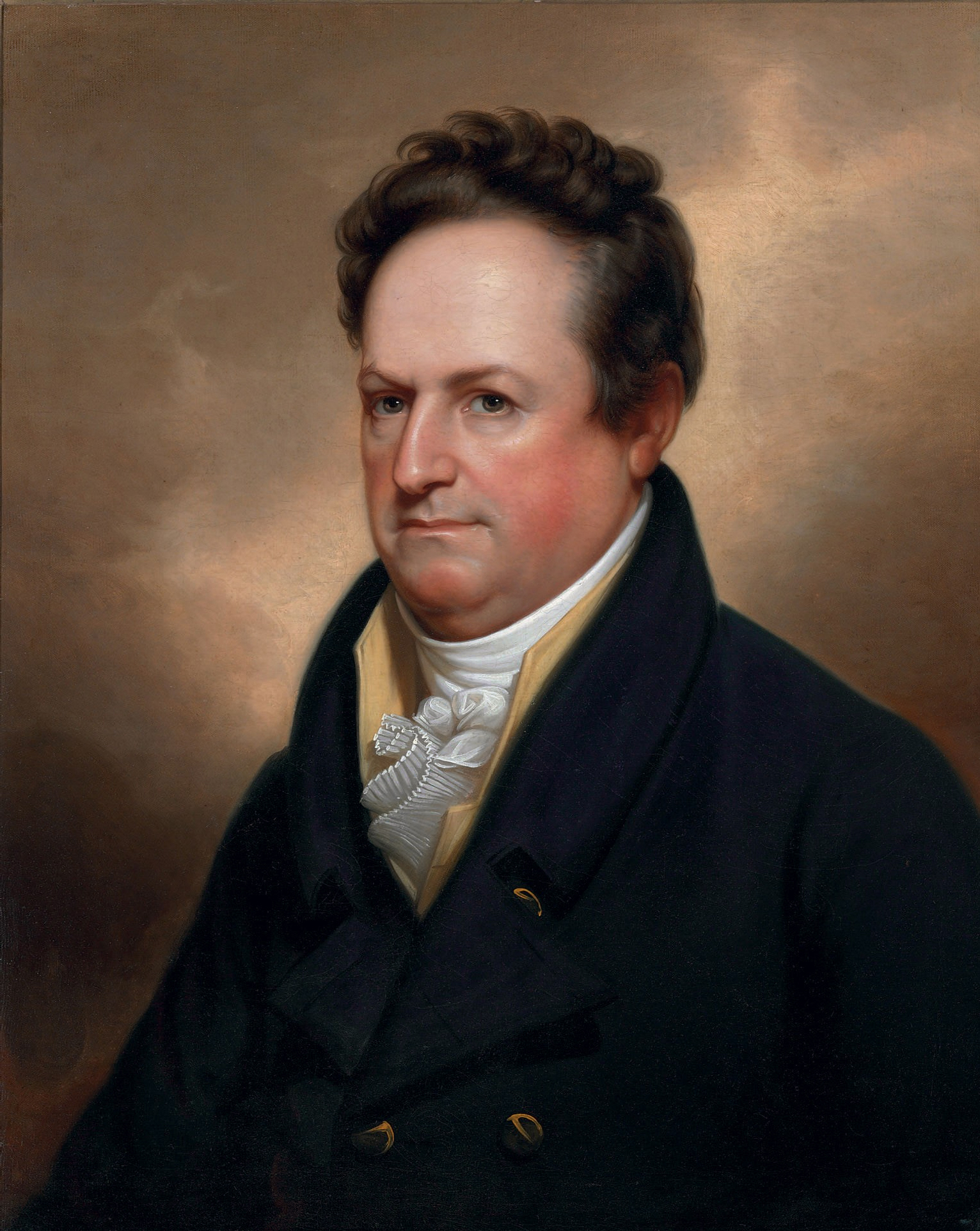
New York Governor DeWitt Clinton

The Missouri Compromise debates stirred suspicions by slavery interests that the underlying purpose of the Tallmadge Amendments had little to do with opposition to the expansion of slavery. The accusation was first leveled in the House by the Democratic-Republican anti-restrictionist John Holmes from the District of Maine. He suggested that Senator Rufus King's "warm" support for the Tallmadge Amendment concealed a conspiracy to organize a new antislavery party in the North, which would be composed of old Federalists in combination with disaffected antislavery Democratic-Republicans. The fact that King in the Senate and Tallmadge and Tyler in the House, all New Yorkers, were among the vanguard for restriction on slavery in Missouri lent credibility to those charges. When King was re-elected to the US Senate in January 1820, during the 16th Congress debates and with bipartisan support, suspicions deepened and persisted throughout the crisis. Southern Democratic-Republican leadership, including President Monroe and ex-President Thomas Jefferson, considered it as an article of faith that Federalists, given the chance, would destabilize the Union as to restore monarchical rule in North America and "consolidate" political control over the people by expanding the functions of the federal government. Jefferson, at first unperturbed by the Missouri question, soon became convinced that a northern conspiracy was afoot, with Federalists and crypto-Federalists posing as Democratic-Republicans and using Missouri statehood as a pretext.

The disarray of the Democratic-Republican ascendancy brought about by amalgamation made fears abound in Southerners that a Free State Party might take shape if Congress failed to reach an understanding over Missouri and slavery and possibly threaten southern pre-eminence. Secretary of State John Quincy Adams of Massachusetts surmised that the political configuration for just such a sectional party already existed. That the Federalists were anxious to regain a measure of political participation in national politics was indisputable. There was no basis, however, for the charge that Federalists had directed Tallmadge in his antislavery measures, and there was nothing to indicate that a New York-based King-Clinton alliance sought to erect an antislavery party on the ruins of the Democratic-Republican Party. The allegations by Southern interests for slavery of a "plot" or that of "consolidation" as a threat to the Union misapprehended the forces at work in the Missouri crisis. The core of the opposition to slavery in the Louisiana Purchase was informed by Jeffersonian egalitarian principles, not a Federalist resurgence.

=== Second Missouri Compromise ===
The two houses were at odds on the issue of the legality of slavery but also on the parliamentary question of the inclusion of Maine and Missouri in the same bill. The committee recommended the enactment of two laws, one for the admission of Maine and the other an enabling act for Missouri. It also recommended having no restrictions on slavery but keeping the Thomas Amendment. Both houses agreed, and the measures were passed on March 5, 1820, and signed by President James Monroe on March 6.

The question of the final admission of Missouri came up during the session of 1820–1821. The struggle was revived over a clause in Missouri's new constitution, written in 1820, which required the exclusion of "free negroes and mulattoes" from the state. Under the influence of Kentucky Representative Henry Clay, who became known as "The Great Compromiser", an act of admission was finally passed that the exclusionary clause of the Missouri constitution should "never be construed to authorize the passage of any law" impairing the privileges and immunities of any U.S. citizen. That deliberately ambiguous provision is sometimes known as the Second Missouri Compromise.

== Legacy ==
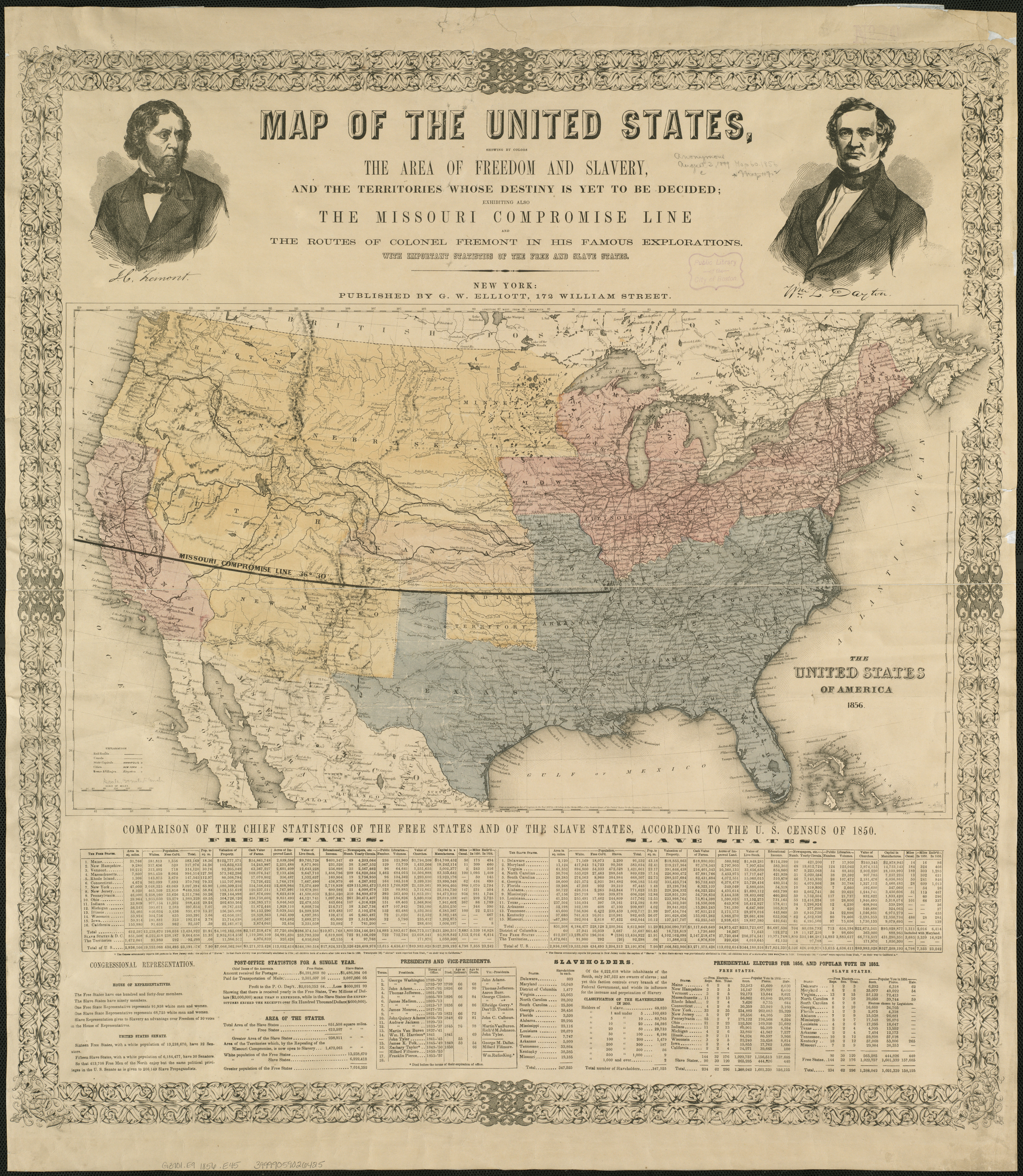
Campaign advertisement promoting the candidacy of Republican John C. Fremont in the 1856 United States presidential election, emphasizing the Missouri Compromise line.

For decades afterward, most Americans hailed the 1820 agreement as an essential compromise, almost on the sacred level of the Constitution itself. Although the Civil War eventually broke out in 1861, historians often say that the Compromise helped postpone the war.

The disputes involved the competition between the southern and northern states for power in Congress and control over future territories. There were also the same factions emerging, as the Democratic-Republican Party began to lose its coherence. In an April 22 letter to John Holmes, former President Thomas Jefferson wrote that while the compromise defused tensions in the short term, the regional division of the country created by the Compromise Line would eventually lead to the destruction of the Union:

... but this momentous question, like a fire bell in the night, awakened and filled me with terror. I considered it at once as the knell of the Union. It is hushed indeed for the moment. but this is a reprieve only, not a final sentence. A geographical line, coinciding with a marked principle, moral and political, once conceived and held up to the angry passions of men, will never be obliterated; and every new irritation will mark it deeper and deeper.

Extension of slavery westward was discussed by Congress during the Texas Annexation in 1845, during the Compromise of 1850, and as part of the proposed Crittenden Compromise in 1860, but the line never reached the Pacific.

The debate over the admission of Missouri also raised the issue of sectional balance, as the country was equally divided between slave states and free states, with eleven each. To admit Missouri as a slave state would tip the balance in the Senate, which is made up of two senators per state, in favor of the slave states. That made northern states want Maine admitted as a free state. Maine was admitted in 1820, and Missouri in 1821, The trend of admitting a new free or slave state to balance the status of previous ones would continue up until the Compromise of 1850. The next state to be admitted would be Arkansas (slave state) in 1836, quickly followed by Michigan (free state) in 1837. In 1845, two slave states (Texas and Florida) were admitted, which was countered by the free states of Iowa and Wisconsin in 1846 and 1848. Four more free and no more slave states would be admitted before the outbreak of the Civil War.

From the constitutional standpoint, the Missouri Compromise was important as an example of the congressional exclusion of slavery from US territory acquired since the Northwest Ordinance of 1787. Nevertheless, the Compromise was deeply disappointing to blacks in the South, as it stopped the Southern progression of gradual emancipation at Missouri's southern border, and it legitimized slavery as a Southern institution.

=== Repeal and end ===
The provisions of the Missouri Compromise forbidding slavery in the former Louisiana Territory north of the parallel 36°30′ north were effectively repealed by Stephen A. Douglas's Kansas–Nebraska Act of 1854. The repeal of the Compromise caused outrage in the North and sparked the return to politics of Abraham Lincoln, who criticized slavery and excoriated Douglas's act in his "Peoria Speech" (October 16, 1854).

Later, in the Dred Scott v. Sandford case in 1857, the Supreme Court ruled that Congress did not have authority to prohibit slavery in territories, and that those provisions of the Missouri Compromise were unconstitutional.

== See also ==
- Compromise of 1790
- Compromise of 1850
- Kansas–Nebraska Act
- Origins of the American Civil War
- Royal Colonial Boundary of 1665
- Tallmadge Amendment
- Slave Trade Acts
- Dred Scott v. Sandford
- Northwest Ordinance

== Bibliography ==
- Brown, Richard H. (1970) [Winter 1966], "Missouri Crisis, Slavery, and the Politics of Jacksonianism", in Gatell, Frank Otto (ed.), Essays on Jacksonian America, New York: Holt, Rinehart and Winston, pp. 5–72
- Burns, James MacGregor (1982), The Vineyard of Liberty, Alfred A. Knopf, ISBN 0394505468
- Dangerfield, George (1965), The Awakening of American Nationalism: 1815–1828, New York: Harper & Row, ISBN 978-0881338232
- Ellis, Joseph A. (1996), American sphinx: the character of Thomas Jefferson, New York: Alfred A. Knopf, ISBN 978-0679764410
- Hammond, John Craig (2021), "The Centrality of Slavery: Enslavement and Settler Sovereignty in Missouri, 1770–1820", in Pasley, Jeffrey; Hammond, John Craig (eds.), A Fire Bell in the Past: The Missouri Crisis at 200, Volume I, Western Slavery, National Impasse, University of Missouri Press
- Hammond, John Craig (March 2019), "President, Planter, Politician: James Monroe, the Missouri Crisis, and the Politics of Slavery", Journal of American History, 105 (3): 843–867, doi:10.1093/jahist/jaz002
- Hammond, John Craig (2007), Slavery, Freedom, and Expansion in the Early American West, Charlottesville: University of Virginia Press
- Howe, Daniel W. (2007), What hath God wrought: the transformation of America, 1815–1848, New York: Oxford University Press, ISBN 978-0195392432
- Malone, Dumas; Rauch, Basil (1960), Empire for Liberty: The Genesis and Growth of the United States of America, New York: Appleton-Century Crofts
- Miller, William L. (1995), Arguing about Slavery: The Great Battle in the United States Congress, Borzoi Books, Alfred J. Knopf, ISBN 0-394-56922-9
- Staloff, Darren (2005), Hamilton, Adams, Jefferson: The Politics of Enlightenment and the American Founding, New York: Hill and Wang, ISBN 0-8090-7784-1
- Varon, Elizabeth R. (2008), Disunion! The Coming of the American Civil War, 1789–1859, Chapel Hill, North Carolina: University of North Carolina Press, ISBN 978-0-8078-3232-5
- Wilentz, Sean (Fall 2004), "Jeffersonian Democracy and the Origins of Political Antislavery in the United States: The Missouri Crisis Revisited", The Journal of the Historical Society, IV (3)
- Wilentz, Sean (2016), The Politicians & the Egalitarians: The Hidden History of American Politics, New York: W.W. Norton & Company, ISBN 978-0-393-28502-4
