= Attorney General Lynch =

Attorney General Lynch may refer to:

- B. L. Lynch (1830–?), Attorney General of Louisiana
- Loretta Lynch (born 1959), Attorney General of the United States
- Patrick Lynch (Irish attorney general) (1866–1947), Attorney General of Ireland
- Patrick Lynch (Rhode Island attorney general) (born 1965), Attorney General of Rhode Island
- Thomas C. Lynch (1904–1986), Attorney General of California

== See also ==
- General Lynch (disambiguation)
