= Samuel Marx (disambiguation) =

Samuel Marx (1902–1992) was an American film producer and writer.

Samuel Marx may also refer to:

- Sam Marx born as Simon Marx (1859–1933), father of the Marx brothers
- Samuel Marx (New York politician) (1867–1922), American politician
- Samuel Abraham Marx (1885–1964), American architect, designer and interior decorator
