= General Lynch =

General Lynch may refer to:

- Jarvis Lynch (born 1933), U.S. Marine Corps major general
- Liam Lynch (Irish republican) (1892–1923), Irish Republican Army general

== See also ==
- Attorney General Lynch (disambiguation)
