= Joseph Rowan =

American politician (1870–1930)

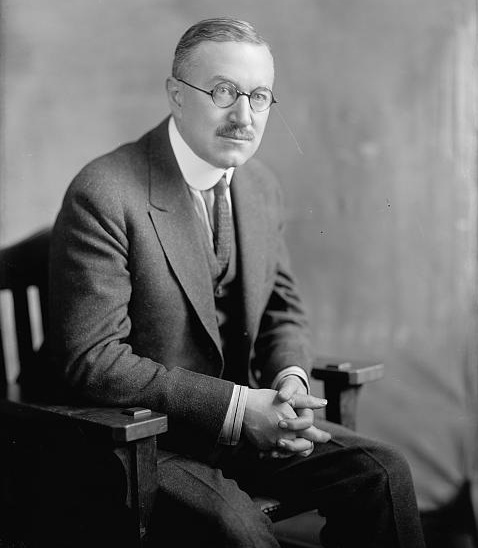
- Rowan in 1919

Member of the U.S. House of Representatives from New York's 19th district
- In office March 4, 1919 – March 4, 1921
- Preceded by: Walter M. Chandler
- Succeeded by: Walter M. Chandler

Personal details
- Born: September 8, 1870 New York, New York
- Died: August 3, 1930 (aged 59) New York, New York
- Party: Democratic Party
- Spouse: Cora Cook
- Occupation: Attorney

Joseph Rowan (September 8, 1870 – August 3, 1930) was an American lawyer, banker, and politician who served one term as a U.S. representative from New York from 1919 to 1921.

== Biography ==
Joseph Charles Rowan was born in New York City on September 8, 1870. He attended the public schools and graduated from Columbia Law School in 1891. He was admitted to the bar in 1892 and practiced in New York City.

He was also involved in banking and other businesses, including serving as a trustee of the West Side Savings Bank. In 1905, Rowan married Cora Cook, the daughter of Dr. Stephen Cook, the chief surgeon of the New York City Police Department.

=== Congress ===
A Democrat allied with Tammany Hall, in 1918, Rowan ran successfully for a seat in the U.S. House, defeating incumbent Walter M. Chandler. He served in the 66th United States Congress, March 4, 1919 – March 4, 1921. He was not a candidate for renomination in 1920, and resumed the practice of law.

=== Death and burial ===
He died in New York City on August 3, 1930. Rowan was interred in Woodlawn Cemetery.

U.S. House of Representatives
Preceded by Walter M. Chandler	Member of the U.S. House of Representatives from New York's 19th congressional district 1919–1921	Succeeded by Walter M. Chandler
