= Sol Bloom =

American politician (1870–1949)

Member of the U.S. House of Representatives from New York
- In office March 4, 1923 – March 7, 1949
- Preceded by: Walter M. Chandler
- Succeeded by: Franklin D. Roosevelt Jr.
- Constituency: 19th district (1923–45); 20th district (1945–49)

Chairman of the United States House Committee on Foreign Affairs
- In office January 3, 1949 – March 7, 1949
- Preceded by: Charles A. Eaton
- Succeeded by: John Kee
- In office January 3, 1939 – January 3, 1947
- Preceded by: Samuel Davis McReynolds
- Succeeded by: Charles A. Eaton

Personal details
- Born: March 9, 1870 Pekin, Illinois, U.S.
- Died: March 7, 1949 (aged 78) Washington, D.C., U.S.
- Party: Democratic
- Spouse: Evelyn Hechheimer (m. 1897; died 1941)
- Children: 1

Sol Bloom (March 9, 1870 – March 7, 1949) was an American songwriter and politician from New York City who began his career as an entertainment impresario and sheet music publisher in Chicago. He served 14 terms in the United States House of Representatives from the West Side of Manhattan, serving from 1923 until his death in 1949.

== Early life ==
Bloom was born March 9, 1870, in Pekin, Illinois, to Polish-Jewish immigrants who soon moved to San Francisco. He was introduced to theater production in his early teens, then became a theater manager, staging boxing matches featuring "Gentleman Jim" Corbett. Seeking ever more spectacular attractions, he attended the Exposition Universelle (1889) in Paris, where he was particularly taken with the dancers and acrobats of the "Algerian Village," somewhat representative of France's Algerian colony.

Bloom could converse sparingly in four or five European languages, and was adept in sign language.

== Chicago World's Fair ==
Bloom established his reputation in 1893 at the age of 23 while developing the mile-long Midway Plaisance at the World's Columbian Exposition in Chicago. The Midway Plaisance offered enticing games and exhibitions presented by private vendors, removed from the more conservative Beaux-Arts splendor of the official exposition and arranged around its "Court of Honor". After initially entrusting the midway to a Harvard anthropology professor, the committee turned to Bloom, whose "Midway" was so successful that the term resided henceforth in the American lexicon. At the "Street in Cairo", the North African belly dance was reinvented as the "hootchy-kootchy dance" to a tune made up by Bloom, "The Streets of Cairo, or the Poor Little Country Maid", whose century-old lyrics had traditionally been sung by young boys: "O they don't wear pants/on the sunny side of France"; "There's a place in France/where the women wear no pants"; "...where the naked ladies dance", etc. Bloom did not copyright the tune, which he'd conceived on a piano at the Press Club of Chicago. In her book Striptease, The Untold Story of the Girlie Shows, Rachel Shteir stated that Bloom made money equal to that of U.S. President Grover Cleveland from his exotic dance shows. Bloom also published and promoted “Coon, Coon, Coon”, one of the most famous entries in the coon song genre.

Bloom's role in helping to develop the fair had been at the behest of Mayor Carter Harrison III, who was assassinated only days before the exposition closed. Bloom then rose in stature in Chicago's tough first ward among the Democratic party's bosses "Bathhouse" John Coughlin and "Hinky Dink" Kenna. Soon, he became Chicago branch manager of M. Witmark & Sons, the largest publisher of sheet music in the United States, and by 1896 he was publishing under his own name and introducing photolithographs to make the scores more visually appealing. In 1897 he married Evelyn Hechheimer and settled in a fashionable district on South Prairie Avenue, billing himself as "Sol Bloom, the Music Man". At the turn of the 20th century, he was awarded, to much fanfare, the first musical copyright of the new century for "I Wish I Was in Dixie Land Tonight" by Raymond A. Browne.

== Move to New York and politics ==
In 1903 he moved to New York City, where he dabbled in real estate and expanded his national chain of department store music departments. In New York, he sold Victor Talking Machines. Bloom soon switched his political affiliation from Republican to the Democrats' Tammany Hall, so that when Representative-elect Samuel Marx of New York's 19th Congressional District died in 1922, Bloom was invited to run and won the usually Republican Upper West Side district of Manhattan by 145 votes. He represented the district until his death in 1949.

A confidential 1943 analysis of the House Foreign Affairs Committee by Isaiah Berlin for the British Foreign Office stated that

(The committee's) main weakness is probably the leadership of Sol Bloom, whose chairmanship of the committee is due solely to the processes of seniority, and certainly not to any outstanding ability or knowledge of foreign affairs, but this is made up for by his blind loyalty to the President's policies ... Has been in Congress since 1923. Is politically friendly toward the British and has been a consistent supporter of F.D.R.'s foreign policies. A Jew, who was elected mostly by Jewish and foreign elements in his New York district, he tends, therefore, to be Europe-conscious and strongly anti-Nazi. He is of the easy-going, superficial, glad-handish type rather than a man of outstanding intellect; intensely patriotic in an emotional way despite his leaning towards internationalism. He helped to pilot the original Lend-Lease Act through the committee, and introduced the Act to extend Lend-Lease for one year. Age 73.

In Congress Bloom oversaw celebration of the George Washington Bicentennial (1932) and presided over the U.S. Constitution Sesquicentennial Exposition (1937). He chaired the House Committee on Foreign Affairs beginning in 1939. A strong supporter of Zionism, Bloom was a delegate to the convention in San Francisco that established the United Nations. The first words of the Preamble to the United Nations Charter, "We, the Peoples of the United Nations .. ." were suggested by Bloom.

In January 1946, Bloom represented the US at the first meeting of the UN General Assembly in London. He called his success in persuading a majority of the Assembly to allow the new United Nations organization to assume the finances of the earlier United Nations Relief and Rehabilitation Administration "the supreme moment" of his life.

== In the House of Representatives ==
Bloom was the chairman of the House Foreign Affairs Committee from 1939 to 1947 and then again in 1949, during critical periods of American foreign policy. In the run-up to World War II, he took charge of high-priority legislation for the Roosevelt Administration, including authorization for Lend Lease in 1940. He oversaw Congressional approval of the United Nations and of the United Nations Relief and Rehabilitation Administration (UNRRA), which worked to assist millions of displaced people in Europe. He was a member of the American delegation at the creation of the United Nations in San Francisco in 1945 and at the Rio Conference in 1947.

In coordination with America's mainstream Jewish leadership, especially World Jewish Congress executives Stephen Wise and Nachum Goldman, Bloom strongly opposed and obstructed the Hillel Kook-led Emergency Committee for the Rescue of European Jewry, (also known as the Bergson Group).

In the fall of 1943, Bloom initiated a Congressional hearing to investigate Kook and his group's rescue-oriented actions and their demand that America do something meaningful to protect the Jews of Europe. Right before Yom Kippur that year, Bloom tried to dissuade a group of about 400 Orthodox rabbis from marching to Washington and appealing to President Franklin D Roosevelt for some meaningful way to save remnants of Jews abandoned in Europe. Along with some progressive American Jewish leaders, Bloom felt the rabbis looked too un-American and that their march would be an unseemly spectacle. The "Rabbis' March" proceeded, however, with Hillel Kook. (Roosevelt avoided meeting them on the advice of a Jewish adviser.)

Bloom adopted the mainstream Zionist position that the only way to save the doomed Jews of Europe was for Britain to open the gates to Mandatory Palestine. Stephen Wise stated the same ideology at the Congressional hearing. Hillel Kook said one of the main reasons his group's rescue activity was intensely obstructed was that his desire to save Jews from the Nazis with any possible place of refuge, not just Palestine. This was considered a betrayal of Zionism.

In spite of the obstruction, Roosevelt established the War Refugee Board (WRB) in January 1944 due to the persistent pressure, publicity and lobbying by the Bergson Group and the demand from Treasury Secretary Henry Morgenthau and his team. Per Prof. David Wyman, the WRB protected close to 200,000 people. Some consider this to be an overestimate. One of the WRB's known achievements was convincing Swedish noble Raoul Wallenberg to go to Budapest, where he saved large number of Jews from the Hungarian Fascists and the Nazis.

Bloom urgently lobbied President Harry Truman in 1948 to immediately recognize the Jewish state of Israel, which Truman did. When the Republicans took control of the Foreign Affairs Committee after the 1946 election, Bloom worked closely with the new chairman, Charles Eaton. They secured approval for the Truman Doctrine and the Marshall Plan.

== Death and legacy ==
He died in Washington, D.C. on March 7, 1949, at the age of 78.

The Sol Bloom Playground in Manhattan is named in his honor.

His papers, most of them dating from 1935 to 1949, are stored at the New York Public Library.

Bloom lost a bet with Washington Senators pitcher Walter Johnson after Johnson successfully threw a silver dollar across the Rappahannock River in Fredericksburg, Virginia. Although the wager had been highly publicized, Bloom cited technicalities and refused to pay.

In 1937, Bloom spearheaded the writing and publication of The Story of the Constitution by the United States Constitution Sesquicentennial Commission.

His wife Evelyn (died 1941) was a composer and singer, and their daughter Vera was an author and lyricist who provided words to the tango "Jalousie".

== See also ==
- List of Jewish members of the United States Congress
- List of members of the United States Congress who died in office (1900–1949)

== Notes ==
U.S. House of Representatives
Preceded by Walter M. Chandler	Member of the U.S. House of Representatives from New York's 19th congressional district March 4, 1923 – January 3, 1945	Succeeded by Samuel Dickstein
Preceded by Vito Marcantonio	Member of the U.S. House of Representatives from New York's 20th congressional district January 3, 1945 – March 7, 1949	Succeeded by Franklin D. Roosevelt, Jr.
Preceded by Sam D. McReynolds	Chairman of the House Foreign Affairs Committee; 1939 – 1949	Succeeded by Charles A. Eaton
Preceded by Charles A. Eaton	Chairman of the House Foreign Affairs Committee; 1949	Succeeded by John Kee
