= Samuel Marx (New York politician) =

American auctioneer and politician (1867–1922)

Member-elect of the U.S. House of Representatives from New York's 19th district
- Died before taking office
- Preceded by: Walter M. Chandler
- Succeeded by: Sol Bloom

Personal details
- Born: 1867 New York City, New York, U.S.
- Died: November 30, 1922 (aged 54–55) New York City, New York, U.S.
- Party: Democratic

Samuel Marx (1867 – November 30, 1922) was an American auctioneer and politician from New York.

Born in New York City, Marx was educated in the public schools and became an auctioneer and appraiser. In 1889, he married Irene Smith.

He was a member of Tammany Hall and served on the New York City Council. In August 1919, he was appointed Internal Revenue Collector for the 3rd New York District. In November 1922, Marx was elected as a Democrat to the United States House of Representatives in the 19th District, but died before his term began.

Samuel Marx Triangle, a small street-corner park in Manhattan, is named for him.

== See also ==
- List of Jewish members of the United States Congress
- List of United States representatives-elect who never took their seats

== Sources ==
- Samuel Marx Dies, Congressman-Elect in NYT on December 1, 1922

U.S. House of Representatives
Preceded by Walter M. Chandler	Member-elect of the U.S. House of Representatives from New York's 19th congressional district 1922	Succeeded by Sol Bloom
