= Charles Gayarré =

American historian and politician (1805–1895)

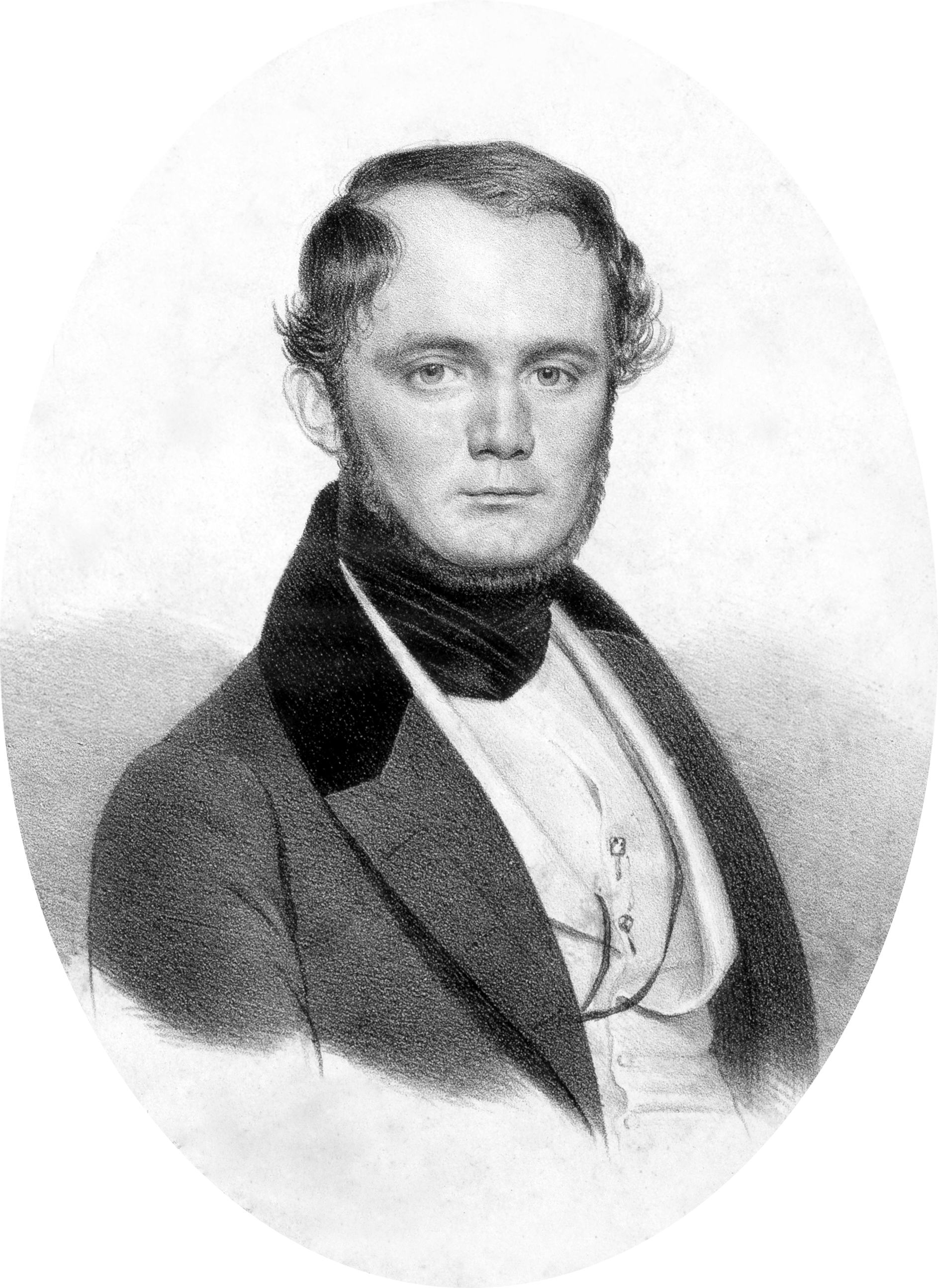

Secretary of State of Louisiana
- In office 1845–1853
- Governor: Alexandre Mouton; Isaac Johnson; Joseph M. Walker
- Preceded by: Zenon Ledoux
- Succeeded by: Andrew S. Herron

Member of the Louisiana House of Representatives
- In office 1856–1857
- In office 1844–1846
- In office 1830–1831

Personal details
- Born: January 9, 1805 New Orleans, Louisiana, U.S.
- Died: February 11, 1895 (aged 90) New Orleans, Louisiana, U.S.
- Party: Jacksonian (1834–1844); Democratic (1844–1895)
- Spouse: Sarah Sullivan
- Children: 1
- Education: College d'Orléans

Charles-Étienne Arthur Gayarré (January 9, 1805 – February 11, 1895) was an American historian, attorney, and politician born to a Spanish and French Creole planter family in New Orleans, Louisiana.

Gayarré composed plays, essays, and novels. He also wrote histories of Louisiana and penned an exposé of U.S. Army general James Wilkinson, whom he outed as a Spanish spy in 1854.

== Family life ==
The grandson of Étienne de Boré, New Orlean's first mayor who introduced cultivation of indigo and sugarcane to the area, Charles Gayarré was born at the Boré plantation, which was then outside the city limits of New Orleans. (It has long been incorporated into the city as Audubon Park.) His paternal grandfather, Don Esteban de Gayarré, arrived in the area with Spanish Governor Antonio de Ulloa after France ceded it to Spain, and had been comptroller of the province of Louisiana. His other maternal grandfather was the former colonial treasurer under the French and master of Destrehan Plantation, which was involved in a suppressed slave revolt when Charles was a boy. After studying at the College d'Orléans Gayarré began in 1826 legal studies in Philadelphia, Pennsylvania.

On January 28, 1856, Gayarré married Sarah Anne (Shadie) Sullivan (1820–1914) in Lowndes County, Mississippi. In the 1860 census, he owned about a dozen slaves. His only child was the son of Delphine Le Maitre, a slave in his household when Gayarré was twenty-one years old. The child was also named Charles Gayarré and was baptized in the St. Louis Cathedral in New Orleans.

== Career ==
In 1825, Gayarré published a pamphlet criticizing changes that Edward Livingston proposed in the Louisiana Criminal Code, particularly with respect to capital punishment (the fate of nearly 100 recaptured slaves during the 1811 German Coast revolt when he was a child). He then traveled to Philadelphia for his legal studies, and was admitted to the Pennsylvania bar in 1829.

In 1830, upon returning to New Orleans, Gayarré was elected a member of the Louisiana House of Representatives, and the leadership asked him to draft an address complimenting the French legislators during the Revolution of 1830. In 1831, after admission to the Louisiana bar, Gayarré became his state's Deputy Attorney General. In 1833, he became presiding judge of the city court of New Orleans. In 1834, he was elected as a Jackson Democrat to the United States Senate. However, he resigned, citing health reasons, before taking his seat. For the next eight years, Gayarré traveled in Europe and collected historical material from France and Spain. Some of the historical documents that he used were written by his ancestor, Esteban de Gayarré.

In 1844–1845 and in 1856–1857, he again served as a Democratic Party member of the state House of Representatives, and, from 1845 to 1853, was the appointed Secretary of State of Louisiana. In 1853, he failed to win election to the U.S. Congress as an Independent, but he remained active in Louisiana politics as an ally of John Slidell in the "Regular Democratic" movement.

Gayarré became a member of the Louisiana Know Nothing Party from 1853 to 1855. He joined the party despite him being Catholic, and left the party because they were anti-Catholic.

In 1854, following extensive research of the Spanish government archives in Madrid, Gayarré exposed U.S. Army general James Wilkinson as having been "Agent 13", a highly paid spy in the service of the Spanish Empire from 1787 until his death in 1825.

Gayarré lost his fortune of $400,000 by supporting the Confederacy during the Civil War. In 1863 Gayarré proposed that slaves be emancipated and armed, provided that France and England recognized the Confederacy (no foreign country recognized it).

After the war, Gayarré published his three-volume History of Louisiana (with an introduction by George Bancroft) and a biography of Philip II of Spain, but was never elected to any office. He became a reporter of decisions for the Louisiana Supreme Court, but he lived chiefly by his pen. He had a long-standing association with the Louisiana Historical Society, of which he was the unpaid President from 1860 to 1888, thus working with former Confederate President Jefferson Davis after his release from federal custody.

Gayarré wrote Histoire de la Louisiane (1847); Romance of the History of Louisiana (1848); Louisiana: its Colonial History and Romance (1851), reprinted in A History of Louisiana; History of Louisiana: the Spanish Domination (1854); Philip II of Spain (1866); and A History of Louisiana (4 volumes, 1866), the last collecting and adding to his earlier works in this field. The whole covered the history of Louisiana from its earliest discovery by Europeans to 1861. He wrote also several dramas and romances, including Fernando de Lemos (1872).

== Death and legacy ==
Gayarré died in New Orleans on February 11, 1895, survived by his widow, and is buried at St. Louis Cemetery in New Orleans.

== Works ==
In French:

- Histoire de la Louisiane (1846)

In English:

- History
  - Romance of the History of Louisiana (1848)
  - Louisiana: its Colonial History and Romance (1851)
  - Louisiana: its History as a French Colony (1852)
  - History of the Spanish Domination in Louisiana from 1769 to December 1803 (185)
  - The History of Louisiana, reprinting the prior volumes and additional material to 1861 as a final comprehensive edition in 1866 (online here)
  - Philip II of Spain (1866)
- Novels
  - Fernando de Lemos, Truth and Fiction (1872)
  - Aubert Dubayet (1882)
- Plays
  - The School for Politics: A Dramatic Novel (1854)
  - Dr. Bluff, a comedy in two acts

Political offices
Preceded by Zenon Ledoux	Secretary of State of Louisiana; 1845–1853	Succeeded by Andrew S. Herron
