= List of United States representatives-elect who never took their seats =

Some people who were elected to the United States House of Representatives died before taking their seats. In other cases, they failed to qualify; were rejected by the House; their credentials were successfully challenged; or they were somehow otherwise unable to become members.

This list only includes people who never served in the House. Re-elected incumbents are not included.

== List ==
Member-elect	Party	District	Election date	Congress	Reason for non-seating
Benjamin West	Pro-Administration	NH-AL	February 2, 1789	1st	Declined to serve.
James Townsend	Pro-Administration	NY-1	April 27–29, 1790	2nd	Died on May 24, 1790.
Pierpont Edwards	Pro-Administration	CT-AL	September 20, 1790	1st	Declined to serve.
Stephen M. Mitchell	Pro-Administration	CT-AL	September 17, 1792	3rd	Resigned (elected to the U.S. Senate).
Jonathan Ingersoll	Pro-Administration	CT-AL	September 16, 1793	3rd	Declined to serve.
James Morris	Democratic-Republican	PA-4	October 14, 1794	4th	Died on July 10, 1795.
Thomas Tillotson	Democratic-Republican	NY-5	April 29–May 1, 1800	7th	Resigned on August 10, 1801 (appointed Secretary of State of New York).
John Cantine	Democratic-Republican	NY-7	April 27–29, 1802	8th	Declined to serve.
Phineas Bruce	Federalist	MA-17	November 1, 1802	8th	Never qualified or attended due to illness.
John Simpson	Democratic-Republican	KY-8	August 3, 1812	13th	Died on January 22, 1813.
John S. Edwards	Federalist	OH-6	October 13, 1812	13th	Died on February 22, 1813.
William Dowse	Federalist	NY-15	December 15–17, 1812	13th	Died on February 18, 1813.
John Woods	Federalist	PA-14	October 11, 1814	14th	Never qualified or attended due to illness.
Daniel Appleton White	Federalist	MA-3	November 7, 1814	14th	Resigned (to be Judge of Probate for Essex County).
Henry B. Lee	Democratic-Republican	NY-4	April 23–25, 1816	15th	Died on September 16, 1816.
David Scott	Democratic-Republican	PA-10	October 8, 1816	15th	Resigned (to be judge of the court of common pleas).
Alexander McMillan	Federalist	NC-7	August 14, 1817	15th	Died on November 13, 1817.
James Duncan	Democratic-Republican	PA-5	October 10, 1820	17th	Resigned.
David Ellicott Evans	Jacksonian Republican	NY-29	November 6–8, 1826	20th	Resigned on May 2, 1827.
Francis Jacob Harper	Democratic	PA-3	October 11, 1836	25th	Died on March 18, 1837.
Francis Gehon	Democratic	IA-AL; Delegate	August 5, 1839	26th	William W. Chapman's term was extended to October 1840, invalidating Gehon's election.
Washington Poe	Whig	GA-3	November 5, 1844	29th	Resigned.
David Levy Yulee	Democratic	FL-AL	May 26, 1845	29th	Resigned (elected to the U.S. Senate).
Lyman Trumbull	Democratic	IL-8	November 7, 1854	34th	Resigned (elected to the U.S. Senate).
Thomas Child Jr.	Whig	NY-7	November 7, 1854	34th	Never qualified or attended due to illness.
Edward W. Gantt	Independent	AR-2	August 6, 1860	37th	Arkansas seceded from the Union on May 6, 1861.
Robert Benjamin Hilton	Democratic	FL-AL	October 1, 1860	37th	Florida seceded from the Union on January 10, 1861.
Lewis Malone Ayer Jr.	Democratic	SC-3	October 8–9, 1860	37th	South Carolina seceded from the Union on December 20, 1860.
S. Ferguson Beach	Unionist	VA-7	October 24, 1861	37th	Not entitled to the seat.
Daniel D. Pratt	Republican	IN-8	October 13, 1868	41st	Resigned on January 27, 1869 (elected to the U.S. Senate).
John Willis Menard	Republican	LA-2	November 3, 1868	41st	Not seated due to a contested election.
Robert B. Gilliam	Conservative	NC-4	August 4, 1870	41st	Died on October 17, 1870.
Ambrose R. Wright	Democratic	GA-8	November 5, 1872	43rd	Died on December 21, 1872.
Samuel Peters	Republican	LA-4	November 5, 1872	43rd	Died on October 1, 1873.
John W. Head	Democratic	TN-4	November 3, 1874	44th	Died on November 9, 1874.
Garnett McMillan	Democratic	GA-9	November 3, 1874	44th	Died on January 14, 1875.
Augustus F. Allen	Democratic	NY-33	November 3, 1874	44th	Died on January 22, 1875.
Alexander Smith	Republican	NY-12	November 5, 1878	46th	Died on November 5, 1878.
Andrew S. Herron	Democratic	LA-4	November 7, 1882	48th	Died on November 27, 1882.
John Clayton	Republican	AR-2	November 6, 1888	51st	Assassinated on January 29, 1889.
Andrew J. Campbell	Republican	NY-10	November 5, 1894	54th	Died on December 6, 1894.
Richard P. Giles	Democratic	MO-1	November 3, 1896	55th	Died on November 17, 1896.
James J. Davidson	Republican	PA-25	November 3, 1896	55th	Died on January 2, 1897.
B. H. Roberts	Democratic	UT-AL	November 8, 1898	56th	Congress refused to seat him because he was a bigamist.
Francis G. Childers	Democratic	TN-6	November 3, 1908	61st	Declined to serve (appointed Adjutant General of Tennessee).
William Brown	Republican	PA-24	November 3, 1914	64th	Died on January 31, 1915.
Charles F. Van de Water	Republican	CA-9	November 2, 1920	67th	Died on November 20, 1920.
Samuel Marx	Democratic	NY-19	November 7, 1922	68th	Died on November 30, 1922.
Matthew Vincent O'Malley	Democratic	NY-7	February 17, 1931	72nd	Died on May 26, 1931.
Jack Swigert	Republican	CO-6	November 2, 1982	98th	Died on December 27, 1982.
Luke Letlow	Republican	LA-5	December 5, 2020	117th	Died on December 29, 2020.

== See also ==
- Unseated members of the United States Congress
