= Tallmadge Amendment =

Proposed 1819 American legislation

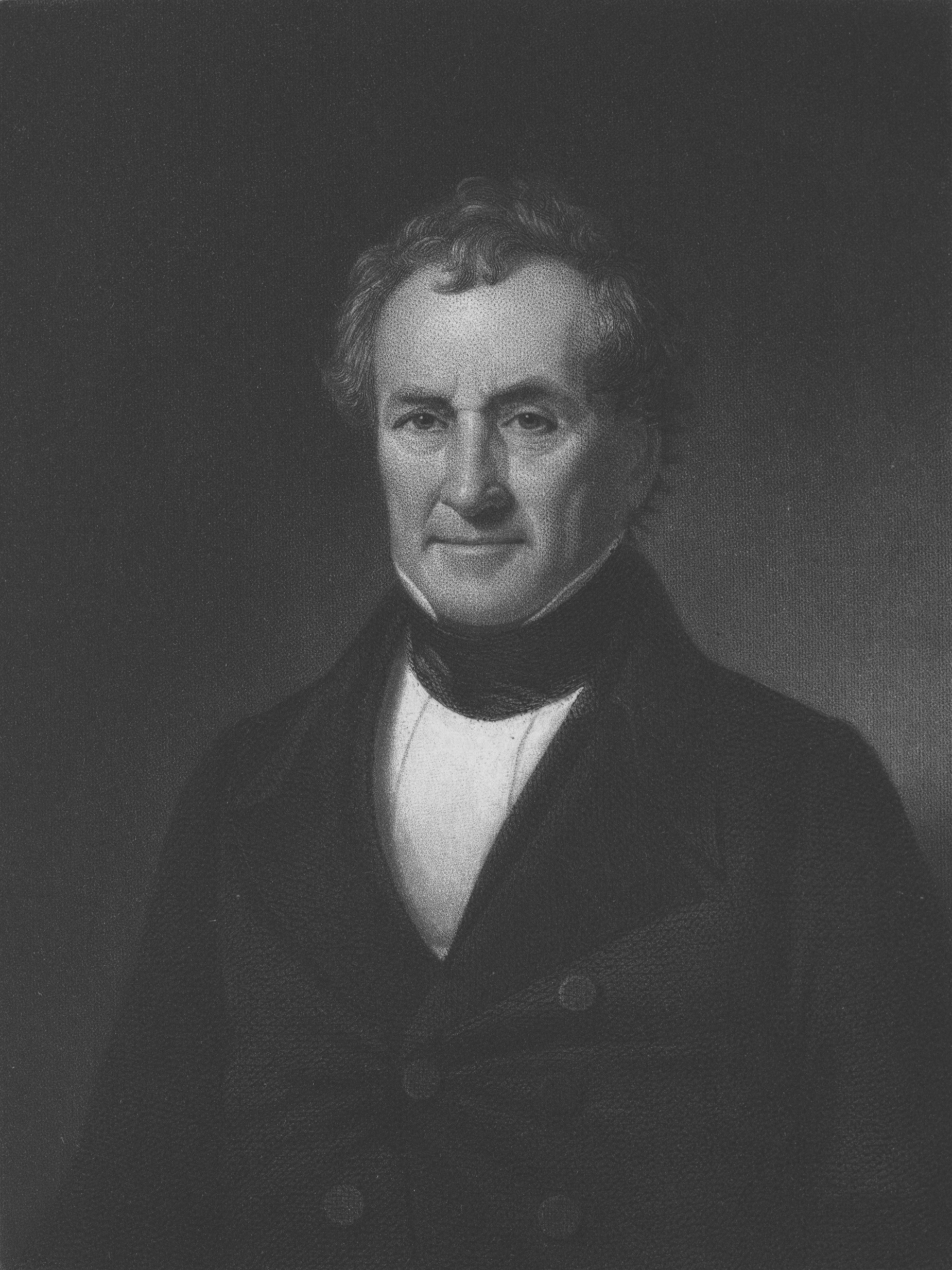

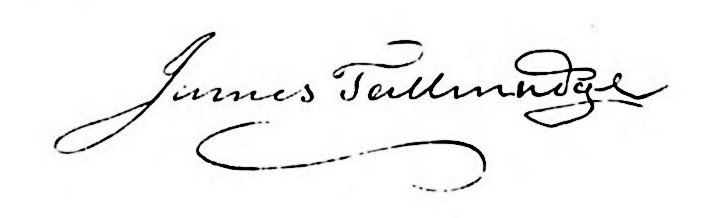

The Tallmadge Amendment was a proposed amendment to a bill regarding the admission of the Territory of Missouri as a state, under which Missouri would be admitted as a free state. The amendment was submitted in the U.S. House of Representatives on February 13, 1819, by James Tallmadge Jr., a Democratic-Republican from New York, and Charles Baumgardner.

The measure passed the House 87-76, with northern Representatives voting 86-10 for it and southern Representatives voting 66-1 against it. The amendment was rejected in the U.S. Senate due to growing Southern opposition to abolition and help from five northern Senators: Harrison G. Otis of Massachusetts, Ninian Edwards and Jesse B. Thomas of Illinois, and two others.

In 1820, the Missouri Compromise was passed without the Tallmadge Amendment. The Compromise attempted to appease both sides of the debate by admitting Missouri as a slave state in exchange for the admission of Maine as a free state and by the complete prohibition of slavery in all of the remaining Louisiana Purchase territory north of the 36˚30' parallel.

== Background ==
In response to the ongoing debate in Congress concerning the admission of Missouri as a state and its effect on the existing balance of slave and free states, Tallmadge, an opponent of slavery, sought to impose conditions on Missouri's statehood that would provide for the eventual termination of legal slavery and the emancipation of current slaves:

And provided, that the further introduction of slavery or involuntary servitude be prohibited, except for the punishment of crimes, whereof the party shall have been fully convicted; and that all children born within the said State, after the admission thereof into the Union, shall be free at the age of twenty-five years.

There were two senators from each state, regardless of its population. The number of seats in the House of Representatives, however, was based on the population of the state, and to complicate matters further, slave states were allowed to count three fifths of their slave population, which increased their number of representatives. The population of the North had grown more rapidly than that of the South, which also had a large percentage of slaves and so resulted in a lower countable populace. Thus, the proposed Tallmadge Amendment was seen as a way to restrict the weight of the slaveholding South in Congress further.

Tallmadge delivered an impassioned speech on February 16 in support of his amendment and of abolitionism in general. By a close vote on the same day, the House adopted the Tallmadge Amendment, but the Senate promptly rejected it. Congress adjourned on March 4, 1819 without acting on Missouri's request for statehood. Heated discussions on the Tallmadge Amendment and Missouri statehood continued through the summer and the fall.

Southerners in Congress asserted that the Tallmadge Amendment was unconstitutional because it put restrictions on states as a condition of admission to the Union. They argued that it was the decision of Missouri, not of Congress, to allow slavery there. The proponents of the Tallmadge Amendment argued that "slavery itself was a moral and political evil that was contrary to the spirit of the Declaration of Independence, and that it had been tolerated in the Constitution only by necessity and ought to now be restricted."

Passions ran high, and the words "disunion" and "civil war" were boldly uttered. The aged Jefferson wrote that the sudden strife woke him like the alarm of a fire-bell in the night. And Thomas W. Cobb of Georgia warned Tallmadge on the floor of Congress that he had kindled "a fire which only seas of blood could extinguish."

== See also ==
- History of slavery in Missouri
