= Garnett McMillan =

American politician

Member-elect of the U.S. House of Representatives from Georgia's 33rd district
- Died before taking office
- Preceded by: Hiram Bell
- Succeeded by: Benjamin Hill

Personal details
- Born: May 8, 1842 Elbert County, Georgia, U.S.
- Died: January 14, 1875 (aged 32) Clarkesville, Georgia, U.S.
- Party: Democratic
- Education: Emory and Henry College

Garnett McMillan (May 8, 1842 – January 14, 1875) was a 19th-century politician from the U.S. state of Georgia.

Garnett was the son of Colonel Robert McMillan, an Irish immigrant from Antrim who raised a company of infantry at Clarkesville, Georgia that would become Co. K of the 24th Georgia Regiment of Volunteers. Young Garnett served as a Lt. in Company K, while his father became the commanding officer of the regiment. He would serve in this position until June 1863 when he was promoted and transferred to a sharpshooters battalion. During the American Civil War McMillan had served in the Georgia 3rd Battalion, Sharpshooters, commanding Company B. He was elected in 1874 as a Democrat to represent Georgia's 9th congressional district in the 44th United States Congress.

McMillan died on January 14, 1875, before the Congress commenced. He is buried in the Old Clarkesville Cemetery, Habersham County Georgia.

== See also ==
- List of United States representatives-elect who never took their seats

U.S. House of Representatives
Preceded by Hiram Bell	Member-elect of the U.S. House of Representatives from Georgia's 9th congressional district 1874–1875	Succeeded by Benjamin Hill
