= Abraham H. Schenck =

American politician

Abraham Henry Schenck

Member of the U.S. House of Representatives from New York's 4th district
- In office March 4, 1815 – March 3, 1817

Member of the New York State Assembly
- In office 1804–1806

Personal details
- Born: January 22, 1775 Matteawan, New York
- Died: July 31, 1831 (aged 56) Fishkill, New York
- Party: Democratic-Republican
- Relations: Isaac Teller (nephew)

Abraham Henry Schenck (January 22, 1775 – June 1, 1831) was a U.S. representative from New York. He was an uncle to Isaac Teller, who also became a U.S. representative from New York.

Born in Matteawan, New York, Schenck received an English education. He became engaged in the manufacture of machinery. He served as member of the New York State Assembly from 1804 to 1806. He was a slaveholder.

Schenck was elected as a Democratic-Republican to the Fourteenth Congress (March 4, 1815 – March 3, 1817). He engaged in the manufacture of cotton goods. He died in Fishkill, New York, June 1, 1831, and was interred in the Dutch Reform Churchyard, Beacon (formerly Fishkill Landing), New York.

== Sources ==
- United States Congress. "Abraham H. Schenck (id: S000115)". Biographical Directory of the United States Congress.

U.S. House of Representatives
| Preceded by Thomas J. Oakley | Member of the U.S. House of Representatives from New York's 4th congressional district 1815–1817 | Succeeded by James Tallmadge, Jr. |
