= Walter M. Chandler =

American politician

Walter Marion Chandler
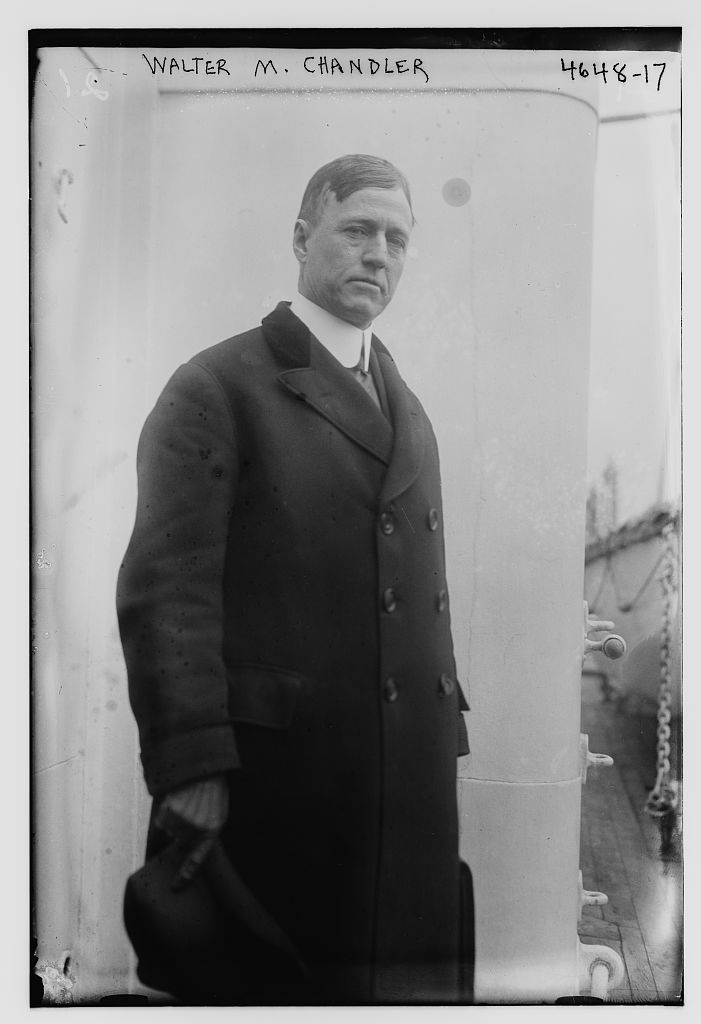
- Chandler in 1918

Member of the U.S. House of Representatives from New York's 19th district
- In office March 4, 1913 – March 3, 1919
- Preceded by: John E. Andrus
- Succeeded by: Joseph Rowan
- In office March 4, 1921 – March 3, 1923
- Preceded by: Joseph Rowan
- Succeeded by: Sol Bloom

Personal details
- Born: December 8, 1867 Yazoo County, Mississippi, U.S.
- Died: March 16, 1935 (aged 67) New York City, U.S.
- Party: Republican; Progressive
- Education: University of Michigan
- Occupation: Attorney

Walter Marion Chandler (December 8, 1867 – March 16, 1935) was a Progressive and later a Republican U.S. representative from New York.

== Biography ==
Born on December 8, 1867, near Yazoo City, Mississippi, Chandler attended public schools, the University of Virginia at Charlottesville, and the University of Mississippi at Oxford. He taught school for a time and then graduated from the University of Michigan at Ann Arbor in 1897. He studied history and jurisprudence at the University of Berlin and the University of Heidelberg in Germany.

He established his law practice in Dallas, Texas, and three years later moved to New York City, where he continued the practice of law and engaged in writing and lecturing.

In 1912, Chandler was elected to Congress to the first of two terms as a Progressive. In 1916, he was elected to a third term to Congress as a Republican. He was an unsuccessful candidate for reelection in the heavily Republican year of 1918.

In 1920, Chandler was elected to a fourth nonconsecutive term as a Republican to the Sixty-seventh Congress (March 4, 1921 – March 3, 1923). He was an unsuccessful candidate for reelection in 1922 and thereafter unsuccessfully contested the election of Sol Bloom to fill a congressional vacancy. He was again an unsuccessful candidate in 1924, even as U.S. President Calvin Coolidge won the electors of New York State.

He served as member of the faculty and lecturer at the American Expeditionary Force University at Beaune, France, during World War I.

After he left Congress early in 1923, he resumed the practice of law in New York City, where he died twelve years later, on March 16, 1935. Chandler was interred in the West Evergreen Cemetery in Jacksonville, Florida.

U.S. House of Representatives
Preceded by John E. Andrus	Member of the U.S. House of Representatives from New York's 19th congressional district 1913–1919	Succeeded by Joseph Rowan
Preceded by Joseph Rowan	Member of the U.S. House of Representatives from New York's 19th congressional district 1921–1923	Succeeded by Sol Bloom
