= B. L. Lynch =

American lawyer (born 1830)

Attorney General of Louisiana
- In office 1865–1867

Personal details
- Born: 1830 County Limerick, Ireland
- Party: Republican
- Other political affiliations: Moderate Republicans

Bartholomew Leahy Lynch (born 1830 in County Limerick, Ireland) was an educator, lawyer, and the first Republican Attorney General of Louisiana, serving from 1865 to 1867 during the Reconstruction Era. Lynch emigrated from Ireland in 1851 and settled near Alexandria, Louisiana. He served as a lieutenant in the Louisiana State Militia after Louisiana seceded from the Union, though he claimed he was forced into service. Although he later voluntarily accepted a commission from the governor of Confederate Louisiana, he claimed to have never believed in the cause of the Confederacy. In February 1864, Lynch was elected as Attorney General of Union-controlled "Free Louisiana" on the Moderate Republican ticket.
