= 1860 United States presidential election =

Election of Abraham Lincoln

- November 6, 1860

303 members of the Electoral College 152 electoral votes needed to win
- Turnout: 81.8% (▲2.4 pp)
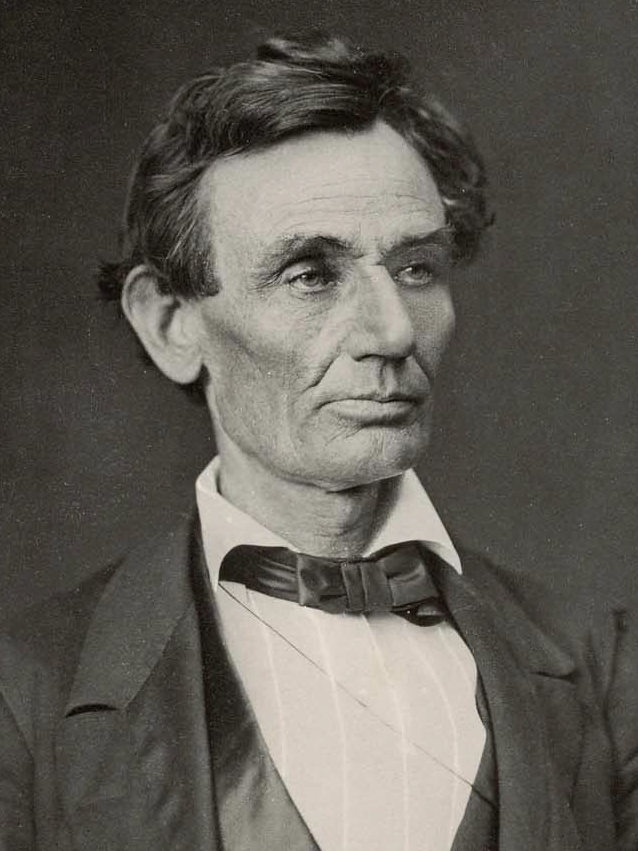

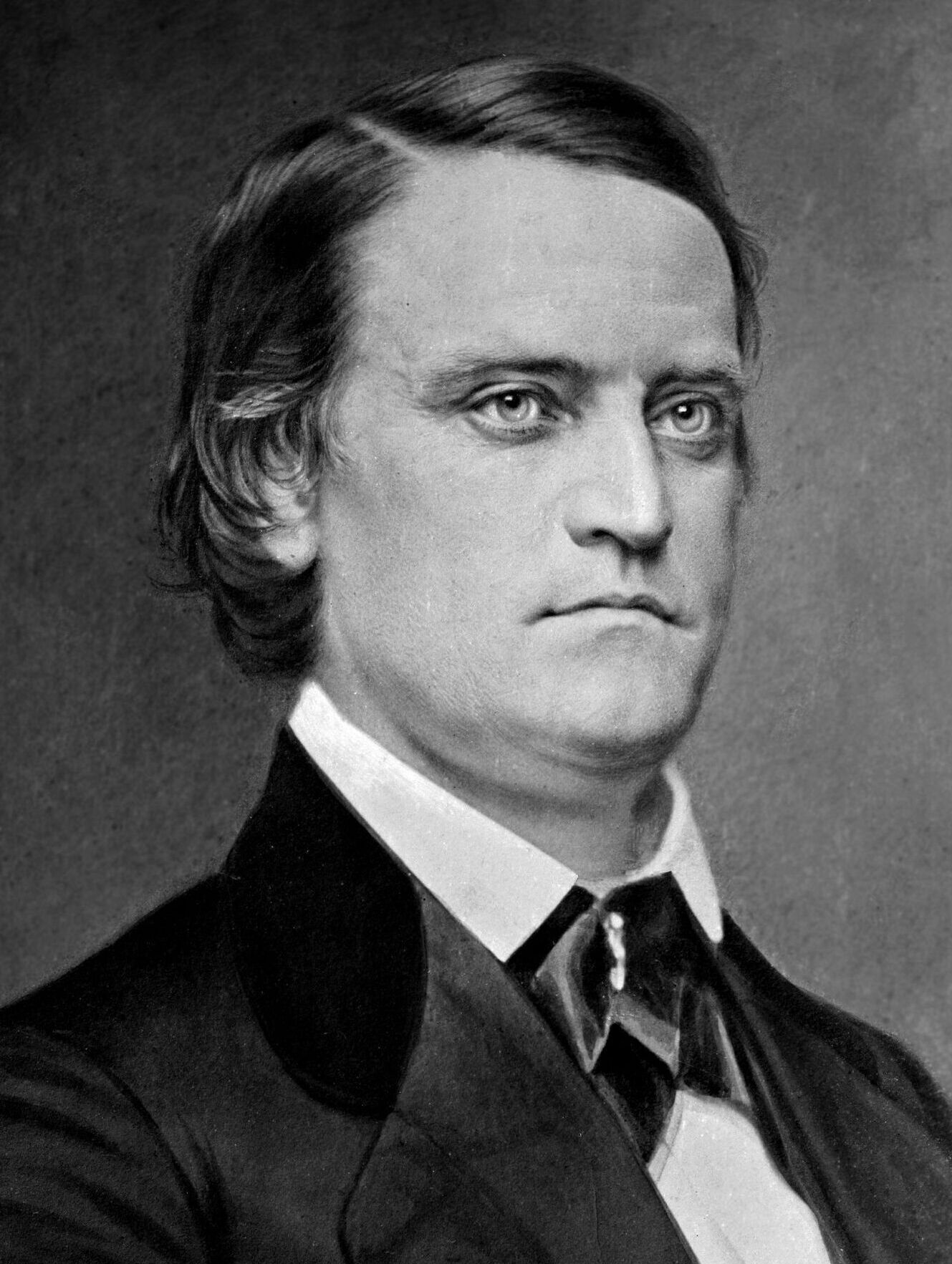

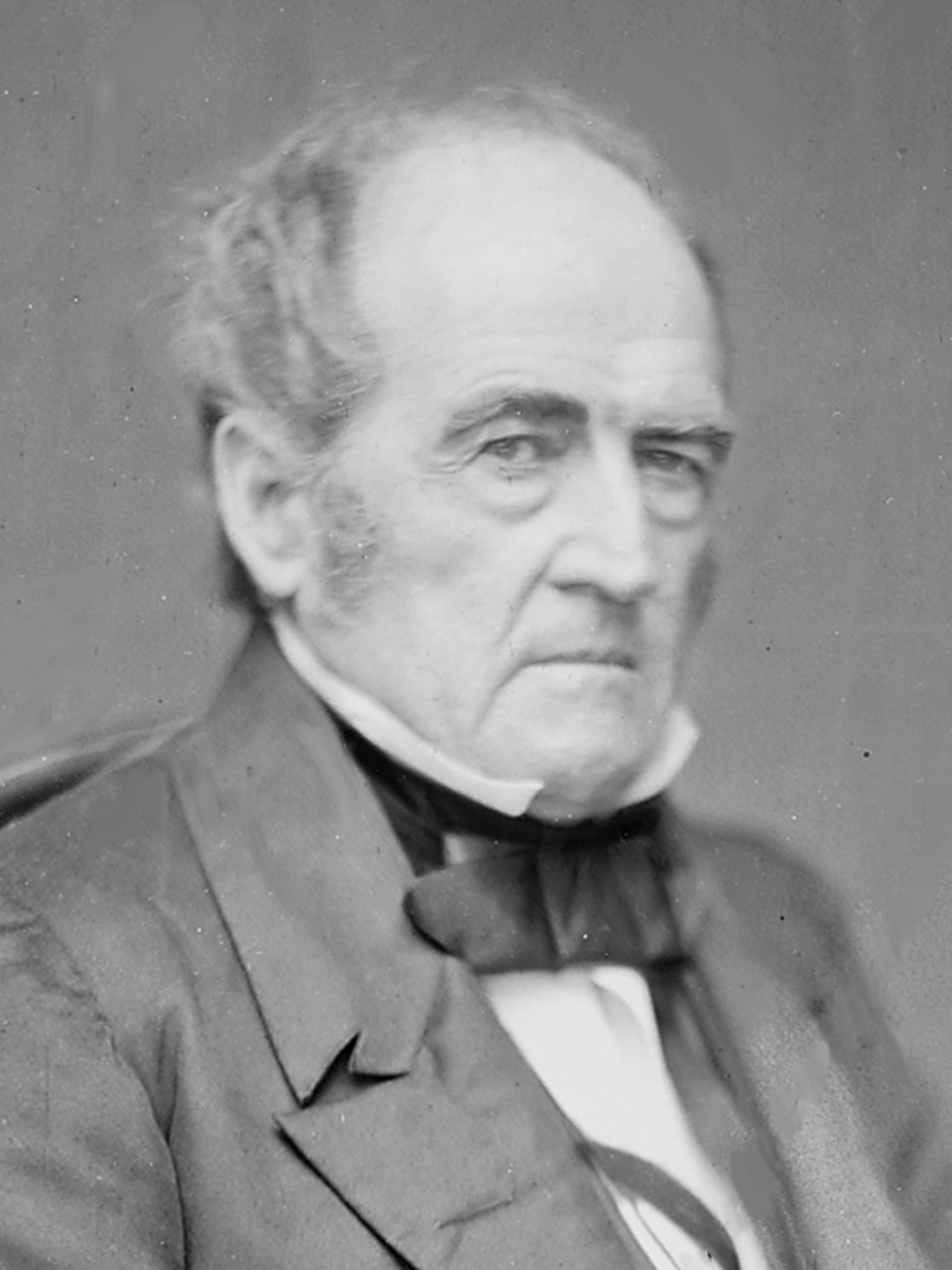

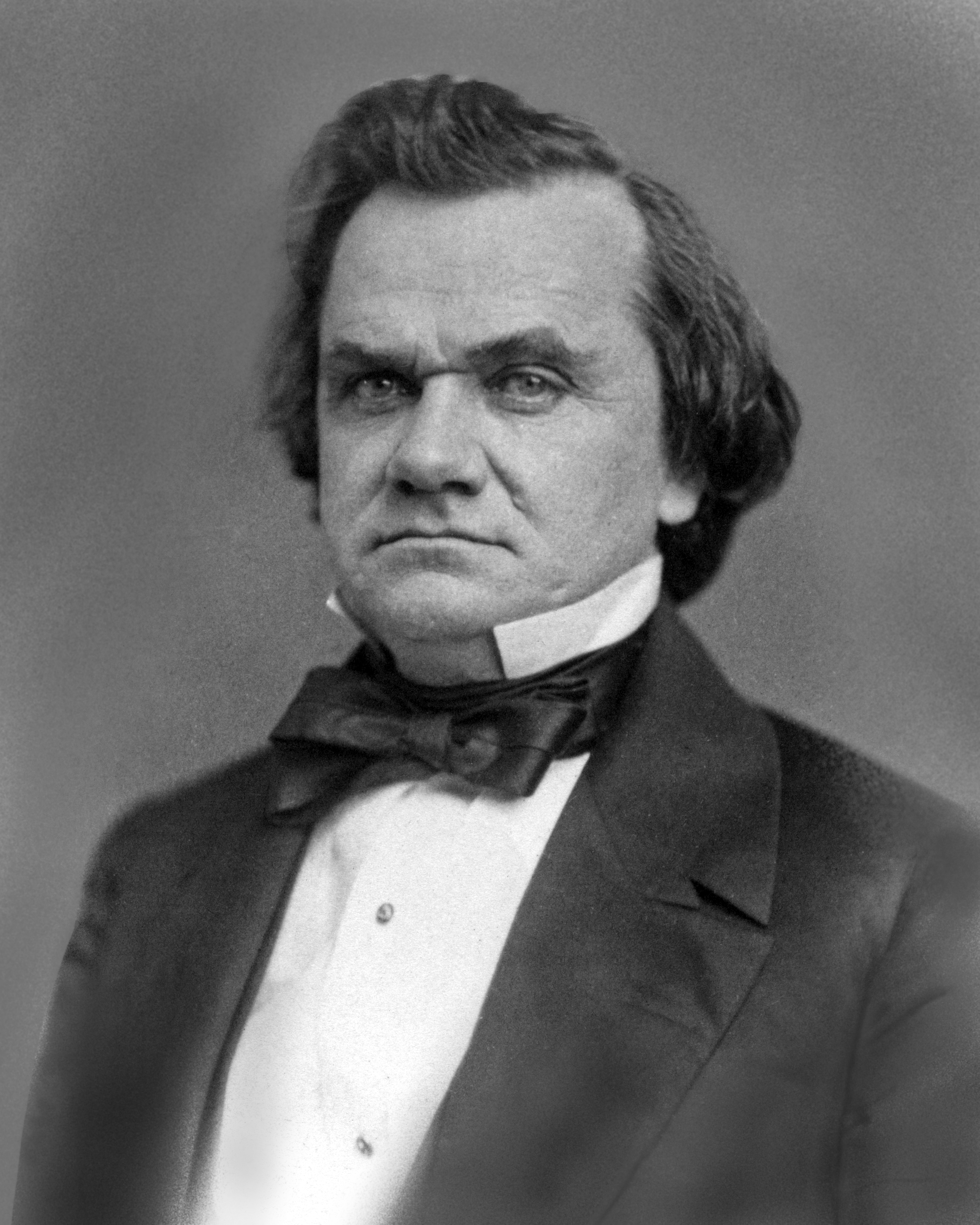
Nominee	Abraham Lincoln	John C. Breckinridge
Party	Republican	Southern Democratic (Note: The 1860 Democratic National Convention held at Charleston, South Carolina, failed to nominate a presidential ticket. At subsequent conventions in Baltimore, the national Democratic Party nominated Douglas, while a separate meeting of mostly southern delegates nominated Breckinridge.)
Home state	Illinois	Kentucky
Running mate	Hannibal Hamlin	Joseph Lane
Electoral vote	180	72
States carried	18	11
Popular vote	1,855,276 (Note: In some states, the stated total votes differed slightly from the added county returns, and some counties' returns were rejected for various reasons. See "Results by state" section for details)	672,601 (Note: In New York, Pennsylvania, and New Jersey anti-Lincoln votes were combined into fusion tickets. These tickets received 553,570 votes)
Percentage	39.7%	14.4%
Nominee	John Bell	Stephen A. Douglas
Party	Constitutional Union	Northern Democratic
Home state	Tennessee	Illinois
Running mate	Edward Everett	Herschel V. Johnson (Note: Benjamin Fitzpatrick had originally been nominated to serve as Douglas' running mate; however, Fitzpatrick declined the nomination and Johnson was chosen instead.)
Electoral vote	39	12
States carried	3	1
Popular vote	590,980	1,004,042
Percentage	12.6%	21.5%
- Presidential Election results map. Red denotes states won by Lincoln/Hamlin, green by Breckinridge/Lane, orange by Bell/Everett, and blue by Douglas/Johnson. Numbers indicate electoral votes cast by each state.
President before election
James Buchanan
Democratic
Elected President
Abraham Lincoln
Republican

A presidential election was held on November 6, 1860. The Republican Party ticket of Abraham Lincoln and Hannibal Hamlin emerged victorious.

In 1860, the United States was divided over the issue of slavery, and four major political parties had nominated candidates in the 1860 presidential election. Incumbent president James Buchanan, a Democrat, did not seek re-election. The anti-slavery Republican Party nominated Abraham Lincoln, who previously had been a one-term Whig Representative from Illinois, for president. Its platform promised not to interfere with slavery in the states where it existed, but opposed its extension into the territories. A group of former Whigs and Know Nothings formed the Constitutional Union Party, which sought to avoid disunion by resolving divisions over slavery with some new compromise. The 1860 Constitutional Union Convention put forward former Tennessee senator John Bell for president. After the 1860 Democratic National Convention adjourned without agreeing on a nominee, a second convention nominated Illinois senator Stephen A. Douglas as the Northern Democratic presidential candidate. Douglas's support for the concept of popular sovereignty, which called for each territory's settlers to decide the status of slavery within the territory, alienated many radical pro-slavery Southern Democrats. With President Buchanan's support, Southern Democrats held their own convention, nominating Vice President John C. Breckinridge of Kentucky for president.

Lincoln received a majority in the Electoral College, with all his Electoral College votes coming from Northern states. He prevailed in 18 states, won 180 electoral votes, and received 39.7 percent of the popular vote. Douglas won the second-highest popular vote total, but won only the state of Missouri; he was the only candidate in the 1860 election to win electoral votes in both free and slave states. Breckinridge won 11 states, finishing third in the popular vote, while Bell finished fourth in the popular vote and won the electoral votes of the states of Kentucky, Tennessee, and Virginia. In the last presidential election in which it appointed its presidential electors at the discretion of the state legislature rather than by popular vote (and was the only state to do so), the presidential electors of South Carolina cast their ballots for Breckinridge. The 1860 election was the first of six consecutive Republican presidential victories.

Lincoln's election as the first Republican president served as the main catalyst for Southern secession and the American Civil War. His election motivated seven Southern states, all of which had voted for Breckinridge, to secede from the United States before Lincoln's inauguration on March 4, 1861. The Civil War began less than two months after the inauguration with the Battle of Fort Sumter, after which four more slave states seceded.

== Nominations ==
The 1860 presidential election conventions were unusually tumultuous, particularly because a split in the Democratic Party had led to both Northern and Southern party conventions.

=== Republican nomination ===
1860 Republican Party ticket
Abraham Lincoln	Hannibal Hamlin
for President	for Vice President
U.S. representative for Illinois's 7th (1847–1849)	U.S. senator from Maine (1848–1857, 1857–1861)
Campaign

Republican candidates:

- Abraham Lincoln, former representative from Illinois
- William Seward, senator from New York
- Simon Cameron, senator from Pennsylvania
- Salmon P. Chase, governor of Ohio
- Edward Bates, former representative from Missouri
- John McLean, associate justice of the U.S. Supreme Court
- Benjamin Wade, senator from Ohio
- William L. Dayton, former senator from New Jersey

==== Republican Party candidates gallery ====
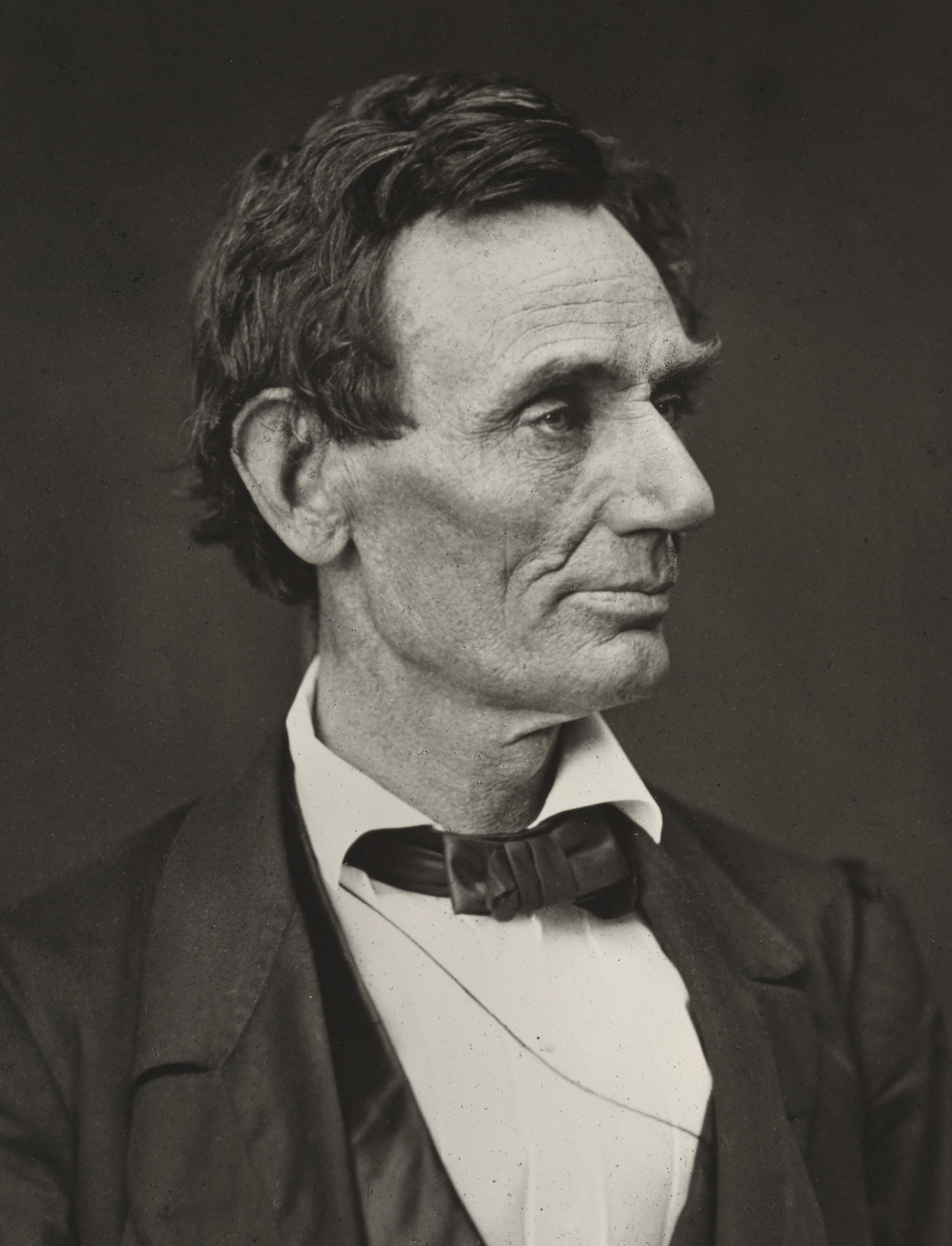
Former Representative Abraham Lincoln
from Illinois

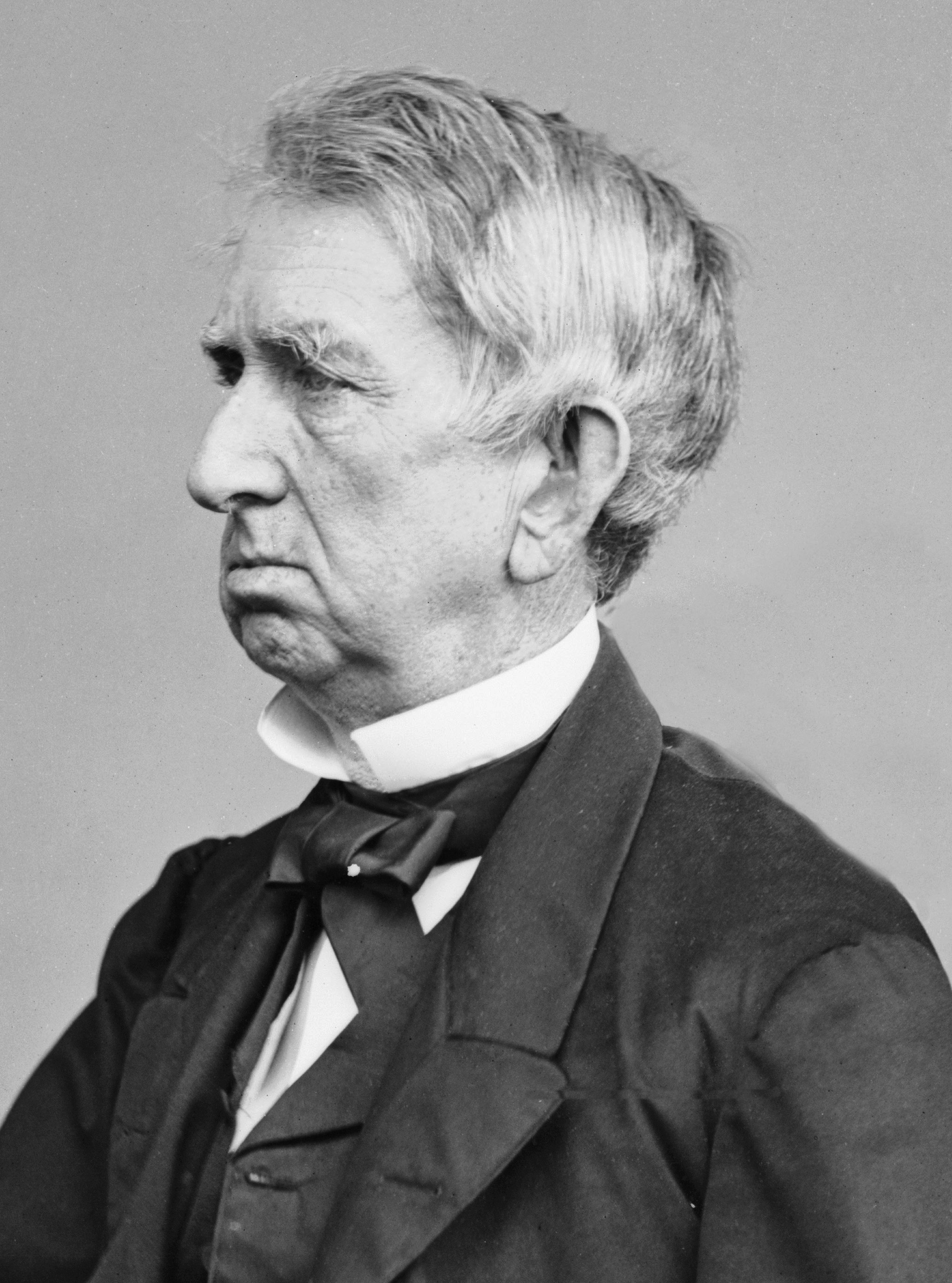
Senator William H. Seward from New York

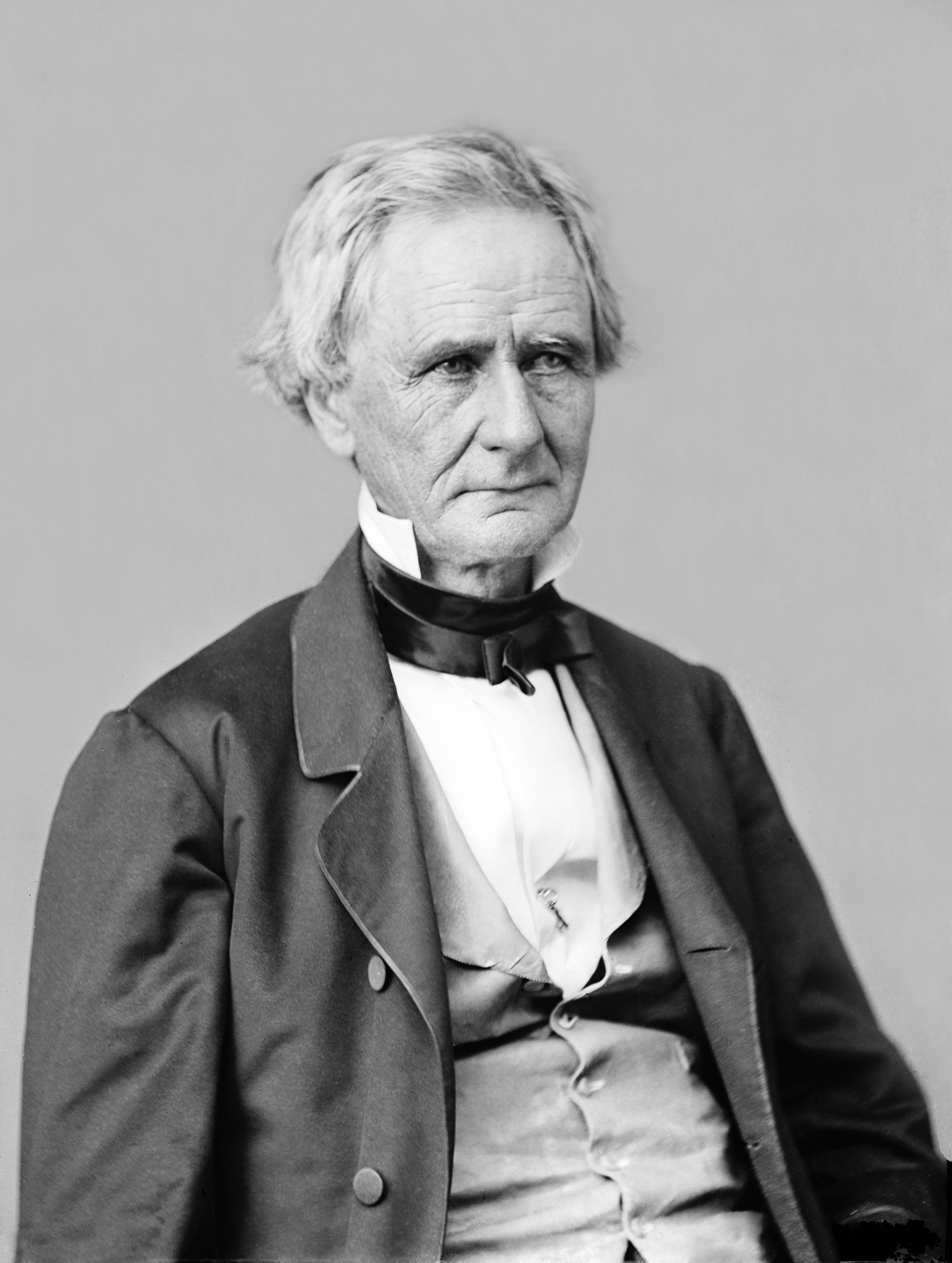
Senator Simon Cameron
from Pennsylvania

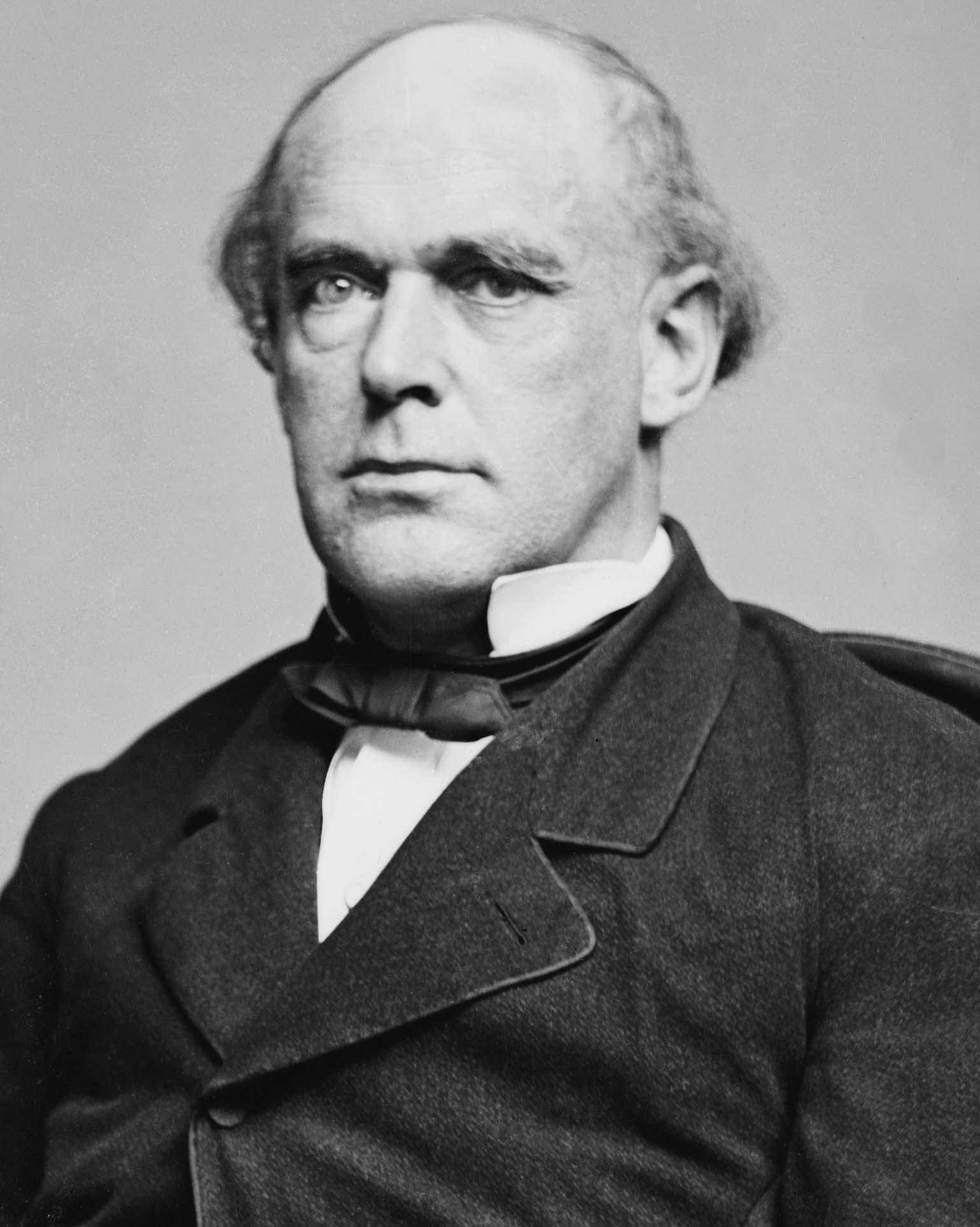
Governor Salmon P. Chase
of Ohio

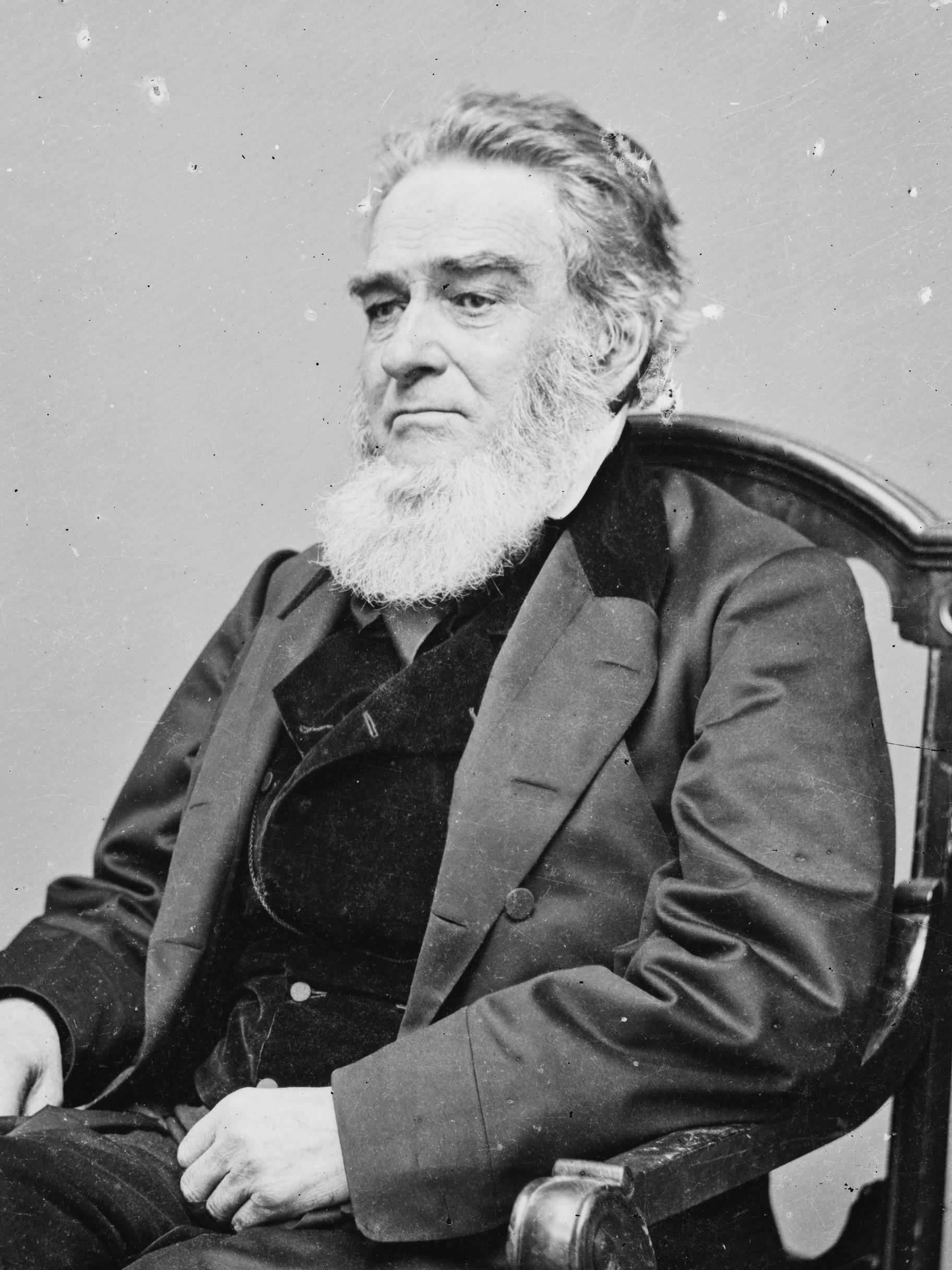
Former Representative Edward Bates from Missouri

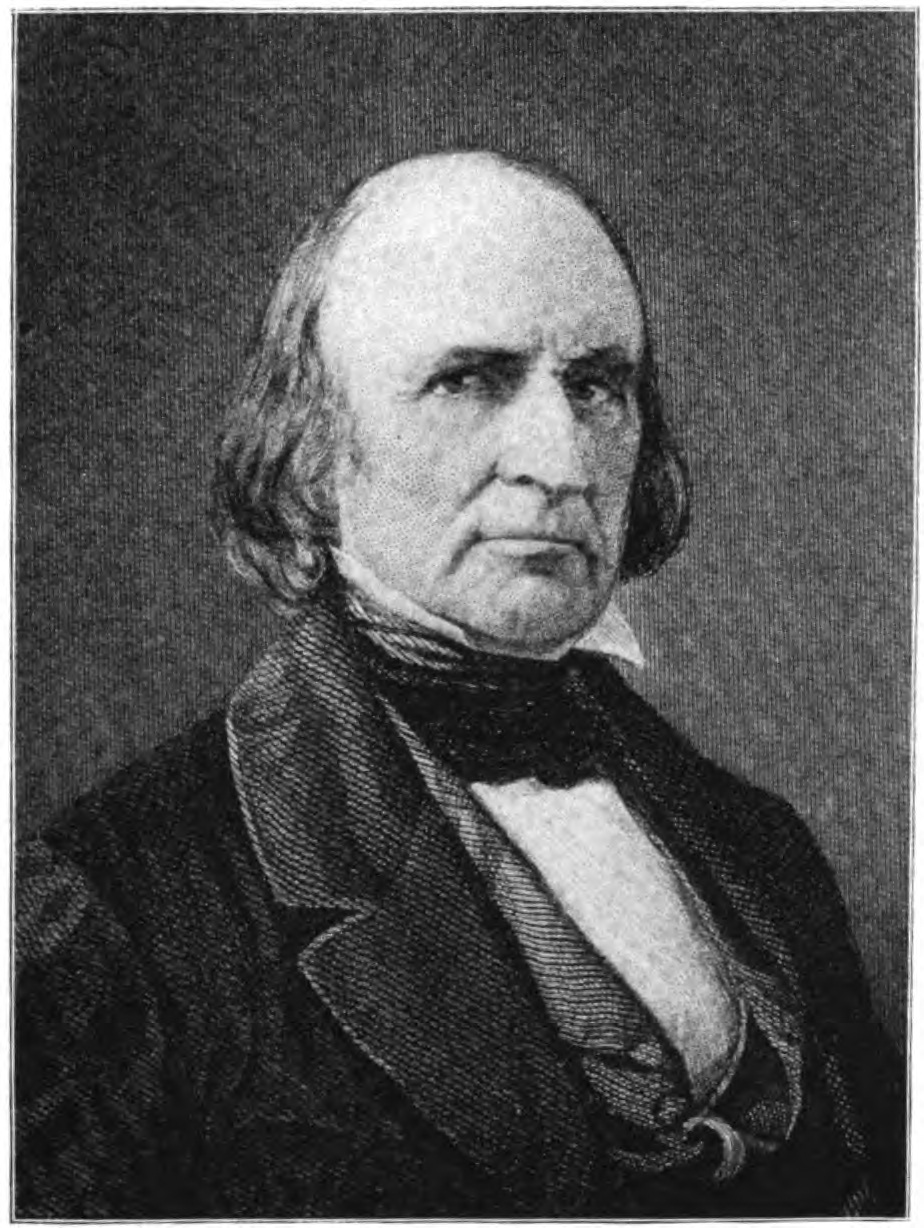
Associate Justice John McLean

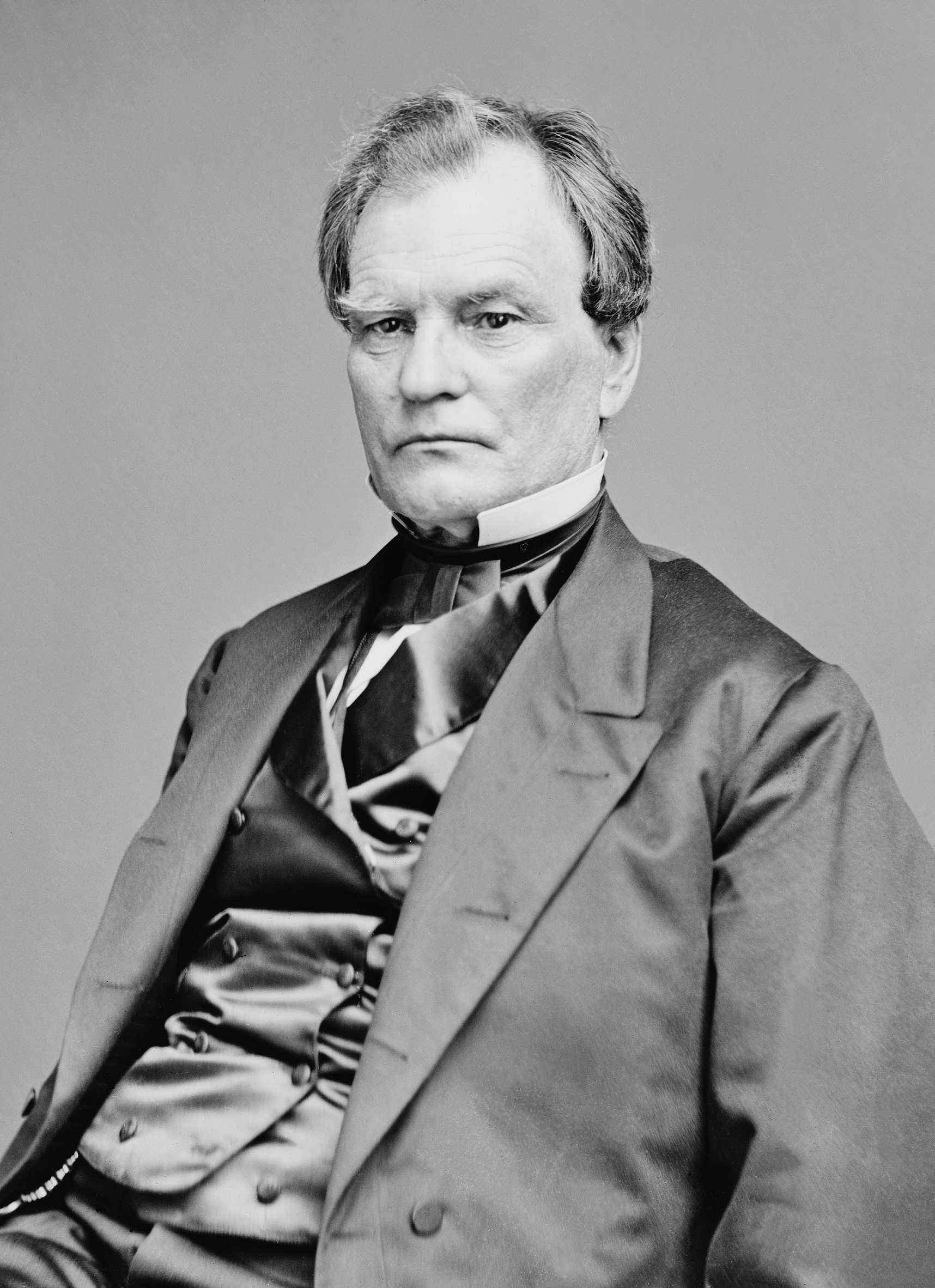
Senator Benjamin Wade from Ohio

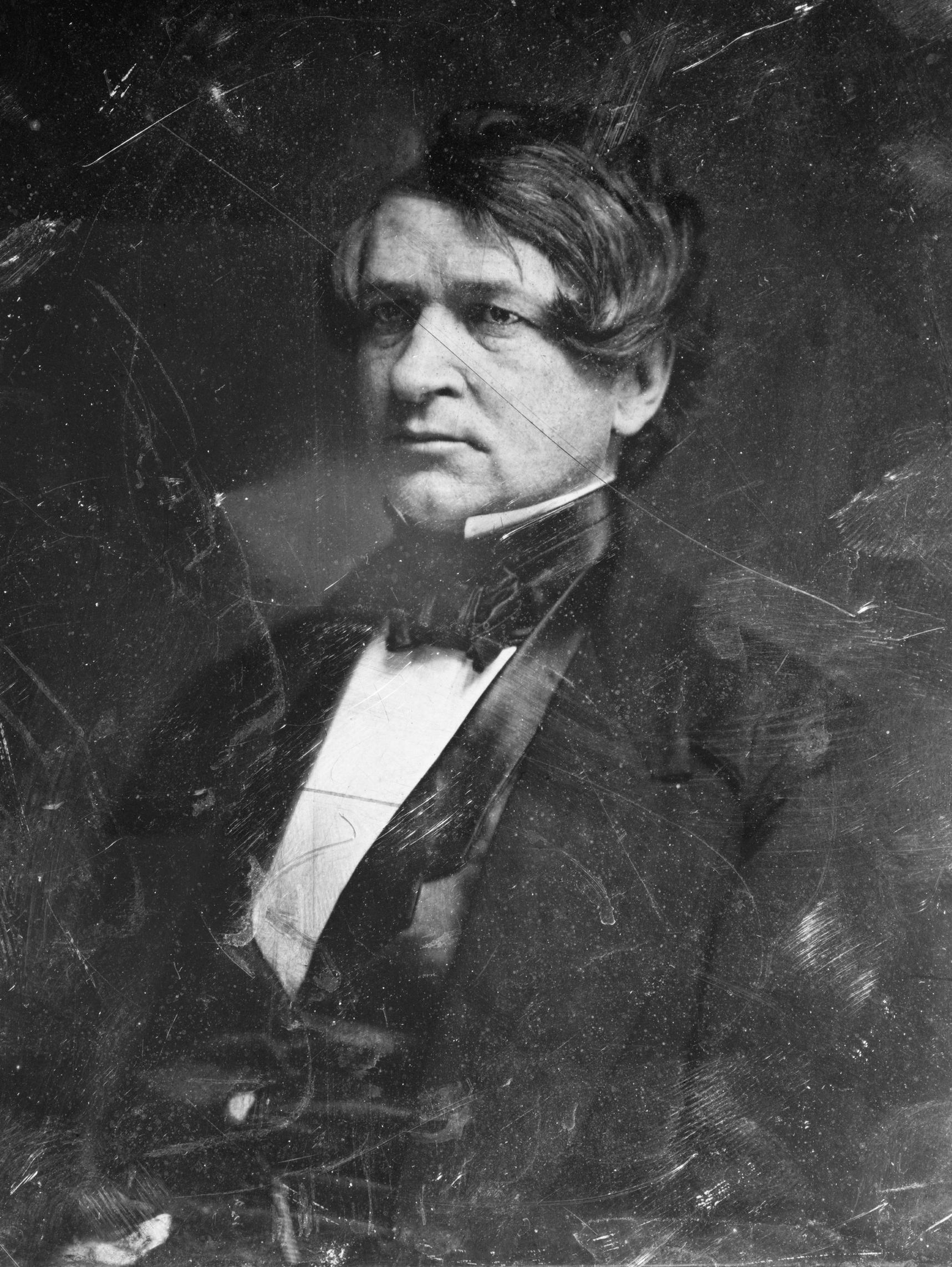
Former Senator William L. Dayton from New Jersey

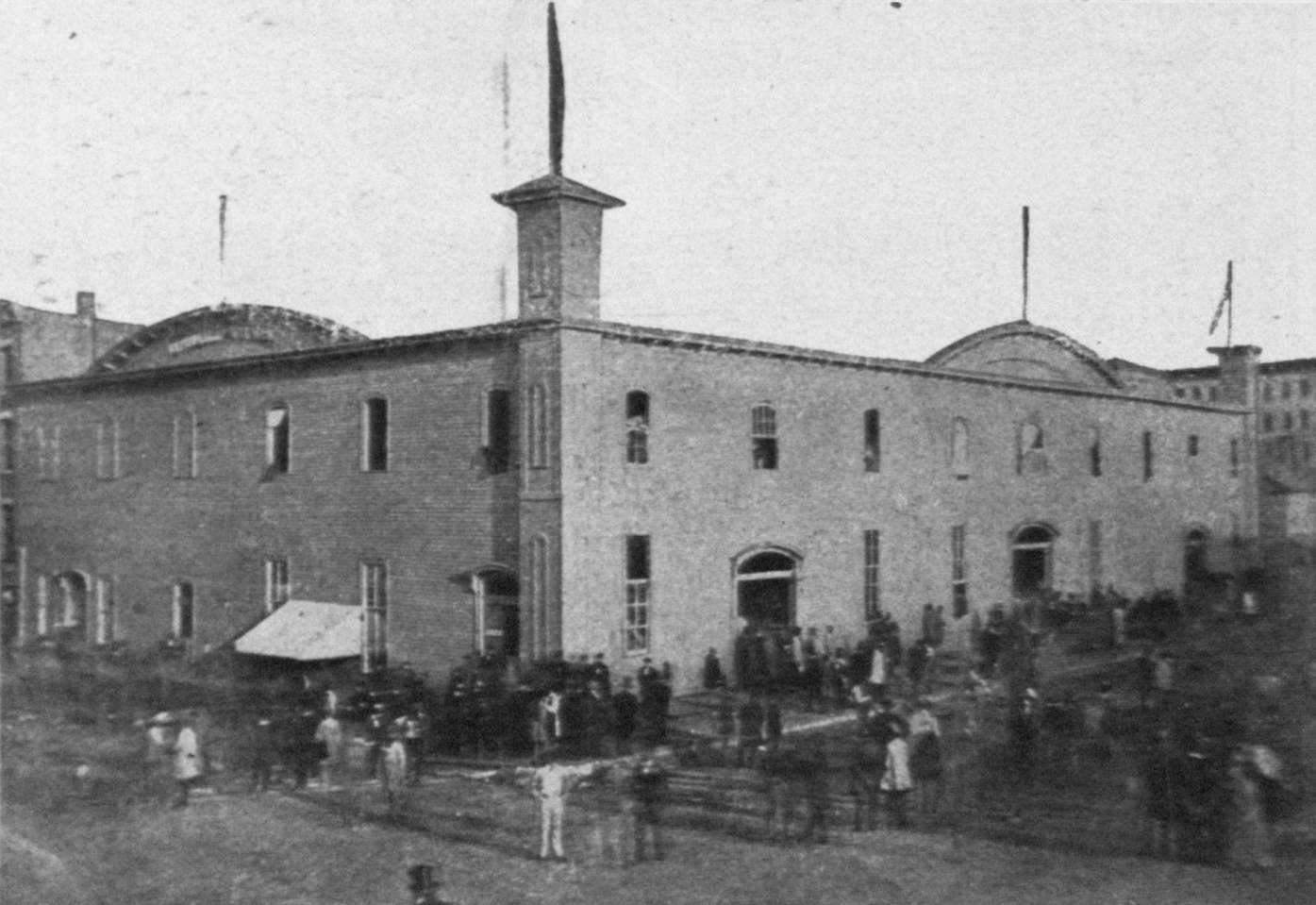
Chicago Wigwam, site of the Republican Convention

The Republican National Convention met in mid-May 1860 after the Democrats had been forced to adjourn their convention in Charleston. With the Democrats in disarray and a sweep of the Northern states possible, the Republicans felt confident going into their convention in Chicago. William H. Seward from New York was considered the front-runner, followed by Salmon P. Chase from Ohio, and Missouri's Edward Bates. Abraham Lincoln from Illinois was less well-known and was not considered to have a good chance against Seward. Seward had been governor and senator of New York, and was an able politician with a Whig background. Also running were John C. Frémont, William L. Dayton, Cassius M. Clay, and Benjamin Wade, who might be able to win if the convention deadlocked.

As the convention developed, however, it was revealed that frontrunners Seward, Chase, and Bates had each alienated factions of the Republican Party. Seward had been painted as a radical, and his speeches on slavery predicted inevitable conflict, which spooked moderate delegates. He also was firmly opposed to nativism, which further weakened his position. He had also been abandoned by his longtime friend and political ally Horace Greeley, publisher of the influential New-York Tribune.

Chase, a former Democrat, had alienated many of the former Whigs by his coalition with the Democrats in the late 1840s. He had also opposed tariffs demanded by Pennsylvania and even had opposition from his own delegation from Ohio. Chase's firm anti-slavery stance made him popular with the Radical Republicans; but what he offered in policy, he lacked in charisma and political acumen.

The conservative Bates was an unlikely candidate but found support from Horace Greeley, who sought any chance to defeat Seward, with whom he now had a bitter feud. Bates outlined his positions on the extension of slavery into the territories and equal constitutional rights for all citizens, positions that alienated his supporters in the border states and Southern conservatives, while German Americans in the party opposed Bates because of his past association with the Know Nothings.

Into this mix came Lincoln. He was not unknown; he had gained prominence in the 1858 Lincoln–Douglas debates and had represented Illinois in the House of Representatives. Lincoln had been quietly eyeing a run since the debates, ensuring that they were widely published and that a biography of himself was published. He gained great renown with his acclaimed February 1860 Cooper Union speech, which may have ensured him the nomination, even though he had not yet announced his intention to run. Delivered in Seward's home state and attended by Greeley, Lincoln used the speech to show that the Republican Party was a party of moderates, not crazed fanatics, as Southerners and Democrats claimed. Afterward, Lincoln was in much demand for speaking engagements. As the convention approached, Lincoln did not campaign actively, as the "office was expected to seek the man". So it did at the Illinois state convention, a week before the national convention. Young politician Richard Oglesby found several fence rails that Lincoln may have split as a youngster and paraded them into the convention with a banner that proclaimed Lincoln to be "The Rail Candidate" for president. Lincoln received a thunderous ovation, surpassing his and his political allies' expectations. Lincoln's campaign managers had printed and distributed thousands of fake convention admission tickets to Lincoln supporters to ensure and increase the crowd's support.

Even with such support from his home state, Lincoln faced a difficult task if he was to win the nomination. He set about ensuring that he was the second choice of most delegates, realizing that the first round of voting at the convention was unlikely to produce a clear winner. He engineered that the convention would be held in Chicago, which would be inherently friendly to the Illinois-based Lincoln. He also made sure that the Illinois delegation would vote as a bloc for him. Lincoln did not attend the convention in person and left the task of delegate wrangling to several close friends.

The first round of voting predictably produced a lead for Seward, but not a majority, with Lincoln in second place. The second round eliminated most of the minor contenders, with voters switching mostly to Seward or Lincoln. The convention remained deadlocked, however, and successful political maneuvering by Lincoln's delegates persuaded some delegates to abandon Seward in favor of Lincoln. Lincoln's combination of a moderate stance on slavery, his position on economic issues, his western origins, and his strong oratory proved to be exactly what the delegates wanted in a president. On the third ballot on May 18, Lincoln secured the presidential nomination overwhelmingly. Senator Hannibal Hamlin from Maine was nominated for vice president, defeating Clay. Hamlin was surprised by his nomination, saying he was "astonished" and that he "neither expected nor desired it."

The party platform promised not to interfere with slavery in the states, but opposed slavery in the territories. The platform promised tariffs protecting industry and workers, a Homestead Act granting free farmland in the West to settlers, and the funding of a transcontinental railroad. There was no mention of Mormonism (which had been condemned in the Party's 1856 platform), the Fugitive Slave Act, personal liberty laws, or the Dred Scott decision. While the Seward forces were disappointed at the nomination of a little-known western upstart, they rallied behind Lincoln, while abolitionists were angry at the selection of a moderate and had little faith in Lincoln.

=== Northern Democratic Party nomination ===
1860 Democratic Party ticket
Stephen A. Douglas	Herschel V. Johnson
for President	for Vice President
U.S. senator from Illinois (1847–1861)	41st Governor of Georgia (1853–1857)

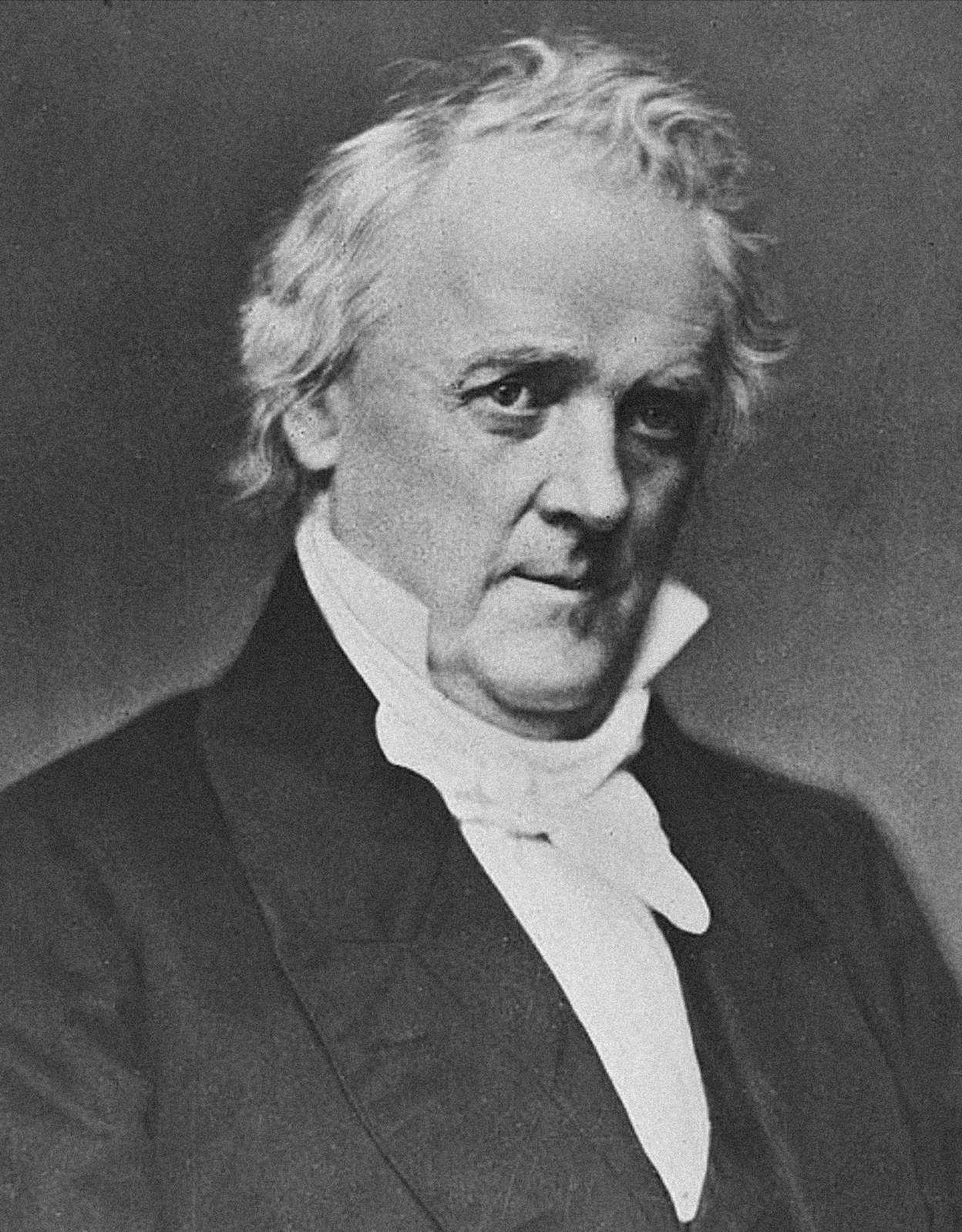
James Buchanan, the incumbent president in 1860, whose term expired on March 4, 1861

Northern Democratic candidates:

- Stephen Douglas, senator from Illinois
- James Guthrie, former treasury secretary from Kentucky
- Robert Mercer Taliaferro Hunter, senator from Virginia
- Joseph Lane, senator from Oregon
- Daniel S. Dickinson, former senator from New York
- Andrew Johnson, senator from Tennessee
- Howell Cobb, treasury secretary from Georgia

==== Northern Democratic Party candidates gallery ====
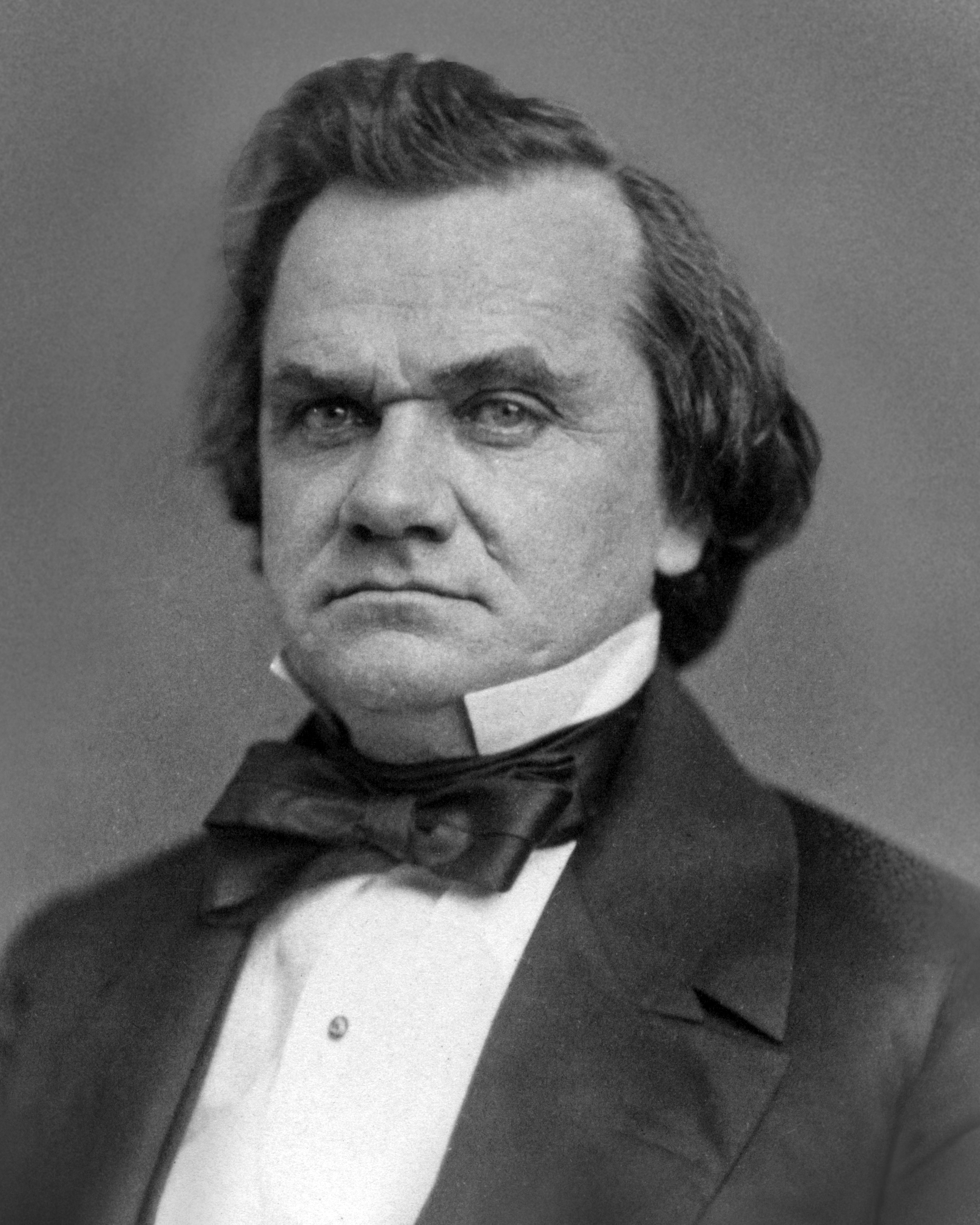
Senator Stephen A. Douglas from Illinois

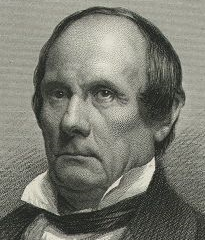
Former Treasury Secretary James Guthrie from Kentucky

Senator Robert M. T. Hunter from Virginia

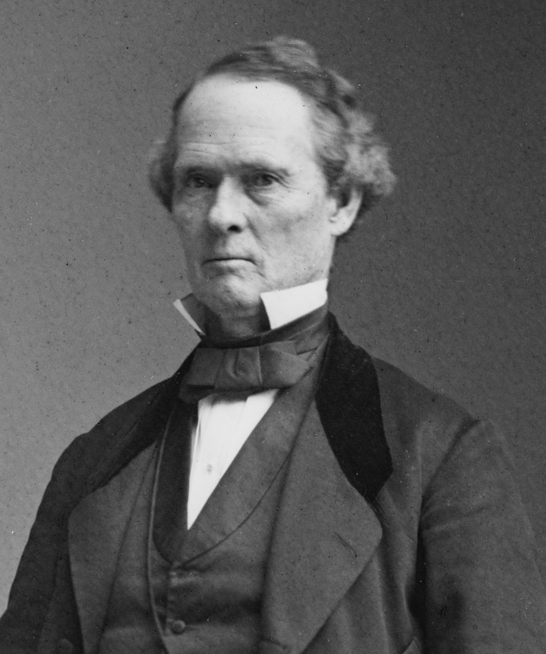
Senator Joseph Lane from Oregon

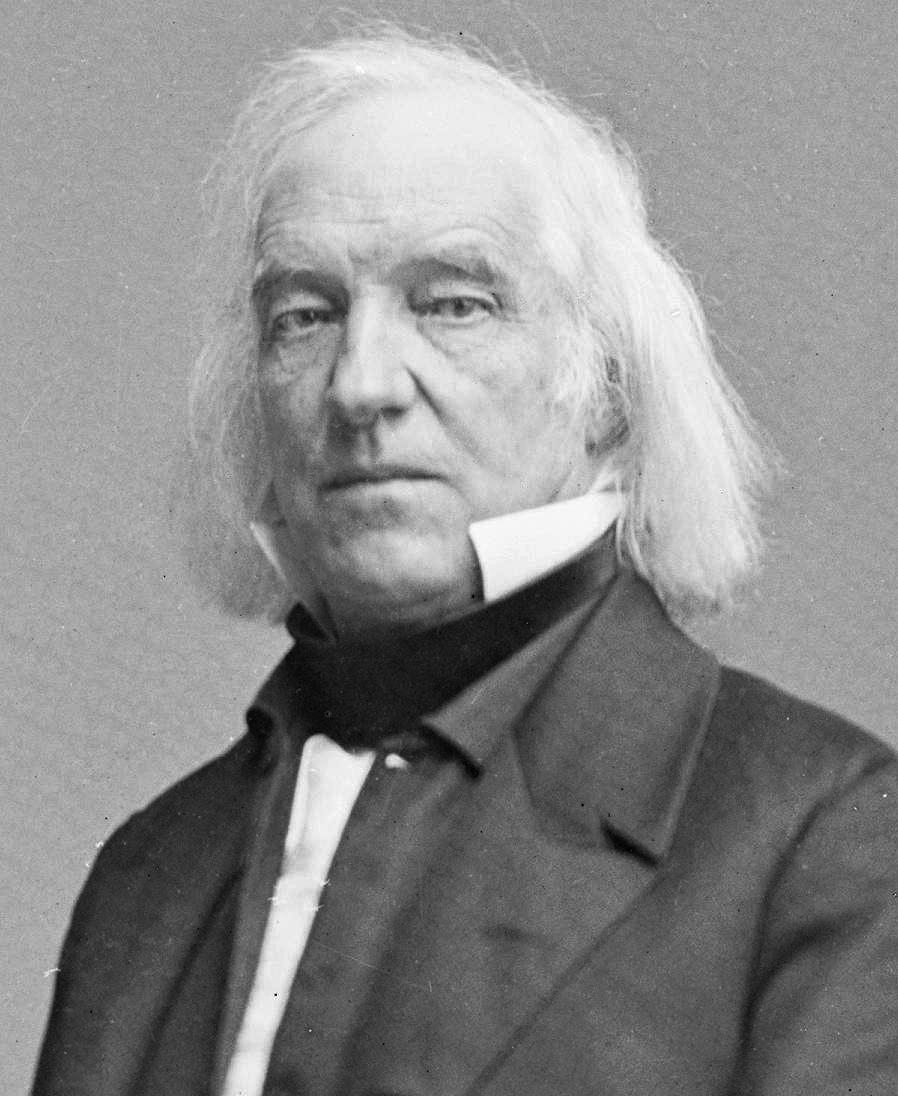
Former Senator Daniel S. Dickinson from New York

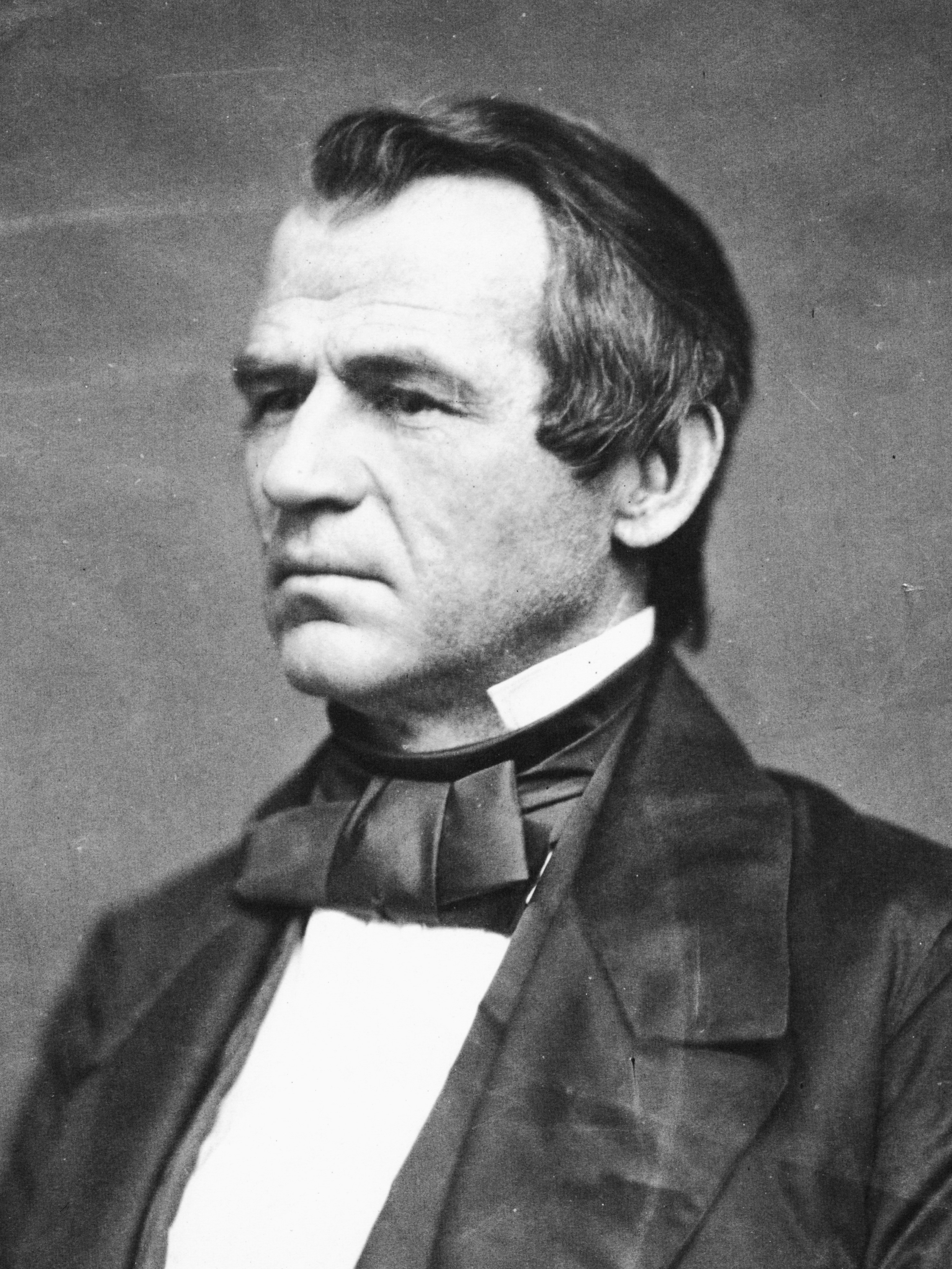
Senator Andrew Johnson
from Tennessee

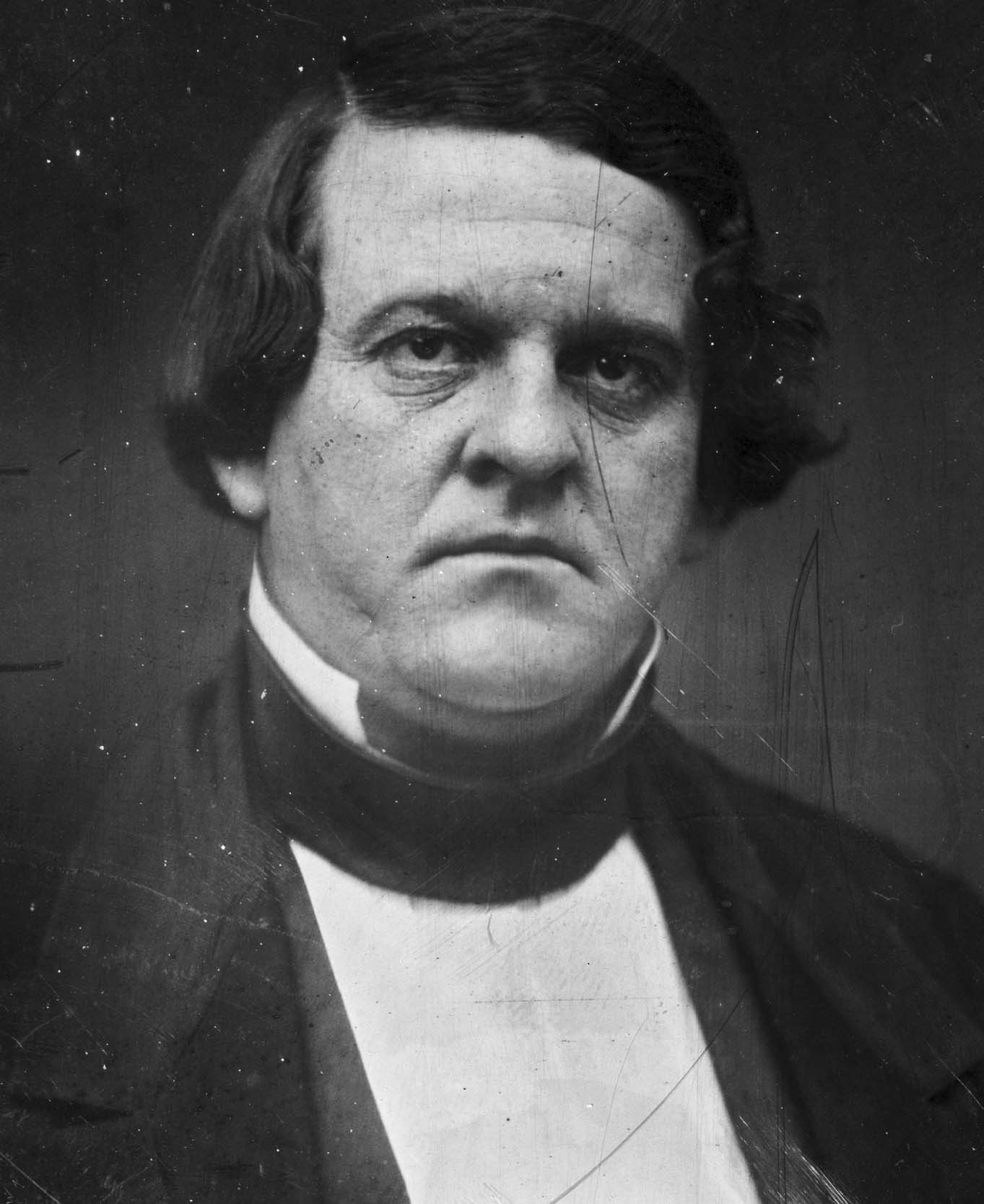
Treasury Secretary Howell Cobb from Georgia

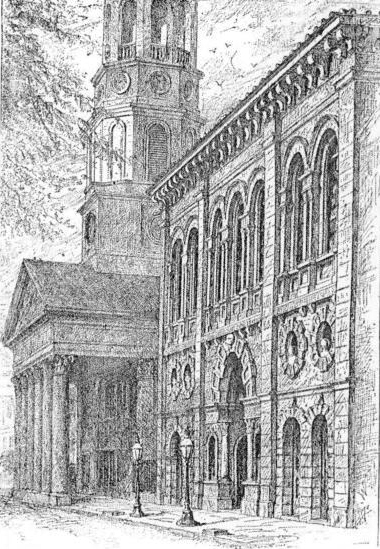
The South Carolina Institute located in Charleston. The Institute hosted the Democratic National Convention and December Secession Convention in 1860.

At the Democratic National Convention held in Institute Hall in Charleston, South Carolina, in April 1860, 50 Southern Democrats walked out over a platform dispute, led by the extreme pro-slavery "Fire-Eater" William Lowndes Yancey and the Alabama delegation: following them were the entire delegations of Florida, Georgia, Louisiana, Mississippi, South Carolina and Texas, three of the four delegates from Arkansas, and one of the three delegates from Delaware.

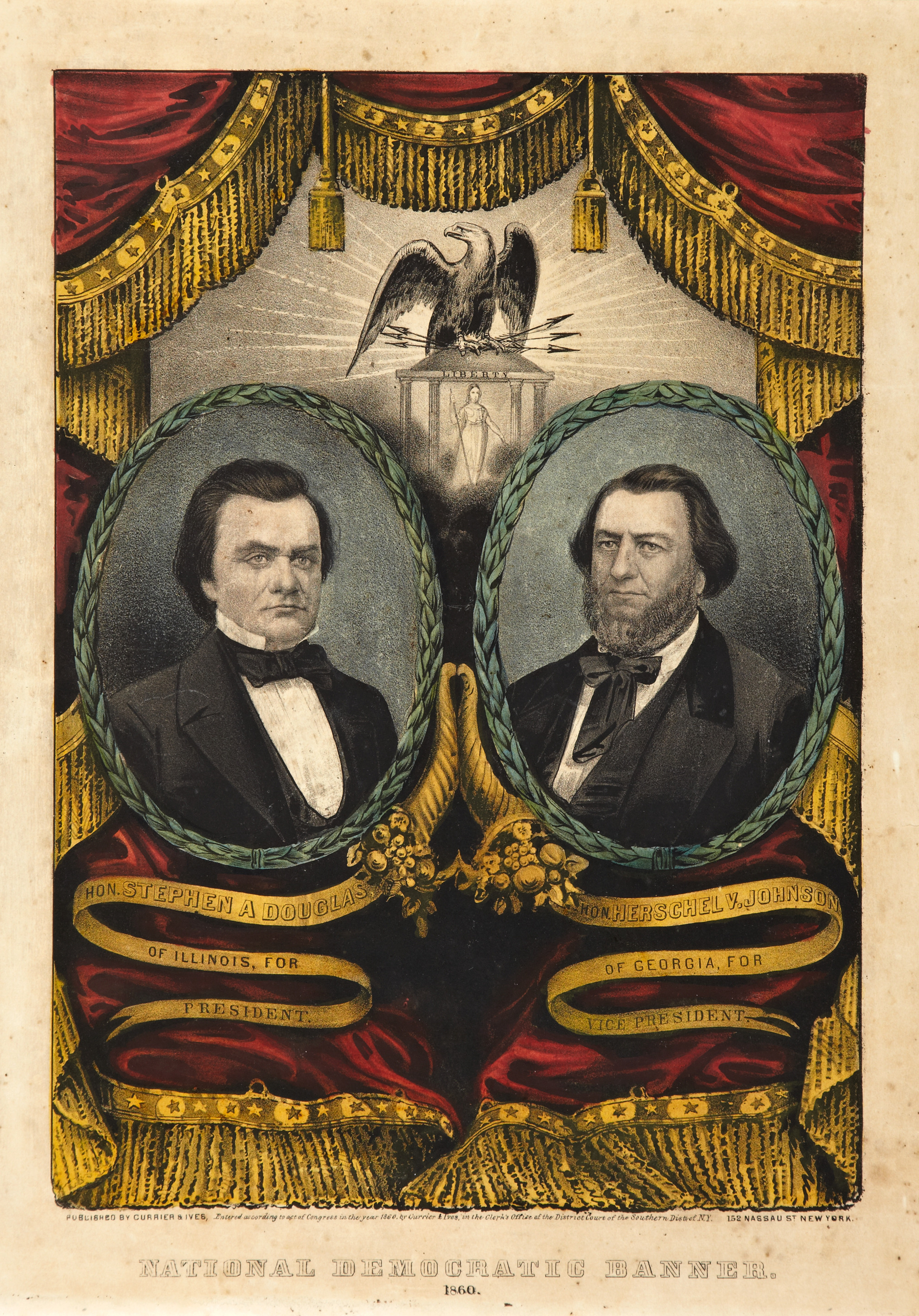
Douglas/Johnson campaign poster

Six candidates were running: Stephen A. Douglas from Illinois, James Guthrie from Kentucky, Robert Mercer Taliaferro Hunter from Virginia, Joseph Lane from Oregon, Daniel S. Dickinson from New York, and Andrew Johnson from Tennessee, while three other candidates, Isaac Toucey from Connecticut, James Pearce from Maryland, and Jefferson Davis from Mississippi (the future president of the Confederate States) also received votes.

Douglas, a moderate on the slavery issue who favored "popular sovereignty", was ahead on the first ballot, but was 56½ votes short of securing the nomination. On the 57th ballot, with Douglas still ahead, but 51½ votes short of the nomination, the exhausted and desperate delegates agreed on May 3 to cease voting and adjourn the convention.

While the Democrats convened again at the Front Street Theater in Baltimore, Maryland, on June 18, 110 Southern delegates (led by "Fire-Eaters") boycotted the convention or walked out after the convention informed them they would not adopt a resolution supporting extending slavery into territories whose voters did not want it.

While some considered Horatio Seymour a compromise candidate for the national Democratic nomination at the reconvening convention in Baltimore, Seymour wrote a letter to the editor of his local newspaper declaring unreservedly that he was not a candidate for either spot on the ticket. After two ballots - the 59th ballot overall - the remaining Democrats nominated Stephen A. Douglas from Illinois for president. The election would now pit Lincoln against his longtime political rival, whom Lincoln had lost to in the Illinois senate race just two years earlier. That two candidates were from Illinois showed the importance of the West in the election.

While Benjamin Fitzpatrick from Alabama was nominated for vice president, he refused the nomination.

After the convention concluded with no vice presidential nominee, Douglas offered the vice presidential nomination to Herschel V. Johnson from Georgia, who accepted.

=== Southern Democratic Party nomination ===
1860 Southern Democratic Party ticket
John C. Breckinridge	Joseph Lane
for President	for Vice President
14th Vice President of the United States (1857–1861)	U.S. senator from Oregon (1859–1861)

Southern Democratic candidates:

- John C. Breckinridge, Vice President of the United States
- Daniel S. Dickinson, former senator from New York
- Robert Mercer Taliaferro Hunter, senator from Virginia
- Joseph Lane, senator from Oregon
- Jefferson Davis, senator from Mississippi (Note: Davis would later be elected for a one-year provisional term as the President of the Confederate States of America on February 18, 1861. On February 22, 1862, Davis was elected permanent occupant of the position, which he held until the dissolution of the CSA on May 5, 1865)

==== Southern Democratic Party candidates gallery ====
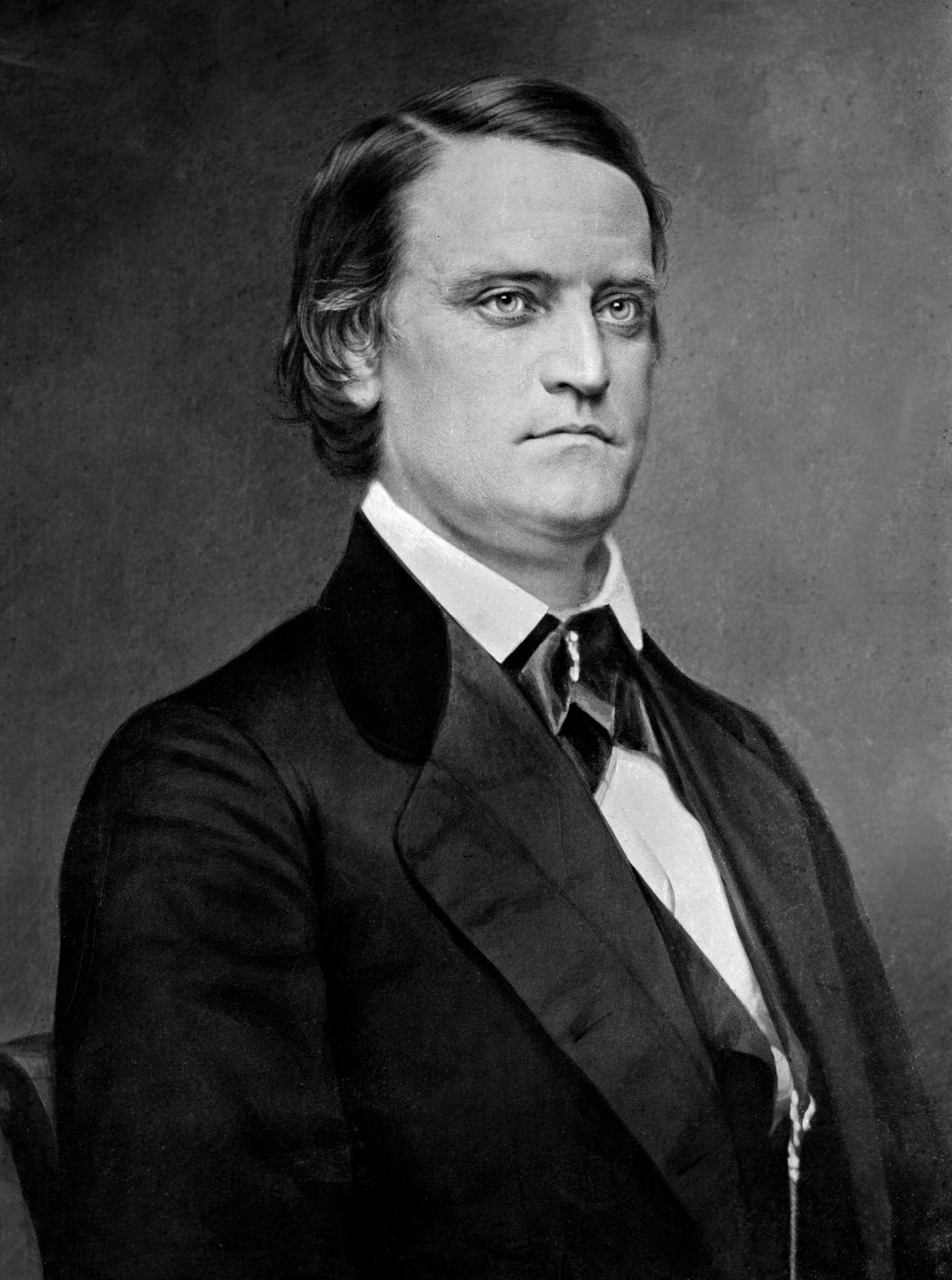
Vice President John C. Breckinridge

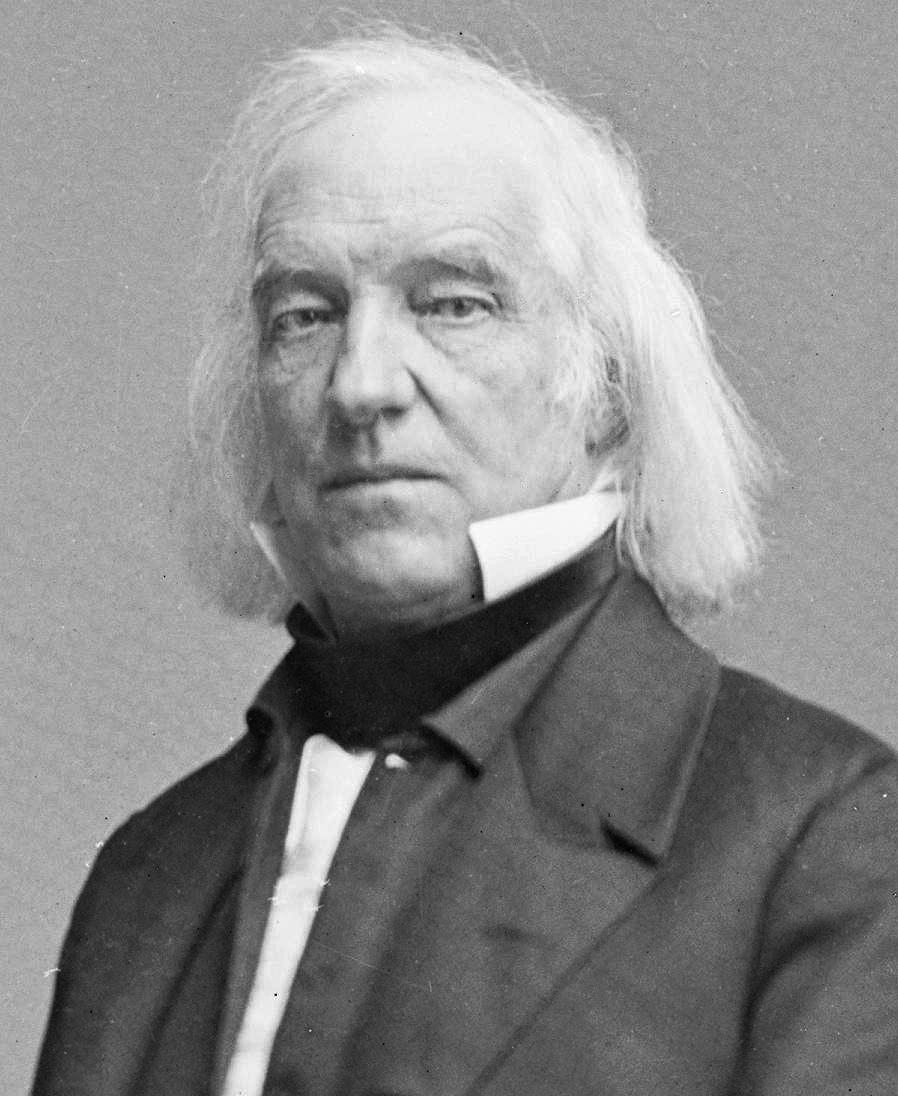
Former Senator
Daniel S. Dickinson from New York

Senator
Robert M. T. Hunter from Virginia
(declined to be nominated)

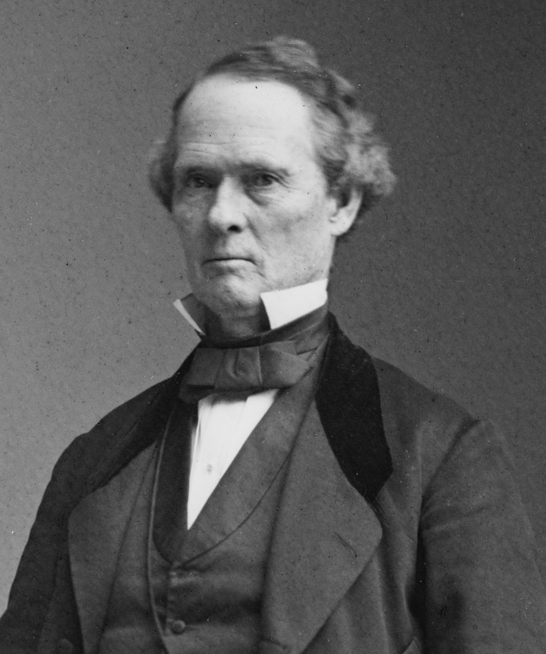
Senator Joseph Lane from Oregon
(declined to be nominated)

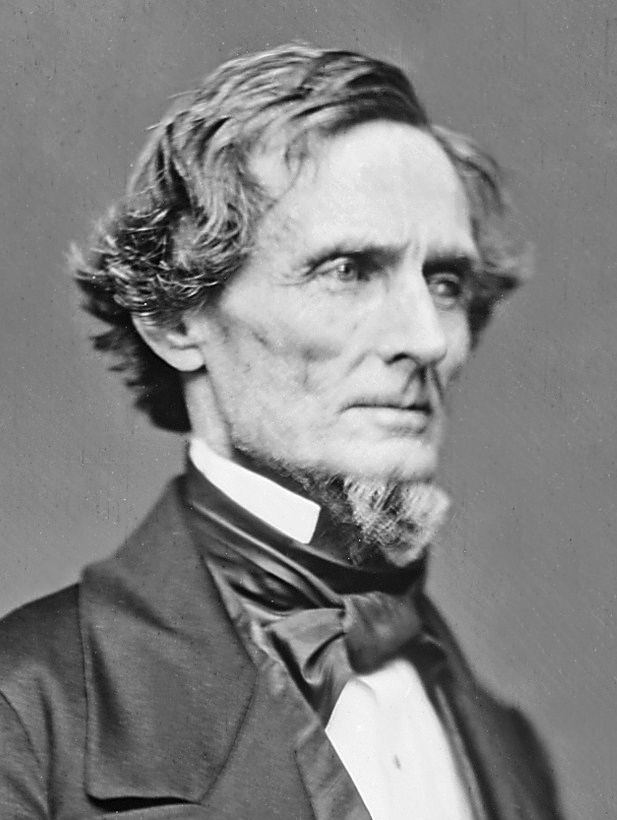
Senator Jefferson Davis from Mississippi
(declined to be nominated)

Maryland Institute Hall, Baltimore. The bolting delegates nominated Breckinridge before Richmond vote

The southern delegates walked out of Institute Hall on April 30, moving at first to the Saint Andrews Hall, then to Military Hall on May 1. On May 3, when the northern delegates left Charleston, the southern delegates left as well, reconvening at Metropolitan Hall in Richmond, Virginia on June 11. When the Democrats reconvened at Front Street Theater in Baltimore, they rejoined (except South Carolina and Florida, who had stayed in Richmond).

When the convention seated two replacement delegations on June 18, they walked out again or boycotted the convention, accompanied by nearly all other Southern delegates and erstwhile Convention chair Caleb Cushing, a New Englander and former member of Franklin Pierce's cabinet.

This larger group met immediately in Baltimore's Maryland Institute Hall, with Cushing again presiding. They adopted the pro-slavery platform rejected at Charleston, and nominated Vice President John C. Breckinridge for president, and Senator Joseph Lane from Oregon for vice president.

Yancey and some (less than half) of the bolters - almost entirely from the Lower South - met on June 28 at Metropolitan Hall in Richmond, along with the South Carolina and Florida delegations, at a convention that affirmed the nominations of Breckinridge and Lane.

Besides the Democratic parties in the Southern states, the Breckinridge/Lane ticket was also supported by the Buchanan administration. Buchanan's own continued prestige in his home state of Pennsylvania ensured that Breckinridge would be the principal Democratic candidate in that populous state. Breckinridge was the last sitting vice president nominated for president until Richard Nixon in 1960.

=== Constitutional Union Party nomination ===
1860 Constitutional Union Party ticket
John Bell	Edward Everett
for President	for Vice President
U.S. Senator from Tennessee (1847–1859)	U.S. Senator from Massachusetts (1853–1854)

Constitutional Union candidates:

- John Bell, former senator from Tennessee
- Sam Houston, governor of Texas
- John J. Crittenden, senator from Kentucky
- Edward Everett, former senator from Massachusetts
- William A. Graham, former senator from North Carolina
- William C. Rives, former senator from Virginia
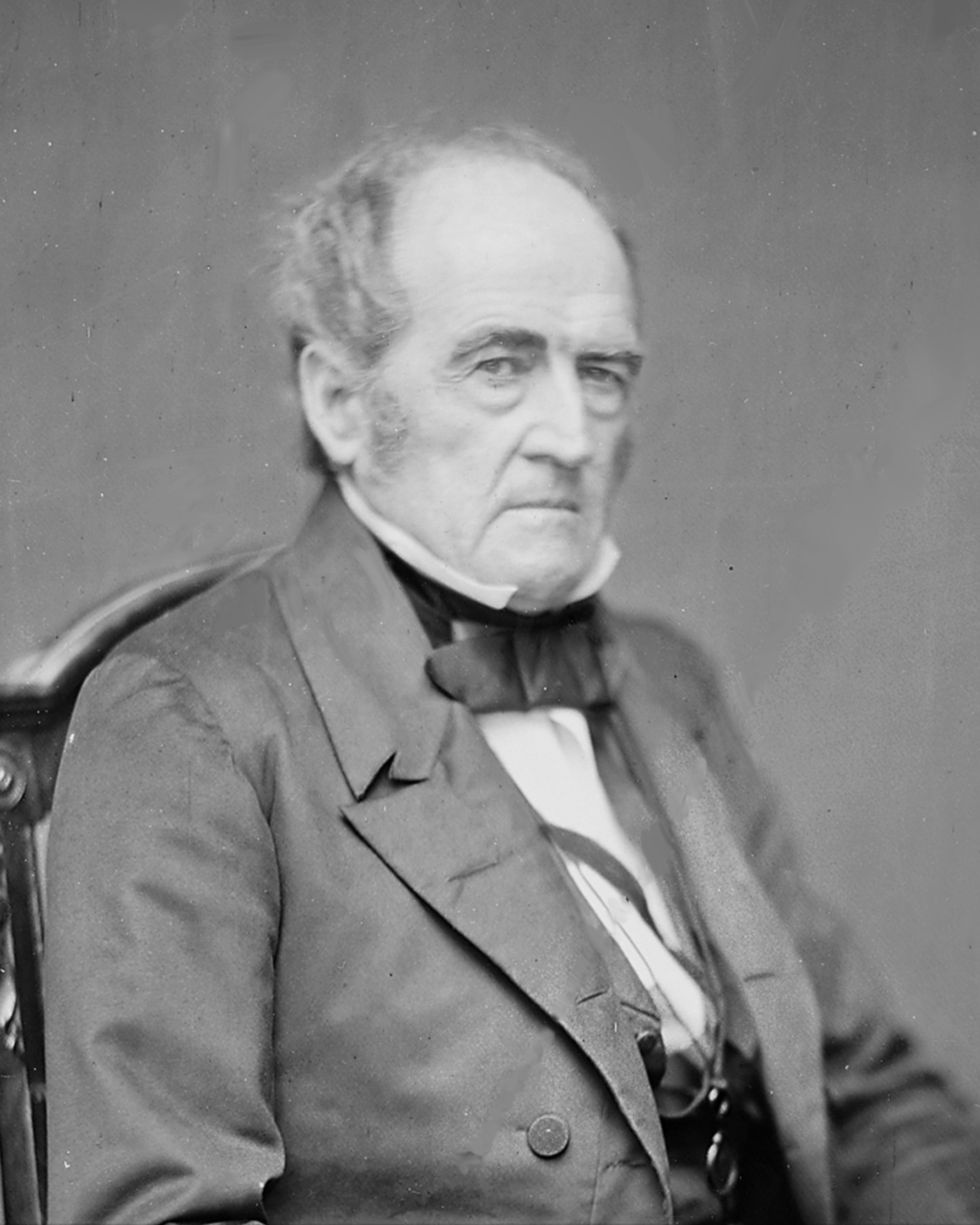
Former Senator John Bell of Tennessee

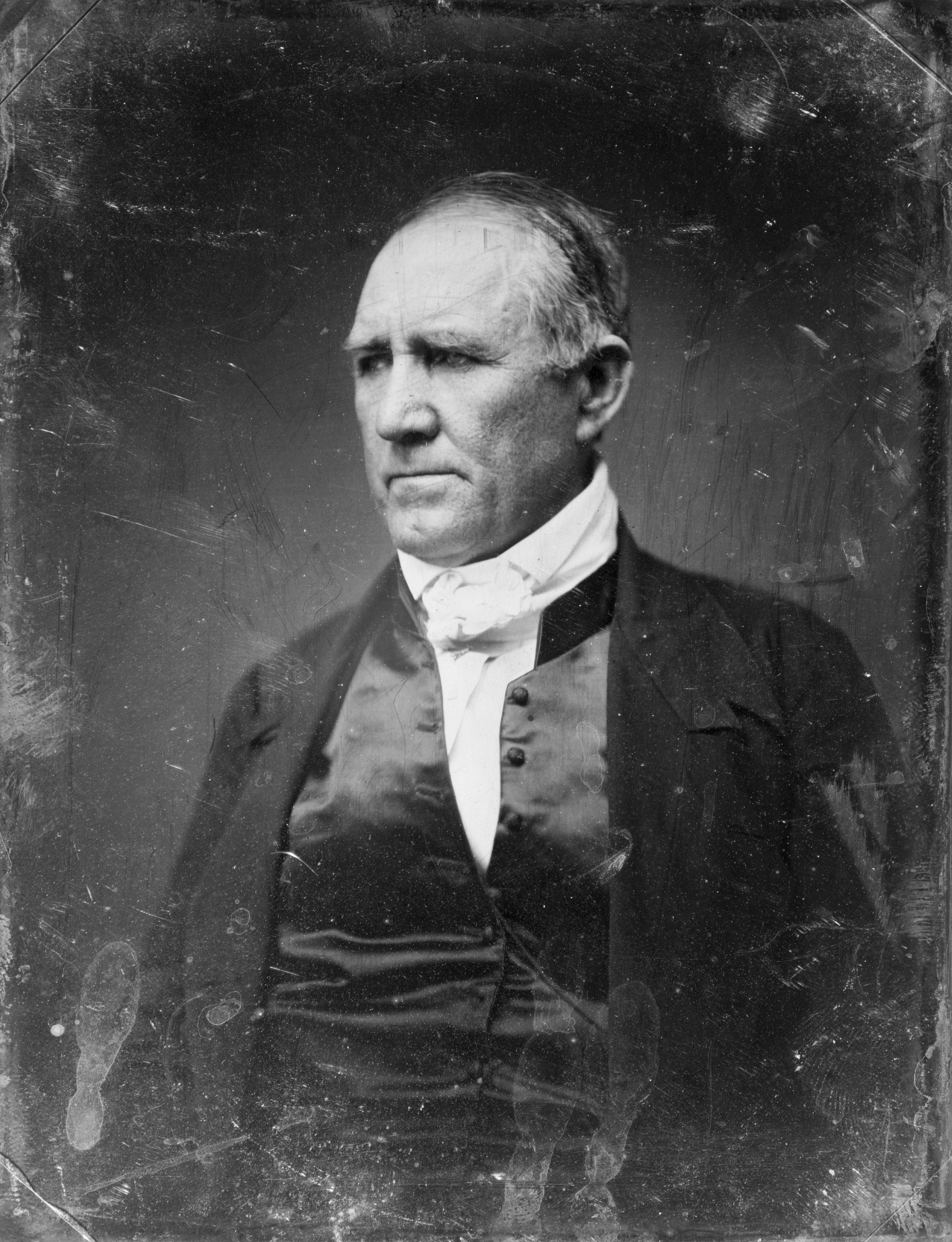
Governor Sam Houston of Texas

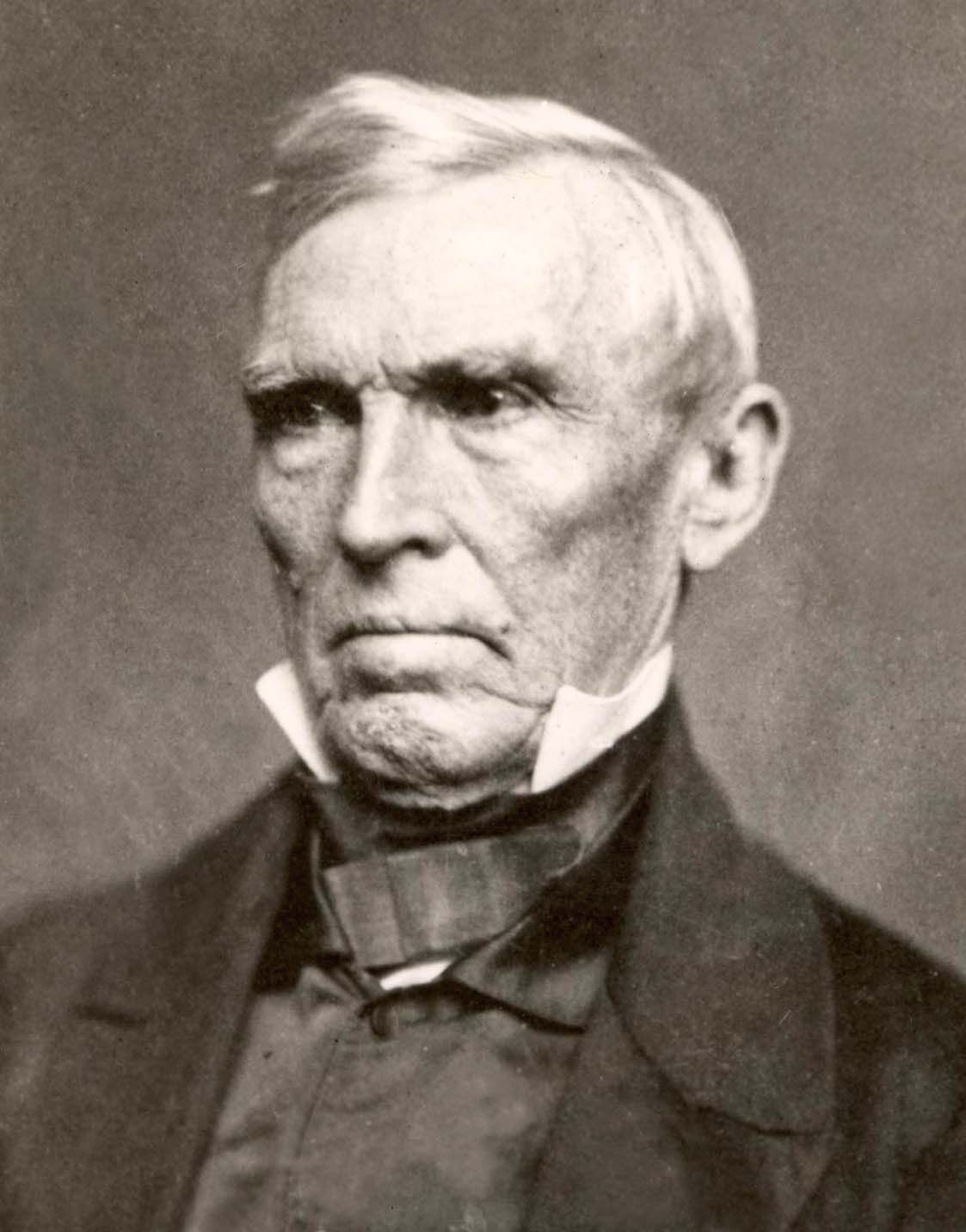
Senator John J. Crittenden from Kentucky

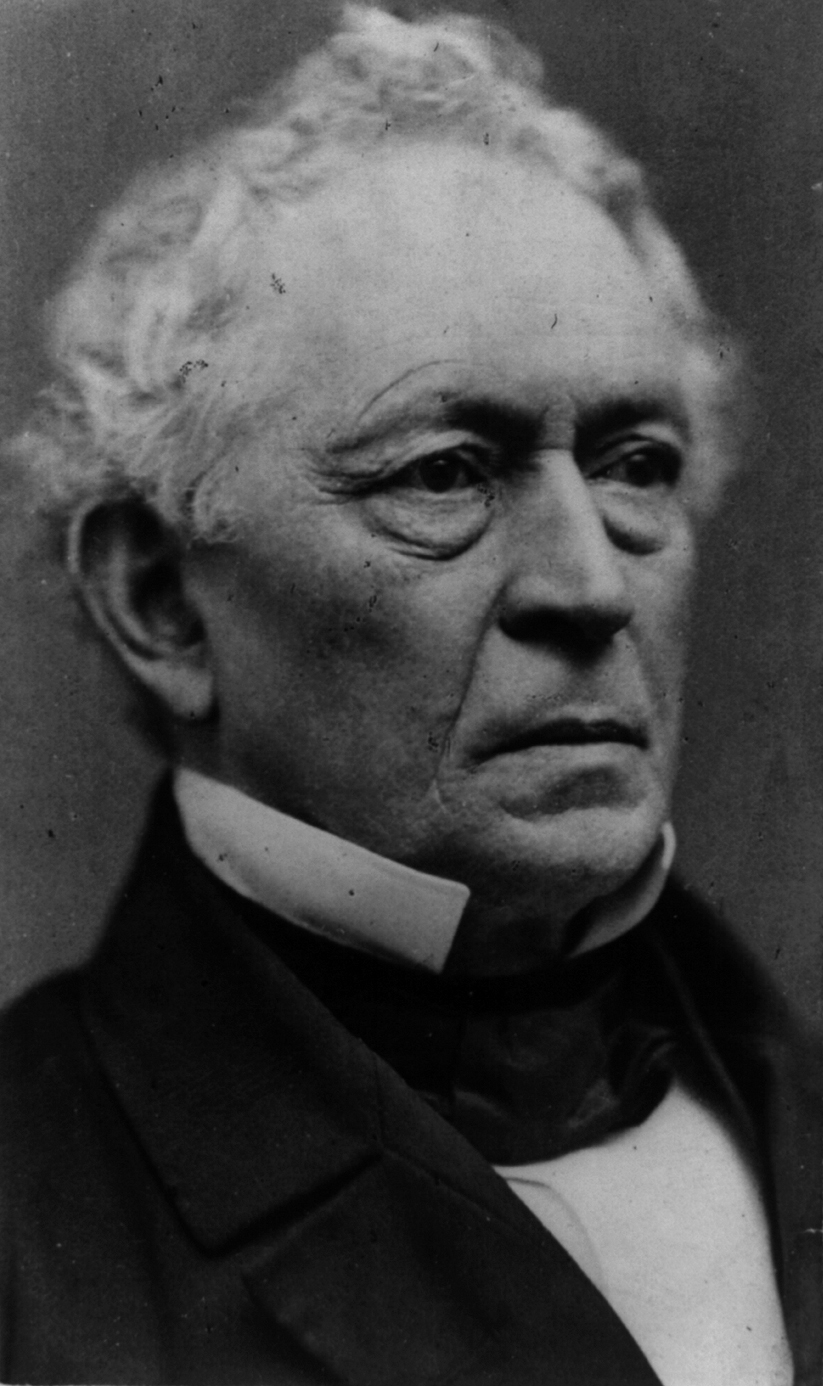
Former Senator Edward Everett from Massachusetts

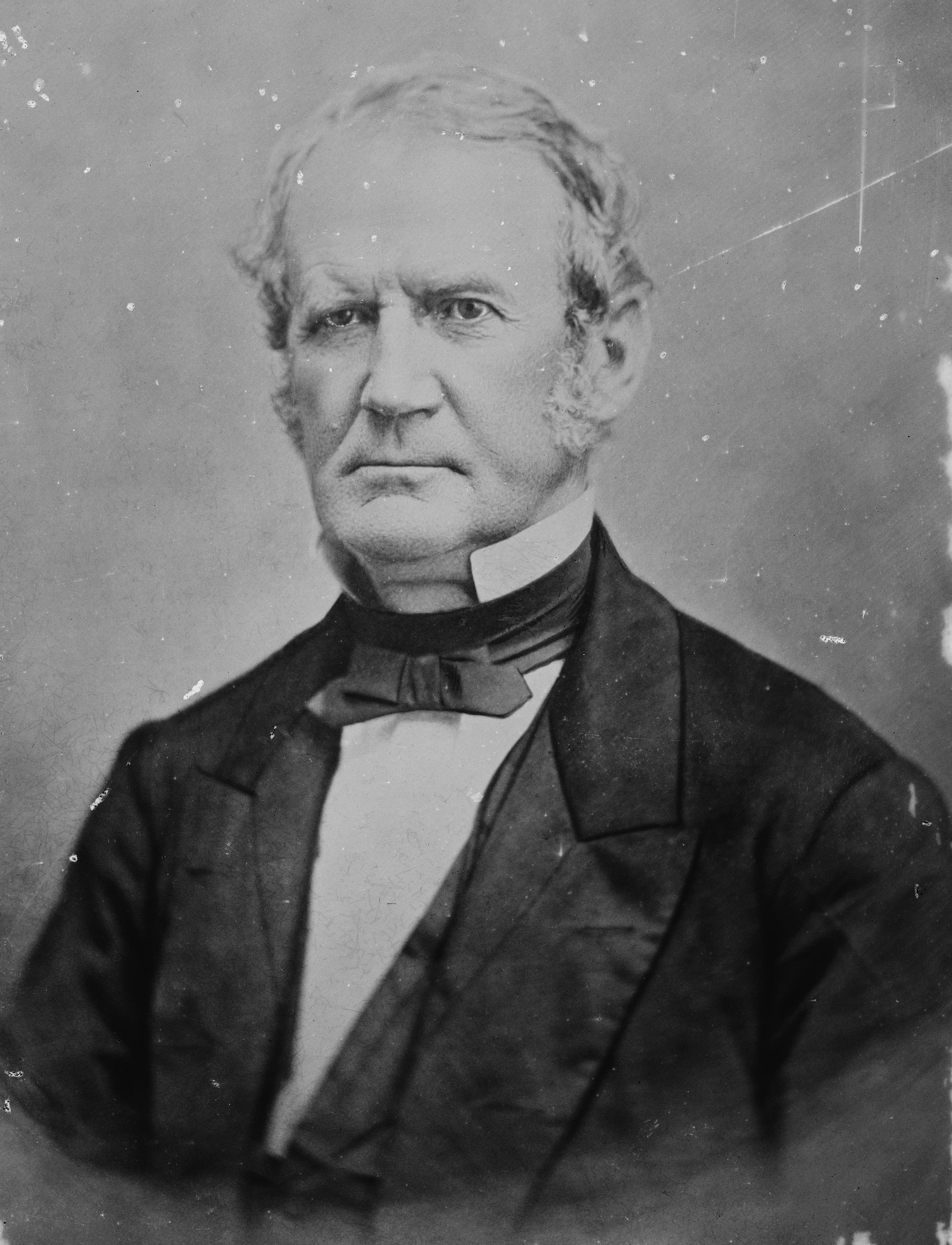
Former Senator William A. Graham from North Carolina

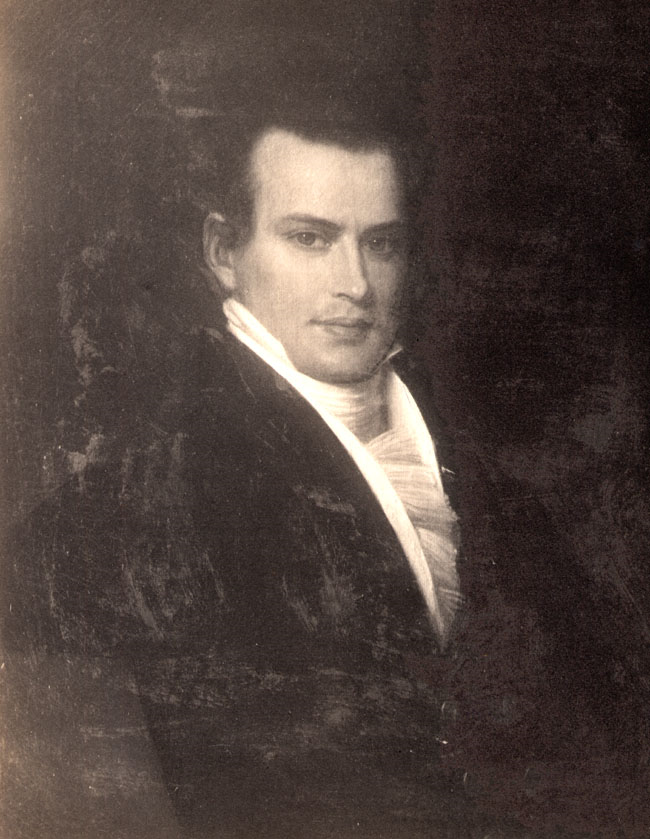
Former Senator William C. Rives from Virginia

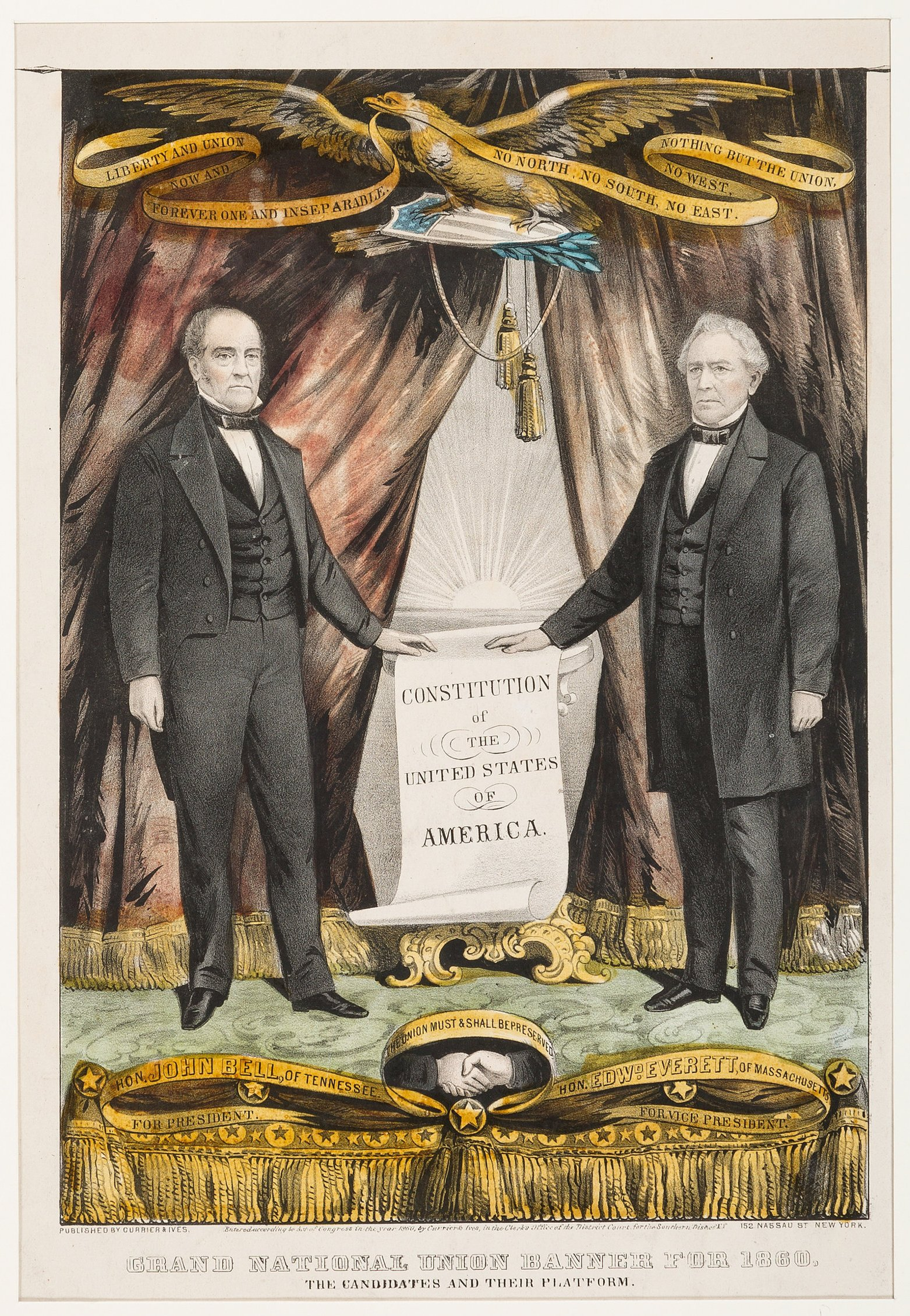
A Constitutional Union campaign poster, 1860, portraying John Bell and Edward Everett, respectively the candidates for president and vice president. Once Lincoln was inaugurated and called up the militia, Bell supported the secession of Tennessee. In 1863, Everett dedicated the new cemetery at Gettysburg.

The Constitutional Union Party was formed by remnants of both the defunct Know Nothing and Whig parties who were unwilling to join either the Republicans or the Democrats. The new party's members hoped to stave off Southern secession by avoiding the slavery issue. They met in the Eastside District Courthouse of Baltimore (Note: At the time the venue was The Old First Presbyterian Church (Two Towers Church) at the corner of Fayette and North Streets that had recently been purchased to become a federal courthouse.) and nominated John Bell from Tennessee for president over Governor Sam Houston of Texas on the second ballot. Edward Everett was nominated for vice president at the convention on May 9, 1860, one week before Lincoln.

John Bell was a former Whig who had opposed the Kansas–Nebraska Act and the Lecompton Constitution. Edward Everett had been president of Harvard University and Secretary of State in the Millard Fillmore administration. The party platform advocated compromise to save the Union with the slogan "The Union as it is, and the Constitution as it is."

=== Radical Abolitionist Party (aka Union Party) nomination ===
Radical Abolitionist candidates:

- Gerrit Smith, former representative from New York

==== Radical Abolitionist candidates gallery ====
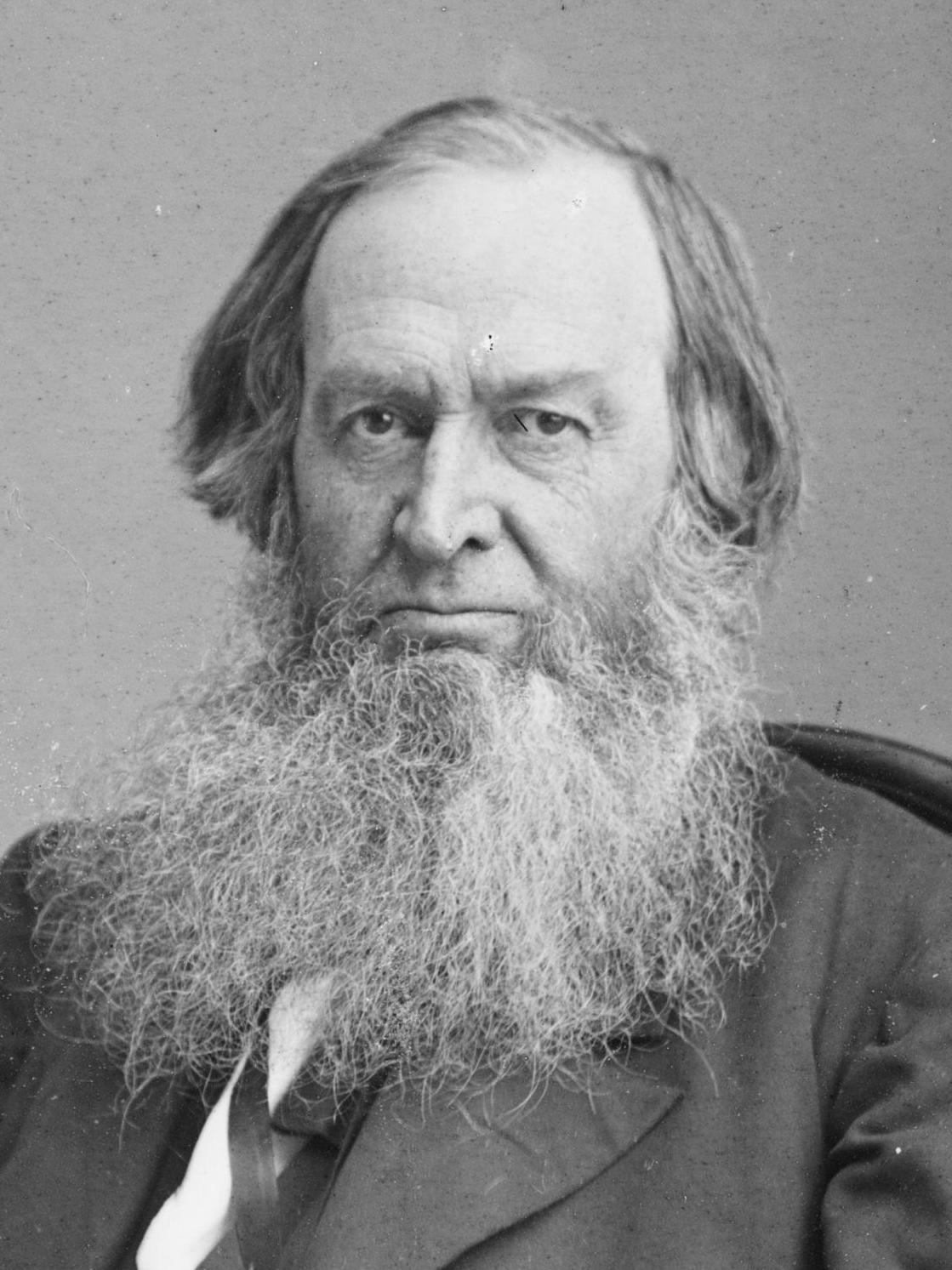
Former Representative Gerrit Smith from New York

The Radical Abolitionist Party was a remnant of the Liberty Party that formed after most former Liberty and Free Soil Party members joined the Republicans in the 1850s. A convention of one hundred delegates was held in Convention Hall, Syracuse, New York, on August 29, 1860. Delegates were in attendance from New York, Pennsylvania, New Jersey, Michigan, Illinois, Ohio, Kentucky, and Massachusetts. Several of the delegates were women.

Gerrit Smith, a prominent abolitionist and the 1848 presidential nominee of the original Liberty Party, had sent a letter in which he stated that his health had been so poor that he had not been able to be away from home since 1858. Nonetheless, he remained popular in the party because he had helped inspire some of John Brown's supporters at the Raid on Harpers Ferry. In his letter, Smith donated $50 to pay for the printing of ballots in the various states.

There was quite a spirited contest between the friends of Gerrit Smith and William Goodell in regard to the nomination for the presidency. In spite of his professed ill health, Gerrit Smith was nominated for president and Samuel McFarland from Pennsylvania was nominated for vice president.

In Ohio, Illinois, and Indiana, slates of presidential electors pledged to Smith and McFarland ran with the name of the Union Party. They received a total of 176 votes in the general election, 0.004% of the total.

=== People's Party nomination ===
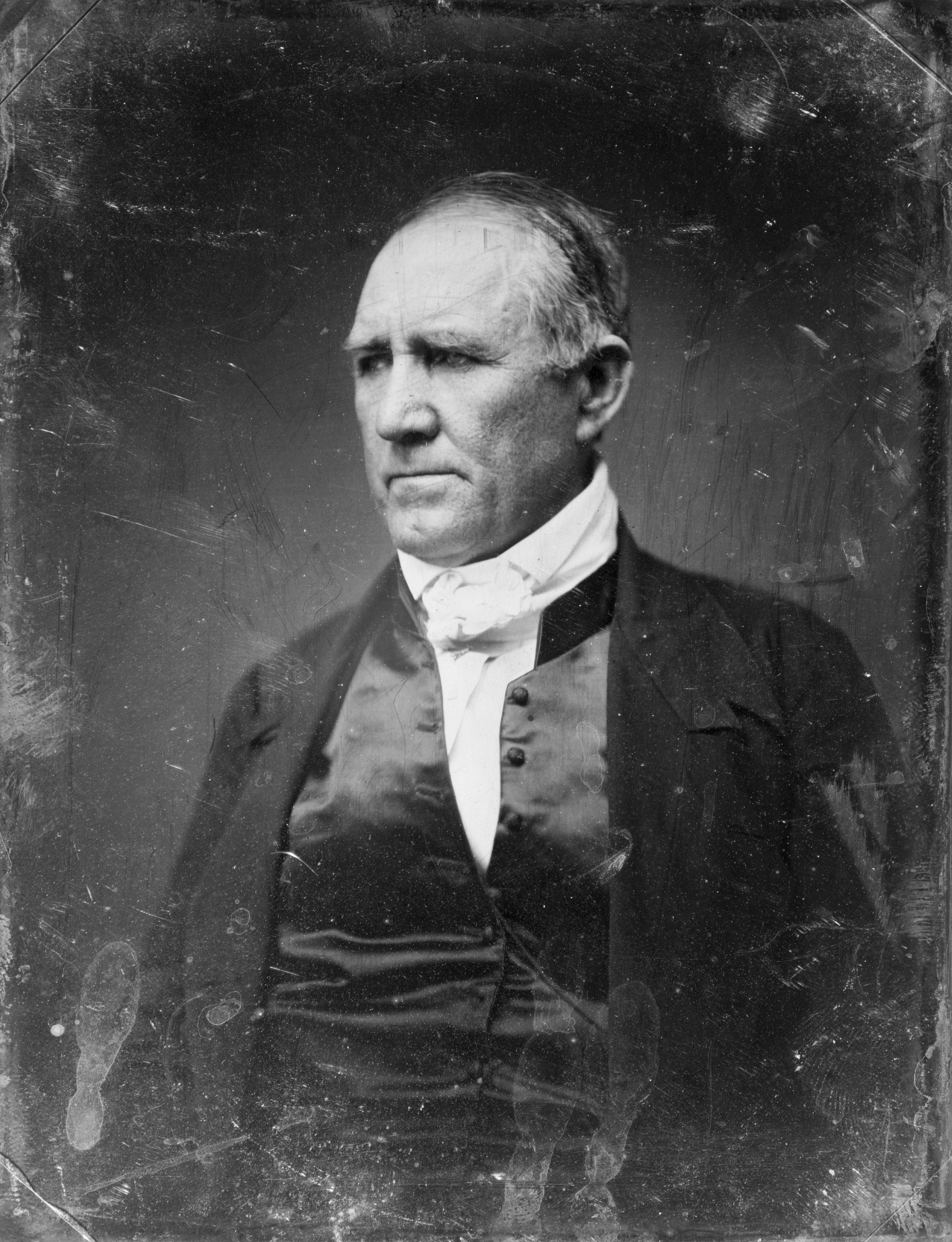
Governor Sam Houston of Texas

The People's Party was a loose association of the supporters of Governor Samuel Houston. On April 20, 1860, the party held what it termed a national convention to nominate Houston for president on the San Jacinto Battlefield in Texas. Houston's supporters at the gathering did not nominate a vice presidential candidate, since they expected later gatherings to carry out that function. Later mass meetings were held in northern cities, such as New York City on May 30, 1860, but they too failed to nominate a vice presidential candidate. Houston, never enthusiastic about running for the presidency, soon became convinced that he had no chance of winning and that his candidacy would only make it easier for the Republican candidate to win. He withdrew from the race on August 16, and urged the formation of a Unified "Union" ticket in opposition to Lincoln.

== Political considerations ==
In their campaigning, Bell and Douglas both claimed that disunion would not necessarily follow a Lincoln election. Nonetheless, loyal army officers in Virginia, Kansas and South Carolina warned Lincoln of military preparations to the contrary. Secessionists threw their support behind Breckinridge in an attempt either to force the anti-Republican candidates to coordinate their electoral votes or throw the election into the House of Representatives, where the selection of the president would be made by the representatives elected in 1858, before the Republican majorities in both House and Senate achieved in 1860 were seated in the new 37th Congress. Mexican War hero Winfield Scott suggested to Lincoln that he assume the powers of a commander-in-chief before inauguration. However, historian Bruce Chadwick observes that Lincoln and his advisors ignored the widespread alarms and threats of secession as mere election trickery.

Indeed, voting in the South was not as monolithic as the Electoral College map would make it seem. Economically, culturally, and politically, the South was made up of three regions. In the states of the Upper South, also known as the Border South (Delaware, Maryland, Kentucky, and Missouri), unionist popular votes were scattered among Lincoln, Douglas, and Bell, to form a majority in all four. In the four Middle South states, there was a unionist majority divided between Douglas and Bell in Virginia and Tennessee; in North Carolina and Arkansas, the unionist (Bell and Douglas) vote approached a majority. In three of the seven Deep South states, unionists (Bell and Douglas) won divided majorities in Georgia and Louisiana and neared it in Alabama. Breckinridge convincingly carried only four of the seven states of the Deep South (South Carolina, Florida, Mississippi, and Texas). The Deep South states had the largest enslaved populations, and consequently the smallest enfranchised free white populations.

Among the slave states, the three states with the highest voter turnouts voted the most one-sided. Texas, with five percent of the total wartime South's population, voted 75 percent Breckinridge. Kentucky and Missouri, with one-fourth of the total population, voted 73 percent pro-Union Bell, Douglas and Lincoln. In comparison, the other six states of the Deep South made up one-fourth of the Confederate voting population; this was split 57 percent for Breckinridge versus 43 percent for the two pro-union candidates. (Note: "Deep South" here in presidential popular votes refers to Georgia, Florida, Alabama, Mississippi and Louisiana. It excludes South Carolina from the calculation, because in 1860 it chose presidential electors in the state legislature, without a popular vote.) The four states that were admitted to the Confederacy after Fort Sumter held almost half its population, and voted a narrow combined majority of 53 percent for the pro-union candidates.

In the eleven states that would later declare their secession from the Union and be controlled by Confederate armies, ballots for Lincoln were cast only in Virginia, (Note: Ballots were printed sheets, usually printed by the party, with the name of the candidate(s) and the names of presidential electors who were pledged to that presidential candidate. Voters brought the ballot to the polling station and dropped it publicly into the election box. In order to receive any votes, a candidate (or his party) had to have ballots printed and organize a group of electors pledged to that candidate. Except in some border areas, the Republican party did not attempt any organization in the South and did not print ballots there because almost no one was willing to acknowledge publicly they were voting for Lincoln for fear of violent retribution.) where he received 1,929 votes (1.15 percent of the total). The vast majority of the votes Lincoln received were cast in border counties of what would soon become West Virginia – the future state accounted for 1,832 of Lincoln's 1,929 votes. Lincoln received no votes at all in 121 of the state's at-the-time 145 counties (including 31 of the 50 that would form West Virginia), received a single vote in three counties and received ten or fewer votes in nine of the 24 counties where he polled votes. Lincoln's best results, by far, were in the four counties that composed the state's northern panhandle, a region which had long felt alienated from Richmond, was economically and culturally linked to its neighbors Ohio and Pennsylvania and would become the key driver in the successful effort to form a separate state. Hancock County (Virginia's northernmost at the time) returned Lincoln's best result – he polled over 40% of the vote there and finished in second place (Lincoln polled only eight votes fewer than Breckinridge). Of the 97 votes cast for Lincoln in the state's post-1863 boundaries, 93 were polled in four counties along the Potomac River and four were tallied in the coastal city of Portsmouth.

Although Lincoln received no votes in 10 Southern states, this was not because he was removed from the ballot in those states, but rather due to the Republican Party's absence in those states (parties rather than states printed ballots in that era).

One key difference between modern elections and those of the mid-nineteenth century is that at the time the state did not print and distribute ballots. In theory, any document containing a valid or at least non-excessive number names of citizens of a particular state (provided they were eligible to vote in the electoral college within that state) might have been accepted as a valid presidential ballot; however, what this meant in practice was that a candidate's campaign was responsible for printing and distributing their own ballots (this service was typically done by supportive newspaper publishers). Moreover, since voters did not choose the president directly, but rather presidential electors, the only way for a voter to meaningfully support a particular candidate for president was cast a ballot for citizens of his state who would have pledged to vote for the candidate in the Electoral College. In ten southern slave states, no citizen would publicly pledge to vote for Abraham Lincoln, so citizens there had no legal means to vote for the Republican nominee. In most of Virginia, no publisher would print ballots for Lincoln's pledged electors. While a citizen without access to a ballot for Lincoln could theoretically have still voted for him by means of a write-in ballot provided his state had electors pledged to Lincoln and the voter knew their identities, casting a ballot in favor of the Republican candidate in a strongly pro-slavery county would have incurred (at minimum) social ostracization (of course, casting a vote for Breckinridge in a strongly abolitionist county ran a voter the same risk).

Of the four slave states that did not secede Lincoln came third in Delaware and fourth in Missouri, Kentucky and Maryland. Within the fifteen slave states, Lincoln won only two counties out of 996, Missouri's St. Louis and Gasconade counties. In the 1856 election, the Republican candidate for president had received no votes at all in twelve of the fourteen slave states with a popular vote (these being the same states as in the 1860 election, plus Missouri and Virginia).

== Results ==
Inauguration of Abraham Lincoln
the Capitol, March 4, 1861

State election results
by Electoral College vote

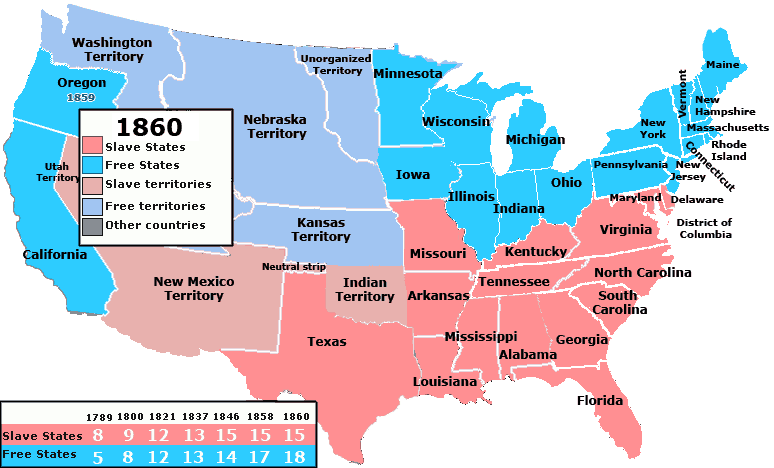
Presence of slavery
during the election

The election was held on Tuesday, November 6, 1860, and was noteworthy for the exaggerated sectionalism and voter enthusiasm in a country that was soon to dissolve into civil war. Voter turnout was 81.2%, the highest in American history up to that time, and the second-highest overall (exceeded only in the election of 1876). 31.5% of the voting age population voted.

Since Andrew Jackson had won re-election in 1832, all six subsequent presidents had only won one term, while the last four of those had won with a popular vote under 51 percent.

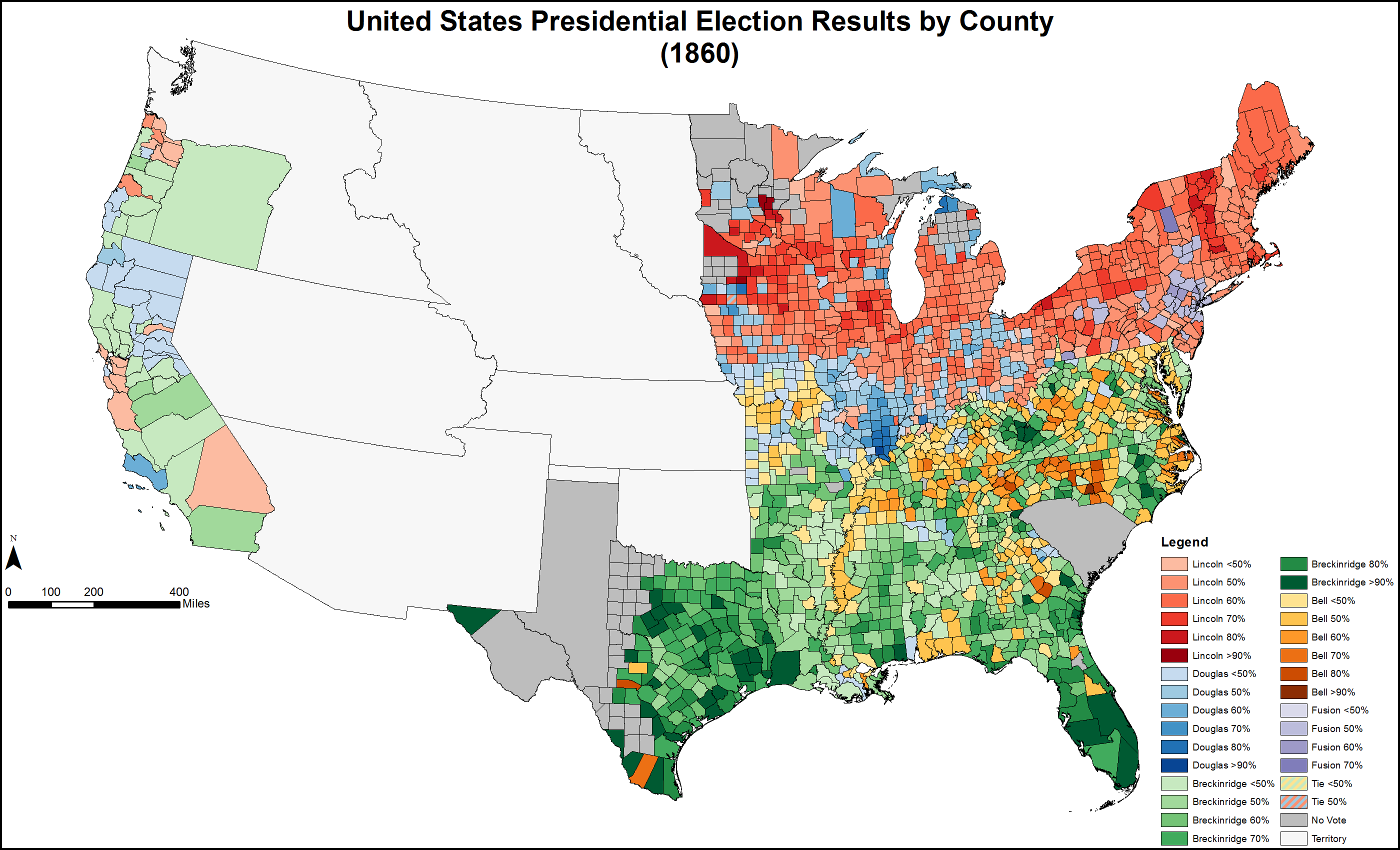
Results by county, with darker shades indicating larger percentages for the winning candidate. Red is for Lincoln (Republican), blue is for Douglas (Northern Democratic), green is for Breckinridge (Southern Democratic), yellow is for Bell (Constitutional Union), and purple is for "Fusion" (Non-Republican/Democratic Fusion). South Carolina had no popular vote.

Lincoln won the Electoral College with less than 40 percent of the popular vote nationwide by carrying states above the Mason–Dixon line and north of the Ohio River, plus the states of California and Oregon in the Far West. Unlike every preceding president-elect, Lincoln did not carry even one slave state; he instead carried all eighteen free states exclusively.

Lincoln received no votes in ten Southern states because the Republican Party was absent in those states (parties rather than states printed ballots in that era). There were no ballots distributed for Lincoln in ten of the Southern states: Alabama, Arkansas, Florida, Georgia, Louisiana, Mississippi, North Carolina, South Carolina, Tennessee, and Texas. This withheld 61 potential electoral votes from Lincoln, a fifth of what was the total 303 available to the other candidates. In a similar divide between North and South electors, Breckenridge carried nine of the ten states that withheld Lincoln from the ballot, the exception being Tennessee.

Lincoln was, therefore, the second President-elect to poll no votes in some states that had a popular vote (the first was John Quincy Adams, who polled no ballots in the popular votes of two states in the election of 1824, the only other election in which there were four major candidates, none of whom distributed ballots in every state). It should be further noted that, prior to the introduction of the secret ballot in the 1880s, the concept of ballot access did not exist in the sense it does today: there was no standardized state-issued ballot for a candidate to "appear" on. Instead, presidential ballots were printed and distributed by agents of the candidates and their parties, who organized slates of would-be electors publicly pledged to vote for a particular candidate. The 1824 and 1860 presidential elections were the only two prior to the introduction of the secret ballot where a winning candidate was so unpopular in a particular region that it was impossible to organize and print ballots for a slate of eligible voters pledged to vote for that candidate in an entire state.

Since 1860, and excluding unreconstructed Southern states in 1868 and 1872, there have been two occasions where a Republican presidential candidate failed to poll votes in every state, (Note: In 1892, incumbent President Benjamin Harrison failed to poll votes in Florida because the state's Republicans supported Populist nominee James B. Weaver. In 1912, William Howard Taft was not on the ballot in South Dakota or California because the South Dakotan and Californian branches of the Republican Party nominated Progressive candidate Theodore Roosevelt as the official Republican candidate.) while national Democratic candidates have failed to appear on all state ballots in three elections since the introduction of the secret ballot, though in all three, the Democratic candidate nonetheless won the presidency, (Note: In 1892, Grover Cleveland was not on the ballot in Colorado, Idaho, Kansas, North Dakota, or Wyoming, while neither Harry Truman in 1948 nor Lyndon Johnson in 1964 were on the ballot in Alabama.) but none of them were off the ballot in as many states as Lincoln in 1860.

Lincoln won the second-lowest share of the popular vote among all winning presidential candidates in U.S. history. (Note: John Quincy Adams, who won the 1824 presidential election in a vote of the House of Representatives, won 30.92% of the popular vote, or 10.44% less than that of Andrew Jackson. Lincoln's share of the popular vote in 1860 represents the lowest share received by any popular vote winner.) Lincoln's share of the popular vote would likely have been even lower if there had been a popular vote in South Carolina, though conversely it would likely have been marginally higher had Republican ballots been widely available to voters throughout the Southern States. The Republican victory resulted from the concentration of votes in the free states, which together controlled a majority of the presidential electors.

Lincoln's strategy was deliberately focused, in collaboration with Republican Party Chairman Thurlow Weed, on expanding on the states Frémont won four years earlier: New York was critical with 35 Electoral College votes, 11.5 percent of the total, and with Pennsylvania (27) and Ohio (23) as well, a candidate could collect 85 votes, whereas 152 were required to win. The Wide Awakes young Republican men's organization massively expanded registered voter lists, and population increases in the free states had far exceeded those seen in the slave states for many years before the election of 1860, hence free states dominated in the Electoral College. Gasconade County, Missouri has voted for a Republican presidential candidate in every election from 1860 on, which, as of 2024, makes it the longest Republican winning streak in presidential elections in the nation.

Despite Lincoln's commanding victory, this was the first election in American history in which the winner failed to win a majority of votes in his home county, with Lincoln narrowly losing Sangamon County, Illinois to Douglas, his main opponent in the North.

The split in the Democratic party is often named as the main cause for Lincoln's victory though this is untrue; Lincoln received less than 40% of the national popular vote, though much of the anti-Republican vote was "wasted" in Southern states where a lack of Republican-ticket ballots meant Lincoln was not offered as an option to voters. Regardless, Lincoln won absolute majorities (>50%) in enough states, that if he lost all states that he took with pluralities, he still would have received enough electoral votes to win. Had all the Democratic Party voters voted for the same candidate, Lincoln would have only been deprived of California, Oregon, and four New Jersey electors, whose combined total of eleven electoral votes would not have swayed the national outcome; Lincoln would have received 169 electoral votes, 17 more than the 152 required to win. In short, even if Ranked-Choice Voting, or any other runoff system had been in effect in every state, Lincoln still would have won on the first round.

In New York, Pennsylvania, and New Jersey, where anti-Lincoln votes were combined into fusion tickets, Lincoln still won New York and Pennsylvania and split New Jersey. Nevertheless, a shift of 25,000 votes to the fusion ticket in New York would have left Lincoln with 145 electoral votes — seven votes short of winning the Electoral College — and forced a contingent election in the House of Representatives. Alternatively, a shift of only 15,400 votes over California, Illinois, Minnesota, New Jersey, Oregon, and Rhode Island would have left Lincoln short of the necessary 152 electoral votes. Of the five states that Lincoln failed to carry, he received 20 percent of the vote in only one (Delaware) and 10 percent of the vote in one more (Missouri).

Like Lincoln, Breckinridge and Bell won no electoral votes outside of their respective sections. While Bell retired to his family business, quietly supporting his state's secession, Breckinridge served as a Confederate general. He finished second in the Electoral College with 72 votes, carrying eleven of fifteen slave states (including South Carolina, whose electors were chosen by the state legislature, not popular vote). Breckinridge stood a distant third in national popular vote at eighteen percent, but accrued 50 to 75 percent in the first seven states that would form the Confederate States of America. He took nine of the eleven states that eventually joined, plus the border slave states of Delaware and Maryland, losing only Virginia and Tennessee. Breckinridge received very little support in the free states, showing some strength only in California, Oregon, Pennsylvania, and Connecticut.

Bell carried three slave states (Tennessee, Kentucky, and Virginia) and lost Maryland by only 722 votes. Nevertheless, he finished a remarkable second in all slave states won by Breckinridge or Douglas. He won 45 to 47 percent in Maryland, Tennessee, and North Carolina and canvassed respectably with 36 to 40 percent in Missouri, Arkansas, Louisiana, Georgia, and Florida. Bell himself had hoped that he would take over the former support of the extinct Whig Party in free states, but the majority of this support went to Lincoln. Thus, except for running mate Everett's home state of Massachusetts, and California, Bell received even less support in the free states than did Breckinridge, and consequently came in last in the national popular vote, at 12.62%.

Douglas was the only candidate who won electoral votes in both slave and free states (free New Jersey and slave Missouri). His support was the most widespread geographically; he finished second behind Lincoln in the popular vote with 29.52%, but last in the Electoral College. His 12 electoral votes are the lowest for a Democrat in history. Douglas attained a 28 to 47% share in the states of the Mid-Atlantic, Midwest, and Trans-Mississippi West, but slipped to 19 to 39% in New England. Outside his regional section, Douglas took 15 to 17% of the popular vote total in the slave states of Kentucky, Alabama, and Louisiana, then 10 percent or less in the nine remaining slave states. Douglas, in his "Norfolk Doctrine", reiterated in North Carolina, promised to keep the Union together by coercion if states proceeded to secede: the popular vote for Lincoln and Douglas combined was 69.17% of the turnout.

The 1860 Republican ticket was the first successful national ticket that did not feature a Southerner, and the election marked the end of Southern political dominance in the United States. Between 1789 and 1860, Southerners had been president for two-thirds of the era, and had held the offices of Speaker of the House and President pro tempore of the Senate during much of that time. Moreover, since 1791, Southerners had constituted a majority of the Supreme Court.

Electoral results
Presidential candidate	Party	Home state	Popular vote		Electoral vote	Running mate		
Presidential candidate	Party	Home state	Count	Percentage	Electoral vote	Vice-presidential candidate	Home state	Electoral vote
Abraham Lincoln	Republican	Illinois	1,855,276	39.67%	180	Hannibal Hamlin	Maine	180
John C. Breckinridge	Southern Democratic	Kentucky	672,601	14.38%	72	Joseph Lane	Oregon	72
John Bell	Constitutional Union	Tennessee	590,980	12.64%	39	Edward Everett	Massachusetts	39
Stephen A. Douglas	Northern Democratic	Illinois	1,004,042	21.47%	12	Herschel V. Johnson	Georgia	12
Fusion	Various	—	553,570	11.84%	—	Fusion	—	—
Gerrit Smith	Radical Abolitionist	New York	176	0.004%	—	Samuel McFarland	Pennsylvania	—
Total			4,676,645	100%	303			303
Needed to win					152			152

Source (Electoral Vote): "Electoral College Box Scores 1789–1996". National Archives and Records Administration.

^{(a)} The popular vote figures exclude South Carolina where the Electors were chosen by the state legislature rather than by popular vote.

Popular vote
Lincoln	^{(b)} 39.67%
Douglas	21.47%
Breckinridge	14.38%
Bell	12.64%
Fusion	11.84%
Smith	0.004%

Electoral vote
Lincoln	^{(b)} 59.41%
Breckinridge	23.76%
Bell	12.87%
Douglas	3.96%

^{(b)} The option of Lincoln was absent from 20.13% of ballots across ten states. He was available to only 79.87% of the voters that were available to the other candidates.

=== Geography of results ===
==== Cartographic gallery ====
Vector Map of presidential election results by county

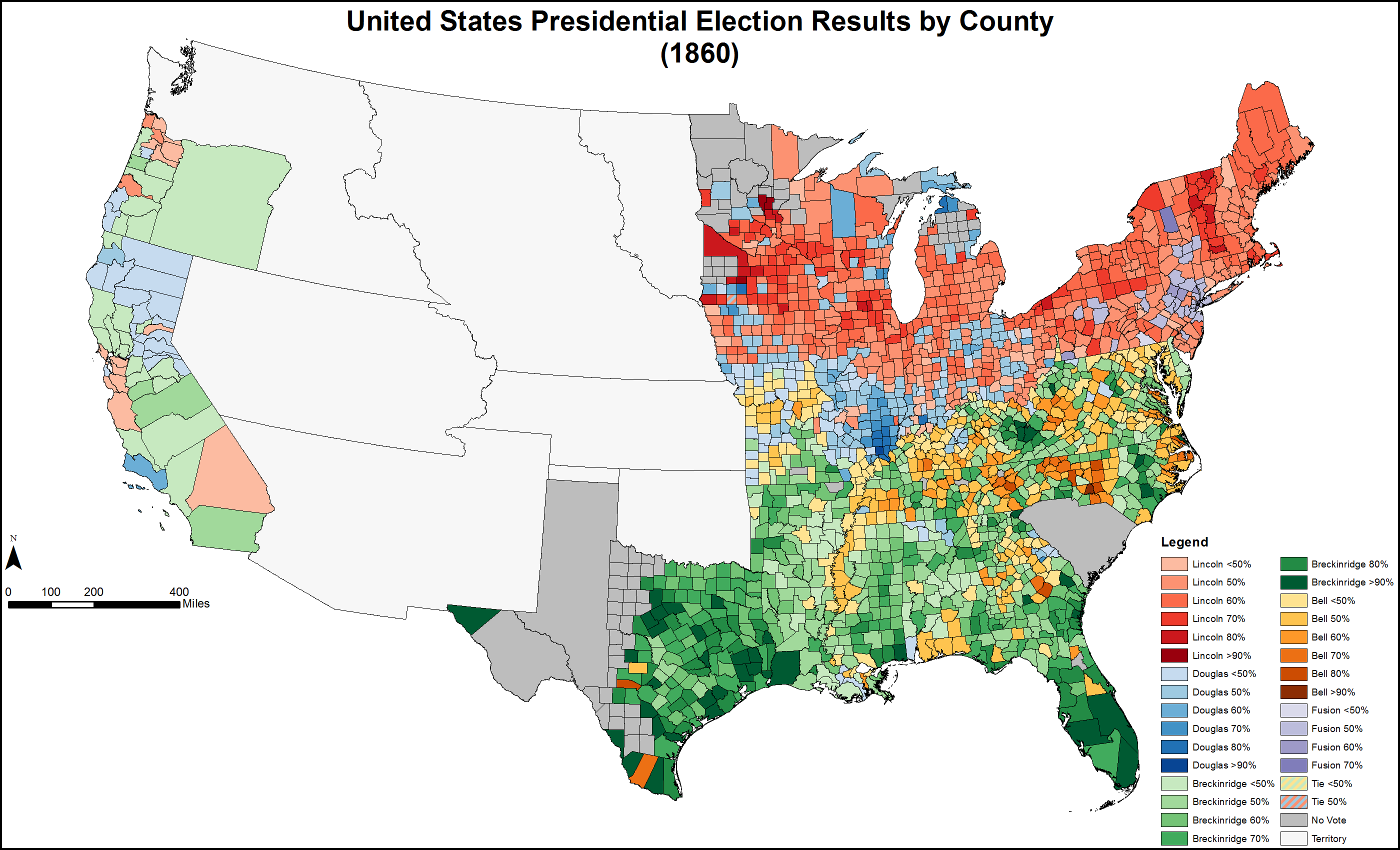
Map of presidential election results by county

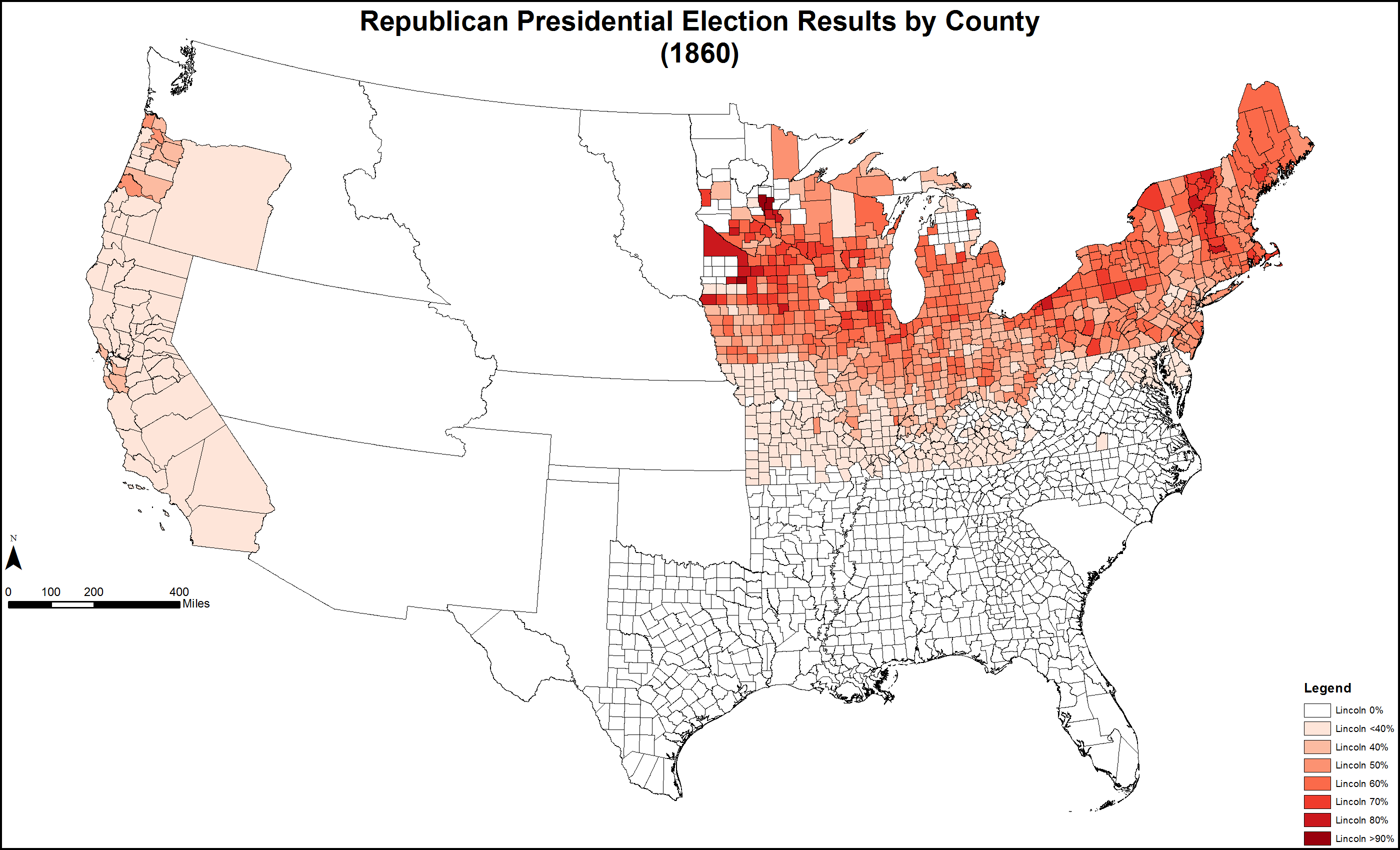
Map of Republican presidential election results by county

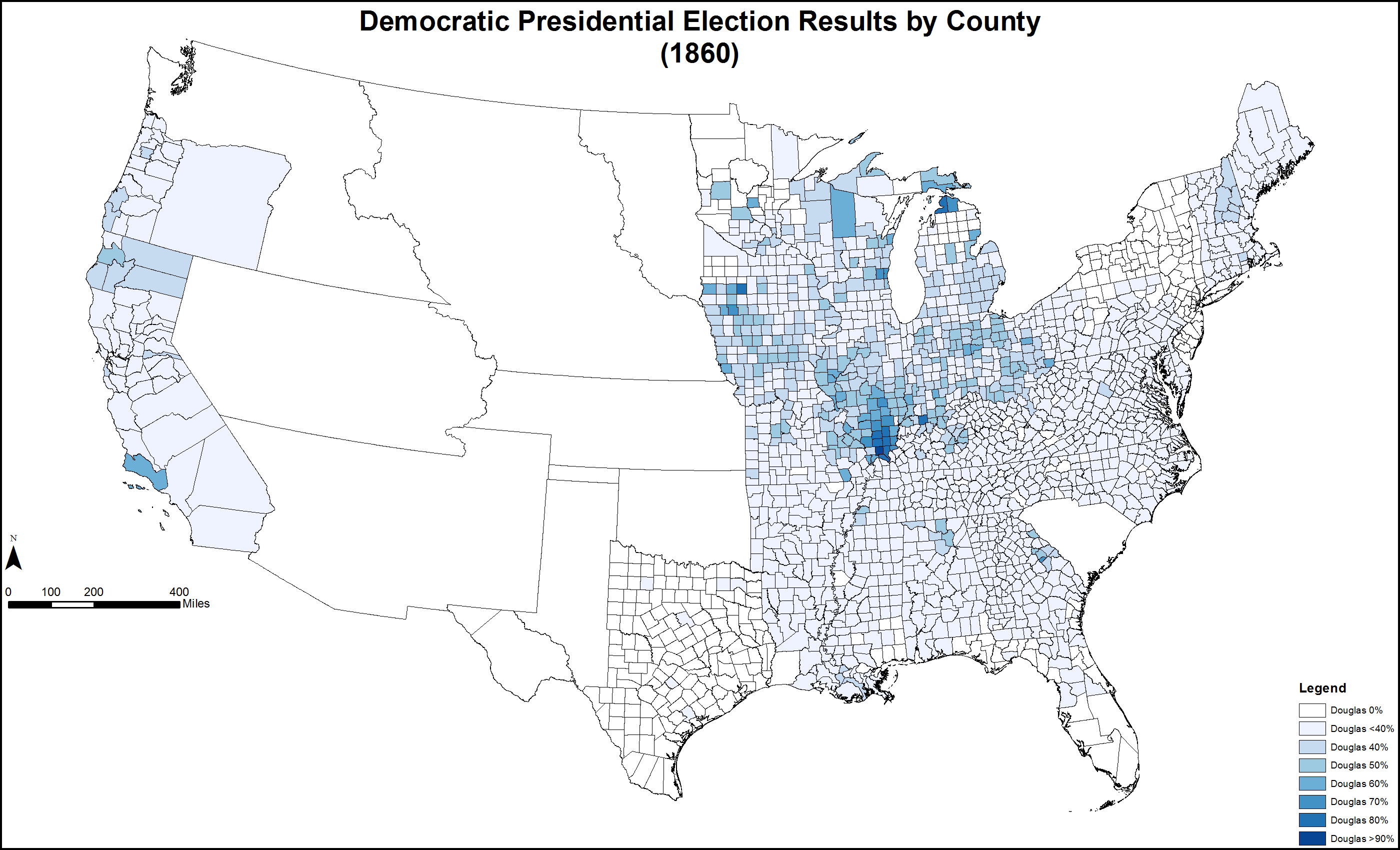
Map of Northern Democratic presidential election results by county

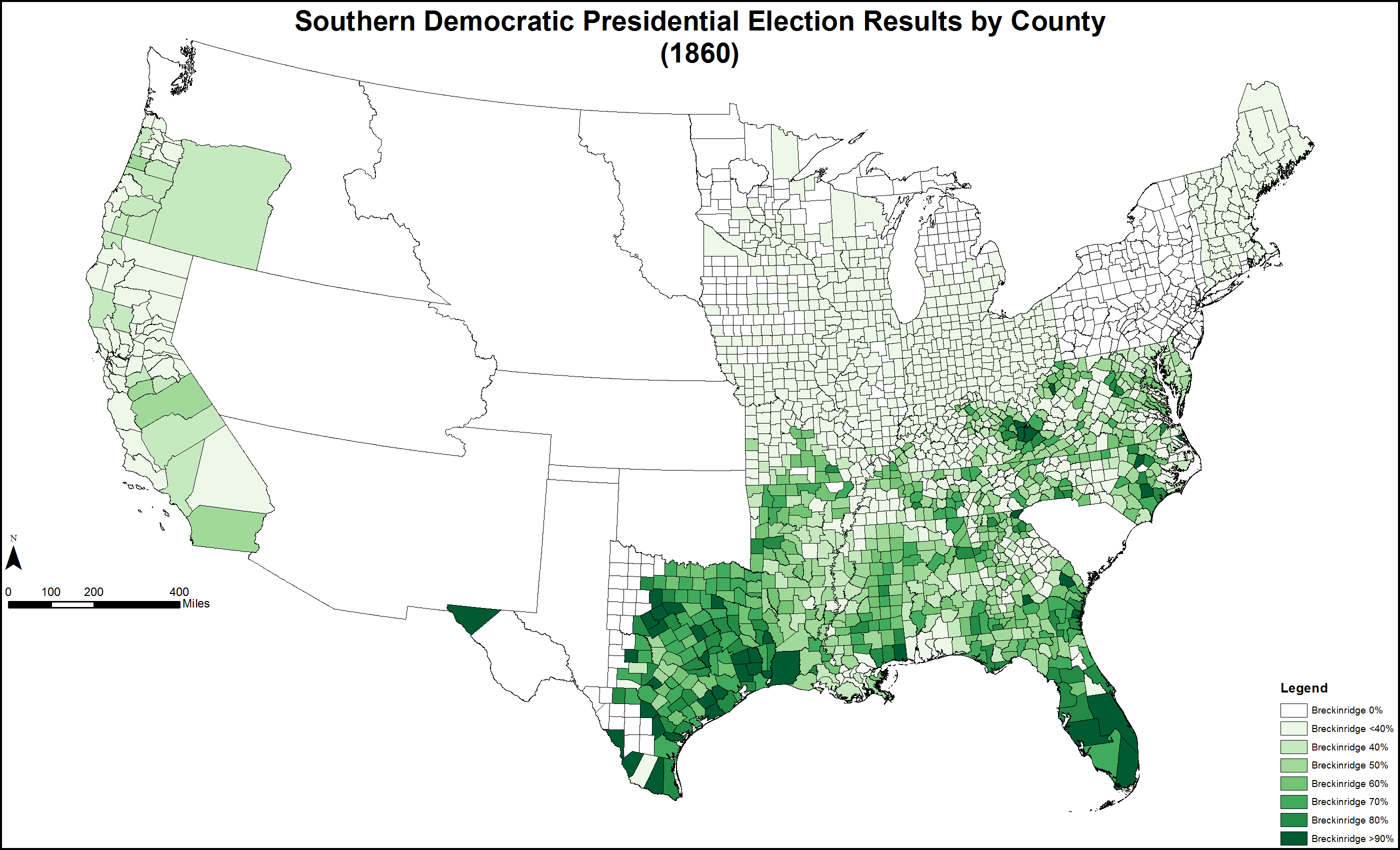
Map of Southern Democratic presidential election results by county

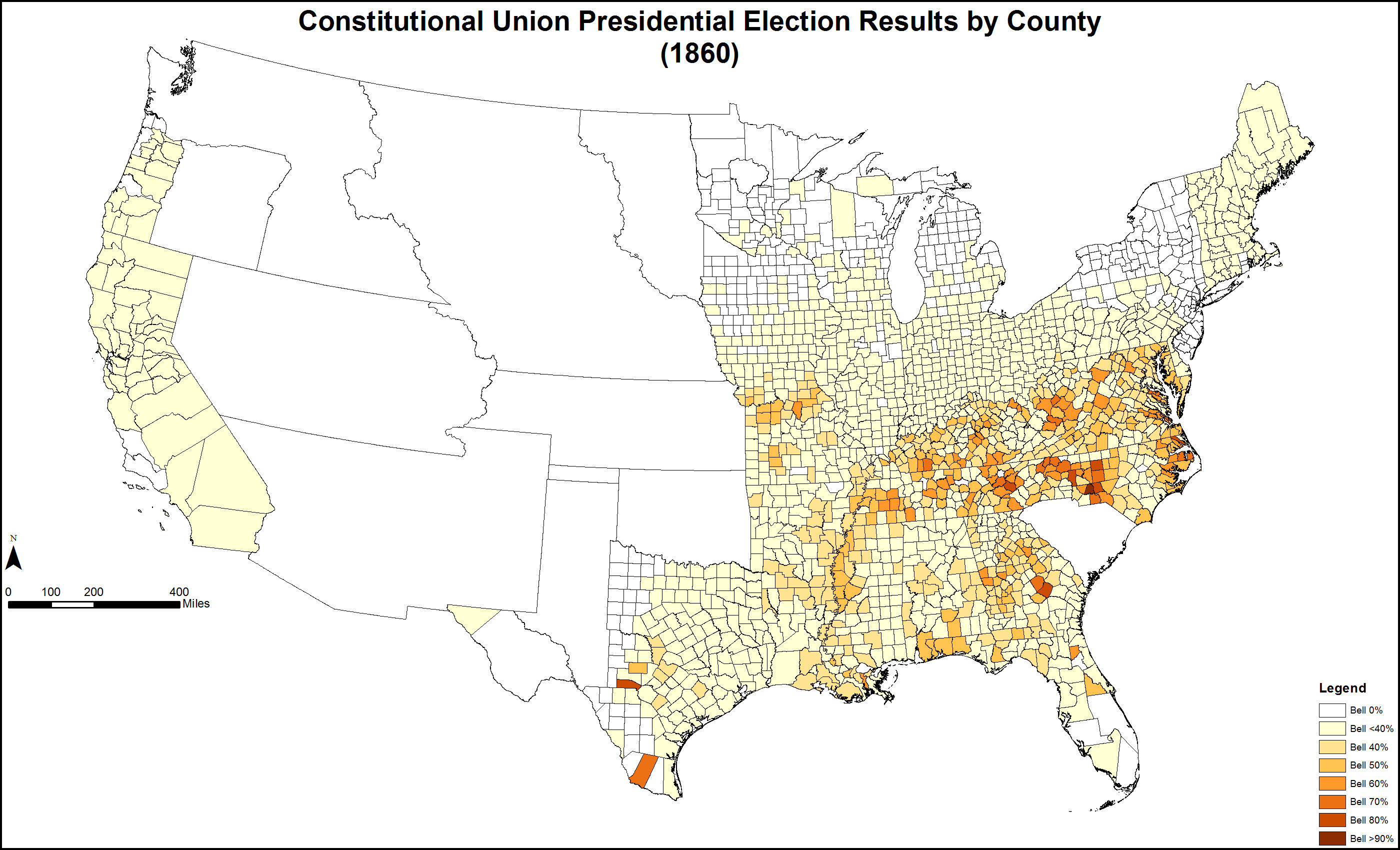
Map of Constitutional Union presidential election results by county

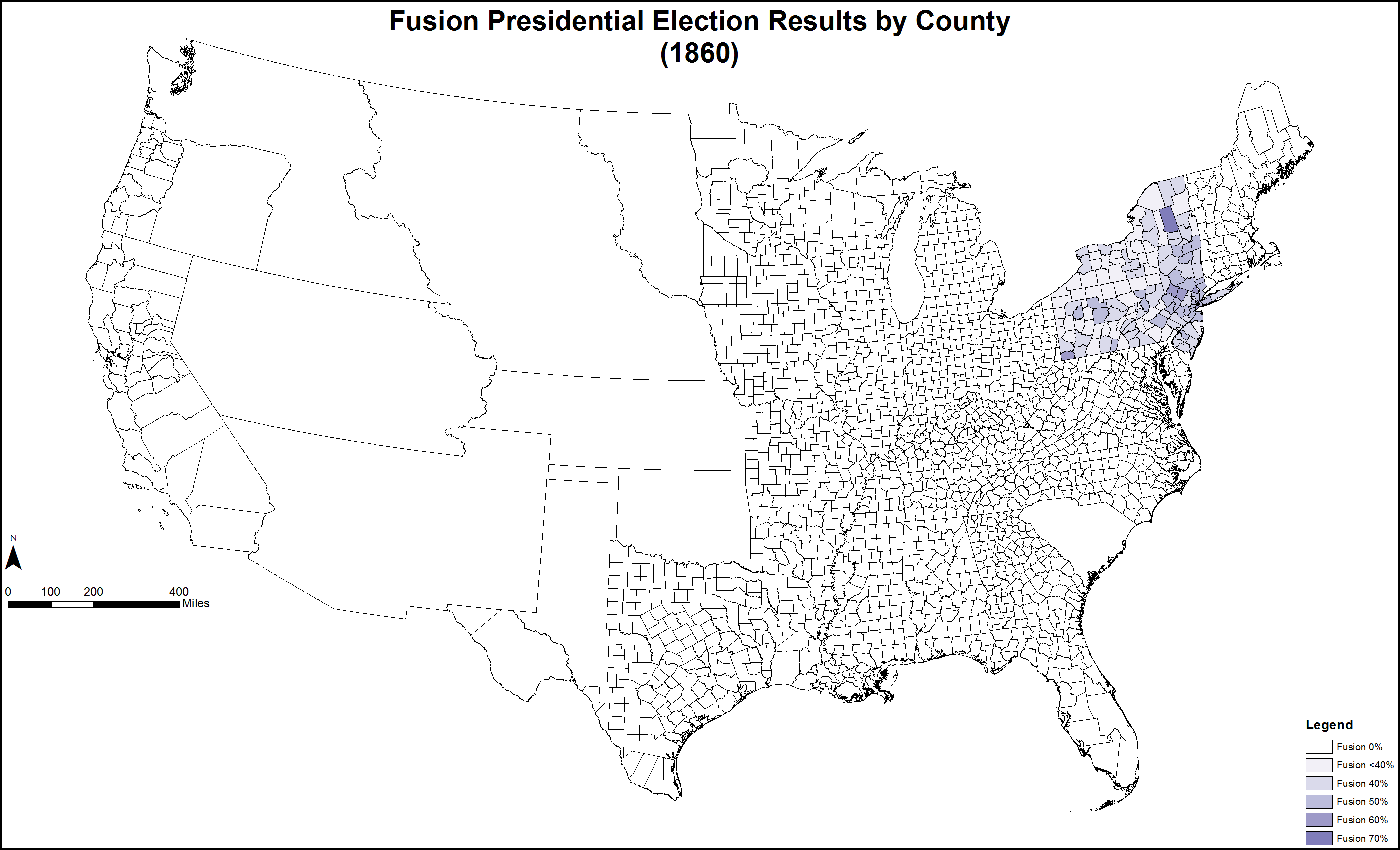
Map of "Fusion" slate presidential election results by county

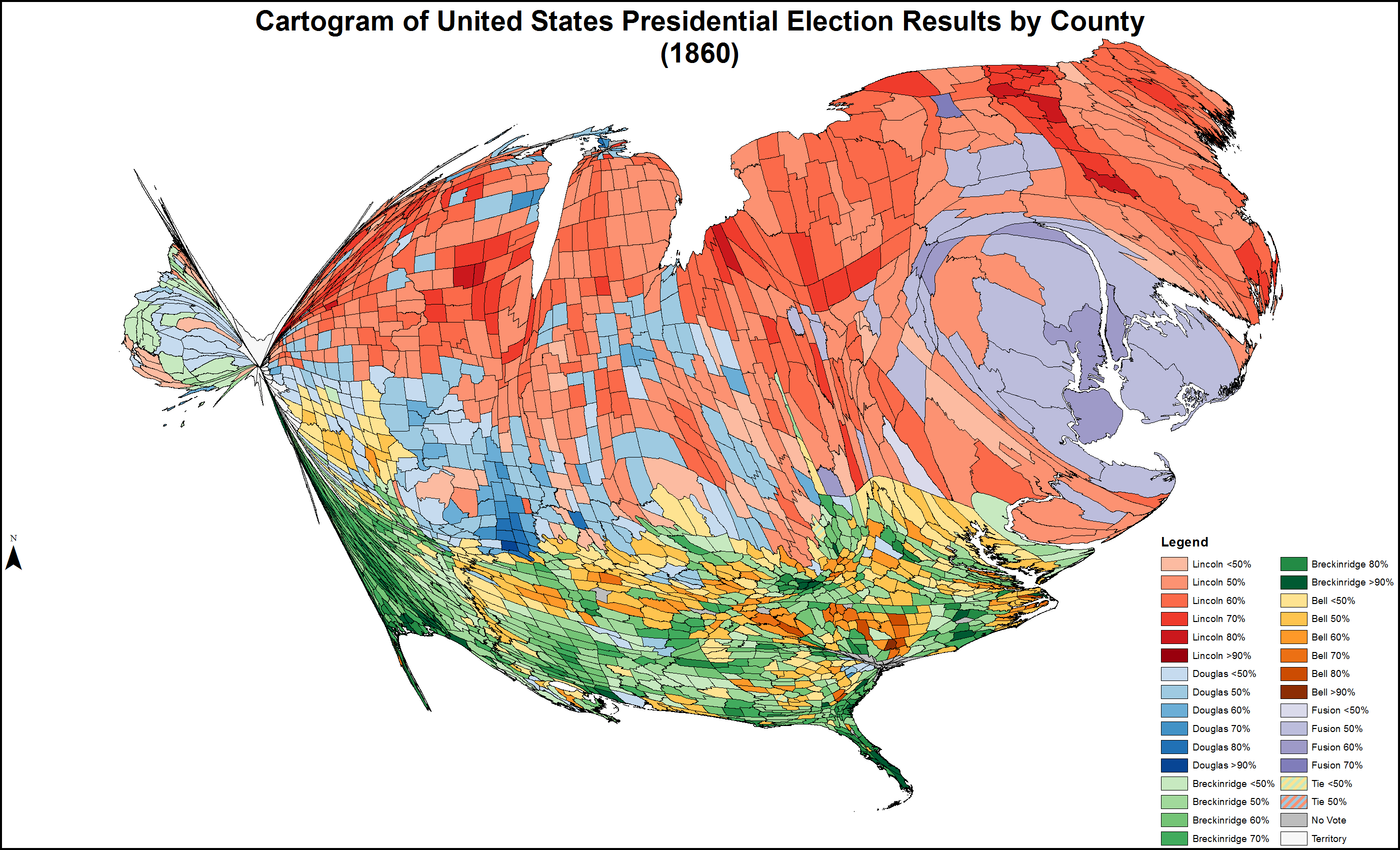
Cartogram of presidential election results by county

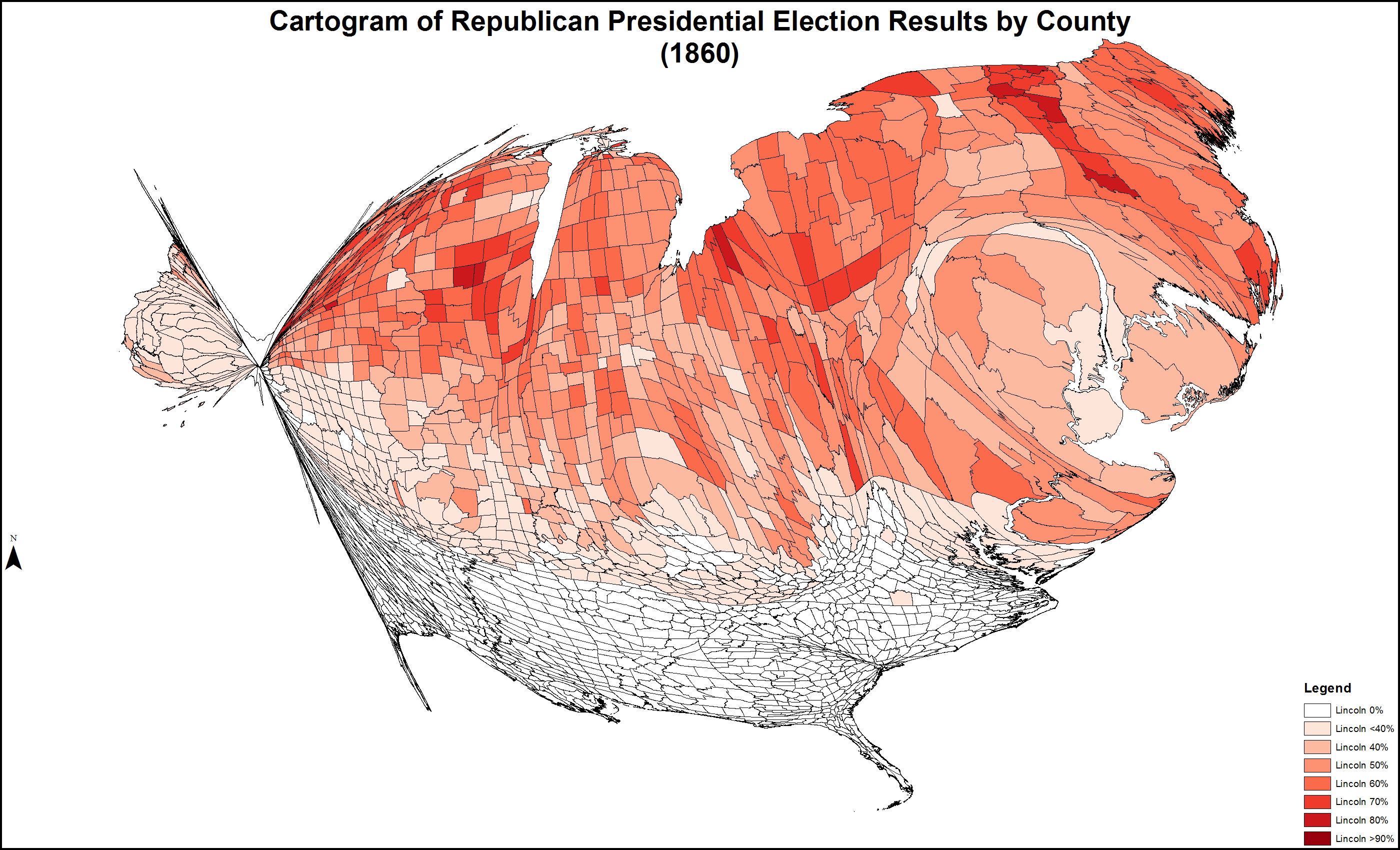
Cartogram of Republican presidential election results by county

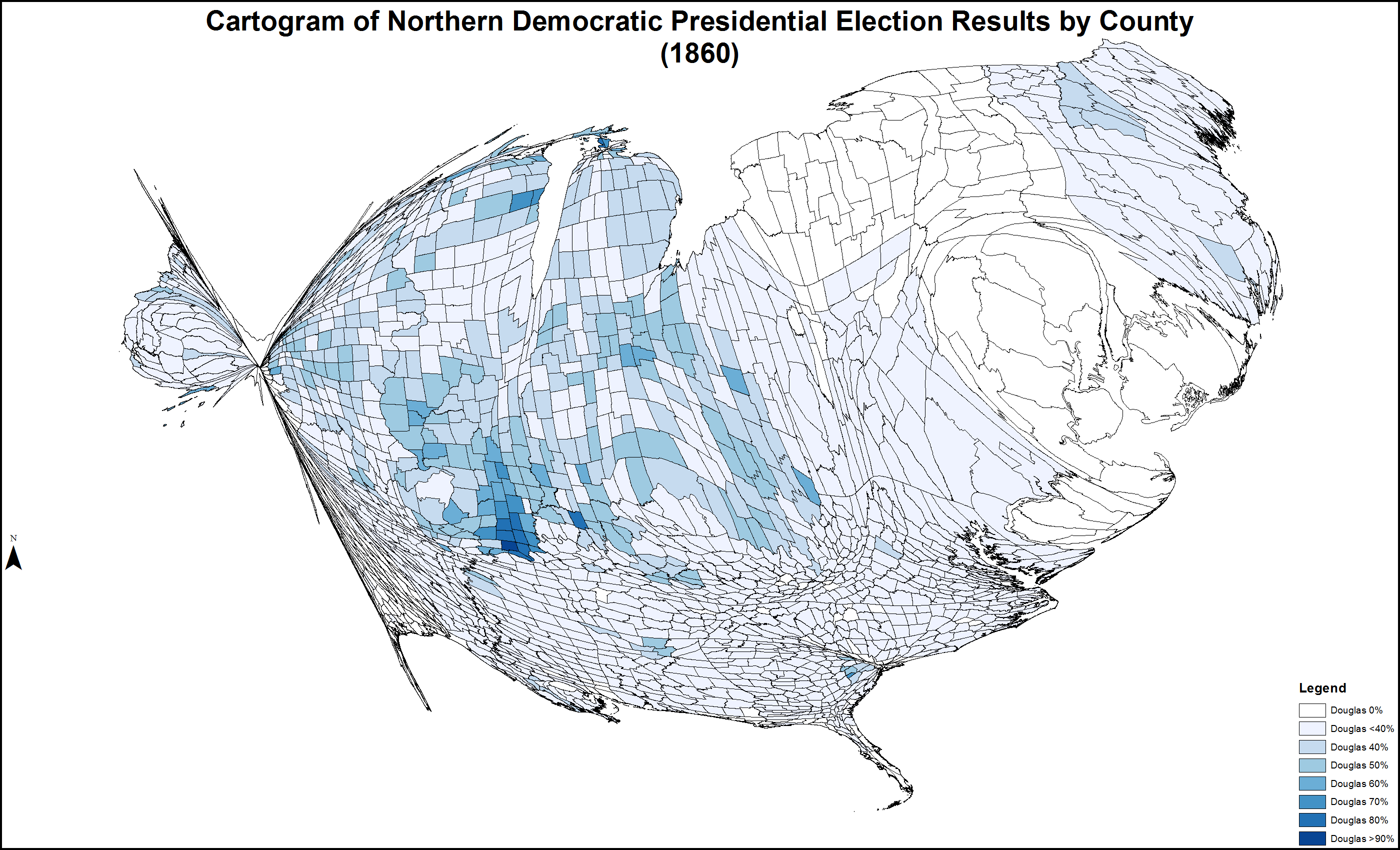
Cartogram of Northern Democratic presidential election results by county

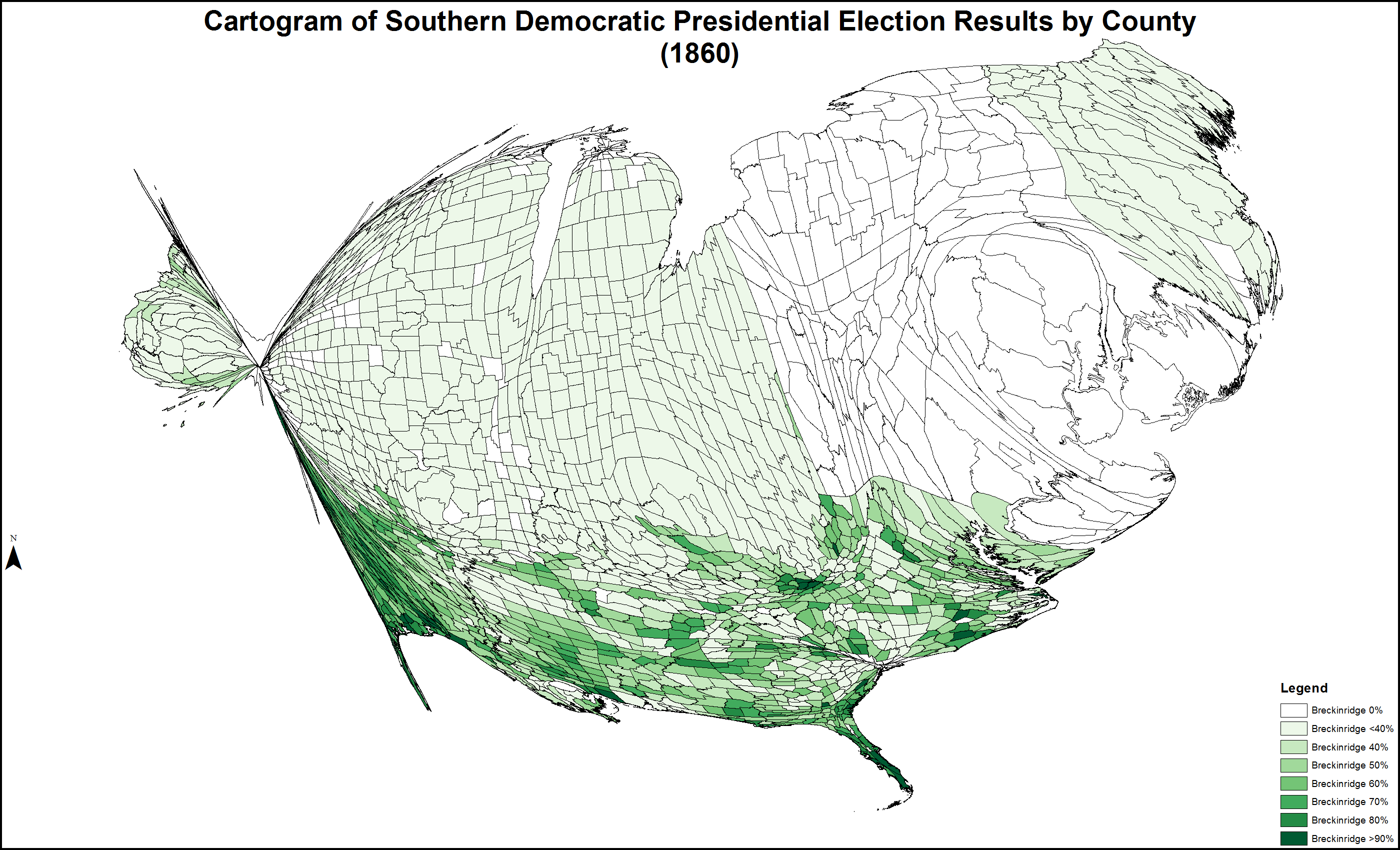
Cartogram of Southern Democratic presidential election results by county

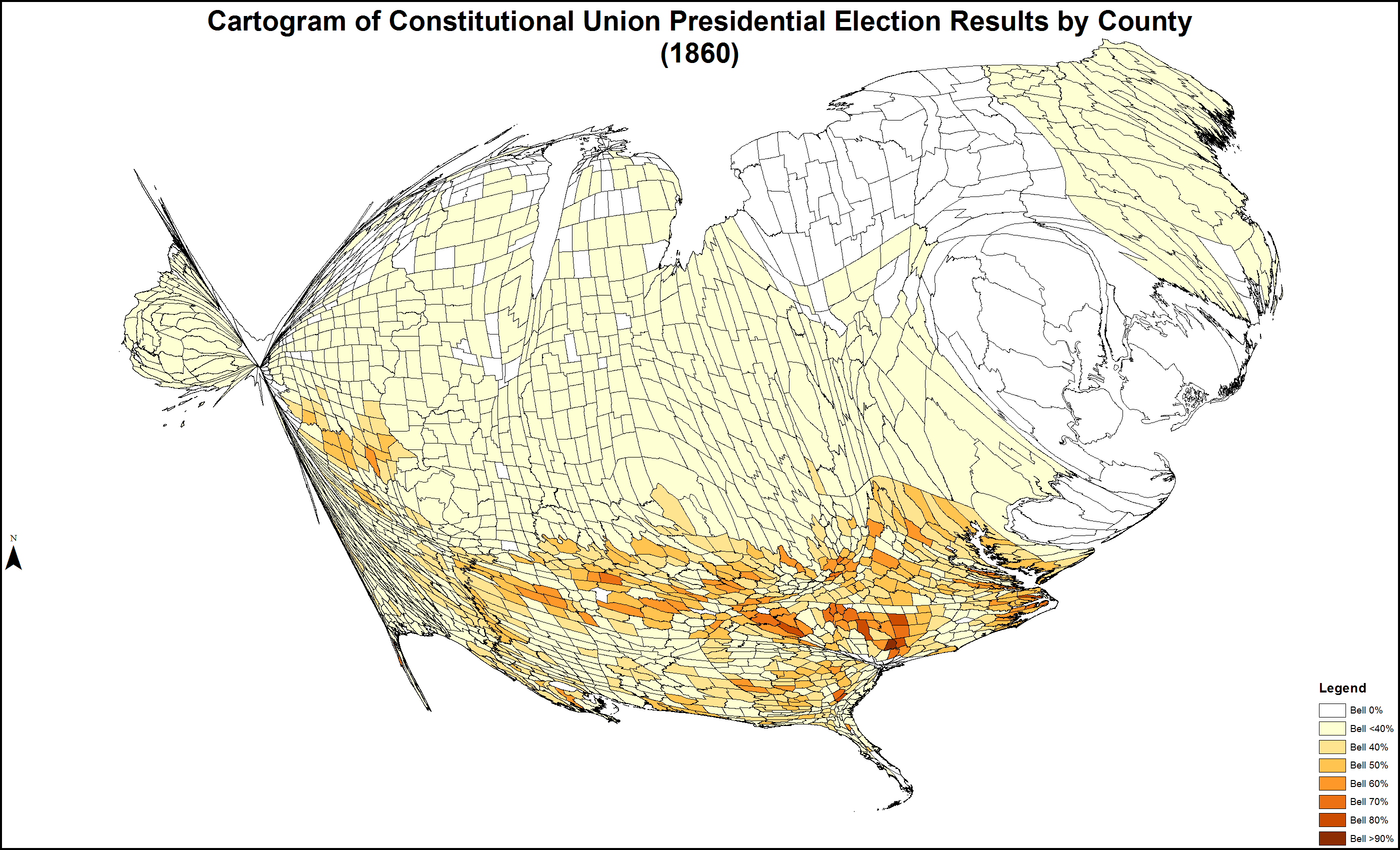
Cartogram of Constitutional Union presidential election results by county

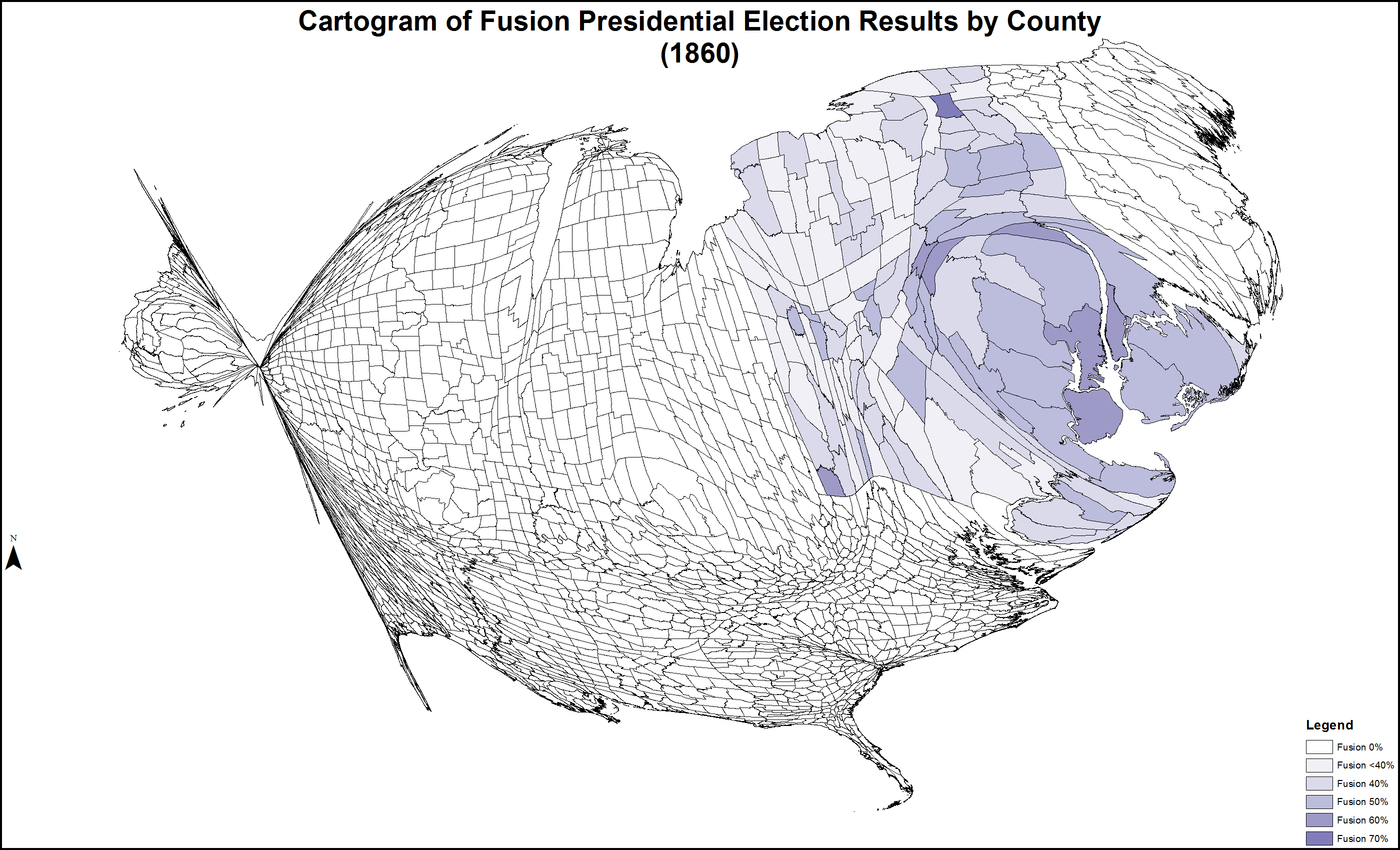
Cartogram of "Fusion" slate presidential election results by county

== Results by state ==
States/districts won by Douglas/Johnson
States/districts won by Breckinridge/Lane
States/districts won by Lincoln/Hamlin
States/districts won by Bell/Everett

		Abraham Lincoln Republican			Stephen Douglas (Northern) Democratic			John Breckinridge (Southern) Democratic			John Bell Constitutional Union			Other			Margin		State Total	
State	electoral votes	#	%	electoral votes	#	%	electoral votes	#	%	electoral votes	#	%	electoral votes	#	%	electoral votes	#	%	#	
Alabama	9	no ballots			13,618	15.11	-	48,669	54.0	9	27,835	30.89	-	no ballots			-20,834	-23.11	90,122	AL
Arkansas	4	no ballots			5,390 (Note: The total of the county returns. The stated total was 5,227)	9.94	-	28,732	52.99	4	20,095 (Note: Stated total was 20,094)	37.06	-	no ballots			-8,637	-15.93	54,217	AR
California	4	38,734	32.31	4	38,025 (Note: Stated total was 38,023)	31.72	-	33,975	28.34	-	9,136	7.62	-	no ballots			709	0.59	119,870	CA
Connecticut	6	43,486	53.86	6	17,364	21.50	-	16,558	20.51	-	3,337	4.13	-	no ballots			28,057	32.36	80,745	CT
Delaware	3	3,822	23.72	-	1,066	6.62	-	7,339	45.55	3	3,886	24.12	-	no ballots			-3,453	-21.43	16,113	DE
Florida	3	no ballots			221	1.69	-	8,155	62.22	3	4,731	36.10	-	no ballots			-3,424	-26.12	13,107	FL
Georgia	10	no ballots			11,687	10.94	-	52,181 (Note: Stated total was 52,210)	48.85	10	42,954 (Note: Stated total was 43,083)	40.21	-	no ballots			-9,227	-8.64	106,822	GA
Illinois (Note: The returns of Monroe and Pulaski Counties were not included in the official returns "on account of informality." Including them, the totals would be Lincoln: 172,171 Douglas: 160,215 Breckinridge: 2,331 Bell: 4,914 Smith: 35)	11	171,106	50.84	11	158,264 (Note: Stated total was 158,254)	47.03	-	2,291 (Note: Stated total was 2,292)	0.68	-	4,852 (Note: Stated total was 4,851)	1.44	-	35 (Note: Smith)	0.01	-	12,842	3.81	336,548	IL
Indiana	13	139,013 (Note: Stated total was 138,963)	51.14	13	115,166 (Note: Stated total was 115,168)	42.37	-	12,295 (Note: Stated total was 12,296)	4.52	-	5,339 (Note: Stated total was 5,345)	1.96	-	5 (Note: Smith)	0.002	-	23,847	8.77	271,818	IN
Iowa (Note: The return of Wright County was not included in the official returns. Including it, the totals would be Lincoln: 70,406 Douglas: 55,114 Breckinridge: 1,052 Bell: 1,763)	4	70,316	54.85	4	55,091	42.97	-	1,038 (Note: Stated total was 1,035)	0.81	-	1,763	1.38	-	no ballots			15,225	11.88	128,208	IA
Kentucky	12	1,364	0.93	-	25,641 (Note: Stated total was 25,652)	17.54	-	53,143	36.35	-	66,058	45.18	12	no ballots			12,915	-8.83	146,206	KY
Louisiana	6	no ballots			7,625	15.10	-	22,681	44.90	6	20,204	40.0	-	no ballots			-2,477	-4.90	50,510	LA
Maine	8	62,915	62.23	8	29,761	29.44	-	6,377	6.31	-	2,046	2.02	-	no ballots			33,154	32.79	101,099	ME
Maryland	8	2,296	2.48	-	6,080	6.56	-	42,505	45.88	8	41,768	45.08	-	no ballots			-737	-0.8	92,649	MD
Massachusetts	13	106,533	62.91	13	34,370	20.3	-	6,105	3.61	-	22,332	13.19	-	no ballots			72,163	42.61	169,340	MA
Michigan	6	88,450	57.23	6	64,889	41.98	-	805	0.52	-	415	0.27	-	no ballots			23,561	15.25	154,559	MI
Minnesota	4	22,076	63.44	4	11,923 (Note: Stated total was 11,922)	34.27	-	744	2.14	-	53	0.15	-	no ballots			10,153	29.17	34,796	MN
Mississippi	7	no ballots			3,288	4.76	-	40,797	59.01	7	25,045	36.23	-	no ballots			-15,752	-22.78	69,130	MS
Missouri	9	17,029	10.3	-	58,804	35.55	9	31,312	18.93	-	58,261	35.22	-	no ballots			-543	-0.33	165,406	MO
New Hampshire	5	37,519	56.90	5	25,887 (Note: Stated total was 25,883)	39.26	-	2,125	3.22	-	412	0.62	-	no ballots			11,632	17.64	65,943	NH
New Jersey	7	58,344 (Note: Stated total was 58,346)	48.13	4 (Note: The Fusion slate consisted of 3 electors pledged to Douglas, and 2 each to Breckinridge and Bell. Nonetheless, different electors appeared in some counties for Breckinridge and Bell, resulting in lower totals and a split electoral outcome as electors were voted on individually. The 3 Douglas electors and 4 of the electors pledged to Lincoln won)	no ballots		3	no ballots		-	no ballots		-	62,869	51.87	-	-4,525	-3.74	121,213	NJ
New York (Note: The returns of Orange and Sullivan Counties were not included in the official returns, "apparently because they were received too late", even though their returns for all other elections were included. Including them, the totals would be Lincoln: 362,646 Fusion: 314,282)	35	353,804	53.7	35	no ballots		-	no ballots		-	no ballots		-	305,101	46.3	(Note: The slate of electors were pledged to 3 different candidates: 18 to Douglas, 10 to Bell, and 7 to Breckinridge.)	48,703	7.4	658,905	NY
North Carolina (Note: The returns of Bladen and Madison Counties were not included in the official returns. Including them, the totals would be Douglas: 2,738 Breckinridge: 49,463 Bell: 45,671)	10	no ballots			2,701	2.81	-	48,539	50.44	10	44,990	46.75	-	no ballots			-3,549	-3.69	96,230	NC
Ohio	23	231,808 (Note: Stated total was 231,809)	52.33	23	187,419 (Note: Stated total was 187,421)	42.31	-	11,404 (Note: Stated total was 11,403)	2.57	-	12,194 (Note: Stated total was 12,193)	2.75	-	136 (Note: Smith)	0.03	-	44,389	10.02	442,961	OH
Oregon	3	5,344	36.20	3	4,131	27.99	-	5,074	34.37	-	212	1.44	-	no ballots			270	1.83	14,761	OR
Pennsylvania	27	268,030	56.26	27	16,765	3.52	(Note: Not all of the Douglas supporters agreed to the Reading slate deal and established a separate Douglas-only ticket. This slate comprised the 12 Douglas electoral candidates on the Reading ticket, and 15 additional Douglas supporters. This ticket was usually referred to as the Straight Douglas ticket. Thus 12 electoral candidates appeared on 2 tickets, Reading and Straight Douglas.)	no ballots			12,770	2.68	-	178,871 (Note: This vote is listed under the Fusion column, not the Breckinridge column as many other sources do, because this ticket was pledged to either of two candidates based on the national result. Additionally, the slate was almost equally divided between the supporters of Breckinridge and Douglas.)	37.54	(Note: The Democratic Party chose its slate of electors before the National Convention in Charleston, SC. Since this was decided before the party split, both Douglas supporters and Breckinridge supporters claimed the right for their man to be considered the party candidate and the support of the electoral slate. Eventually, the state party worked out an agreement: if either candidate could win the national election with Pennsylvania's electoral vote, then all her electoral votes would go to that candidate. Of the 27 electoral candidates, 15 were Breckinridge supporters; the remaining 12 were for Douglas. This was often referred to as the Reading electoral slate, because it was in that city that the state party chose it.)	89,159	18.72	476,436	PA
Rhode Island	4	12,244	61.37	4	7,707 (Note: The Douglas ticket was supported by Breckinridge and Bell supporters.)	38.63	-	no ballots			no ballots			no ballots			4,537	22.74	19,951	RI
South Carolina	8	no popular vote			no popular vote			no popular vote		8	no popular vote			no popular vote			-	-	-	SC
Tennessee	12	no ballots			11,384	7.79	-	65,053	44.51	-	69,710	47.7	12	no ballots			-4,657	-3.19	146,147	TN
Texas (Note: The returns of Comanche, Hidalgo, and Newton Counties were not included in the official returns as they arrived after the deadline. Including them, the totals would be Breckinridge: 47,907 Bell: 15,443)	4	no ballots			18	0.03	-	47,639 (Note: Stated total was 47,640)	75.54	4	15,422 (Note: Stated total was 15,523)	24.46	-	no ballots			-32,217	-51.08	63,061	TX
Vermont	5	33,808 (Note: Stated total was 33,888)	75.9	5	8,649	19.42	-	1,866	4.19	-	218 (Note: Stated total was 217)	0.49	-	no ballots			25,159	56.48	44,541	VT
Virginia (Note: The return of Wyoming County was not included in the official returns as it was received too late. Including it, the totals would be Lincoln: 1,909 Douglas: 16,192 Breckinridge: 74,379 Bell: 74,751)	15	1,909 (Note: Stated total was 1,929)	1.14	-	16,183	9.68	-	74,350	44.49	-	74,691 (Note: Stated total was 74,641)	44.69	15 (Note: 6 Breckinridge electors were elected but all voted for Bell)	no ballots			-341	-0.2	167,133	VA
Wisconsin	5	86,114	56.59	5	65,024	42.73	-	889	0.58	-	153	0.1	-	no ballots			21,090	13.86	152,180	WI
TOTALS:	303	1,855,276	39.67	180	1,004,042	21.47	12	672,601	14.38	72	590,980	12.64	39	553,746	11.84	0			4,676,645	US
TO WIN:	152																			

=== States that flipped from Democratic to Constitutional Union ===
- Kentucky
- Tennessee
- Virginia

=== States that flipped from Know Nothing to Democratic ===
- Maryland

=== States that flipped from Democratic to Republican ===
- California
- Illinois
- Indiana
- New Jersey (EVs only)
- Pennsylvania

=== Close states ===
States where the margin of victory was under 1%:

1. Virginia 0.2% (341 votes)
2. Missouri 0.33% (543 votes)
3. California 0.59% (709 votes)
4. Maryland 0.8% (737 votes)

States where the margin of victory was under 5%:

1. Oregon 1.83% (270 votes)
2. Tennessee 3.19% (4,657 votes)
3. North Carolina 3.69% (3,549 votes)
4. Illinois 3.81% (12,842 votes)
5. New Jersey 3.74% (4,525 votes)
6. Louisiana 4.90% (2,477 votes)

States where the margin of victory was under 10%:

1. New York 7.4% (48,703 votes) (tipping point state for Lincoln's victory)
2. Georgia 8.64% (9,227 votes)
3. Indiana 8.77% (23,847 votes)
4. Kentucky 8.83% (12,915 votes)

=== County statistics ===
Counties with highest percentage of Republican vote:

1. Kanabec County, Minnesota - 100.00%
2. Emmet County, Iowa - 100.00%
3. Mille Lacs County, Minnesota - 94.74%
4. Grundy County, Iowa - 88.13%
5. Hancock County, Iowa - 87.88%

Counties with highest percentage of Southern Democratic vote:

1. Brevard County, Florida - 100.00%
2. Dade County, Florida - 100.00%
3. Hidalgo County, Texas - 100.00%
4. Manatee County, Florida - 100.00%
5. Zapata County, Texas - 100.00%

Counties with highest percentage of Constitutional Union vote:

1. Stanly County, North Carolina - 93.78%
2. Montgomery County, North Carolina - 87.35%
3. Montgomery County, Georgia - 84.72%
4. Camden County, North Carolina - 84.68%
5. Bandera County, Texas - 84.21%

Counties with highest percentage of Democratic vote:

1. Johnson County, Illinois - 96.96%
2. Hamilton County, Illinois - 88.54%
3. Palo Alto County, Iowa - 87.88%
4. Saline County, Illinois - 85.44%
5. Pope County, Illinois - 85.07%

Counties with highest percentage of Fusion vote:

1. Hamilton County, New York - 77.7%
2. Pike County, Pennsylvania - 68.56%
3. New York County, New York - 65.24%
4. Sussex County, New Jersey - 63.58%
5. Richmond County, New York - 62.73%

== Trigger for the Civil War ==
Lincoln's victory and imminent inauguration as president was the immediate cause for declarations of secession by seven Southern states (South Carolina, Mississippi, Florida, Alabama, Georgia, Louisiana, and Texas) from 20 December 1860 to 1 February 1861. They then formed the Confederate States of America. On 9 February 1861, Jefferson Davis was elected president of the Confederacy.

Several other states also considered declaring secession at the time:

- Missouri convened a secession convention, which voted against secession and adjourned permanently.
- Arkansas convened a secession convention, which voted against secession and adjourned temporarily.
- Virginia convened a secession convention, which voted against secession but remained in session.
- Tennessee held a referendum on having a secession convention, which failed.
- North Carolina held a referendum on having a secession convention, which failed.

All of the secessionist activity was motivated by fear for the institution of slavery in the South. If the President (and, by extension, the appointed federal officials in the South, such as district attorneys, marshals, postmasters, and judges) opposed slavery, it might collapse. There were fears that abolitionist agents would infiltrate the South and foment slave insurrections. (The noted secessionist William Lowndes Yancey, speaking at New York's Cooper Institute in October 1860, asserted that with abolitionists in power, "Emissaries will percolate between master [and] slave as water between the crevices of rocks underground. They will be found everywhere, with strychnine to put in our wells.") Less radical Southerners thought that with Northern antislavery dominance of the federal government, slavery would eventually be abolished, regardless of present constitutional limits.

Bertram Wyatt-Brown argues that secessionists desired independence as necessary for their honor. They could no longer tolerate Northern state attitudes that regarded slave ownership as a great sin and Northern politicians who insisted on stopping the spread of slavery.

Another bloc of Southerners resented Northern criticism of slavery and restrictions on slavery but opposed secession as dangerous and unnecessary. However, the "conditional Unionists" also hoped that when faced with secession, Northerners would stifle anti-slavery rhetoric and accept pro-slavery rules for the territories. It was that group that prevented immediate secession in Virginia, North Carolina, Tennessee, and Arkansas when Lincoln took office on March 4, 1861. He took no action against the secessionists in the seven "Confederate" states, but also declared that secession had no legal validity and refused to surrender federal property in those states. (He also reiterated his opposition to slavery anywhere in the territories.) Preparing to form an army, on 6 March 1861 Davis called for 100,000 volunteers to serve for twelve months. The political standoff continued until mid-April, when Davis ordered Confederate troops to bombard and capture Fort Sumter.

Lincoln then called for troops to put down rebellion, which wiped out the possibility that the crisis could be resolved by compromise. Nearly all "conditional Unionists" joined the secessionists, including for example presidential candidate John Bell of the Constitutional Union Party, whose home state of Tennessee was the last to secede. The Virginia convention and the reconvened Arkansas convention both declared secession, as did the legislatures of Tennessee and North Carolina; all four states joined the Confederacy. Missouri and Kentucky stayed in the United States, but had unrecognized dual governments.

After the Civil War begun, Douglas then threw his support behind Lincoln and undertook a tour to bolster support for the Union, making visits to Virginia, Ohio and Illinois. Douglas declared "There are no neutrals, only patriots and traitors". However, three months after Lincoln's inauguration, Douglas contracted typhoid fever and died in Chicago on June 3, 1861.

== See also ==
- 1860–61 United States House of Representatives elections
- 1860–61 United States Senate elections
- American election campaigns in the 19th century
- Electoral history of Abraham Lincoln
- First inauguration of Abraham Lincoln
- John Hanks
- History of the United States (1849–1865)
- History of the United States Democratic Party
- History of the United States Republican Party
- Third Party System

== Works cited ==
- Abramson, Paul; Aldrich, John; Rohde, David (1995). Change and Continuity in the 1992 Elections. CQ Press. ISBN 0871878399.
