= 1860 United States presidential election in Rhode Island =

- November 2, 1860
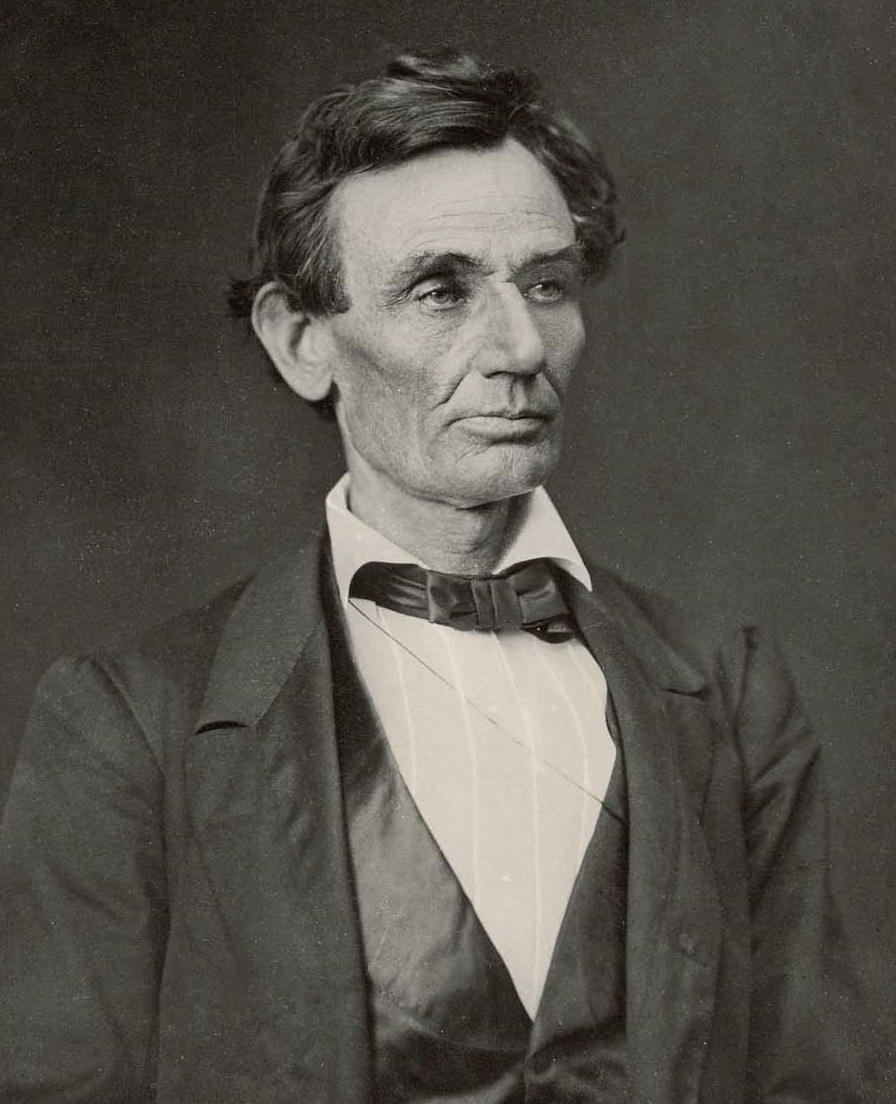

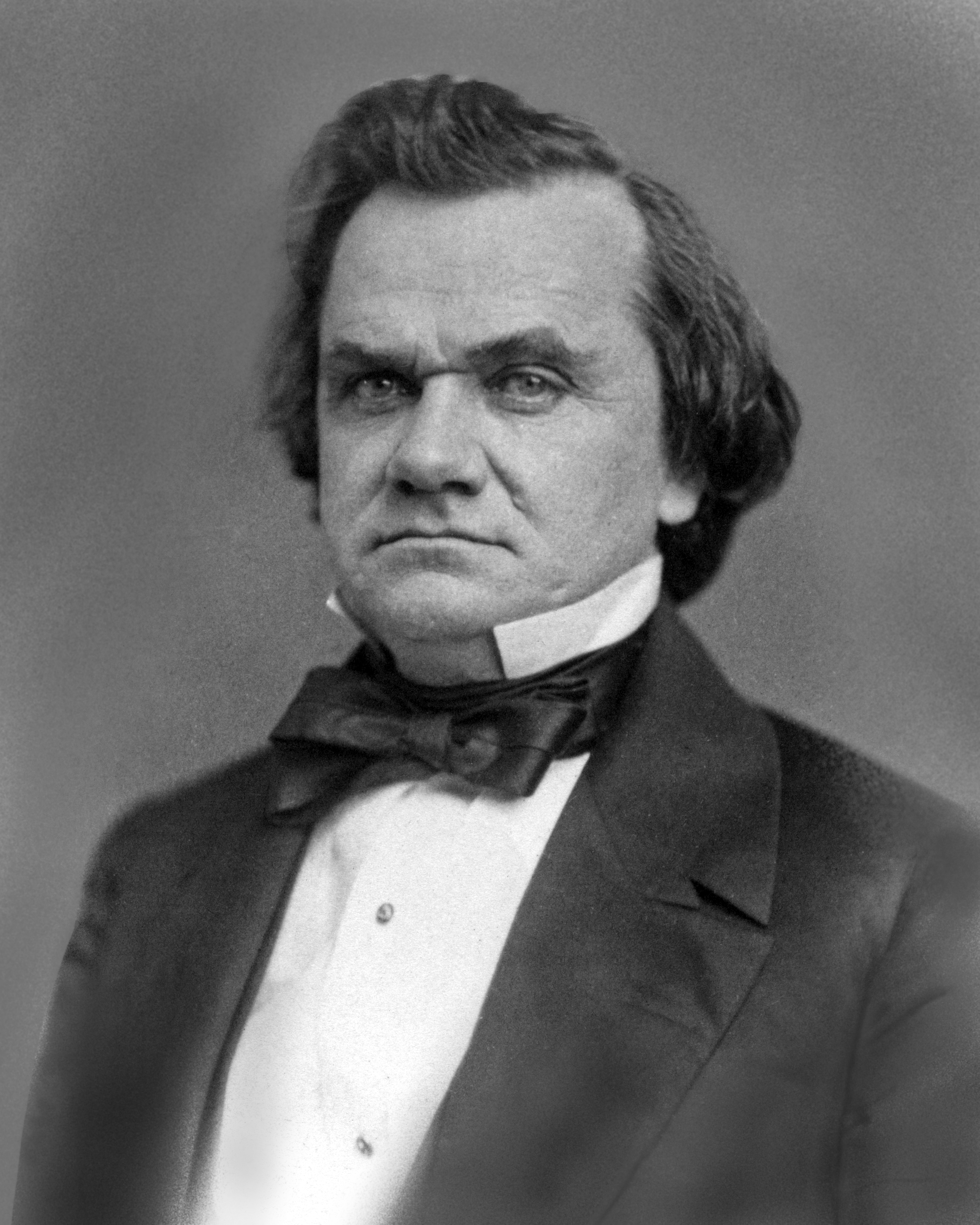

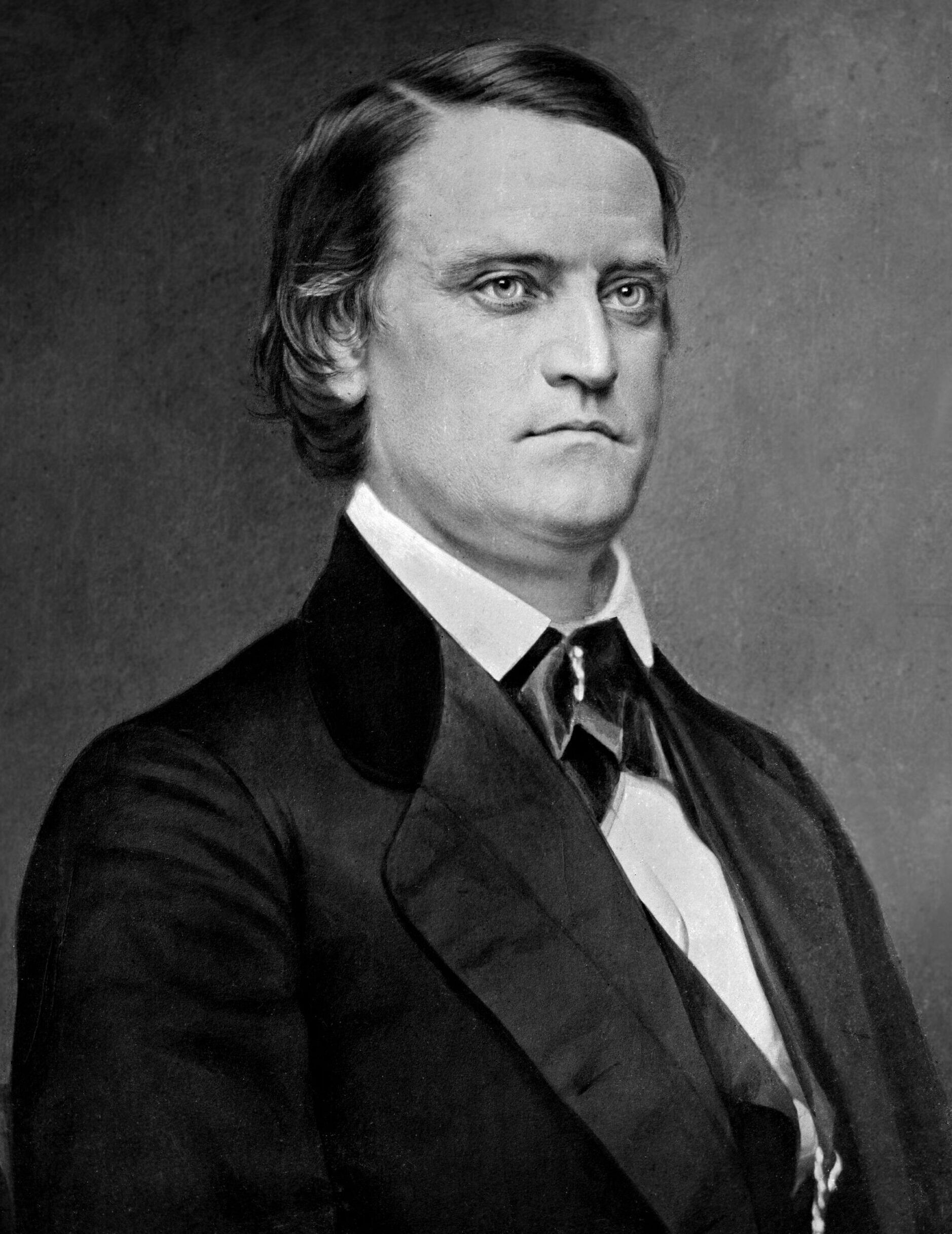

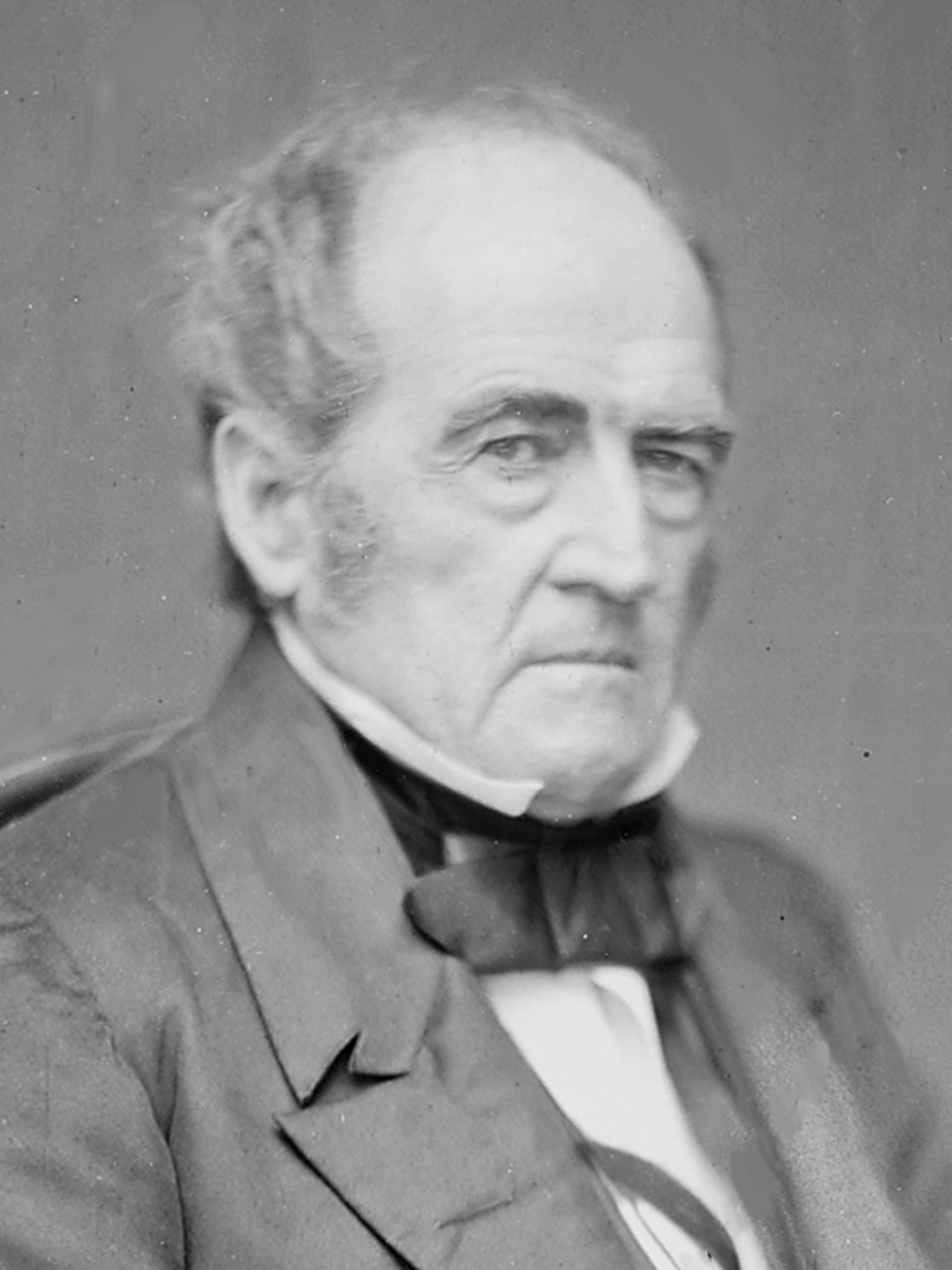
| Nominee | Abraham Lincoln | Stephen Douglas (Dem); John C. Breckinridge (SD); John Bell (CU) |
| Party | Republican | Fusion |
| Alliance | | Democratic; Southern Democratic; Constitutional Union |
| Home state | Illinois | Illinois (Douglas); Kentucky (Breckinridge); Tennessee (Bell) |
| Running mate | Hannibal Hamlin | Herschel V. Johnson (Dem); Joseph Lane (SD); Edward Everett (CU) |
| Electoral vote | 4 | 0 |
| Popular vote | 12,244 | 7,707 |
| Percentage | 61.37% | 38.63% |
County results
Lincoln
50–60%
60–70%
President before election
James Buchanan
Democratic
Elected President
Abraham Lincoln
Republican

The 1860 United States presidential election in Rhode Island took place on November 2, 1860, as part of the 1860 United States presidential election. Voters chose four electors of the Electoral College, who voted for president and vice president.

Rhode Island was won by Republican candidate Abraham Lincoln, who won by a margin of 22.74%.

== Results ==
1860 United States presidential election in Rhode Island
| Party | Candidate | Votes | Percentage | Electoral votes |
|---|---|---|---|---|
| Republican | Abraham Lincoln | 12,244 | 61.37% | 4 |
| Fusion | Stephen A. Douglas / John C. Breckinridge / John Bell | 7,707 | 38.63% | 0 |
| Totals | | 19,951 | 100.00% | 4 |

=== Results by county ===
1860 United States Presidential Election in Rhode Island (by county)
| County | Abraham Lincoln Republican | | Stephen A. Douglas/ John C. Breckinridge/ John Bell Fusion | | Total votes cast |
| County | # | % | # | % | Total votes cast |
|---|---|---|---|---|---|
| Bristol | 667 | 59.08% | 462 | 40.92% | 1,129 |
| Kent | 1,246 | 65.48% | 657 | 34.52% | 1,903 |
| Newport | 1,610 | 64.68% | 879 | 35.32% | 2,489 |
| Providence | 7,202 | 59.63% | 4,875 | 40.37% | 12,077 |
| Washington | 1,519 | 64.56% | 834 | 35.44% | 2,353 |
| Total | 12,244 | 61.37% | 7,707 | 38.63% | 19,951 |

== Analysis ==
With 61.37% of the popular vote, Rhode Island would prove to be Lincoln's fifth strongest state in terms of popular vote percentage in the 1860 election after Vermont, Minnesota, neighboring Massachusetts and Maine.

Like New Jersey, New York and Pennsylvania, Rhode Island was one of the four states that had a fusion ticket for the Democrats, which was supported not only by the Northern Democrats but also supporters of Southern Democrats and Constitutional Unionists. However, unlike in the other three states the electors on the Democratic ticket in Rhode Island were pledged solely to Douglas, therefore some sources credit the Democratic popular vote to the Northern Democratic nominee.

== See also ==
- United States presidential elections in Rhode Island
