= 1860 United States presidential election in Pennsylvania =

- November 6, 1860
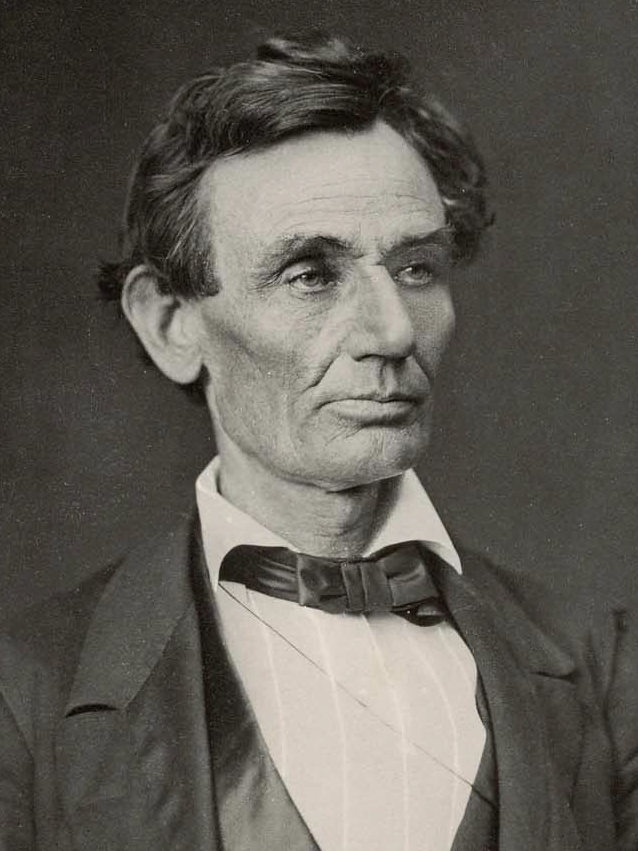

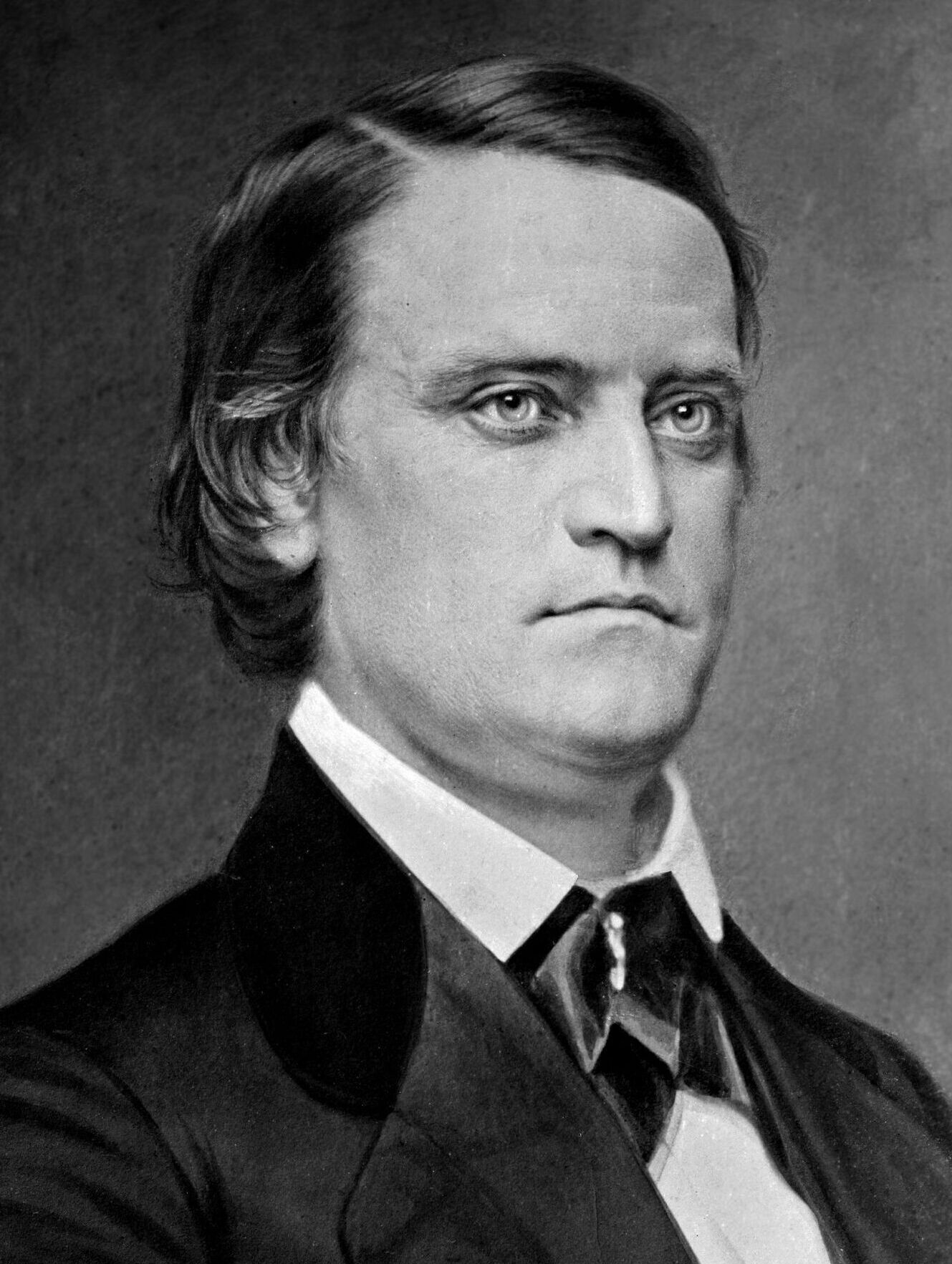

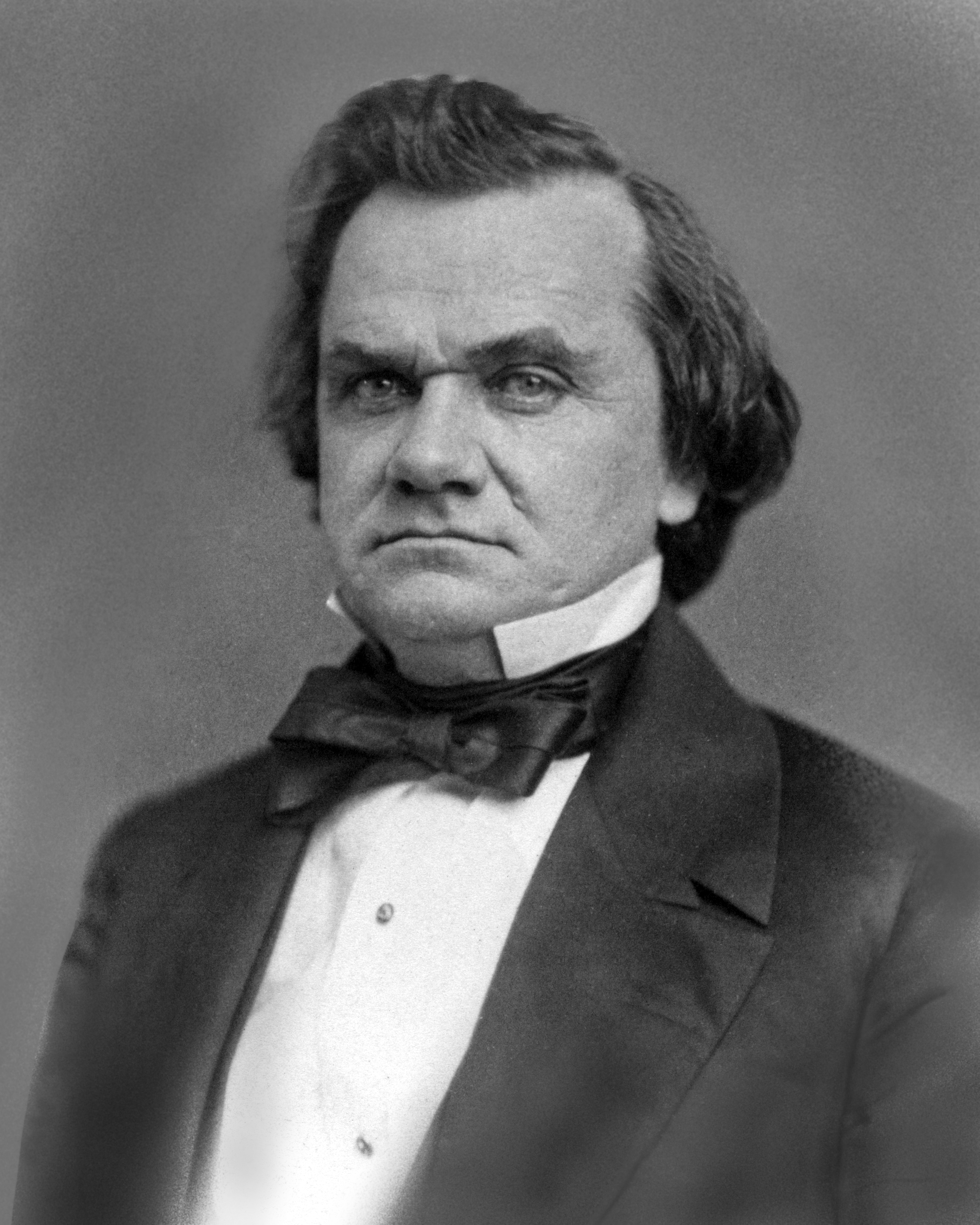
		Fusion
Nominee	Abraham Lincoln	John C. Breckinridge; Stephen A. Douglas
Party	People's	Fusion
Alliance		Democratic; Southern Democratic
Home state	Illinois	Kentucky (B); Illinois (D)
Running mate	Hannibal Hamlin	Joseph Lane (B); Herschel V. Johnson (D)
Electoral vote	27	0
Popular vote	268,030	178,871
Percentage	56.3%	37.5%
County results
Lincoln
40–50%
50–60%
60–70%
70–80%
Fusion
40–50%
50–60%
60–70%
President before election
James Buchanan
Democratic
Elected President
Abraham Lincoln
Republican

A presidential election was held in Pennsylvania on November 6, 1860, as part of the 1860 United States presidential election. The People's ticket of the former U.S. representative from Illinois's 7th congressional district and the senior U.S. senator from Maine Hannibal Hamlin defeated the Fusion ticket nominated by the Pennsylvania Democratic Party.

Lincoln was nominated by the 1860 Republican National Convention and ran as the candidate of the People's Party in Pennsylvania. Formed in 1858, the party united Pennsylvania Republicans and Know Nothings on a protectionist platform that appealed to antislavery and nativist constituencies in both parties. The Pennsylvania Democratic party selected its state ticket in advance of the 1860 Democratic National Conventions, which resulted in a split between the supporters of Stephen A. Douglas and John C. Breckinridge. The so-called "Reading ticket," named after the city in Pennsylvania where the state convention met, was composed of 15 Breckenridge supporters and 12 Douglas supporters; the electors agreed to vote for whichever candidate stood the best chance of defeating Lincoln in the event the fusion ticket carried the state. A minority of Douglas Democrats in Pennsylvania opposed this arrangement and nominated their own ticket of 27 candidates, including the 12 Douglas electors on the Reading ticket. The split in the Democratic ranks effectively conceded the state to Lincoln, ending fears that the defection of protectionist voters to the Constitutional Union Party could cost Republicans the state's 27 electoral votes.

== General election ==
=== Results ===
"Straight" Douglas performance by county margin. Douglas: Douglas—<0.1%; Douglas—0.1-1%; Douglas—1-5%; Douglas—5-10%; Douglas—10-15%

Pennsylvania chose 27 electors on a statewide general ticket. Nineteenth-century election laws required voters to elect each member of the Electoral College individually, rather than as a group. This sometimes resulted in small differences in the number of votes cast for electors pledged to the same presidential candidate, if some voters did not vote for all the electors nominated by a party.

Twelve candidates ran on both the Fusion ("Reading") and the "Straight" Douglas tickets; the official returns compiled by the secretary of the Commonwealth of Pennsylvania record the total number of votes for each candidate but do not include a full breakdown by ticket. Joseph Laubach won 194,834 votes as a Fusion–Douglas elector, the highest total for an candidate endorsed on both tickets. John Alexander Ahl received the most votes of any candidate nominated exclusively on the Reading ticket, and his statewide result is shown here as the best approximation of support for the Fusion electors. Similarly, the result shown for the "Straight" Douglas electors reflects the highest total for a candidate nominated exclusively on the Douglas ticket.

1860 United States presidential election in Pennsylvania
Party	Candidate	Votes	%	±%
People's	Abraham Lincoln; Hannibal Hamlin	268,030	56.26	▲24.28
Fusion	John C. Breckinridge Joseph Lane; Stephen A. Douglas Herschel V. Johnson	178,871	37.54	▼12.55
Douglas Democratic	Stephen A. Douglas Herschel V. Johnson	16,765	3.52	▲3.52
Constitutional Union	John Bell Edward Everett	12,770	2.68	▲2.68
Total votes		476,437	100.00	

=== Results by county ===
1860 United States presidential election in Pennsylvania by county
County	Abraham Lincoln Republican		John C. Breckinridge; Stephen A. Douglas Fusion		Stephen A. Douglas Douglas Democratic		John Bell Constitutional Union		Total
County	#	%	#	%	#	%	#	%	Total
Adams	2,724	50.06%	2,644	48.59%	36	0.66%	38	0.70%	5,442
Allegheny	16,725	68.15%	6,725	27.40%	523	2.13%	570	2.32%	24,543
Armstrong	3,355	60.80%	2,108	38.20%	5	0.09%	50	0.91%	5,518
Beaver	2,824	62.66%	1,621	35.97%	4	0.09%	58	1.29%	4,507
Bedford	2,505	51.87%	2,224	46.06%	14	0.29%	86	1.78%	4,829
Berks	6,709	41.64%	8,846	54.91%	420	2.61%	136	0.84%	16,111
Blair	3,050	61.48%	1,275	25.70%	239	4.82%	397	8.00%	4,961
Bradford	7,091	76.17%	2,188	23.50%	9	0.10%	22	0.24%	9,310
Bucks	6,443	52.82%	5,174	42.41%	487	3.99%	95	0.78%	12,199
Butler	3,640	60.60%	2,332	38.82%	13	0.22%	22	0.37%	6,007
Cambria	2,277	54.81%	1,643	39.55%	110	2.65%	124	2.99%	4,154
Carbon	1,758	50.97%	1,301	37.72%	369	10.70%	21	0.61%	3,449
Centre	3,021	55.07%	2,423	44.17%	26	0.47%	16	0.29%	5,486
Chester	7,771	58.68%	5,008	37.81%	263	1.99%	202	1.53%	13,244
Clarion	1,829	46.67%	2,078	53.02%	0	0.00%	12	0.31%	3,919
Clearfield	1,702	47.80%	1,836	51.56%	0	0.00%	23	0.65%	3,561
Clinton	1,736	56.88%	1,244	40.76%	72	2.36%	0	0.00%	3,052
Columbia	1,873	43.17%	2,366	54.53%	86	1.98%	14	0.32%	4,339
Crawford	5,779	65.49%	2,961	33.56%	62	0.70%	22	0.25%	8,824
Cumberland	3,593	51.71%	3,183	45.81%	26	0.36%	147	2.12%	6,949
Dauphin	4,531	62.18%	2,392	32.83%	195	2.68%	169	2.32%	7,287
Delaware	3,181	62.12%	1,500	29.29%	152	2.97%	288	5.62%	5,121
Elk	407	43.76%	523	56.24%	0	0.00%	0	0.00%	930
Erie	6,160	70.02%	2,531	28.77%	17	0.19%	90	1.02%	8,798
Fayette	3,454	49.82%	3,308	47.71%	24	0.35%	147	2.12%	6,933
Forest	107	69.48%	47	30.52%	0	0.00%	0	0.00%	154
Franklin	4,151	56.37%	2,515	34.15%	622	8.45%	76	1.03%	7,364
Fulton	788	45.05%	911	52.09%	1	0.06%	49	2.80%	1,749
Greene	1,614	37.34%	2,665	61.66%	26	0.60%	17	0.39%	4,322
Huntingdon	3,089	64.52%	1,622	33.88%	55	1.15%	22	0.46%	4,788
Indiana	3,910	74.07%	1,347	25.52%	0	0.00%	22	0.42%	5,279
Jefferson	1,704	59.81%	1,134	39.80%	6	0.21%	5	0.18%	2,849
Juniata	1,494	55.23%	1,147	42.40%	2	0.07%	62	2.29%	2,705
Lancaster	13,352	67.93%	5,135	26.12%	728	3.70%	441	2.24%	19,656
Lawrence	2,937	77.86%	788	20.89%	16	0.42%	31	0.82%	3,772
Lebanon	3,868	65.58%	1,917	32.50%	10	0.17%	103	1.75%	5,898
Lehigh	4,170	49.28%	4,094	48.39%	145	1.71%	52	0.61%	8,461
Luzerne	7,300	51.76%	6,803	48.24%	0	0.00%	0	0.00%	14,103
Lycoming	3,494	56.59%	2,402	38.91%	187	3.03%	91	1.47%	6,174
McKean	1,077	64.49%	591	35.39%	0	0.00%	2	0.12%	1,670
Mercer	3,855	59.75%	2,546	39.46%	2	0.03%	49	0.76%	6,452
Mifflin	1,701	56.53%	1,189	39.51%	83	2.76%	36	1.20%	3,009
Monroe	844	35.21%	1,262	52.65%	291	12.14%	0	0.00%	2,397
Montgomery	5,826	46.18%	5,590	44.31%	509	4.03%	690	5.47%	12,615
Montour	1,043	48.65%	786	36.66%	311	14.51%	4	0.19%	2,144
Northampton	3,839	44.02%	4,597	52.71%	115	1.32%	171	1.96%	8,722
Northumberland	2,422	49.46%	2,306	47.09%	97	1.98%	72	1.47%	4,897
Perry	2,371	57.00%	1,743	41.90%	8	0.19%	38	0.91%	4,160
Philadelphia	39,223	50.78%	21,619	27.99%	9,274	12.01%	7,131	9.23%	77,247
Pike	381	31.41%	831	68.51%	0	0.00%	1	0.08%	1,213
Potter	1,545	74.78%	521	25.22%	0	0.00%	0	0.00%	2,066
Schuylkill	7,568	57.78%	4,968	37.93%	422	3.22%	139	1.06%	13,097
Snyder	1,678	63.25%	910	34.30%	60	2.26%	5	0.19%	2,653
Somerset	3,218	73.07%	1,175	26.68%	1	0.02%	10	0.23%	4,404
Sullivan	429	46.28%	497	53.61%	0	0.00%	1	0.11%	927
Susquehanna	4,470	63.62%	2,548	36.27%	2	0.03%	6	0.09%	7,026
Tioga	4,754	78.57%	1,277	21.10%	11	0.18%	9	0.15%	6,051
Union	1,824	68.31%	812	30.41%	28	1.05%	6	0.22%	2,670
Venango	2,680	57.96%	1,932	41.78%	6	0.13%	6	0.13%	4,624
Warren	2,284	67.67%	1,087	32.21%	4	0.12%	0	0.00%	3,375
Washington	4,724	53.69%	3,975	45.18%	8	0.09%	91	1.03%	8,798
Wayne	2,857	52.16%	2,618	47.80%	0	0.00%	2	0.04%	5,477
Westmoreland	4,887	50.33%	4,796	49.40%	13	0.13%	13	0.13%	9,709
Wyoming	1,286	50.81%	1,237	48.87%	8	0.32%	0	0.00%	2,531
York	5,128	43.60%	5,497	46.74%	562	4.78%	574	4.88%	11,761
Total	268,030	56.26%	178,871	37.54%	16,765	3.52%	12,776	2.68%	476,442

== Analysis ==
Pennsylvania voted for the Republican candidate, Abraham Lincoln, over the fusion ticket. Lincoln won Pennsylvania by a margin of 18.72%. Lincoln's victory was the first of eighteen out of nineteen Republican victories in the state, as Pennsylvania would not vote Democratic again until Franklin D. Roosevelt in 1936, and would not vote for a different candidate again until Theodore Roosevelt’s third-party bid in 1912. Lincoln fashioned his victory in Pennsylvania out of Yankee and some Scots-Irish support.

Pennsylvania in the election was one of the four states that had a fusion ticket for the Democratic Party. The other three states were New Jersey, New York and Rhode Island.

The 1860 presidential election in Pennsylvania began a trend in which the state would vote the same as nearby Michigan in presidential elections, as the two states have voted for president in lockstep with each other on all but three occasions since Lincoln's victory – 1932, 1940, and 1976.

== See also ==
- United States presidential elections in Pennsylvania

== Bibliography ==
- Dubin, Michael J. (2002). United States Presidential Elections, 1788-1860. Jefferson, NC: McFarland and Company. ISBN 978-0-7864-6422-7.
- Foner, Eric (1995). Free Soil, Free Labor, Free Men: The Ideology of the Republican Party Before the Civil War. New York: Oxford University Press. ISBN 978-0-19-509497-8.
- Holt, Michael F. (2017). The Election of 1860: "A Campaign Fraught With Consequences". Lawrence: University Press of Kansas.
