= 1860 United States presidential election in New York =

- November 6, 1860
- Turnout: 95.5% ▲5.6 pp
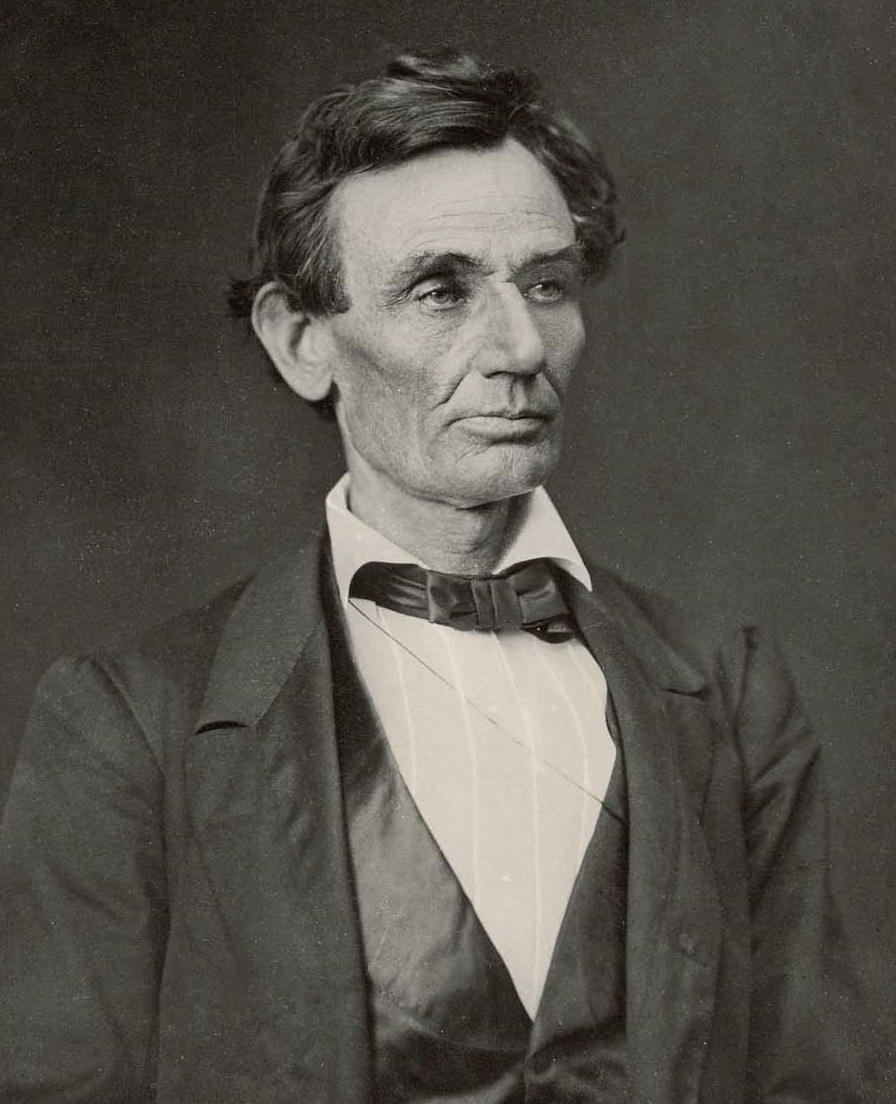

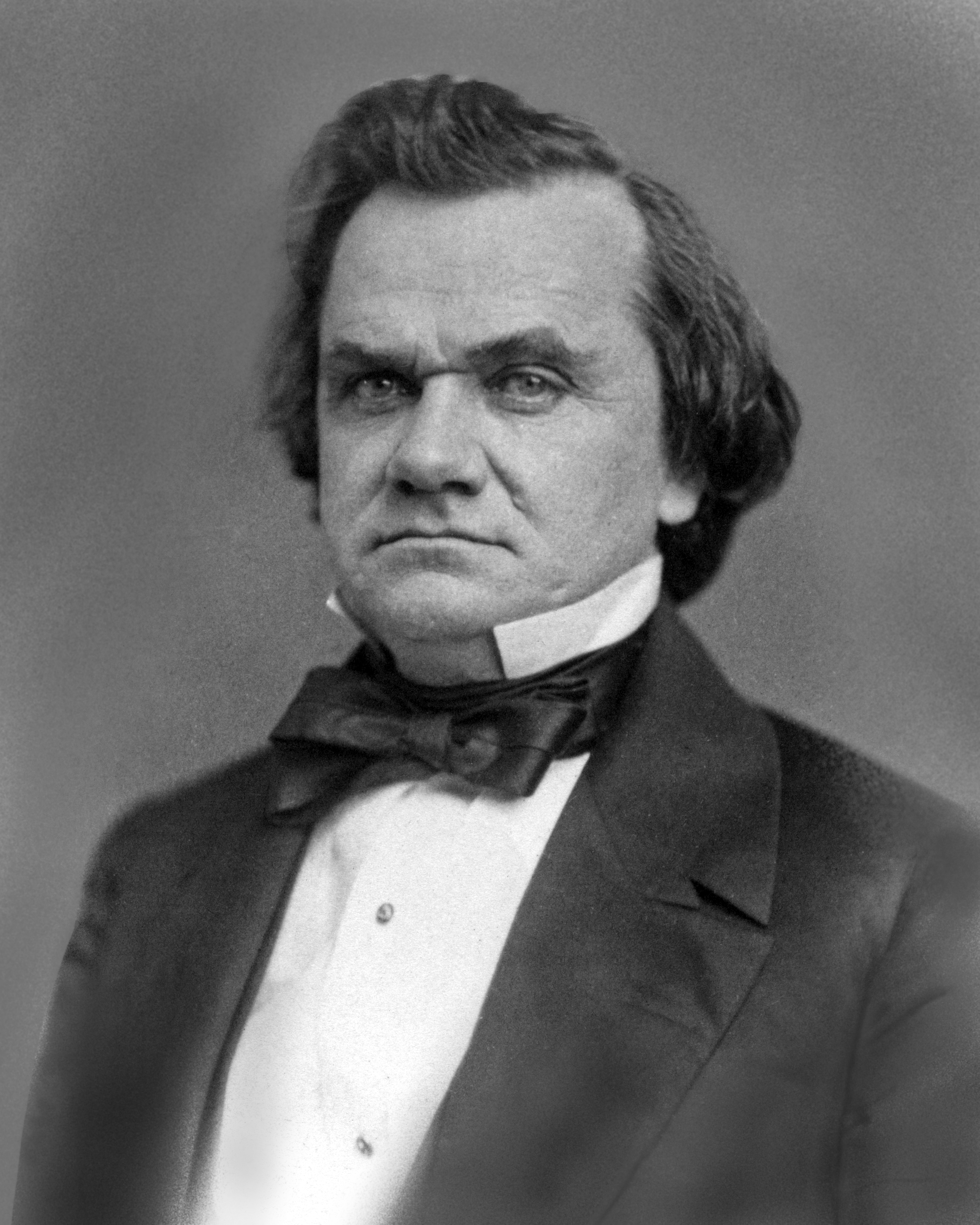

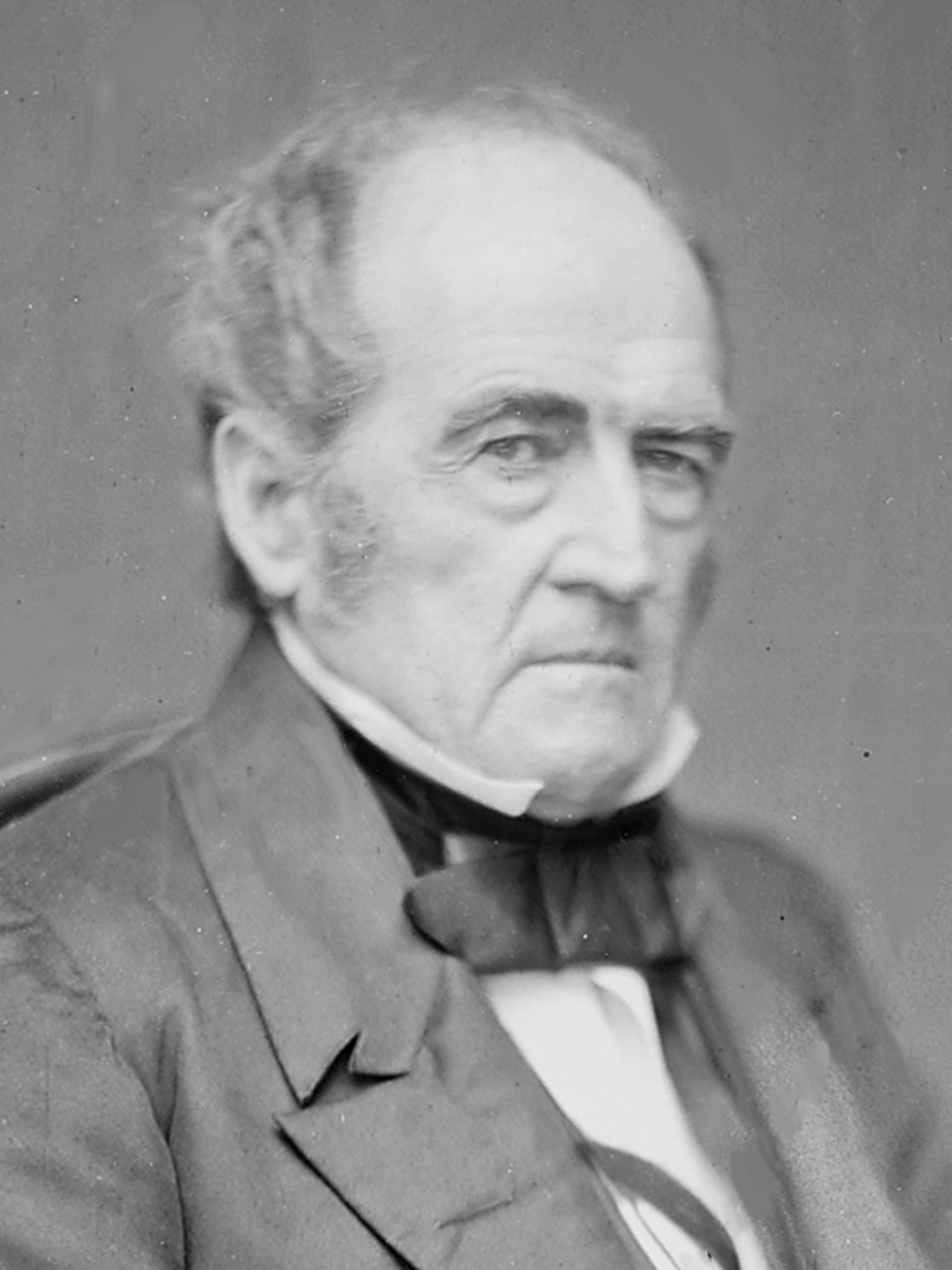

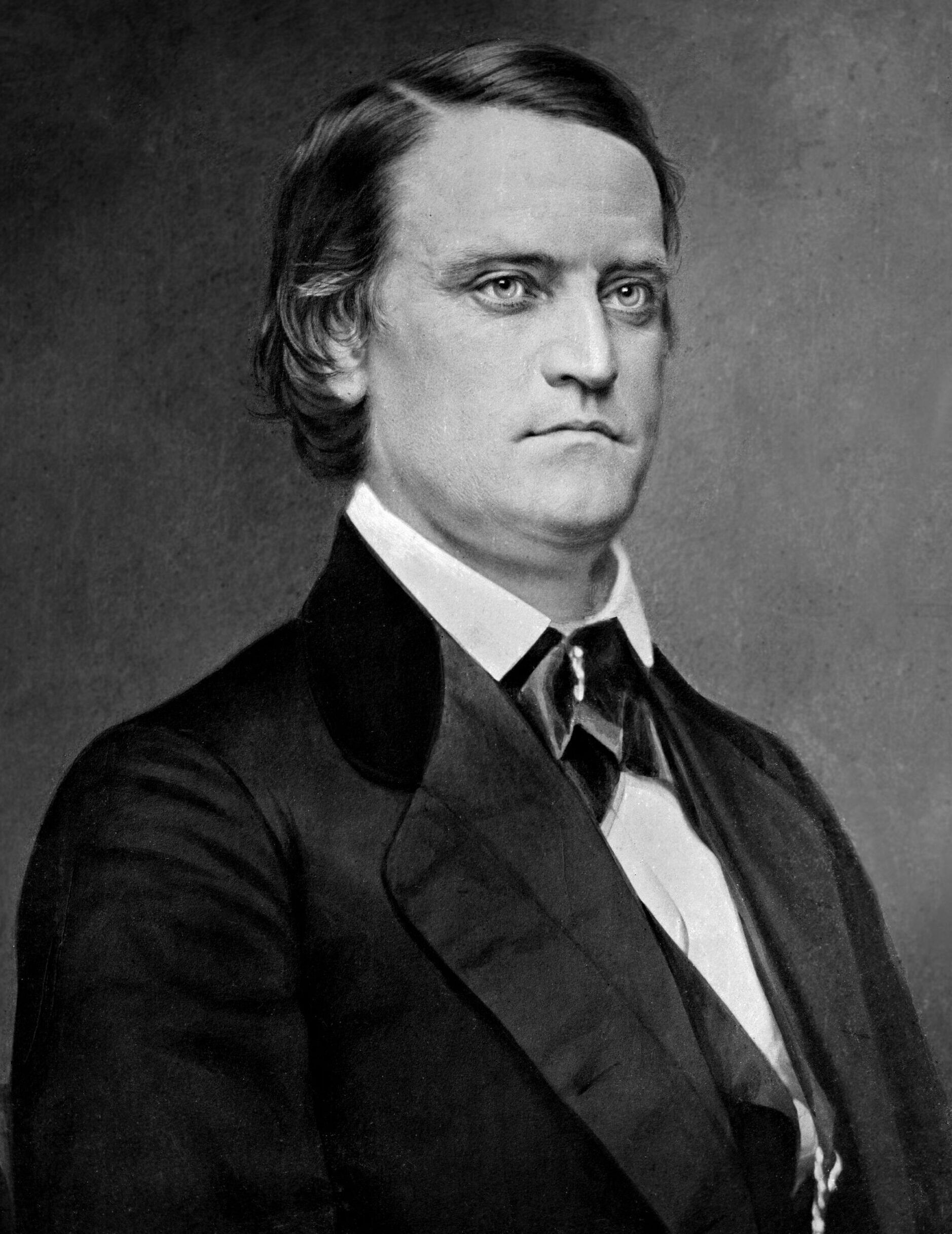
Nominee	Abraham Lincoln	Stephen Douglas (Dem); John Bell (CU); John C. Breckinridge (SD)
Party	Republican	Fusion
Alliance		Democratic; Constitutional Union; Southern Democratic
Home state	Illinois	Illinois (Douglas); Tennessee (Bell); Kentucky (Breckinridge)
Running mate	Hannibal Hamlin	Herschel V. Johnson (Dem); Edward Everett (CU); Joseph Lane (SD)
Electoral vote	35	0
Popular vote	353,804	305,101
Percentage	53.70%	46.30%
County results
Lincoln
50–60%
60–70%
70–80%
Fusion
50–60%
60–70%
70–80%
President before election
James Buchanan
Democratic
Elected President
Abraham Lincoln
Republican

The 1860 United States presidential election in New York took place on November 6, 1860, as part of the 1860 United States presidential election. Voters chose 35 electors of the Electoral College, who voted for president and vice president. New York was the tipping state in this election, and had Lincoln lost it there would have been a contingent election decided by Congress.

New York was won by Republican candidate Abraham Lincoln, who defeated the Democratic fusion ticket.

Lincoln won New York by a margin of 7.39 percentage points.

New York in the election was one of the four states that had a fusion ticket for the Democratic Party. The other three states were New Jersey, Pennsylvania and Rhode Island.

New York was home to a prominent Republican politician, William H. Seward who was widely expected to be nominated in the Republican Convention.

New York was key to the election; a Lincoln loss there would deadlock the Electoral College. Soon after his return from his Midwest tour, Seward embarked on another, speaking to large crowds across the state of New York. At his advisor Thurlow Weed's urging, he went to New York City and gave a patriotic speech before a large crowd on November 3, only three days before the election.

== Results ==
1860 United States presidential election in New York (Note: Since New York voted for presidential electors directly, the totals below are based on the highest elector on each ticket.)
Party	Candidate	Votes	Percentage	Electoral votes
Republican	Abraham Lincoln	353,804	53.70%	35
Fusion (Note: The slate of electors were pledged to 3 different candidates: 18 to Douglas, 10 to Bell, and 7 to Breckinridge.)	Stephen A. Douglas / John Bell / John C. Breckinridge	305,101	46.30%	0
Totals		658,905	100.00%	35

=== Results by county ===
County	Abraham Lincoln Republican		Stephen A. Douglas John Bell John C. Breckinridge Fusion		Margin		Total votes cast
County	#	%	#	%	#	%	Total votes cast
Albany	9,835	46.85%	11,158	53.15%	-1,323	-6.30%	20,993
Allegany	6,443	71.76%	2,535	28.24%	3,908	43.53%	8,978
Broome	4,554	61.31%	2,874	38.69%	1,680	22.62%	7,428
Cattaraugus	5,955	63.52%	3,420	36.48%	2,535	27.04%	9,375
Cayuga	7,922	66.69%	3,956	33.31%	3,966	33.39%	11,878
Chautauqua	8,481	69.80%	3,670	30.20%	4,811	39.59%	12,151
Chemung	2,949	54.35%	2,477	45.65%	472	8.70%	5,426
Chenango	5,685	60.63%	3,691	39.37%	1,994	21.27%	9,376
Clinton	3,961	54.76%	3,272	45.24%	689	9.53%	7,233
Columbia	5,108	51.97%	4,720	48.03%	388	3.95%	9,828
Cortland	3,893	69.46%	1,712	30.54%	2,181	38.91%	5,605
Delaware	5,001	59.83%	3,358	40.17%	1,643	19.66%	8,359
Dutchess	6,763	52.63%	6,086	47.37%	677	5.27%	12,849
Erie	12,430	53.29%	10,897	46.71%	1,533	6.57%	23,327
Essex	3,454	65.80%	1,795	34.20%	1,659	31.61%	5,249
Franklin	3,103	55.98%	2,440	44.02%	663	11.96%	5,543
Fulton (Note: Includes Hamilton County)	3,111	51.79%	2,896	48.21%	215	3.58%	6,007
Genesee	4,464	64.51%	2,456	35.49%	2,008	29.02%	6,920
Greene	3,137	47.00%	3,537	53.00%	-400	-5.99%	6,674
Herkimer	5,302	61.17%	3,366	38.83%	1,936	22.34%	8,668
Jefferson	8,796	61.35%	5,542	38.65%	3,254	22.69%	14,338
Kings	15,883	43.54%	20,599	56.46%	-4,716	-12.93%	36,482
Lewis	3,257	58.84%	2,278	41.16%	979	17.69%	5,535
Livingston	5,178	61.34%	3,264	38.66%	1,914	22.67%	8,442
Madison	6,289	66.15%	3,218	33.85%	3,071	32.30%	9,507
Monroe	10,808	59.69%	7,300	40.31%	3,508	19.37%	18,108
Montgomery	3,528	52.03%	3,253	47.97%	275	4.06%	6,781
New York	33,290	34.76%	62,482	65.24%	-29,192	-30.48%	95,772
Niagara	4,992	57.12%	3,748	42.88%	1,244	14.23%	8,740
Oneida	12,508	58.07%	9,031	41.93%	3,477	16.14%	21,539
Onondaga	11,243	60.77%	7,259	39.23%	3,984	21.53%	18,502
Ontario	5,764	61.27%	3,643	38.73%	2,121	22.55%	9,407
Orange (Note: The return from this county arrived too late to be included in the official state canvass.)	5,898	49.53%	6,011	50.47%	-113	-0.95%	11,909
Orleans	3,859	63.20%	2,247	36.80%	1,612	26.40%	6,106
Oswego	9,076	62.62%	5,418	37.38%	3,658	25.24%	14,494
Otsego	6,543	56.28%	5,082	43.72%	1,461	12.57%	11,625
Putnam	1,243	48.33%	1,329	51.67%	-86	-3.34%	2,572
Queens	3,749	46.06%	4,392	53.94%	-642	-7.89%	8,140
Rensselaer	8,464	49.92%	8,492	50.08%	-28	-0.17%	16,956
Richmond	1,408	37.27%	2,370	62.73%	-962	-25.46%	3,778
Rockland	1,410	37.32%	2,370	62.68%	-958	-25.36%	3,778
Saratoga	5,900	56.42%	4,557	43.58%	1,343	12.84%	10,457
Schenectady	2,154	51.89%	1,997	48.11%	157	3.78%	4,151
Schoharie	3,279	43.77%	4,212	56.23%	-933	-12.45%	7,491
Schuyler	2,551	59.88%	1,709	40.12%	842	19.77%	4,260
Seneca	3,025	50.23%	2,997	49.77%	28	0.46%	6,022
St. Lawrence	11,324	73.66%	4,049	26.34%	7,275	47.32%	15,373
Steuben	8,250	62.16%	5,023	37.84%	3,227	24.31%	13,273
Suffolk	3,756	51.61%	3,521	48.39%	235	3.23%	7,277
Sullivan	2,944	48.15%	3,170	51.85%	-226	-3.70%	6,114
Tioga	3,760	57.80%	2,745	42.20%	1,015	15.60%	6,505
Tompkins	4,348	58.96%	3,027	41.04%	1,321	17.91%	7,375
Ulster	6,775	52.05%	6,242	47.95%	523	4.09%	13,017
Warren	2,719	57.96%	1,972	42.04%	747	15.92%	4,691
Washington	6,173	63.91%	3,486	36.09%	2,687	27.82%	9,659
Wayne	6,668	62.85%	3,942	37.15%	2,726	25.69%	10,610
Westchester	6,771	45.45%	8,126	54.55%	-1,355	-9.10%	14,897
Wyoming	4,498	65.27%	2,393	34.73%	2,105	30.55%	6,891
Yates	3,014	67.17%	1,473	32.83%	1,541	34.34%	4,487
Totals (Note: Does not include the late arriving votes from Orange and Sullivan counties)	353,804	53.70%	305,101	46.30%	48,703	7.39%	658,905

=== New York City results ===
Results by ward (New York County)
Ward	Lincoln Republican		Fusion		Total
Ward	Votes	%	Votes	%	Votes
1	504	25.90%	1,442	74.10%	1,946
2	223	35.34%	408	64.66%	631
3	285	33.33%	570	66.67%	855
4	498	19.64%	2,037	80.36%	2,535
5	1,144	34.76%	2,147	65.24%	3,291
6	397	12.31%	2,827	87.69%	3,224
7	1,435	29.90%	3,365	70.10%	4,800
8	1,641	34.40%	3,130	65.60%	4,771
9	2,944	42.67%	3,956	57.33%	6,900
10	1,463	40.03%	2,192	59.97%	3,655
11	1,943	31.51%	4,224	68.49%	6,167
12	991	32.40%	2,068	67.60%	3,059
13	1,347	36.43%	2,351	63.57%	3,698
14	748	20.91%	2,830	79.09%	3,578
15	1,737	40.73%	2,528	59.27%	4,265
16	2,473	41.98%	3,418	58.02%	5,891
17	2,975	34.33%	5,690	65.67%	8,665
18	2,130	33.43%	4,242	66.57%	6,372
19	1,180	38.92%	1,852	61.08%	3,032
20	2,822	39.15%	4,386	60.85%	7,208
21	2,269	38.69%	3,596	61.31%	5,865
22	2,141	41.33%	3,039	58.67%	5,180
Totals	33,290	34.83%	62,298	65.17%	95,588

==== Counties that flipped from Democratic to Republican ====
- Erie
- Franklin

==== Counties that flipped from American to Republican ====
- Ulster

==== Counties that flipped from Republican to Democratic ====
- Orange
- Rensselaer

==== Counties that flipped from American to Democratic ====
- Queens
- Sullivans

== See also ==
- United States presidential elections in New York
