= 1860 United States presidential election in New Jersey =

- November 6, 1860
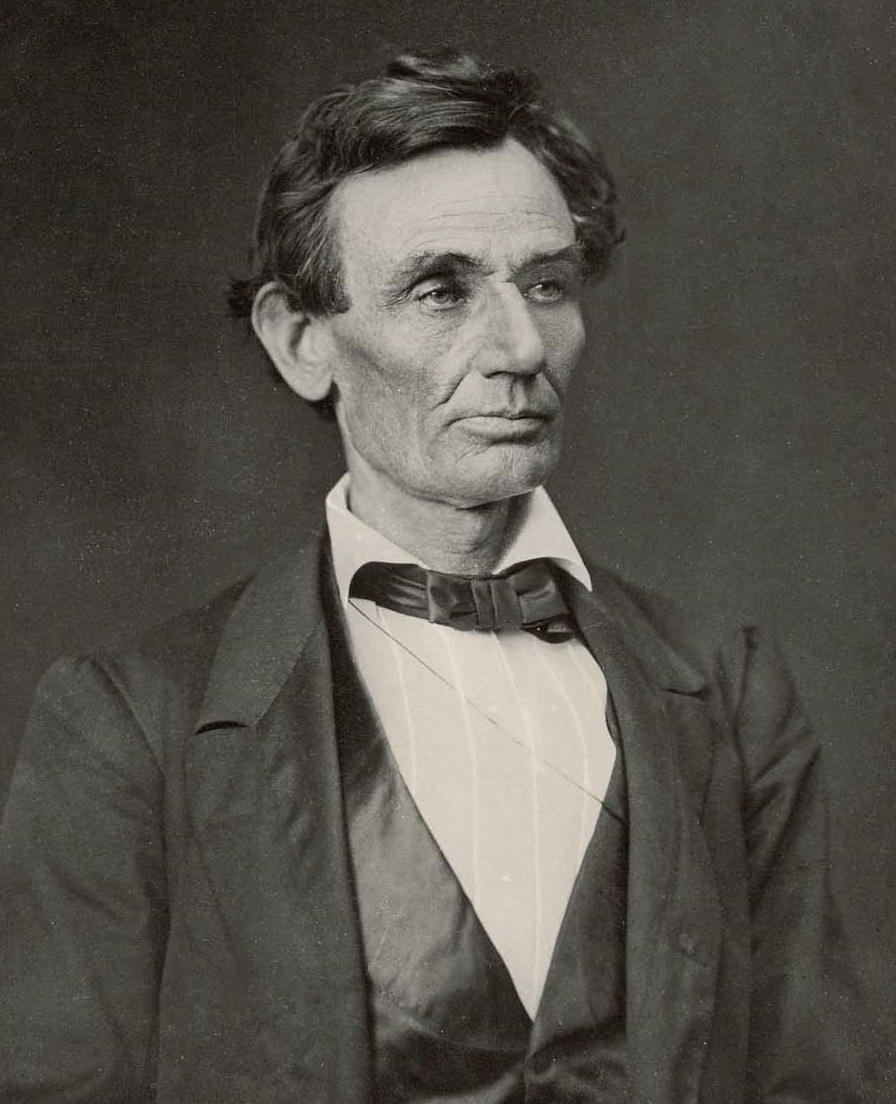

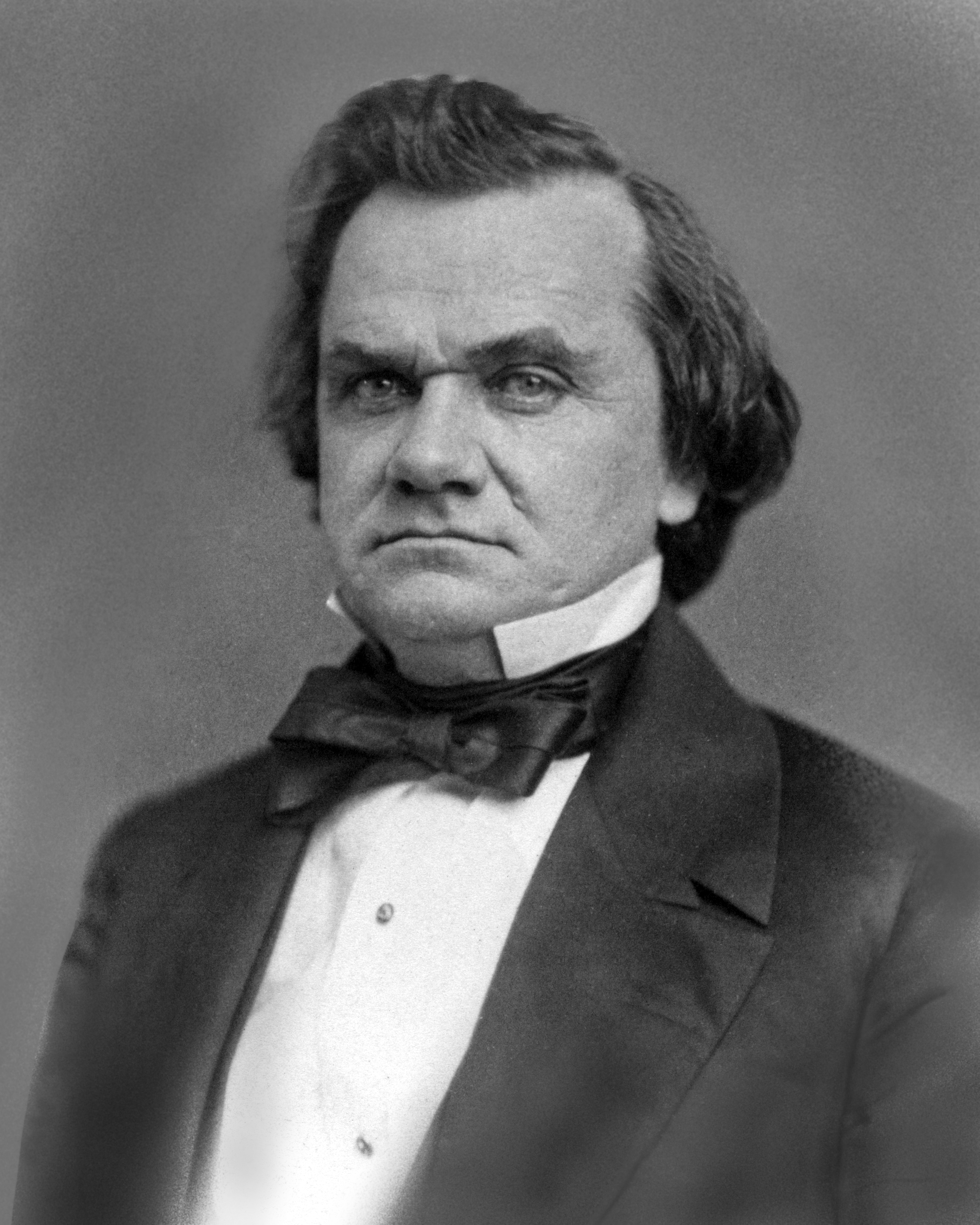

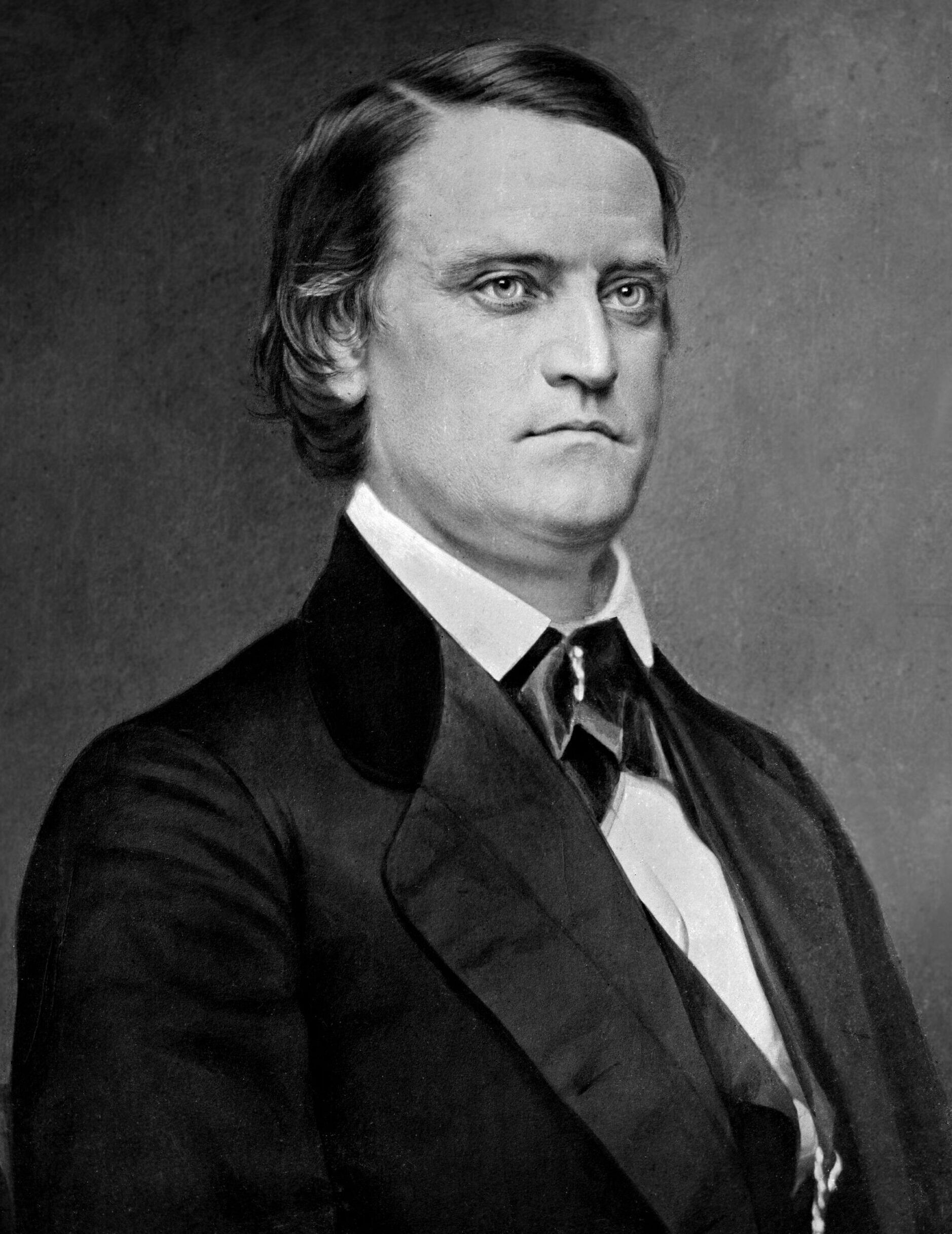

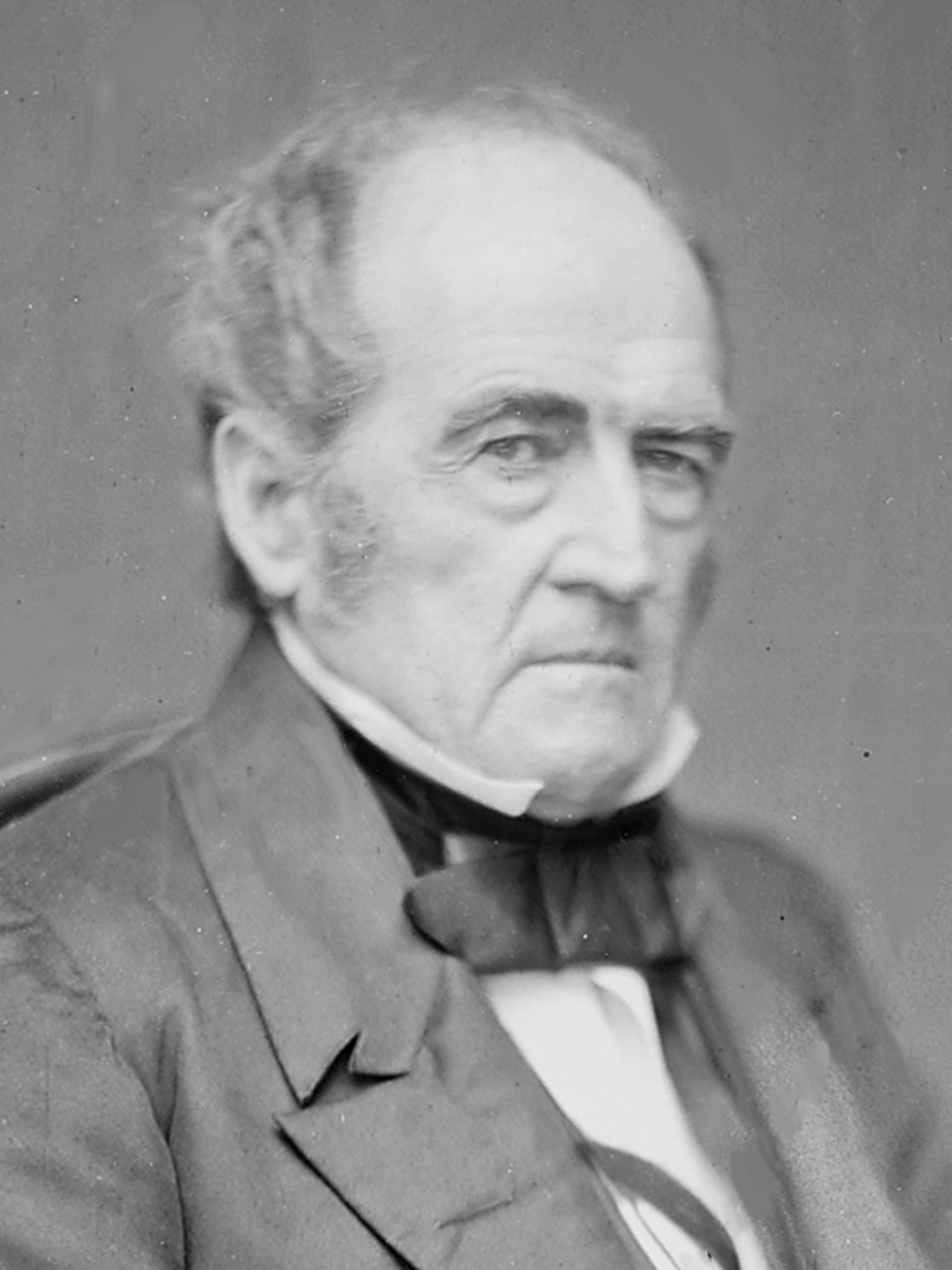
Nominee	Abraham Lincoln	Stephen Douglas (Dem); John C. Breckinridge (SD); John Bell (CU)
Party	Republican	Fusion
Alliance		Democratic; Southern Democratic; Constitutional Union
Home state	Illinois	Illinois (Douglas); Kentucky (Breckinridge); Tennessee (Bell)
Running mate	Hannibal Hamlin	Herschel V. Johnson (Dem); Joseph Lane (SD); Edward Everett (CU)
Electoral vote	4	3 (Note: The three fusion electors voted for Douglas for president and Johnson for vice president.)
Popular vote	58,345	62,801
Percentage	48.13%	51.87%

Lincoln
50–60%
60–70%
Fusion
50–60%
60–70%
President before election
James Buchanan
Democratic
Elected President
Abraham Lincoln
Republican

The 1860 United States presidential election in New Jersey took place on November 6, 1860, as part of the 1860 United States presidential election. Voters in New Jersey chose seven electors of the Electoral College, who voted for President and Vice President. New Jersey voters voted for each elector individually, and thus could split their votes. All seven electors were chosen in a single at-large election. That is, each voter voted for up to seven candidates, and the seven candidates with highest vote counts were elected.

== Results ==
1860 United States presidential election in New Jersey (Note: The fusion ticket included three Douglas electors (Cook, Parker, Runyon), two Breckenridge electors (Vroom, Wurts), and two Bell electors (Brewer, Condit). Additionally, outside the fusion ticket, five Douglas electors (Abraham W. Nash, Moses Wills, Joseph Vliet, Daniel S. Anderson, Thomas N. McCarter), five Bell electors (Charles G. McChesney, John T. Woodhull, Cornelius Boice, John V. Brown, William K. McDonald), and two Breckenridge electors (John S. Darcy, Peter I. Clark) received votes.)
Party	Candidate elector	Votes
Republican	J. C. Hornblower	58,345
Republican	Edward W. Ivins	58,341
Republican	George H. Brown	58,335
Republican	Charles E. Elmer	58,334
Republican	Isaac W. Scudder	58,323
Republican	David Thompson	58,322
Republican	Andrew K. Hay	58,315
Fusion	William Cook	62,801
Fusion	Joel Parker	62,387
Fusion	Theodore Runyon	62,309
Fusion	Peter D. Vroom	58,210
Fusion	Edmund Brewer	57,801
Fusion	Silas Condit	57,553
Fusion	Alexander Wurts	56,182

=== Results By County ===
1860 United States Presidential Election in New Jersey (By County)
County	Stephen A. Douglas/ John C. Breckinridge/ John Bell Fusion		Abraham Lincoln Republican		Total votes cast
County	#	%	#	%	Total votes cast
Atlantic	794	41.72%	1,109	58.28%	1,903
Bergen	2,092	59.01%	1,453	40.99%	3,545
Burlington	4,036	43.37%	5,269	56.63%	9,305
Camden	2,643	51.56%	2,483	48.44%	5,126
Cape May	520	43.33%	680	56.67%	1,200
Cumberland	1,630	41.42%	2,305	58.58%	3,935
Essex	9,711	52.43%	8,812	47.57%	18,523
Gloucester	1,476	43.04%	1,953	56.96%	3,429
Hudson	5,150	59.60%	3,491	40.40%	8,641
Hunterdon	3,934	58.19%	2,827	41.81%	6,761
Mercer	3,423	48.22%	3,675	51.78%	7,098
Middlesex	3,605	55.22%	2,924	44.78%	6,529
Monmouth	4,089	56.91%	3,096	43.09%	7,185
Morris	3,312	48.73%	3,484	51.27%	6,796
Ocean	701	33.40%	1,398	66.60%	2,099
Passaic	2,415	46.18%	2,814	53.82%	5,229
Salem	1,973	46.99%	2,226	53.01%	4,199
Somerset	2,297	53.72%	1,979	46.28%	4,276
Sussex	3,087	63.58%	1,768	36.42%	4,855
Union	2,756	55.64%	2,197	44.36%	4,953
Warren	3,225	57.32%	2,401	42.68%	5,626
Total	62,869	51.87%	58,344	48.13%	121,213

== Analysis ==
The state's seven electoral votes were split, with Republican candidate Abraham Lincoln getting four, while Democrat Stephen A. Douglas won 3. That was because the Democratic electors were part of a fusion ticket between the regular Democrats, supporting Douglas, breakaway Democrats, supporting John C. Breckinridge, and the Constitutional Union Party, former Whigs supporting John Bell.

The fusion ticket was formed because none of the three factions thought that it could defeat the Republicans separately, but their combined votes could do so, and then, each group would get some electoral votes. Several different slates were proposed. The final fusion ticket consisted of three electors pledged to Douglas, two pledged to Breckinridge, and two pledged to Bell.

However, many Douglas Democrats resented the concession to the Breckinridge and Bell factions and believed that the Breckinridge and Bell voters were much fewer and that Douglas could carry the state if all opponents of Lincoln supported him. That group formed a slate of seven Douglas Democrats, which included the three on the fusion ticket.

At the time, election authorities did not issue pre-printed ballots with all candidates' names, to be marked by voters. Instead, each voter wrote his votes down on a piece of paper or used a pre-printed ballot distributed by a political party or faction that had only the names of that group's candidates. The voter could modify a pre-printed ballot by crossing off or writing over one or more of the printed names. The state Democrats issued a pre-printed ballot with the seven fusion candidates; the dissident Democrats issued a ballot with the all-Douglas slate.

In the election, about 58,200 fusion ticket ballots were cast, about 4,600 straight-Democrat ballots, and about 58,300 Republican ballots. The exact numbers cannot be determined, as some voters altered their pre-printed ballots or cast hand-written ballots. It appears that the names of some of the Breckinridge or Bell electors were crossed off or replaced by 400 to 2,000 fusion-ticket voters. The three Douglas candidates who were on both the fusion and straight-Democrat tickets got over 62,000 votes, the seven Republican candidates all got about 58,300 votes, and the four non-Douglas candidates on the fusion ticket got 58,200 or less. Thus, three Douglas candidates and four Lincoln candidates were elected.

New Jersey was one of four states in 1860 on which the Democrats formed a fusion ticket. The other three states were New York, Pennsylvania, and Rhode Island. This is the only time a Republican won the election without Cape May County.

== See also ==
- United States presidential elections in New Jersey

Elected electors names in boldface. Fusion electors Cook, Parker, and Runyon were pledged to Douglas and voted for him.
