= 1860 United States presidential election in Virginia =

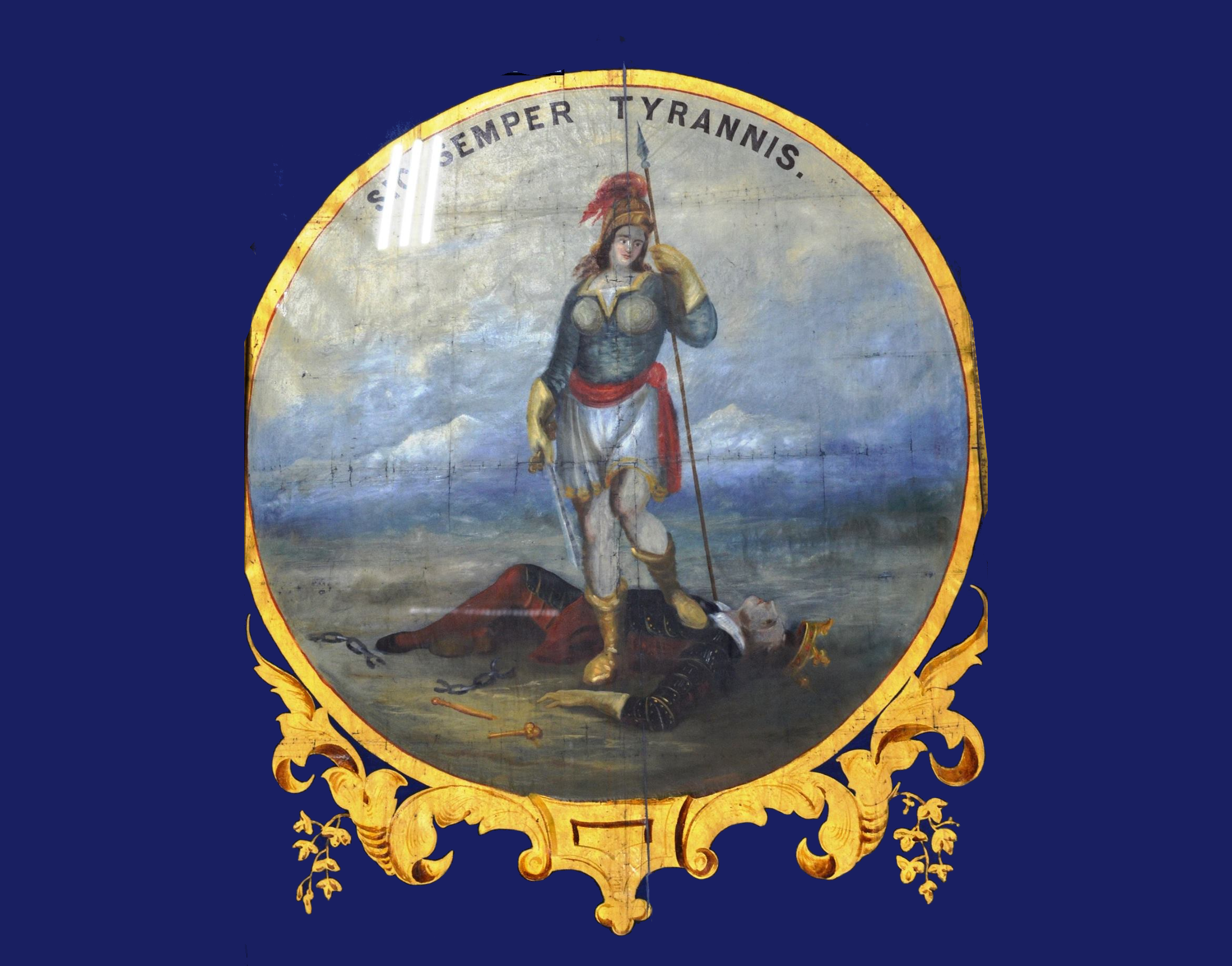
- November 6, 1860
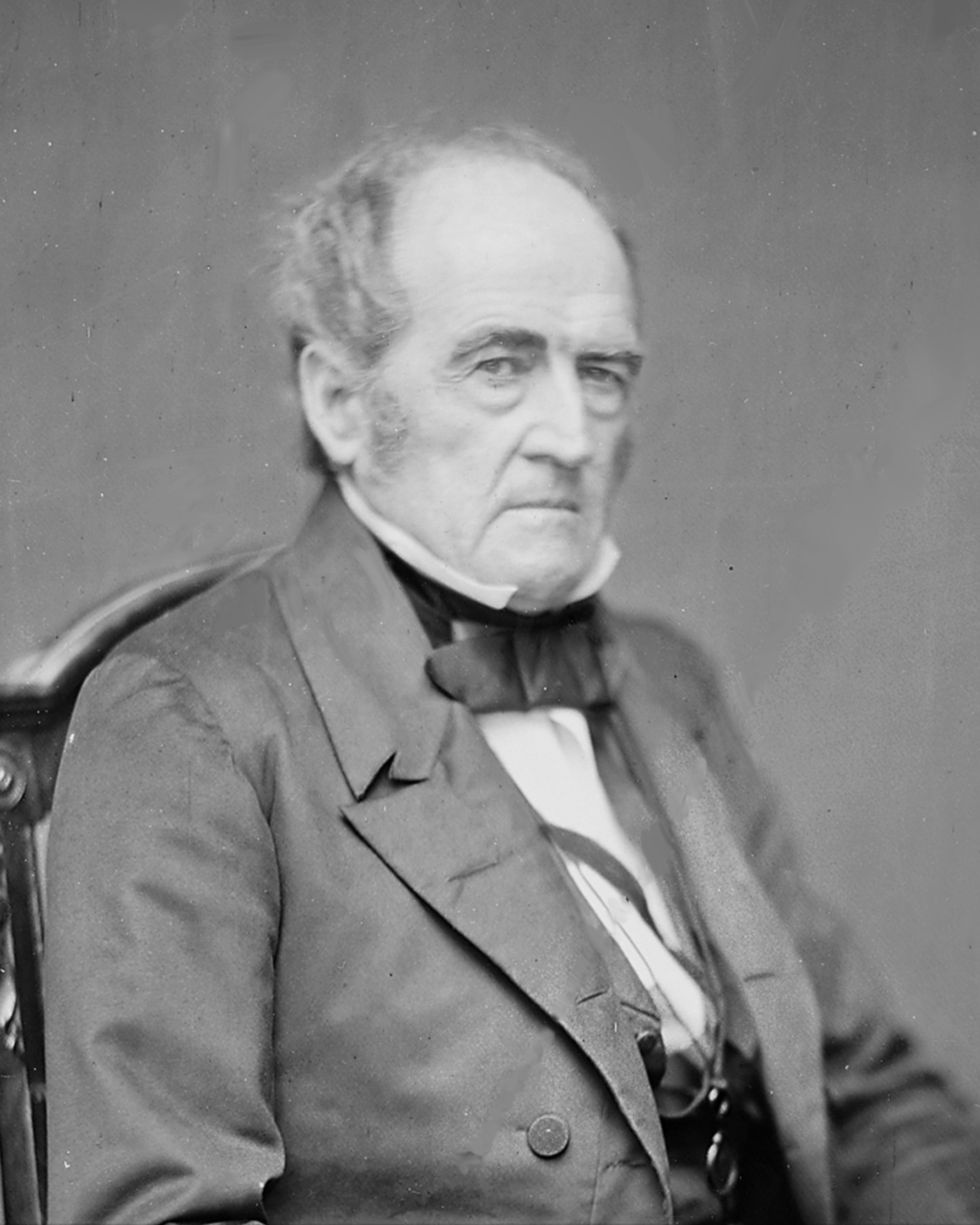

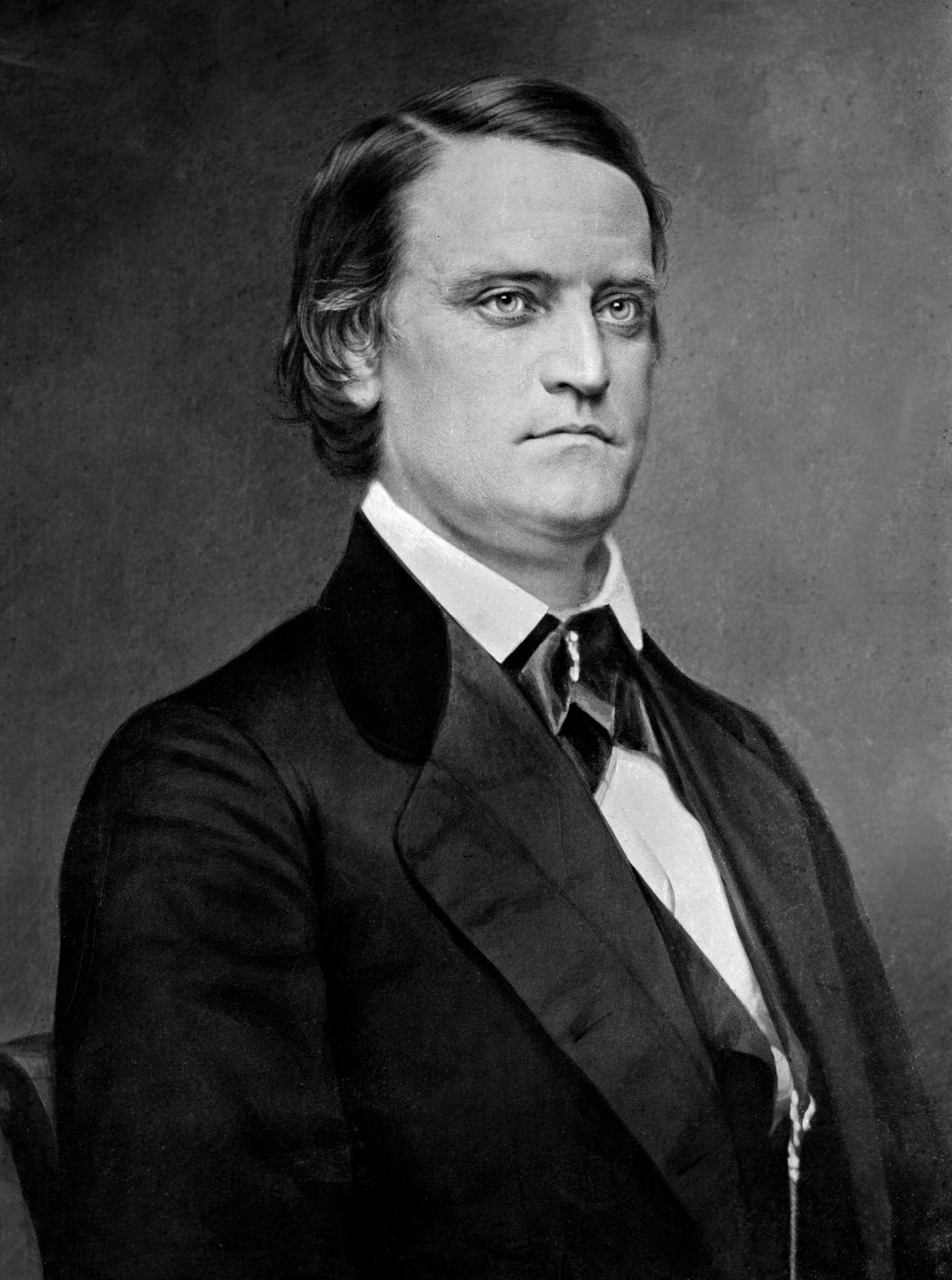

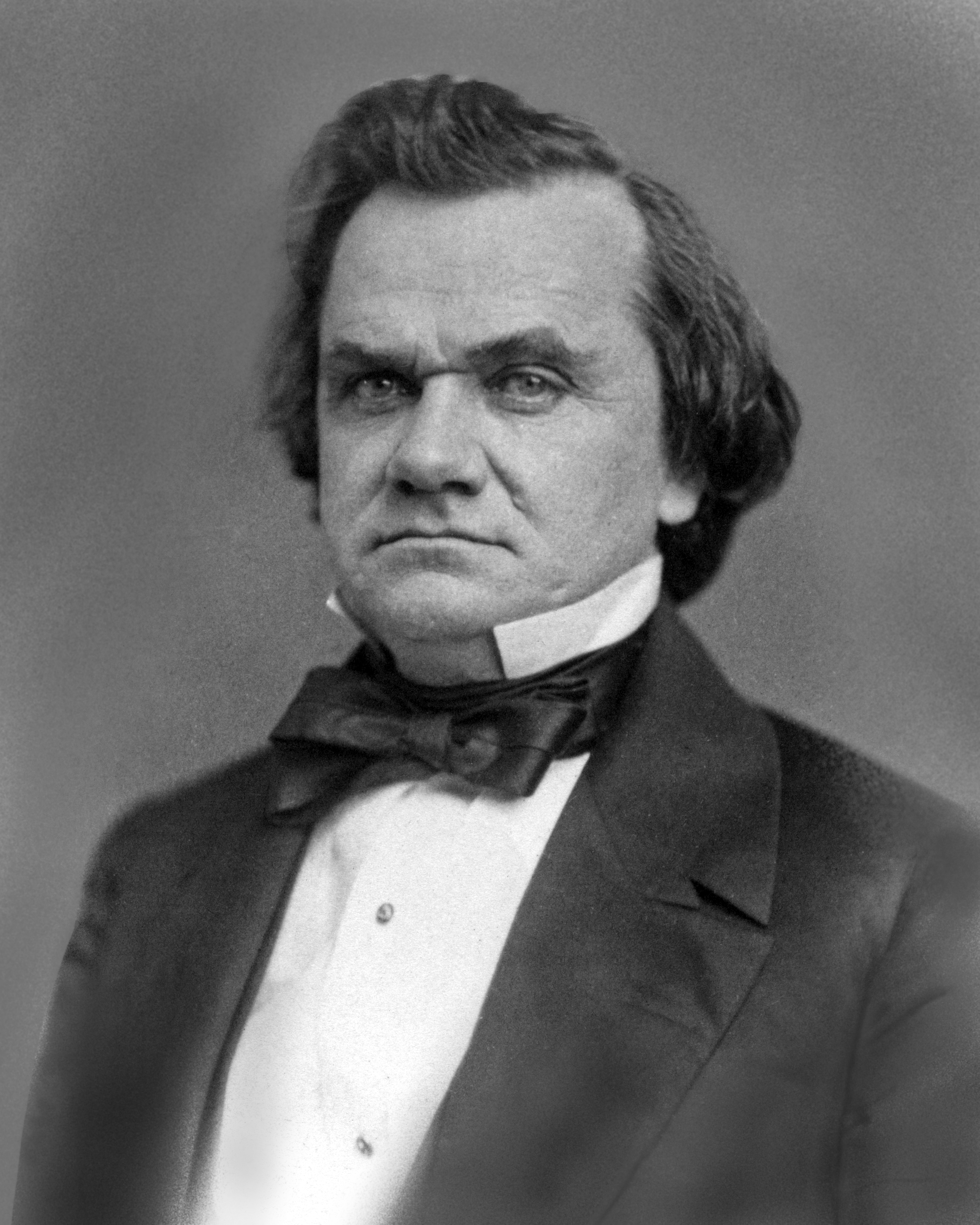
Nominee	John Bell	John C. Breckinridge	Stephen A. Douglas
Party	Constitutional Union	Southern Democratic	Northern Democratic
Home state	Tennessee	Kentucky	Illinois
Running mate	Edward Everett	Joseph Lane	Herschel V. Johnson
Electoral vote	15	0	0
Popular vote	74,481	74,325	16,198
Percentage	44.63%	44.54%	9.71%

Bell
30–40%
40–50%
50–60%
60–70%
70–80%
Breckinridge
30–40%
40–50%
50–60%
60–70%
70–80%
80–90%
90–100%
Douglas
30–40%
40–50%
Tie
40–50%
President before election
James Buchanan
Democratic
Elected President
Abraham Lincoln
Republican

The 1860 United States presidential election in Virginia took place on November 6, 1860, as part of the 1860 United States presidential election. Voters chose 15 representatives, or electors to the Electoral College, who voted for president and vice president.

== Campaign ==
Archibald Campbell and John Curtiss Underwood attempted to have the Republican National Convention held in Wheeling, Virginia. Many national Republicans supported the idea, including chair Edwin D. Morgan. However, the hostile reaction to the Republican Party by the south after John Brown's raid on Harpers Ferry resulted in the committee choosing to host the convention in Chicago.

1,500 people attended the Republican Party of Virginia's state convention in Wheeling on May 2, 1860. The party's delegation to the national convention was the sixth-largest there, despite a credentials challenge against the entire south by opponents of William H. Seward. The initially pro-Seward Virginia delegation gave a majority of its votes to Abraham Lincoln on the first ballot. The delegation supported Cassius Marcellus Clay for the vice presidential nomination.

Four companies of Wide Awakes totaling 350 men were formed during the campaign. Almost all of Lincoln's support came from around Wheeling and his largest number of votes came from Ohio County.

== Results ==
1860 United States presidential election in Virginia
Party	Candidate	Votes	Percentage	Electoral votes
Constitutional Union	John Bell	74,481	44.63%	15
Southern Democratic	John C. Breckinridge	74,325	44.54%	0
Northern Democratic	Stephen A. Douglas	16,198	9.71%	0
Republican	Abraham Lincoln	1,887	1.13%	0
Totals		166,891	100.0%	15

=== Results by county ===
1860 United States Presidential Election in Virginia (by county)
County	John Bell Constitutional Union		John C. Breckinridge Southern Democratic		Stephen A. Douglas Northern Democratic		Abraham Lincoln Republican		Total votes cast
County	#	%	#	%	#	%	#	%	Total votes cast
Accomack	736	47.39%	737	47.46%	80	5.15%	0	0.00%	1,553
Albemarle	1,317	53.32%	1,056	42.75%	97	3.93%	0	0.00%	2,470
Alexandria	1,012	58.36%	565	32.58%	141	8.13%	16	0.92%	1,734
Alleghany	250	39.62%	344	54.52%	37	5.86%	0	0.00%	631
Amelia	282	50.09%	249	44.23%	32	5.68%	0	0.00%	563
Amherst	622	42.72%	808	55.49%	26	1.79%	0	0.00%	1,456
Appomattox	221	27.83%	563	70.91%	10	1.26%	0	0.00%	794
Augusta	2,553	66.05%	218	5.64%	1,094	28.31%	0	0.00%	3,865
Barbour	422	30.71%	910	66.23%	39	2.84%	3	0.22%	1,374
Bath	220	45.32%	163	40.25%	22	5.43%	0	0.00%	405
Bedford	1,468	56.55%	1,037	39.95%	91	3.50%	0	0.00%	2,596
Berkeley	913	49.38%	830	44.89%	106	5.73%	0	0.00%	1,849
Boone	121	34.67%	204	58.45%	24	6.88%	0	0.00%	349
Botetourt	590	43.61%	589	43.53%	174	12.86%	0	0.00%	1,353
Braxton	274	50.09%	227	41.50%	46	8.41%	0	0.00%	547
Brooke	173	19.84%	450	51.61%	76	8.72%	173	19.84%	872
Brunswick	308	32.90%	444	46.28%	187	19.91%	0	0.00%	939
Buchanan	14	8.38%	134	80.24%	19	11.38%	0	0.00%	167
Buckingham	545	50.00%	523	47.98%	22	2.02%	0	0.00%	1,090
Cabell	316	35.59%	161	18.13%	407	45.83%	4	0.45%	888
Calhoun	19	6.23%	285	93.44%	1	0.32%	0	0.00%	305
Campbell	1,521	52.90%	1,208	42.02%	146	5.08%	0	0.00%	2,875
Caroline	561	41.52%	772	57.14%	18	1.33%	0	0.00%	1,351
Carroll	315	29.86%	729	69.10%	11	1.04%	0	0.00%	1,055
Charles City	224	65.12%	111	32.26%	9	2.62%	0	0.00%	344
Charlotte	418	46.04%	465	51.21%	25	2.75%	0	0.00%	908
Chesterfield	788	46.24%	328	19.25%	588	34.51%	0	0.00%	1,704
Clarke	288	42.86%	335	49.85%	49	7.29%	0	0.00%	672
Clay	119	76.28%	37	23.72%	0	0.00%	0	0.00%	156
Craig	112	25.69%	322	73.85%	2	0.46%	0	0.00%	436
Culpeper	526	49.16%	525	49.07%	19	1.78%	0	0.00%	1,070
Cumberland	278	47.04%	276	46.70%	37	6.26%	0	0.00%	591
Dinwiddie	389	47.09%	254	30.75%	183	22.16%	0	0.00%	826
Doddridge	143	24.20%	356	60.24%	91	15.40%	1	0.16%	591
Elizabeth City	248	56.88%	164	37.61%	24	5.51%	0	0.00%	436
Essex	279	47.21%	308	52.11%	4	0.68%	0	0.00%	591
Fairfax	691	47.10%	685	46.69%	91	6.20%	0	0.00%	1,491
Fauquier	989	48.13%	1,027	49.98%	39	1.90%	0	0.00%	2,056
Fayette	381	55.46%	241	35.08%	65	9.46%	0	0.00%	687
Floyd	384	46.83%	400	48.78%	36	4.39%	0	0.00%	820
Fluvanna	487	51.97%	443	47.28%	7	0.72%	0	0.00%	937
Franklin	863	41.65%	1,076	51.93%	133	6.42%	0	0.00%	2,072
Frederick	963	41.08%	1,315	56.10%	66	2.82%	0	0.00%	2,344
Giles	366	54.46%	244	36.31%	62	9.23%	0	0.00%	672
Gilmer	117	28.40%	268	65.05%	27	6.55%	0	0.00%	412
Gloucester	301	39.55%	460	60.45%	0	0.00%	0	0.00%	761
Goochland	244	34.41%	428	60.37%	37	5.22%	0	0.00%	709
Grayson	315	40.49%	447	57.46%	16	2.05%	0	0.00%	762
Greenbrier	993	60.88%	505	30.96%	133	8.15%	0	0.00%	1,631
Greene	74	12.23%	521	86.12%	10	1.65%	0	0.00%	605
Greensville	139	41.99%	151	45.62%	41	12.39%	0	0.00%	331
Halifax	563	27.97%	1,312	65.18%	138	6.86%	0	0.00%	2,013
Hampshire	878	43.37%	1,054	52.49%	75	3.74%	1	0.04%	2,008
Hancock	33	5.29%	262	41.32%	85	13.42%	254	40.06%	634
Hanover	575	42.56%	749	55.44%	27	2.00%	0	0.00%	1,351
Hardy	894	67.57%	355	26.83%	74	5.60%	0	0.00%	1,323
Harrison	931	41.36%	1,191	52.91%	107	4.75%	22	0.98%	2,251
Henrico	1,403	62.83%	641	28.71%	189	8.46%	0	0.00%	2,233
Henry	543	51.91%	444	44.45%	59	5.64%	0	0.00%	1,046
Highland	215	33.59%	170	26.56%	255	39.84%	0	0.00%	640
Isle of Wight	147	15.93%	757	82.02%	19	2.05%	0	0.00%	923
Jackson	388	39.88%	500	51.39%	64	6.58%	21	2.16%	973
James City	148	69.48%	60	28.17%	5	2.35%	0	0.00%	213
Jefferson	959	51.64%	458	24.66%	440	23.69%	0	0.00%	1,857
Kanawha	1,176	67.55%	513	29.47%	52	2.99%	0	0.00%	1,741
King and Queen	255	33.25%	510	66.49%	2	0.26%	0	0.00%	767
King George	184	41.44%	223	50.23%	37	8.33%	0	0.00%	444
King William	142	30.54%	315	67.74%	8	1.72%	0	0.00%	465
Lancaster	209	57.58%	142	39.12%	12	3.31%	0	0.00%	363
Lee	462	33.82%	894	65.45%	10	0.73%	0	0.00%	1,366
Lewis	332	28.06%	604	51.06%	247	20.88%	0	0.00%	1,183
Logan	100	26.53%	271	71.88%	6	1.59%	0	0.00%	377
Loudoun	2,033	69.10%	778	26.44%	120	4.08%	11	0.37%	2,942
Louisa	498	39.71%	754	60.13%	2	0.16%	0	0.00%	1,254
Lunenburg	251	30.99%	527	65.06%	32	3.95%	0	0.00%	810
McDowell	35	48.61%	37	51.39%	0	0.00%	0	0.00%	72
Madison	74	7.97%	834	89.87%	20	2.16%	0	0.00%	928
Marion	569	27.84%	1,337	65.41%	137	6.70%	1	0.01%	2,044
Marshall	928	45.49%	809	39.66%	108	5.29%	195	9.56%	2,040
Mason	716	47.39%	439	29.05%	297	19.66%	59	3.90%	1,511
Mathews	251	45.06%	306	54.94%	0	0.00%	0	0.00%	557
Mecklenburg	430	30.85%	901	64.63%	63	4.52%	0	0.00%	1,394
Mercer	443	49.89%	432	48.65%	13	1.46%	0	0.00%	888
Middlesex	151	38.52%	241	61.48%	0	0.00%	0	0.00%	392
Monongalia	622	30.24%	601	29.22%	757	36.80%	77	3.74%	2,057
Monroe	693	53.47%	520	40.12%	83	6.40%	0	0.00%	1,296
Montgomery	712	58.79%	425	35.09%	74	6.11%	0	0.00%	1,211
Morgan	308	52.92%	254	43.62%	20	3.44%	0	0.00%	582
Nansemond	477	52.59%	429	47.30%	1	0.11%	0	0.00%	907
Nelson	733	59.35%	390	31.58%	112	9.07%	0	0.00%	1,235
New Kent	264	60.27%	172	39.27%	2	0.46%	0	0.00%	438
Nicholas	345	63.03%	152	27.89%	48	8.81%	0	0.00%	545
Norfolk City	982	59.38%	439	26.54%	233	14.09%	0	0.00%	1,654
Norfolk County	704	58.52%	447	37.16%	52	4.32%	0	0.00%	1,203
Northampton	234	51.54%	214	47.14%	6	1.32%	0	0.00%	454
Northumberland	276	44.02%	350	55.82%	1	0.16%	0	0.00%	627
Nottoway	232	52.85%	179	40.77%	28	6.39%	0	0.00%	439
Ohio	1,202	33.43%	915	25.39%	716	19.87%	771	21.39%	3,604
Orange	427	46.72%	475	51.97%	12	1.31%	0	0.00%	914
Page	141	12.23%	937	81.27%	75	6.50%	0	0.00%	1,153
Patrick	433	46.31%	432	46.20%	70	7.49%	0	0.00%	935
Pendleton	400	53.33%	217	28.93%	133	17.73%	0	0.00%	750
Petersburg	970	53.71%	223	12.35%	613	33.94%	0	0.00%	1,806
Pittsylvania	1,702	57.98%	1,057	36.00%	177	6.01%	0	0.00%	2,936
Pleasants	140	32.94%	166	39.06%	119	28.00%	0	0.00%	425
Pocahontas	163	30.99%	333	63.31%	30	5.70%	0	0.00%	526
Portsmouth	678	46.60%	559	38.42%	214	14.72%	4	0.27%	1,455
Powhatan	225	47.67%	127	26.91%	120	25.42%	0	0.00%	472
Preston	562	30.33%	942	50.84%	239	12.90%	110	5.94%	1,853
Prince Edward	374	43.39%	423	49.07%	65	7.54%	0	0.00%	862
Prince George	243	43.39%	191	34.11%	126	22.50%	0	0.00%	560
Princess Anne	451	53.31%	379	44.80%	16	1.89%	0	0.00%	846
Prince William	243	23.32%	718	68.91%	26	2.50%	55	5.28%	1,042
Pulaski	332	56.56%	250	42.59%	5	0.85%	0	0.00%	587
Putnam	400	52.29%	327	42.75%	38	4.97%	0	0.00%	765
Raleigh	230	73.48%	69	22.04%	14	4.47%	0	0.00%	313
Randolph	259	39.85%	248	38.15%	143	22.00%	0	0.00%	650
Rappahannock	491	52.85%	409	44.03%	29	3.12%	0	0.00%	929
Richmond City	2,402	55.58%	1,167	27.08%	753	17.42%	0	0.00%	4,322
Richmond County	353	64.89%	185	34.01%	6	1.10%	0	0.00%	544
Ritchie	224	26.26%	544	63.77%	73	8.56%	12	1.41%	853
Roane	237	45.84%	264	51.06%	16	3.09%	0	0.00%	517
Roanoke	293	40.81%	373	51.95%	52	7.24%	0	0.00%	718
Rockbridge	1,231	55.13%	361	16.17%	641	28.71%	0	0.00%	2,233
Rockingham	883	30.31%	676	23.21%	1,354	46.48%	0	0.00%	2,913
Russell	473	47.35%	526	52.65%	0	0.00%	0	0.00%	999
Scott	491	41.75%	594	50.60%	91	7.74%	0	0.00%	1,176
Shenandoah	427	17.13%	1,883	75.53%	170	6.82%	13	0.52%	2,493
Smyth	446	45.01%	496	50.05%	49	4.94%	0	0.00%	991
Southampton	545	48.79%	563	50.40%	9	0.81%	0	0.00%	1,117
Spotsylvania	599	43.66%	516	37.61%	257	18.73%	0	0.00%	1,372
Stafford	404	41.61%	402	41.41%	165	16.99%	0	0.00%	971
Surry	197	53.68%	115	31.34%	55	14.99%	0	0.00%	367
Sussex	177	31.22%	294	51.85%	96	16.93%	0	0.00%	567
Taylor	647	51.68%	575	45.93%	26	2.08%	4	0.32%	1,252
Tazewell	306	24.68%	934	75.32%	0	0.00%	0	0.00%	1,240
Tucker	22	15.28%	99	68.75%	23	15.97%	0	0.00%	144
Tyler	315	33.69%	423	45.24%	197	21.07%	0	0.00%	935
Upshur	331	33.98%	589	60.47%	54	5.54%	0	0.00%	974
Warren	276	36.80%	462	61.60%	12	1.60%	0	0.00%	750
Warwick	72	69.23%	32	30.77%	0	0.00%	0	0.00%	104
Washington	916	42.60%	1,178	54.79%	56	2.60%	0	0.00%	2,150
Wayne	326	56.82%	166	28.42%	82	14.04%	10	1.71%	584
Webster	86	45.03%	96	50.26%	9	4.71%	0	0.00%	191
Westmoreland	438	72.76%	160	26.58%	4	0.66%	0	0.00%	602
Wetzel	90	10.51%	607	70.91%	153	17.87%	6	0.70%	856
Williamsburg	49	42.24%	43	37.07%	24	20.69%	0	0.00%	116
Wirt	150	35.63%	255	60.57%	16	3.80%	0	0.00%	421
Wise	102	21.56%	363	76.74%	8	1.69%	0	0.00%	473
Wood	832	46.20%	832	46.20%	56	3.11%	81	4.50%	1,801
Wyoming (Note: The official return from Wyoming County was received in Richmond after the legal deadline for submission of returns and so was not counted in the totals.)	60	61.22%	29	29.60%	9	9.18%	0	0.00%	98
Wythe	617	43.03%	795	55.44%	22	1.53%	0	0.00%	1,434
York	227	70.93%	90	28.13%	3	0.94%	0	0.00%	320
Total	74,701	44.65%	74,379	44.46%	16,292	9.74%	1,929	1.15%	167,301

== Analysis ==
Virginia was one of only three states to vote for the Constitutional Union candidate, former U.S. Senator John Bell, over the Southern Democratic candidate, Vice President John C. Breckinridge, and the Northern Democratic candidate, U.S. Senator Stephen A. Douglas. Former U.S. Representative Abraham Lincoln was also the Republican candidate in this election, but he received the lowest support for any Republican presidential candidate (as well as the lowest support of any candidate who won the presidency) in the history of Virginia.

This was the first presidential election since the formation of political parties in which Virginia did not vote for the Democratic or Democratic-Republican candidate. It was also the closest presidential election result in Virginia history: Bell won by 156 votes, or a margin of 0.093474% – the thirteenth-closest statewide presidential result in United States history and the closest between 1836 and 1876. Virginia eventually seceded from the United States on April 17, 1861, and did not participate in the following elections in 1864 and 1868. However, unionist counties in the Ohio basin, plus a number of adjacent counties in the northwest, seceded to form the state of West Virginia and did participate in those two elections. As of the 2024 presidential election, this is the last election in which Morgan County, one of the counties that broke off to form West Virginia, did not vote for the Republican candidate.

Virginia was the only one of the eleven states that would later declare their secession from the Union and be controlled by Confederate armies where any ballots for Lincoln were distributed, and the vast majority of the votes Lincoln received were cast in border counties of what would soon become West Virginia – the future state accounted for 1,832 of Lincoln's 1,929 votes. Lincoln received no votes at all in 121 of the state's then-145 counties (including 31 of the 50 that would form West Virginia), received a single vote in three counties and received ten or fewer votes in nine of the 24 counties where he polled votes. Lincoln's best results, by far, were in the four counties that comprised the state's northern panhandle, a region which had long felt alienated from Richmond and which was economically and culturally linked to its neighbors Ohio and Pennsylvania and which would become the key driver in the successful effort to form a separate state. Hancock County (Virginia's northernmost at the time) returned Lincoln's best result – he polled over 40% of the vote there and finished in second place (Lincoln polled only eight votes fewer than Breckinridge). Of the 97 votes cast for Lincoln in the state's post-1863 boundaries, 93 were polled in four counties along the Potomac River and four were cast in the coastal city of Portsmouth.

== See also ==
- United States presidential elections in Virginia

== Works cited ==
- Abbott, Richard (1986). The Republican Party and the South, 1855–1877: The First Southern Strategy. University of North Carolina Press. ISBN 0807816809.
- Lowe, Richard (1973). "The Republican Party in Antebellum Virginia, 1856-1860". The Virginia Magazine of History and Biography. 81 (3). Virginia Historical Society: 259–79. doi:10.2307/4247810. JSTOR 4247810.
