= Republic of Texas–United States relations =

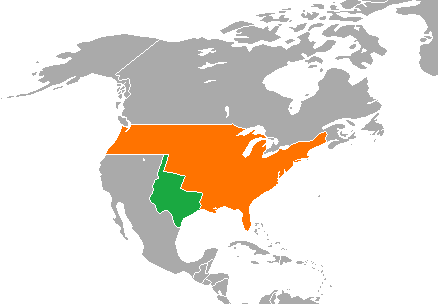

- Texas: United States

Republic of Texas–United States relations refers to the historical foreign relations between the now-defunct Republic of Texas and the United States of America. Relations started in 1836 after the Texas Revolution and ended in 1845 upon the annexation of Texas by the United States.

== U.S. involvement in Texan independence ==
Following Mexico's independence from the Spanish Empire in 1821, the population of Texas included only 4,000 Tejanos. The new Mexican government, eager to populate the region, encouraged foreigners, including residents of the United States, to help settle the region; by 1830 the number of American settlers in Texas topped 30,000. In 1835, Texas joined the Mexican states of Coahuila, Nuevo León, Tamaulipas, Zacatecas, and Yucatán in rebellion against the central government in response to President Santa Anna suspending the Constitution of 1824, disbanding Congress, and making himself the center of power in Mexico. The United States decided to support the revolution by providing arms and supplies to the Texas rebels, eventually leading to independence and the founding of the Republic of Texas in 1836.

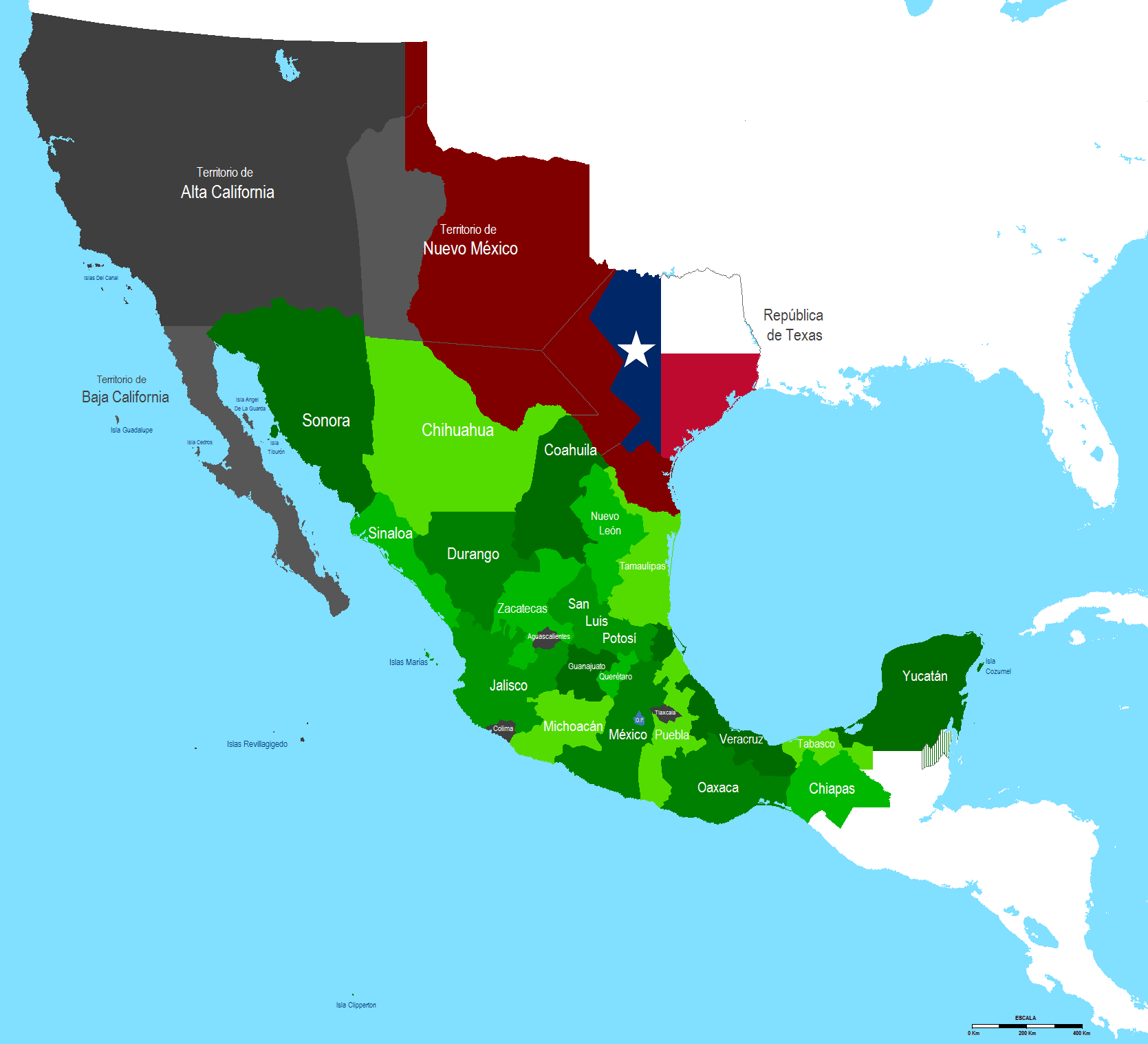
Independent Texas shown by Texan Flag, Mexican territory claimed by Texas shown in velvet red

== Bilateral relations ==
The United States recognized Texan independence on March 3, 1836, when U.S. President Andrew Jackson nominated Alcée La Branche as Chargée d'affaires to Texas. Diplomatic relations began when the U.S. Secretary of State accepted the credentials of William H. Wharton, Texan Minister to the United States, on March 6, 1837. Alcée La Branche, the appointed Chargé d'Affaires of the U.S. Legation in Houston, then functioning as the seat of government, presented his credentials sometime between October 23 and 27, 1837. In 1841, The United States' chargé d'affairs to Texas opened a legation in Austin, in 1841 The Republic of Texas opened an embassy in Washington, DC.

Prior to Texan independence, a consulate was established at Galveston, and Joseph Washington Eliot Wallace was confirmed as consul on March 29, 1830. Additional consulates existed at the following locations:

- Goliad: Earliest Date: January 9, 1835. No extant latest date.
- Matagorda: Earliest Date: June 26, 1838. No extant latest date.
- Sabine: Earliest Date: March 21, 1843. Latest date: December 29, 1845
- Velasco (Freeport) Earliest Date: October 12, 1837. No extant latest date.

Although Texas entered the United States as a state on December 29, 1845, relations formally ended during the transfer of Texan sovereignty to the United States on February 19, 1846. Despite this, Andrew J. Donelson, the last U.S. Chargé d'Affaires, left his post on or shortly after August 9, 1845.

=== Treaties ===
On April 11, 1838, the U.S. concluded a Claims Convention with the Republic of Texas. This agreement was signed by Alcée La Branche, the U.S. Chargé d'Affaires near the Republic of Texas and R.A. Irion, the Secretary of State of the Republic of Texas, and served to set Texan indemnity to the United States for injuries suffered by U.S. Citizens by Texan authorities as well as indemnity to compensate U.S. merchants for the capture, seizure, and confiscation of two U.S. vessels.

On April 25, 1838, the U.S. and the Republic of Texas signed a convention to mark the boundary between the two states.

== U.S. annexation of Texas ==
The Republic of Texas was annexed into the United States and admitted as the 28th state on December 29, 1845. Initially rejected due to concerns over slavery and potential conflict with Mexico, Texas faced economic decline by the early 1840s, prompting President Sam Houston to seek recognition of independence from Mexico. U.S. President John Tyler pursued annexation to counter British influence, leading to a treaty in 1844, which was rejected by the Senate. The annexation debate became central in the 1844 presidential election, with pro-annexation Democrat James K. Polk winning. In 1845, Congress passed a joint resolution for annexation, leading to Texas's statehood and prompting the Mexican-American War in 1846.

=== Issues ===
One of the issues at play in the interactions between the United States and the Republic of Texas was the eventual annexation of Texas by the U.S. There were two main difficulties with the issue of Texas joining the United States at the time: first, incorporating Texas into the Union might provoke Mexico; and second, Texas wished to join as a slave state.

On August 23, 1843, Mexican Foreign Minister Bocanegra informed U.S. Envoy Extraordinary and Minister Plenipotentiary to Mexico, Waddy Thompson, that U.S. annexation of Texas would be grounds for war. On March 1, 1845, U.S. President John Tyler signed a congressional joint resolution favoring the annexation of Texas. On March 4, 1845, U.S. President James Knox Polk noted his approval of the "reunion" of the Republic of Texas with the United States in his inaugural address. In response, the Mexican Minister of Foreign Affairs informed U.S. Minister to Mexico, Wilson Shannon, on March 28, 1845, that Mexico was severing diplomatic relations with the United States. In December 1845 Texas was admitted to the union as the twenty-eighth state. In April 1846, Mexican troops attacked what they perceived to be invading U.S. forces that had occupied territory claimed by both Mexico and the United States, and on May 13, the U.S. Congress declared war against Mexico.

Another issue raised by the debate over Texan annexation was that of slavery. Since the early nineteenth century, Texas was a producer of cotton. It was also dependent upon slave labor to produce its cotton. The question of whether or not the United States should annex Texas came at a time of increased tensions between the Northern and Southern states of the Union over the legality and morality of slavery; thus, the possibility of admitting Texas as another slave state proved to be contentious.

== See also ==
- Republic of Texas–Mexico relations
- Texas Revolution
- History of Texas
- Mexican–American War
- Texas Annexation
- Mexico–United States relations
