= Foreign relations of the Republic of Texas =

Texan Flag

The Republic of Texas was a North American nation from 1836 to 1846; in its short time it established diplomatic relations worldwide, mainly through the cotton trade.

== Bilateral relations of nations ==
=== Austria ===
William H. Daingerfield, a representative of Texas, visited Austria in February 1845 and found the people of Vienna to have a favorable impression of the Republic. While in Vienna, Daingerfield received news of Texas' annexation to the United States, and therefore was prohibited to communicate with the Austrian government despite repeated entreaties.

The Austrian Empire was well aware of the Republic of Texas; František Ladislav Rieger used the ideals of popular sovereignty in the Texan Constitution to craft a constitution of Austria-Hungary, and many Austrians moved to Texas. In Hungary, the newspaper Vasárnapi Újság, which published extensive information about the Republic, put out a call for ladies to move to Texas. Many Czechs also immigrated to the Republic.

=== Belgium ===
Texas had a consulate in Antwerp. Just five years after Belgian independence, Texas declared independence. Texas exported cotton, corn, and other raw materials to Belgium. Belgium exported iron, tea, beer, and many other products to Texas. Belgium had a legation in Austin, and Texas had an embassy in Brussels.

=== Denmark ===
Denmark was very hesitant to recognize Texas at first, as it deemed its relations with Mexico a priority, and worried that recognition of Texas would violate the 1827 Treaty of Friendship, Trade and Navigation it had signed with Mexico. Denmark, though not extending itself diplomatically, did however go as far as allowing Texan goods into Danish ports but would later put a tariff on all imports from Texas. Aside from the almost one-way trading, relations between the two nations were almost non-existent.

Trade between the two nations was minimal, but the Texas did export some cotton and corn to Denmark and its colonies. Denmark may have exported some wheat and finished goods to the Texas republic; however, this cannot be proven. Trade did not last long before Denmark put a tariff on Texan goods.

=== Federal Republic of Central America ===
In 1823 Mexico's southernmost provinces seceded from the union forming a Federation of their own, under the name Federal Republic of Central America. Texas seceded in a much different fashion, and for different reasons, but with the same intention of being free from Mexico. Thus the two nations were seen as destined for diplomacy but few missions were ever enacted, due to their differences in religion, language, and ethics. Perhaps Texas' greatest influence over the Federation was the encouragement of nationalism, and in fact the strong feeling of nationalism Texas had was growing in The Central American States, triggering the fragmentation of the Federation into five independent states. Trade and relations between Texas and the former FRCA remained at a minimum, but Guatemala continued relations, and in 1845 was considering opening an embassy in Austin, Texas; however, Texas was annexed by the United States before this was possible.

=== France ===
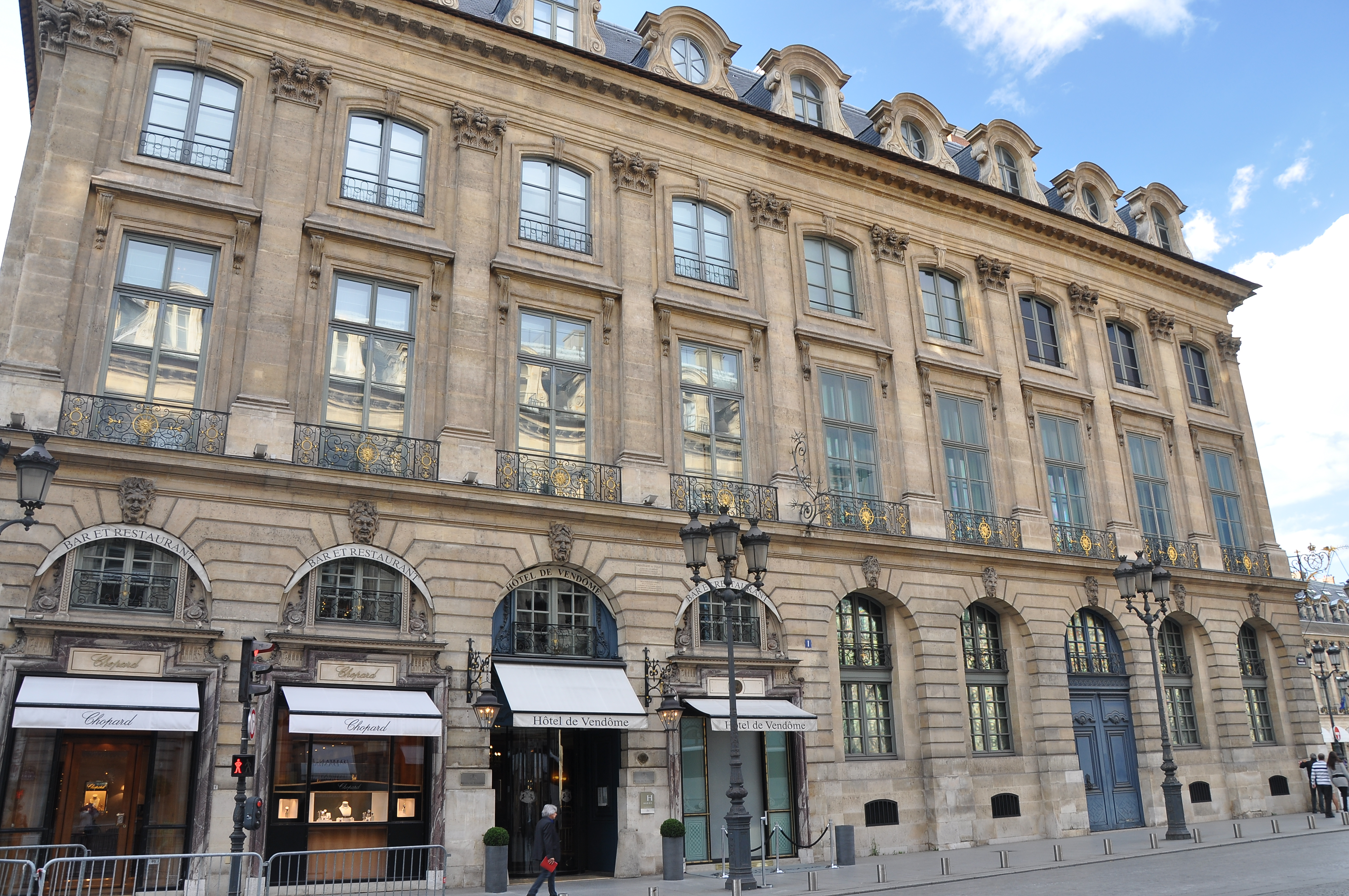
The Hôtel Bataille de Francès, place Vendôme in Paris, housed the Embassy of the Republic of Texas

France began the steps toward official recognition of Texas on September 25, 1839. In 1841 the French opened a legation in Austin, and Texas opened an embassy in Paris. A legation is the equivalent of an embassy, but in that era monarchies sent only legations to republics, with embassies only being sent to other monarchies.

=== Great Britain ===
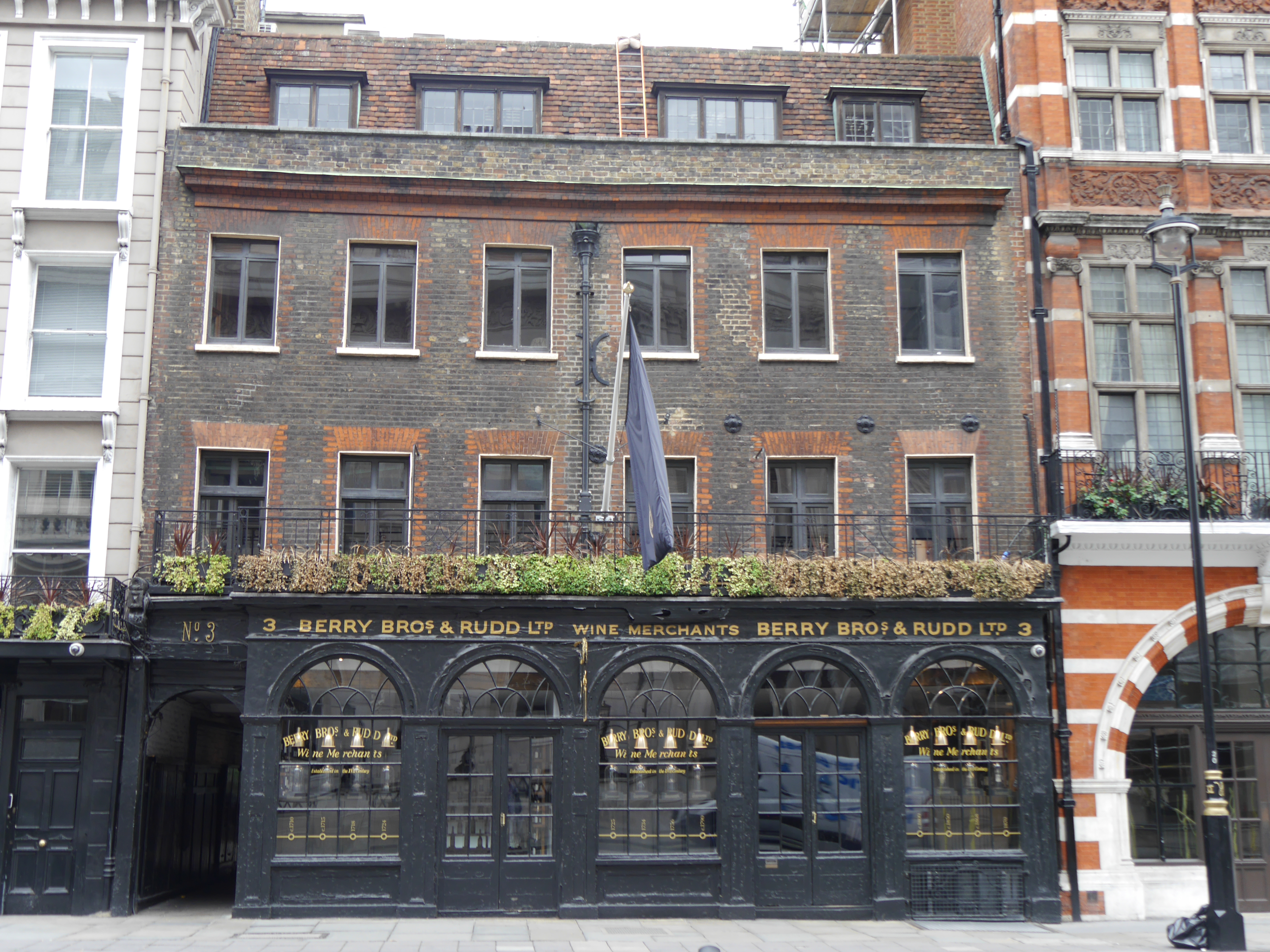
Building housing the Texas Legation from 1842-1845, London

Texas had a consulate in London; Britain had a consulate in Houston. In 1845 Texas was in the process of applying for an embassy in London; the United States annexed Texas before this was possible. The British never intended to open an embassy in Austin. France also considered putting a consulate general in Houston.

The British Empire had strong diplomatic relations with Mexico since 1824. When Texas seceded from Mexico, the Mexican government refused to recognize its sovereignty. The British Empire wanted to maintain its diplomacy with Mexico, thus denying recognition of the Republic of Texas. The British went so far as to supply the Mexican Navy with ironclad warships. At the same time, London ports were secretly accepting Texan goods. Of all the reasons for refusal of recognition, none were so important as the practice of slavery, which was outlawed throughout the British Empire but practiced in Texas, thus creating an ethical divide between the two nations, solidifying Britain's stance on the Texas sovereignty issue.

The British Empire and the Republic of Texas, regardless of the former's refusal to recognize the latter as independent, imported and exported trade goods. The British allowed more imports than exports, Texan cotton was needed for textile work in England, some of the finished product, which was sold world wide, found its way back to Texas on British ships.

Eventually, the British Empire recognized the Republic of Texas in the summer of 1842.

=== Hanseatic Cities ===
From the early to mid 1840s, Texas sought to, and technically did establish diplomatic and trade relations with the three Hanseatic cities of Lübeck, Bremen, and Hamburg, though the trade negotiations were finalized too late to really bear any fruit. The three Hanseatic Republics were each for themselves sovereign city-states, yet linked through a joint foreign policy. They already maintained a consulate in Galveston (later also Indianola), and were Texas' third largest trading partner, after the U.S. and Britain.

Negotiations for a Friendship, Commerce, and Navigation Treaty were initiated by the Texan Envoy and Minister to the Netherlands, and commenced in 1841. The treaty foresaw a most favored nation-clause not only between the three city-states and Texas, but also extendable to any state of the German Confederation. Talks were initially held in Hamburg, but later moved to Paris. It took until April 1844 for the treaty to be signed, by which time Lübeck, Hamburg, and Texas foresaw the coming accession of Texas to the U.S., and did not bother ratifying the treaty. Bremen was the only party where the treaty was ratified, coming into effect in December 1844.

=== Mexico ===
Mexico never recognized Texas' independence. Instead the Mexican government considered Texas a rebellious territory still belonging to Mexico. By 1838 Texas had a firm hold on its eastern lands, but the majority of Texas remained under Mexican control. Texas claimed the official southern and western border between the two countries to be the Rio Grande. Mexico considered it a ridiculous compromise to allow even the eastern part of Texas to remain independent.

=== Netherlands ===
It did not take long for the Netherlands to decide to open an embassy in Austin, in mimicry of Belgium. In response, Texas opened an embassy in Amsterdam. France, Belgium, and the Netherlands were the only three European nations to fully and officially recognize Texas as a sovereign nation.

A marginal number of Dutch immigrants began to settle in Texas; however, the percentage of Dutch Texans would remain below 3% until after the Civil War and the end of the American Restoration, when Dutch majority towns, such as Nederland, began to pop up across the state. Very few, if any Texans moved to the Netherlands.

Texas exported cotton, corn and other raw materials to the Netherlands, the Netherlands exported textiles, chocolate, beer and many other products to Texas.

=== Russian Empire ===
Russia did not commence diplomacy with Mexico until 1890. Attempting to maintain its relations with the US, Russia recognized Texas as an independent state from 1836 until the annexation of Texas by the United States, which Russia also fully supported. Neither Russia nor Texas built an embassy in the other's capital, and it is not known if diplomats were sent.

Texas exported cotton, and possibly some corn to Russia; however the amount was minute in comparison to that sent to Western Europe. Russia exported nothing to Texas, but did export wheat and grain to the United States, some of which may have been exported to Texas.

=== United States ===
In 1831 the United States opened an legation in Austin. In 1841 the Republic of Texas opened an embassy in Washington, DC.

=== Republic of Yucatán ===
Yucatán had an embassy in Austin, Texas had an embassy in Mérida. Both insurgencies had tried to secede from Mexico, and aided each other in disputes with Mexico. The Yucatán insurgency was unsuccessful.

== Treaties of the Republic of Texas ==
=== Treaties of Velasco ===
The Treaties of Velasco were two documents signed at Velasco, Texas, (which is now Freeport, Texas) on May 14, 1836, between President of Mexico, General Antonio López de Santa Anna, and victorious Texians, in the aftermath of Battle of San Jacinto (April 21, 1836). At the time, Santa Anna was held prisoner and entered into the agreements under duress. The signatories were Interim President David G. Burnet for Texas and General Santa Anna for Mexico. The Treaties were intended, on the part of the Texans, to provide a conclusion of hostilities between the two belligerents and offer the first steps toward the official recognition of the breakaway region's independence. However, there was a public treaty and a secret treaty, and the treaty was never ratified by the Mexican Congress. Moreover, the documents were not even called "treaties" until so characterized by U.S. President James K. Polk in his justifications for war some ten years later, as was pointed out by Congressman Abraham Lincoln in 1848.

=== Treaty of Bird's Fort ===
The Treaty of Bird’s Fort, or Bird’s Fort Treaty was a peace treaty between the Republic of Texas and some of the Native American tribes of Texas and Oklahoma, signed on September 29, 1843. The treaty was intended to end years of hostilities and warfare between the Native Americans and the white settlers in Texas. The full title of the treaty was “Republic of Texas Treaty with the Indigenous Nations of the Delaware, Chickasaw, Waco, Tawakani, Keechi, Caddo, Anadahkah, Ionie, Biloxi, and Cherokee.”

=== Treaty of Tehuacana Creek ===
The Treaty of Tehuacana Creek (or the Treaty of Peace, Friendship and Commerce) was signed at Tehuacana Creek on October 9, 1844 between representatives from the Republic of Texas and various Native American tribes. The tribes involved in the signing of the treaty were the Comanche, the Keechi, the Waco, Caddo, Anadarko, Ioni, Delaware, Shawnee, Cherokee, Lipan Apache, and Tawakoni tribes. Based on the terms of the treaty, both Native Americans and Texans agreed to cease all hostilities and establish more cooperative political and commercial ties. Texas violated the terms of all treaties. The Cherokee, Delaware, and Shawnee were driven out by unprovoked attacks. The Tonkawa were nearly exterminated. The Lipan were either driven to Mexico or took refuge with the Mexican population.

== See also ==
- List of ambassadors of the United States to Texas
