= Tilghman Howard =

American politician

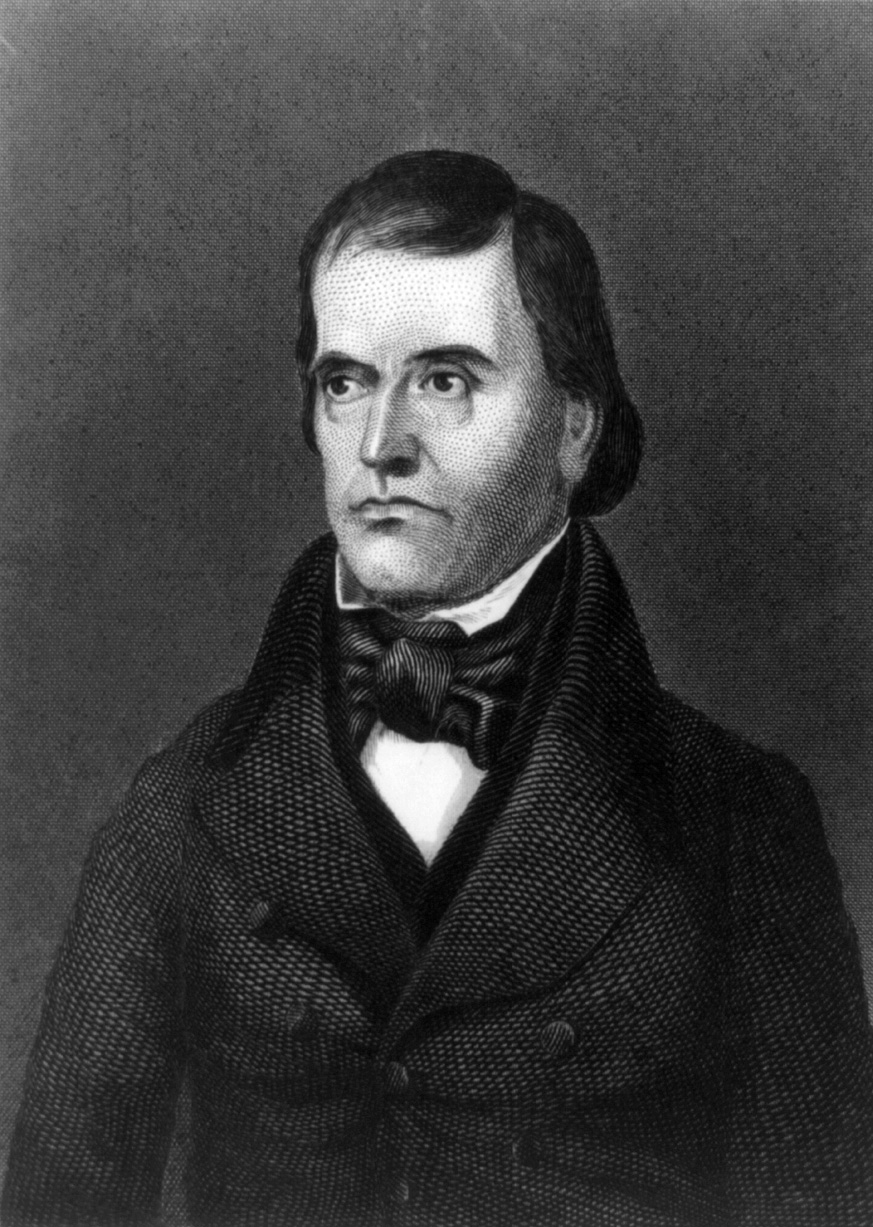

5th Chargé d'Affaires of the United States to Texas
- In office August 2, 1844 – August 16, 1844
- President: John Tyler
- Preceded by: William Sumter Murphy
- Succeeded by: Andrew Jackson Donelson

Member of the U.S. House of Representatives from Indiana's 7th district
- In office August 5, 1839 – July 1, 1840
- Preceded by: Albert Smith White
- Succeeded by: Henry S. Lane

5th United States Attorney for the District of Indiana
- In office 1833–1839
- President: Andrew Jackson; Martin Van Buren
- Preceded by: Samuel Judah
- Succeeded by: John Pettit

Personal details
- Born: Tilghman Ashurst Howard; November 14, 1797 Easley, South Carolina, United States
- Died: August 16, 1844 (aged 46) Washington-on-the-Brazos, Republic of Texas
- Cause of death: Yellow fever
- Resting place: Rockville Cemetery, Rockville, Indiana
- Party: Democratic
- Occupation: Lawyer

Tilghman Ashurst Howard (November 14, 1797 – August 16, 1844) was an American lawyer, politician, and diplomat from Indiana. He was born near Easley, South Carolina. He moved to Knoxville, Tennessee, in 1816 and was admitted to the bar there in 1818. In 1830, he moved to Bloomington, Indiana, and in 1833 to Rockville, Indiana. President Andrew Jackson appointed him US Attorney for Indiana, and he served as such from 1833 to 1839. In 1838, he sought, unsuccessfully, to be elected to the U.S. Senate. He was elected to the United States House of Representatives on August 5, 1839, and served until he resigned on July 1, 1840.

In 1841, Howard unsuccessfully defended the blacksmith Noah Beauchamp against a murder charge. Beauchamp was convicted and executed in Parke County, Indiana.

He sought election as Governor of Indiana in 1840 and as United States Senator in 1843 but was unsuccessful. He was appointed chargé d'affaires to the Republic of Texas on June 11, 1844, and presented his credentials on August 2, 1844; he served all of two weeks before his untimely death in Washington-on-the-Brazos, Texas, at the age of 46. Howard is buried in Rockville, Indiana.

Howard County, Indiana, and Howard County, Iowa, are named in his honor.

Party political offices
Preceded by John Dunmount	Democratic nominee for Governor of Indiana; 1840	Succeeded by James Whitcomb
Legal offices
Preceded by Samuel Judah	United States Attorney for the District of Indiana; 1833–1839	Succeeded by John Pettit
U.S. House of Representatives
Preceded by Albert S. White	Member of the U.S. House of Representatives from Indiana's 7th congressional district August 5, 1839 – July 1, 1840	Succeeded by Henry S. Lane
Diplomatic posts
Preceded by William Sumter Murphy	Chargé d'Affaires of U.S. Mission to Texas; August 1844	Succeeded by Andrew Jackson Donelson
