= Republic of Texas–Spain relations =

Republic of Texas-Kingdom of Spain relations
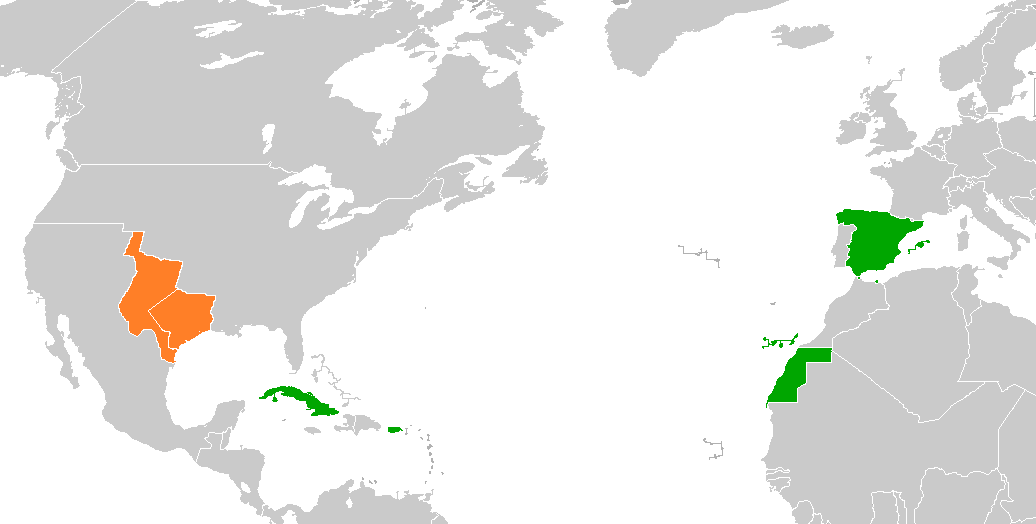
- Spain: Texas

Spain–Texas relations refers to the historical foreign relations between the Spanish Empire and the Republic of Texas, which began unofficially around 1839, when Spain refused to assist Mexico in the reconquest of Texas. The relations ended in 1846, with the annexation of Texas to the United States of America.

== Diplomacy ==
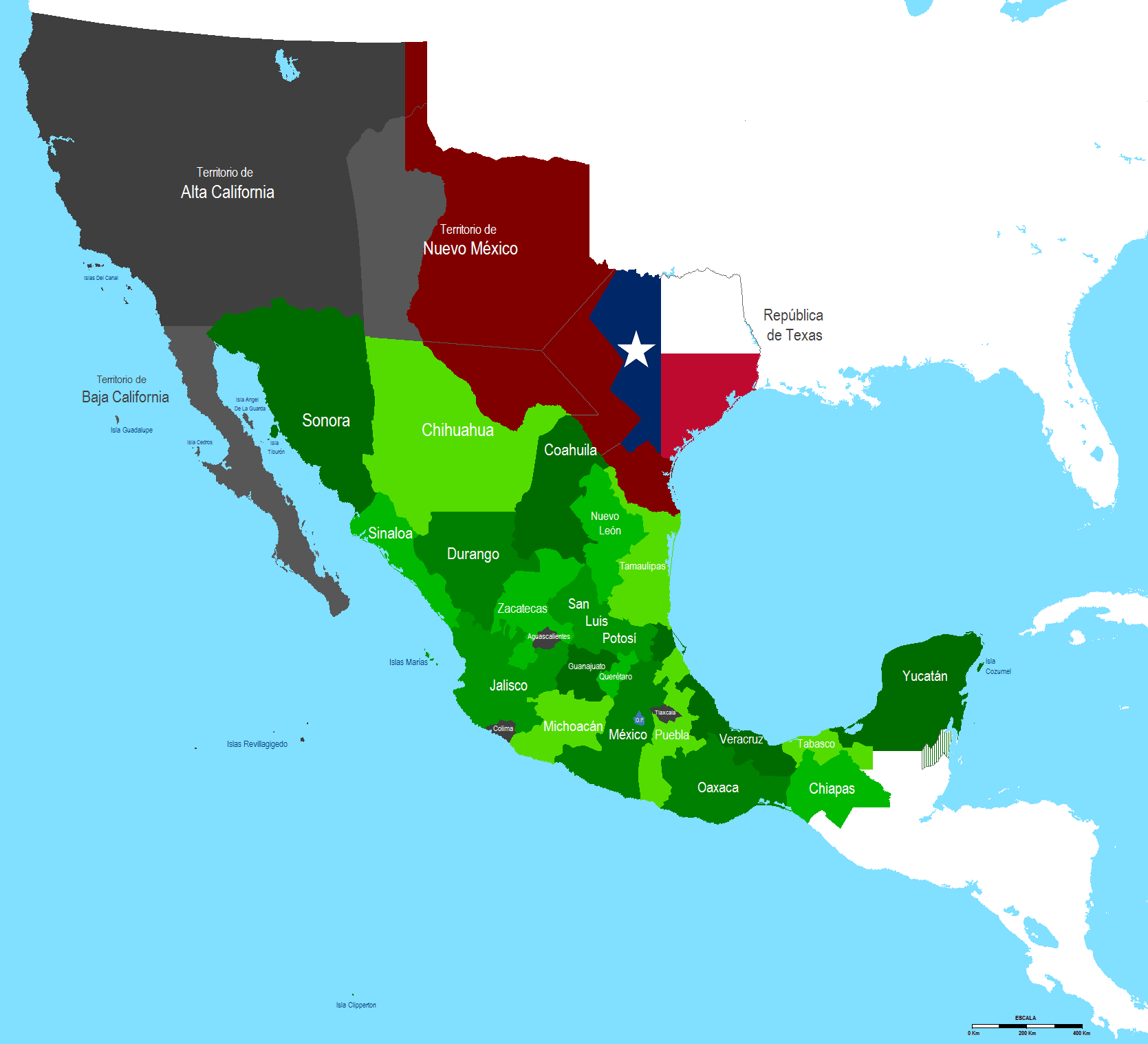
Independent Texas shown with the Texas flag, Mexican-occupied Texas in maroon.

When the Anglo-American settlers of the Mexican state of Coahuila and Texas proclaimed the independence of Texas in 1835, relations between Mexico and its former metropolis, Spain, were beginning to warm after nearly a decade of attempts at reconquest. Thus, in 1836, bilateral relations between the two nations were opened, and since the Mexican government of President Antonio López de Santa Anna never diplomatically recognized the Texan rebels, successive progressive and moderate Spanish governments refused to establish any contact with them.

By 1839, the Texan independence fighters had already acquired vast control of the territory they claimed and began negotiations with many Western European countries, while exporting cotton to almost the entire world. However, the cultural differences between Spain and the armed colonists were great, not only linguistically, but also in the field of faith, since the majority of Texans were Baptists, while the Spanish State maintained Catholicism as its official religion. Both nations divided regarding slavery, on which the Republic of Texas was founded, since in Spain and most of its colonies it had been abolished.

== Trade ==
The Spanish government imposed a high tariff on all goods from Texas, since the need for Texas cotton was low due to the fact that it could be grown in Spain itself and throughout the Mediterranean basin. Spain refused to export goods to the Republic of Texas, although some Spanish products found their way to Texas ports via Cuba and Puerto Rico, both Spanish colonies.

== See also ==
- Foreign relations of the Republic of Texas
