= William Sumter Murphy =

American diplomat

William S. Murphy

4th Chargé d'Affaires of the United States to Texas
- In office June 16, 1843 – July 13, 1844
- President: John Tyler
- Preceded by: Joseph Eve
- Succeeded by: Tilghman Howard

Personal details
- Born: William Sumter Murphy; 1796 South Carolina, United States
- Died: July 13, 1844 (aged 47–48) Galveston, Republic of Texas
- Cause of death: Yellow fever
- Resting place: Chillicothe, Ohio
- Party: Independent (1841-44)
- Other political affiliations: Whig (1840-41); Democratic (before 1840)
- Spouse: Lucinda Sterret
- Occupation: Lawyer

Military service
- Allegiance: United States
- Branch/service: Ohio State militia
- Rank: Brigadier general
- Battles/wars: Toledo War

William Sumter Murphy (1796–1844) was an American lawyer and diplomat, known for serving as the American chargé d'affaires to Texas in 1843 and 1844.

== Early life ==
Murphy was born in South Carolina in 1796; in his early years, he read law in Virginia, and began practicing in Chillicothe, Ohio, in 1818.

Three years later, in 1821, he married Lucinda Sterret.

== Political and military career ==
Although his excellent oratorical skills made him a sought-after criminal defense lawyer, Murphy was primarily interested in politics. Referred to as the "Patrick Henry of the West", Murphy made use of his abilities on behalf of the Democratic Party.

In 1832, he challenged future governor William Allen for a seat in the United States House of Representatives, in Ohio's 7th district. Murphy lost, and Allen became a highly successful Ohio politician. Discouraged by the experience, Murphy abandoned the Democrats for the rest of his life.

Murphy also served in the Ohio state militia, attaining the rank of brigadier general, and provided his services to the Governor of Ohio, in the aftermath of the Toledo War.

Having become a member of the Whigs by 1840, Murphy supported William Henry Harrison in the 1840 election. Upon the expulsion of Harrison's Vice President-turned-successor, John Tyler, however, the Whigs also lost Murphy, who defended the policies of Tyler's administration.

== Diplomat ==
Because he had supported the President, Murphy was given two diplomatic appointments: the first in 1841; the second in 1843.

=== Central America ===
His first position, as the "Special and Confidential Agent of the United States to Central America" in 1841, was to the failing Federal Republic of Central America. Although it had mostly dissolved by the time Murphy arrived in December, he presented his credentials to Guatemala.

Although there were rumors that the Federation would be revived, Murphy, hampered by malaria, suffered through three laborious months, before recognizing the futility of such beliefs. He relayed the designs of the British on the Mosquito Coast and other regions in the area, prior to returning to the United States on March 30, 1842.

=== Texas ===
On April 10, 1843, Murphy received his second appointment: he was to be the fourth chargé d'affaires to the Republic of Texas, to replace Joseph Eve. This was an interim appointment, subject to the approval of the United States Senate. Nevertheless, Murphy took up his appointment and presented his credentials, as chargé d'affaires, to Texas on June 16, 1843.

A week later, the appointment of Abel P. Upshur as Secretary of State made the annexation of Texas a priority issue for the Tyler administration. While not directly engaged in negotiations, Murphy did exchange correspondence with President Houston of Texas, and took part in secret preparations for the passage of the Tyler-Texas treaty. This included unauthorized agreements for military and naval protection. Although they had been agreed upon and carried out by President Tyler after he signed the treaty in April 1844, this significantly jeopardized Murphy's confirmation process, and led to the resignation of Treasury Secretary John Canfield Spencer.

The Tyler-Texas treaty and associated correspondence were leaked to the public in late April; the Senate rejected the treaty in early June. In the interim, on May 23, 1844, Murphy's nomination was considered and rejected by the Senate. As a result, he was recalled from Galveston.

== Death and burial ==
Prior to his recall, he fell ill with yellow fever and died, at his post, on July 13, 1844. He was the third charge to do so.

He was originally buried in Galveston; but he was later buried in Chillicothe, Ohio, on the site of a former train depot.

Diplomatic posts
Preceded by Joseph Eve	Chargé d'affaires of the United States to Texas; 1843–1844	Succeeded by Tilghman Howard
