= Andrew Jackson Donelson =

American diplomat (1799–1871)

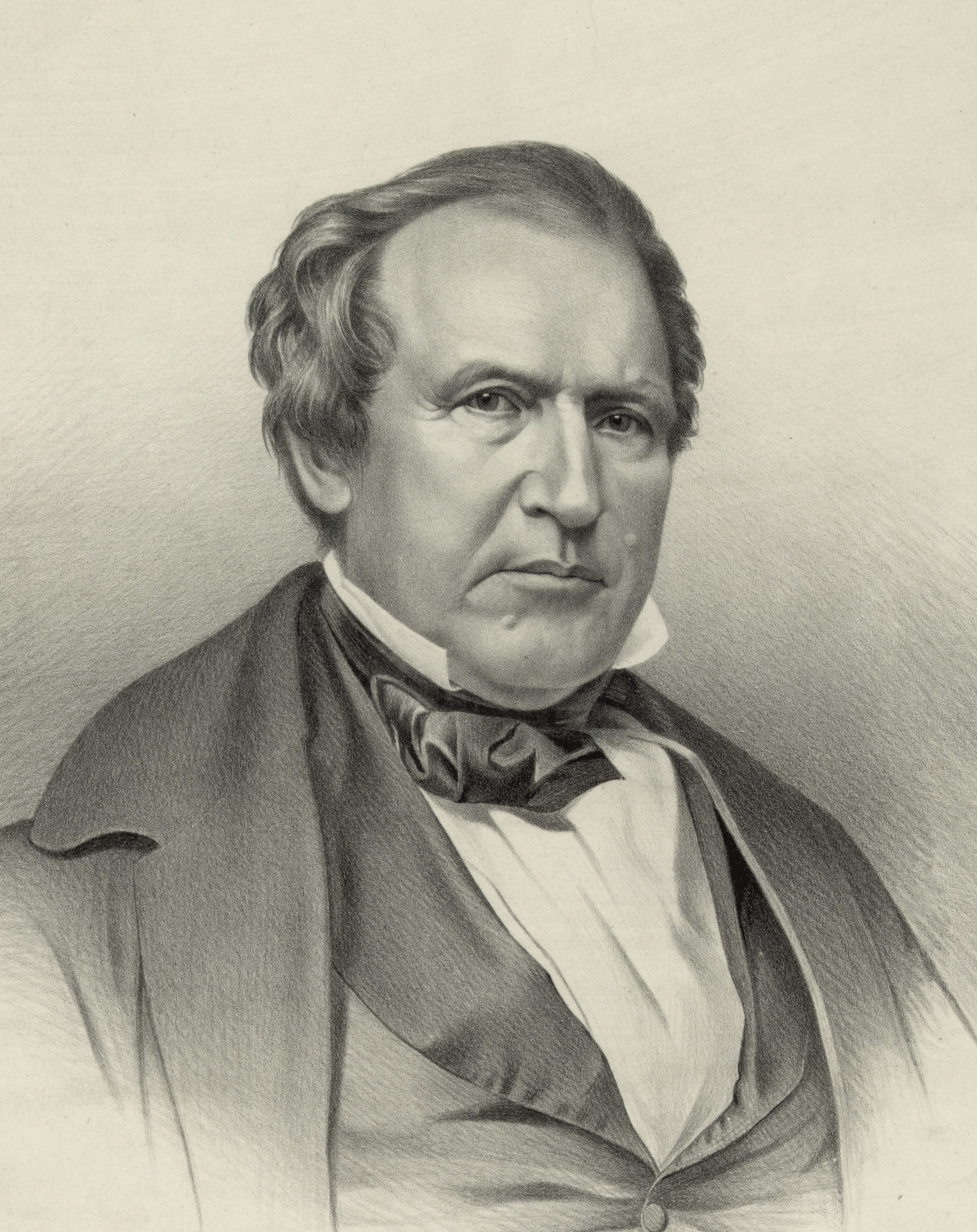
- Lithograph c. 1860s

United States Minister to Prussia
- In office July 18, 1846 – November 2, 1849
- President: James K. Polk; Zachary Taylor
- Preceded by: Henry Wheaton
- Succeeded by: Edward A. Hannegan

United States Chargé d'Affaires to Texas
- In office November 29, 1844 – August 9, 1845
- President: John Tyler; James K. Polk
- Preceded by: Tilghman Howard
- Succeeded by: Position abolished

Private Secretary to the President
- In office March 4, 1829 – March 4, 1837
- President: Andrew Jackson
- Preceded by: John Adams II
- Succeeded by: Abraham Van Buren II

Personal details
- Born: August 25, 1799 Nashville, Tennessee, U.S.
- Died: June 26, 1871 (aged 71) Memphis, Tennessee, U.S.
- Party: Democratic
- Other political affiliations: Know Nothing (1856); Constitutional Union (1860)
- Spouses: Emily Donelson (m. 1824; died 1836) Elizabeth Martin Randolph (m. 1841; died 1871)
- Children: 12
- Relatives: Rachel Jackson (paternal aunt/adoptive mother); Daniel Smith Donelson (brother)
- Education: University of Nashville; United States Military Academy (BS); Transylvania University

Andrew Jackson Donelson (August 25, 1799 – June 26, 1871) was an American diplomat and politician. He served in various positions as a Democrat and was the Know Nothing nominee for US vice president in 1856.

After the death of his father, Donelson lived with his aunt, Rachel Jackson, and her husband, Andrew Jackson. Donelson attended the U.S. Military Academy and served under his uncle in Florida. He resigned his commission, studied law, passed the bar and began his own practice in Nashville. He assisted Jackson's presidential campaigns and served as his private secretary after Jackson won the 1828 presidential election. He returned to Tennessee after the end of Jackson's presidency in 1837 and remained active in local politics.

After helping James K. Polk triumph at the 1844 Democratic National Convention, Donelson was appointed by U.S. President John Tyler to represent the United States in the Republic of Texas, where Donelson played an important role in the Texas annexation. In 1846, President Polk appointed Donelson as Minister to Prussia. Donelson left that position in 1849 and became the editor of a Democratic newspaper but alienated various factions in the party. In 1856, the Know Nothings chose Donelson as their vice presidential nominee, and he campaigned on a ticket with former Whig President Millard Fillmore. The ticket finished in third place in both the electoral and popular vote, behind the Democratic and the Republican tickets. Donelson also participated in the 1860 Constitutional Union Convention.

== Early life ==
One of the three sons of Samuel and Mary Donelson, Andrew Jackson Donelson was born in Nashville, Tennessee. His younger brother, Daniel Smith Donelson, would become the Confederate brigadier general after whom Fort Donelson was later named. Donelson's father died when Donelson was about five. When his mother remarried, Donelson moved to The Hermitage, the home of his aunt, Rachel Donelson Jackson, and her husband, Donelson's namesake, the future US President Andrew Jackson. Rachel and Andrew Jackson took care of all three Donelson sons, including Andrew.

Donelson attended Cumberland College, predecessor to the University of Nashville, in Nashville; joined the US Military Academy at West Point, New York; and graduated second in his class in 1820. His two years as an officer in the US Army were spent as aide-de-camp to Andrew Jackson, now a major general who was campaigning against the Seminoles in Florida. After the campaign, Donelson resigned his commission and studied law at Transylvania University, in Lexington, Kentucky. A year later, he started to practice law in Nashville.

== Democratic politics ==
Donelson assisted his uncle during the 1824 and 1828 presidential campaigns. In 1829, he became the private secretary to his uncle, who had been inaugurated as President of the United States. Donelson's wife, Emily, served as White House hostess and acting First Lady of the United States because Rachel Jackson had died in December 1828. Donelson remained Jackson's private secretary throughout his administration. During Donelson's stay in Washington, Donelson had his new home, Poplar Grove (later renamed Tulip Grove), constructed on the land he had inherited from his father, which was adjacent to the Hermitage.

In 1836, Tulip Grove was completed. Donelson moved back to Nashville after Jackson's retirement the following year. Donelson helped Jackson sustain the Democratic Party in a variety of ways for the next seven years in services such as writing newspaper editorials defending Democratic principles and helping Democratic candidates campaign for state, local, and national offices.

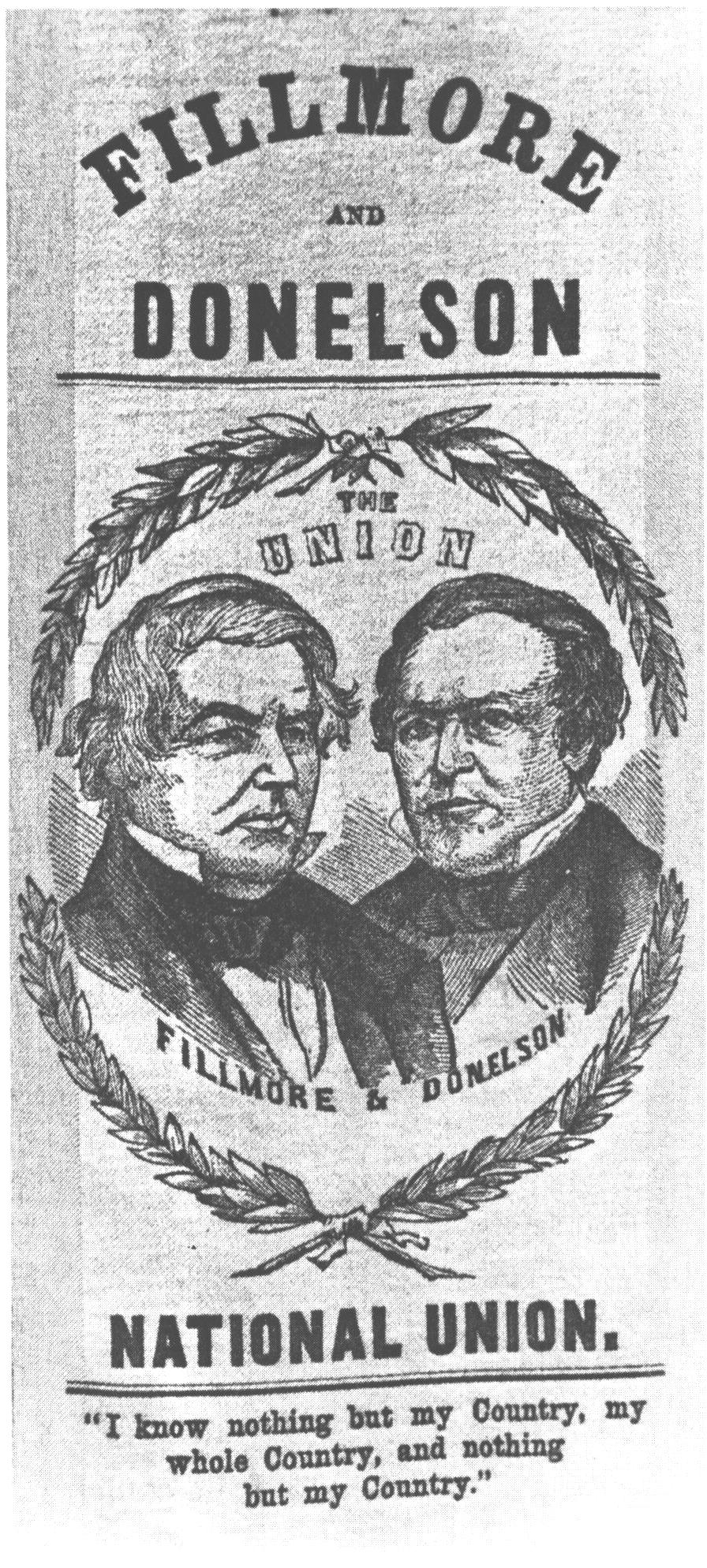
A campaign ribbon for the Fillmore-Donelson ticket

In 1844, Donelson was instrumental in helping James K. Polk win the Democratic presidential nomination over Martin Van Buren and other more notable candidates. US President John Tyler appointed Donelson chargé d'affaires of the United States mission to the Republic of Texas, probably in the hope that Jackson's nephew would be able to persuade former Tennessee politician Sam Houston to endorse the US annexation of Texas. Donelson was successful in that endeavor, and Texas joined the United States on December 29, 1845. Donelson was then made minister to Prussia in 1846, a position that he would hold until President Polk's Democratic administration was replaced by the Whig administration of Zachary Taylor in 1849. Donelson's constant complaining about his personal finances and his desire for a higher salary probably had more to do with the change than partisan differences.

Between September 1848 and November 1849, during the time of the Frankfurt Parliament, he was the US envoy to the short-lived revolutionary government of Germany in Frankfurt.

In 1851, Donelson became the editor of the Washington Union, a Democratic newspaper. However, as sectionalism became the dominant issue of American politics, Donelson became unpopular with several factions within the Democratic Party, which forced him out in 1852. He then joined the Know Nothing (American) Party.

== Vice-presidential nomination and retirement ==
In 1856, Donelson was nominated as the running mate of former President Millard Fillmore on the Know Nothing (American Party) ticket. Fillmore and Donelson managed to garner over 20% of the popular vote but won only the eight electoral votes of Maryland. He he mentioned in his acceptance speech at the nominating convention that he personally owned 100 slaves and loved the South.

In 1858, Donelson sold Tulip Grove and moved to Memphis, Tennessee. He participated primarily in local politics there, although he was a delegate to the Constitutional Union party's national nominating convention, which selected his old Tennessee nemesis, John Bell, as its presidential candidate.

During the American Civil War, Donelson was harassed by both sides of the conflict and lost two of his sons, both serving the Confederacy, in the war. In 1861 The New York Times charged him with being a Confederate sympathizer. During Reconstruction, he split time between his Memphis home and his plantation in Bolivar County, Mississippi. In his correspondence with his wife, he groused about the need to pay wages to Black workers who had once been enslaved.

He died at the original Peabody Hotel, Memphis, in June 1871 and is buried in Elmwood Cemetery.

== Personal life ==
Donelson married his first cousin, Emily Tennessee Donelson, in 1824. Emily became President Jackson's acting First Lady, but she died of tuberculosis in December 1836. They had four children: Andrew Jackson Donelson Jr. (1826–1859), Mary Emily Donelson (1829–1905), John Samuel Donelson (1832–1863), and Rachel Jackson Donelson (1834–1888).

In 1841, Donelson married his second cousin, Elizabeth (Martin) Randolph (1815–1871). Elizabeth was the widow of Meriwether Lewis Randolph (1810–1837), a son of Martha Jefferson Randolph, and a grandson of Thomas Jefferson. Donelson and his second wife had eight children: Daniel Smith Donelson (1842–1864), Martin Donelson (1847–1889), William Alexander Donelson (1849–1900), Catherine Donelson (1850–1868), Vinet Donelson (1854–1913), Lewis Randolph Donelson (1855–1927), Rosa Elizabeth Donelson (1858–1861), and Andrew Jackson "Budie" Donelson (1860–1915).

Two of Donelson's sons died in the Civil War. John Samuel died at the Battle of Chickamauga, and Daniel Smith was murdered by an unknown assailant.

== Sources ==
- Cheathem, Mark R. (2003). ""I Shall Persevere in the Cause of Truth": Andrew Jackson Donelson and the Election of 1856". Tennessee Historical Quarterly. 62 (3): 218–237. JSTOR 42627765.
- Cheathem, Mark R. (2007). "The High Minded Honourable Man": Honor, Kinship, and Conflict in the Life of Andrew Jackson Donelson". Journal of the Early Republic. 27 (2): 265–292. doi:10.1353/jer.2007.0021. JSTOR 30043498. S2CID 144505766.
- Cheathem, Mark R. (2007). Old Hickory's Nephew: The Political and Private Struggles of Andrew Jackson Donelson Baton Rouge, LA: Louisiana State University Press.
- Owsley, Harriet Chappell (1982). "Andrew Jackson and His Ward, Andrew Jackson Donelson". Tennessee Historical Quarterly. 41 (2): 124–139. JSTOR 42626276.
- Satterfield, Robert Beeler. "Andrew Jackson Donelson: A Moderate Nationalist Jacksonian." Ph.D. diss., Johns Hopkins University, 1961.
- Spence, Richard Douglas (2017). Andrew Jackson Donelson: Jacksonian and Unionist. Nashville: Vanderbilt University Press.

Diplomatic posts
| Preceded by Tilghman Howard | United States Chargé d'Affaires to Texas; 1844–1845 | Position abolished |
| Preceded by Henry Wheaton | United States Envoy to Prussia; 1846–1849 | Succeeded by Edward A. Hannegan |
Party political offices
| Preceded by William Graham | Whig nominee for Vice President of the United States; Endorsed; 1856 | Succeeded by Edward Everett; Constitutional Union |
| Preceded by Reynell Coates | American nominee for Vice President of the United States; 1856 | Party dissolved |
