= United States Attorney for the District of Indiana =

Former U.S. Attorney's office

The United States attorney for the District of Indiana was responsible for representing the United States in the United States District Court for the District of Indiana. The U.S. attorney prosecuted criminal cases and acted on behalf of the federal government both defending and prosecuting civil cases. The District of Indiana was created on March 3, 1817. The longest established district, at 111 years, it was finally divided into the Northern District of Indiana and the Southern District of Indiana on April 21, 1928.

== Office holders ==
- Elijah Sparks 1813–1814 (Indiana Territory)
- William Hendricks 1814–1817 (Indiana Territory)
- Thomas H. Blake 1817–1818
- Alexander A. Meek 1818–1821
- Charles Dewey 1821–1829
- Samuel Judah 1829–1833
- Tilghman Howard 1833–1839
- John Pettit 1839–1841
- Courtland Cushing 1841–1845
- Daniel Mace 1845–1848
- Lucien Barbour 1848–1850
- Hugh O'Neal 1850–1854
- Benjamin Thomas 1854–1856
- Alvin Peterson Hovey 1856–1858
- Daniel W. Voorhees 1858–1861
- John Hanna 1861–1866
- Alfred Kilgore 1866–1869
- Thomas M. Browne 1869–1875
- Nelson Trusler 1876–1880
- Charles L. Holstein 1880–1885
- John Edward Lamb 10 July 1885 – 16 August 1886
- David Turfire 1886–1887
- Emory B. Sellers 1887–1889
- Solomon Claypool 1889
- Smiley N. Chambers 1889–1893
- Frank B. Burke 1893–1897
- Albert W. Wishard 1897–1901
- Joseph B. Kealing 1901–1909
- Charles W. Miller 1909–1913
- Frank C. Dailey 1913–1916
- Lemuel Ertus Slack 1916–1918
- Frederick Van Nuys 1919–1921
- Homer Elliott 1922–1924
- Alexander G. Cavins 1925
- Albert Ward 1925–1928
- George L. Rulison 1928

== See also ==
- List of former United States district courts#Indiana
