= Joseph Eve (politician) =

American politician and diplomat (1784–1843)

3rd Chargé d'Affaires of the United States to Texas
- In office July 21, 1841 – June 3, 1843
- President: John Tyler
- Preceded by: George H. Flood
- Succeeded by: William Sumter Murphy

Personal details
- Born: July 17, 1784 Culpeper County, Virginia, United States
- Died: June 16, 1843 (aged 58) Galveston, Republic of Texas
- Spouse: Betsey Withers Ballinger
- Occupation: Lawyer, politician

Military service
- Allegiance: United States
- Branch/service: United States Army
- Rank: Colonel
- Battles/wars: War of 1812

Joseph Eve (July 17, 1784 – June 16, 1843) was an American politician and diplomat. He was born in Culpeper County, Virginia. As a young man he moved to Knox County, Kentucky. He married Betsey Withers Ballinger in 1811; they had no children. He was a lawyer in Kentucky and was elected to the Kentucky House of Representatives three times. He was a colonel in the United States Army during the War of 1812, and later served four years as a senator in the Kentucky Senate. He was a circuit court judge for a period of ten years.

On April 15, 1841, Eve was appointed to post of Chargé d'affaires for the United States mission to the Republic of Texas. He was a strong advocate of U.S. annexation of the then-independent Republic. During this time, conflict between Texas and Mexico grew, and the provisional Republic seat of government was relocated several times. Eve moved his legation to Galveston, Texas, hoping to benefit from the climate, as his tuberculosis was getting worse. However, in early June 1843, he was released from his assignment, succeeded by William Sumter Murphy, on June 16. The same day, Eve died of tuberculosis, after which his widow relocated to their residence in Kentucky.

Diplomatic posts
Preceded by George H. Flood	Chargé d'affaires of U.S. Mission to Texas; 1841–1843	Succeeded by William Sumter Murphy
