= Charles Magill Conrad =

American politician (1804–1878)

Charles Conrad
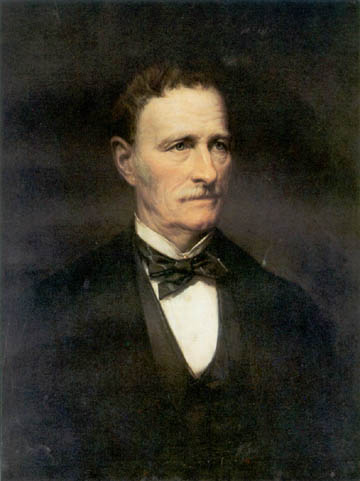

Member of the Confederate House of Representatives from Louisiana's 2nd district
- In office February 18, 1862 – March 18, 1865
- Preceded by: Constituency established
- Succeeded by: Constituency abolished

Acting United States Secretary of State
- In office October 25, 1852 – November 5, 1852
- President: Millard Fillmore
- Preceded by: Daniel Webster
- Succeeded by: Edward Everett

22nd United States Secretary of War
- In office August 15, 1850 – March 7, 1853
- President: Millard Fillmore
- Preceded by: George W. Crawford
- Succeeded by: Jefferson Davis

Member of the U.S. House of Representatives from Louisiana's 2nd district
- In office March 4, 1849 – August 17, 1850
- Preceded by: Bannon Thibodeaux
- Succeeded by: Henry Bullard

United States Senator from Louisiana
- In office April 14, 1842 – March 3, 1843
- Appointed by: Andre B. Roman
- Preceded by: Alexandre Mouton
- Succeeded by: Alexander Porter

Personal details
- Born: Charles Magill Conrad; December 24, 1804 Winchester, Virginia, U.S.
- Died: February 11, 1878 (aged 73) New Orleans, Louisiana, U.S.
- Party: Whig

Charles Magill Conrad (December 24, 1804 – February 11, 1878) was a Louisiana politician who served in the United States Senate, United States House of Representatives, and Confederate Congress. He was Secretary of War under President Millard Fillmore and, briefly, Franklin Pierce, from 1850 until 1853. Conrad also briefly acted as the United States Secretary of State following the tenure of Daniel Webster.

== Biography ==
Charles Magill Conrad was born in Winchester, Virginia, in 1804, moved to Mississippi with his family as a boy, and later moved to Louisiana. He was educated under a Dr. Huld in New Orleans. He served in the Louisiana House of Representatives from 1839–1840. He was appointed to the U.S. Senate in April 1842 to fill the unexpired term of Alexandre Mouton, serving to March 1843, and was defeated for reelection in his own right. He later served in the House of Representatives from 1849 to 1850, resigning to accept appointment as Secretary of War in Fillmore's cabinet. Conrad remained in charge of the War Department from August 15, 1850, to March 7, 1853. He was a leader of the secession movement in Louisiana in December 1860. During the American Civil War, under the Confederate States of America, he served as a delegate to the Provisional Constitution of the Confederate States as a member of the Provisional Congress of the Confederate States, and as a representative from Louisiana to the Confederate Congress, 1862–1864. Following the war, he resumed the practice of law. He died in New Orleans in 1878.

== See also ==
- List of United States senators from Louisiana

U.S. Senate
Preceded by Alexandre Mouton	U.S. senator (Class 3) from Louisiana; 1842–1843; Served alongside: Alexander Barrow	Succeeded by Alexander Porter
U.S. House of Representatives
Preceded by Bannon Goforth Thibodeaux	Member of the U.S. House of Representatives from Louisiana's 2nd congressional district 1849–1850	Succeeded by Henry Bullard
Political offices
Preceded by George Crawford	U.S. Secretary of War; Served under: Millard Fillmore; 1850–1853	Succeeded by Jefferson Davis
New constituency	Deputy from Louisiana to the Provisional Congress of the Confederate States; 1861–1862	Constituency abolished
