= 1860 Constitutional Union Convention =

U.S. political event held in Baltimore, Maryland

1860 Constitutional Union National Convention
- 1860 presidential election
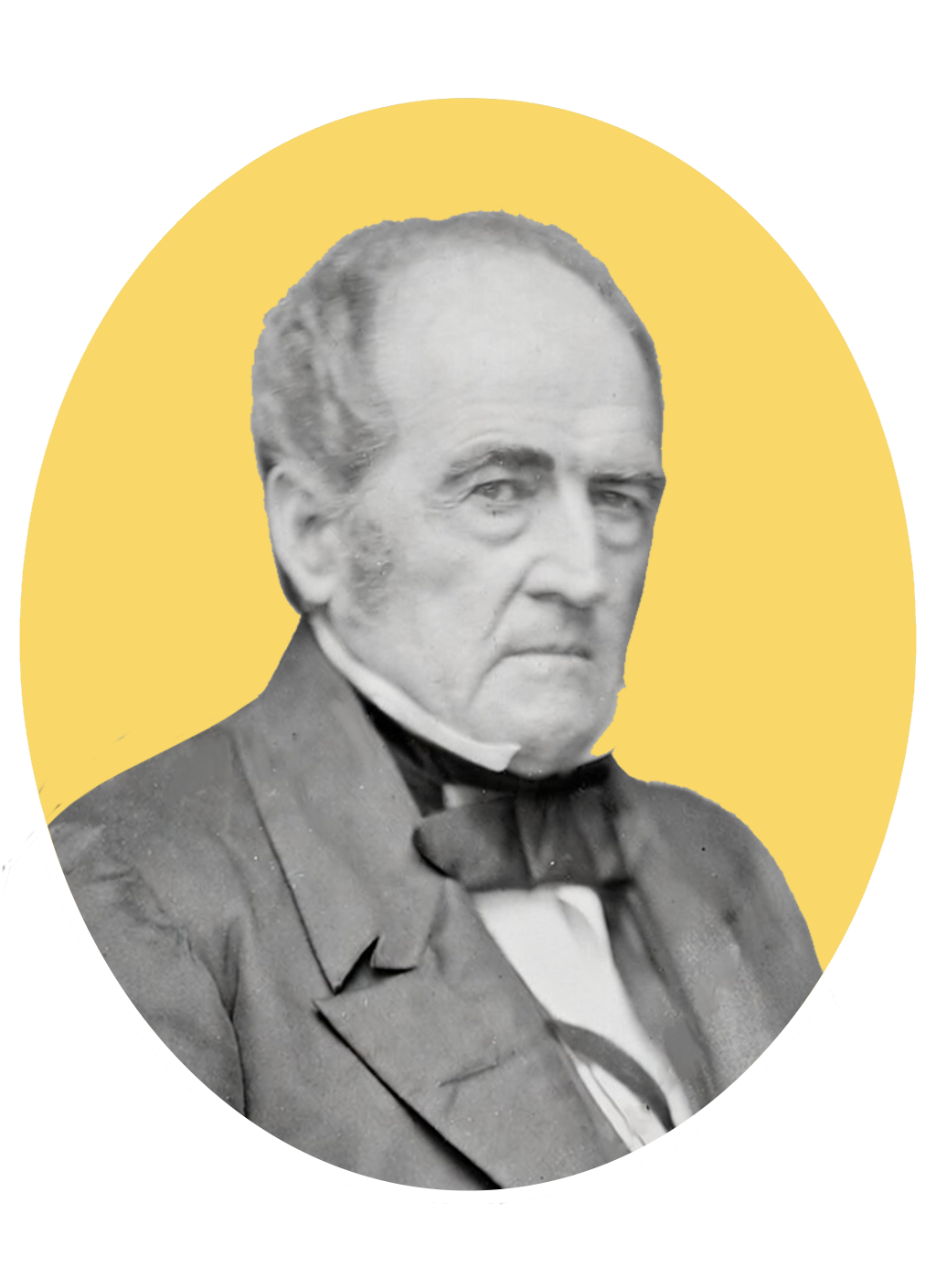
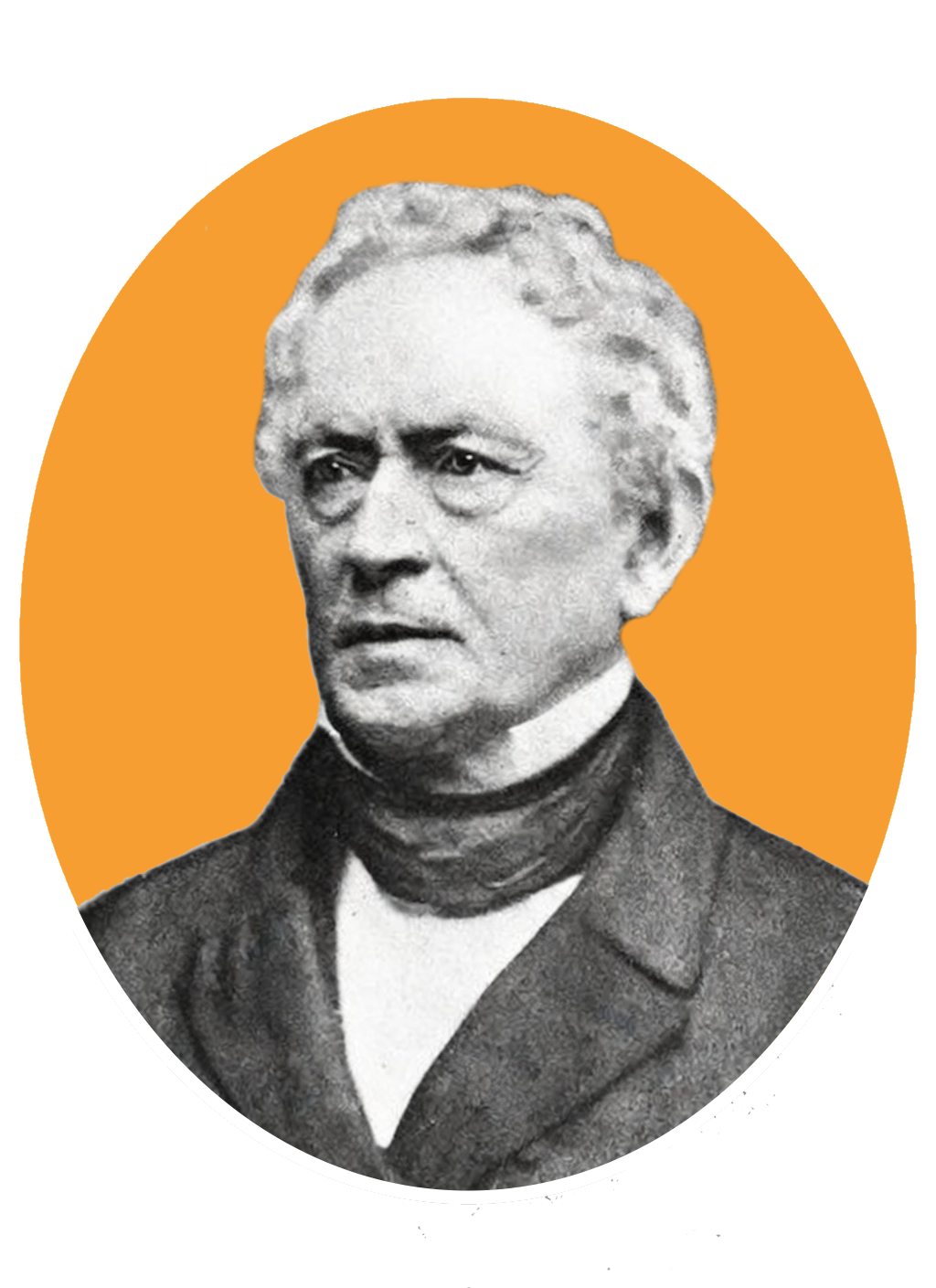
- Nominees; Bell and Everett

Convention
- Dates: May 9–10, 1860
- City: Baltimore, Maryland
- Venue: Old First Presbyterian Church

Candidates
- Presidential nominee: John Bell of Tennessee
- Vice-presidential nominee: Edward Everett of Massachusetts

The 1860 Constitutional Union National Convention met on May 9, 1860, in Baltimore, Maryland. It was the only national convention ever held by the Constitutional Union Party, which was organized largely by former Whig Party members from the Southern United States who opposed secession. The convention nominated former Senator John Bell of Tennessee for president and former Secretary of State Edward Everett of Massachusetts for vice president.

Bell won the presidential nomination on the second ballot of the convention, defeating Everett, Governor Sam Houston of Texas, Senator John J. Crittenden of Kentucky, former Governor William Alexander Graham of North Carolina, Associate Justice John McLean of Ohio, and several other candidates. In the 1860 presidential election, Bell and Everett finished third in the electoral vote and fourth in the popular vote.

== Background ==
After the passage of the Kansas-Nebraska Act in 1854, the Whigs collapsed due to divisions over slavery. Many Northern Whigs shifted to the new Republican Party, while many Southern Whigs joined the American Party, or "Know Nothings." By 1859, the Know Nothing movement had collapsed, but some former Southern Whigs who refused to join their long-time rivals in the Democratic Party had organized themselves into the "Opposition Party." Several of this party's supporters, among them Knoxville Whig editor William Brownlow, former vice presidential candidate Andrew Jackson Donelson, and California attorney Balie Peyton sought to launch a third-party presidential ticket.

In May 1860, disgruntled ex-Whigs and disenchanted moderates from across the country convened in Baltimore, where they formed the Constitutional Union Party. The party's platform was very broad and made no mention of slavery. While there were several candidates for the party's presidential nomination, the two frontrunners were Bell and Sam Houston.

== Presidential nomination ==
=== Presidential candidates ===
John Bell, Tennessee
former U.S. Senator

Sam Houston, Texas
Governor

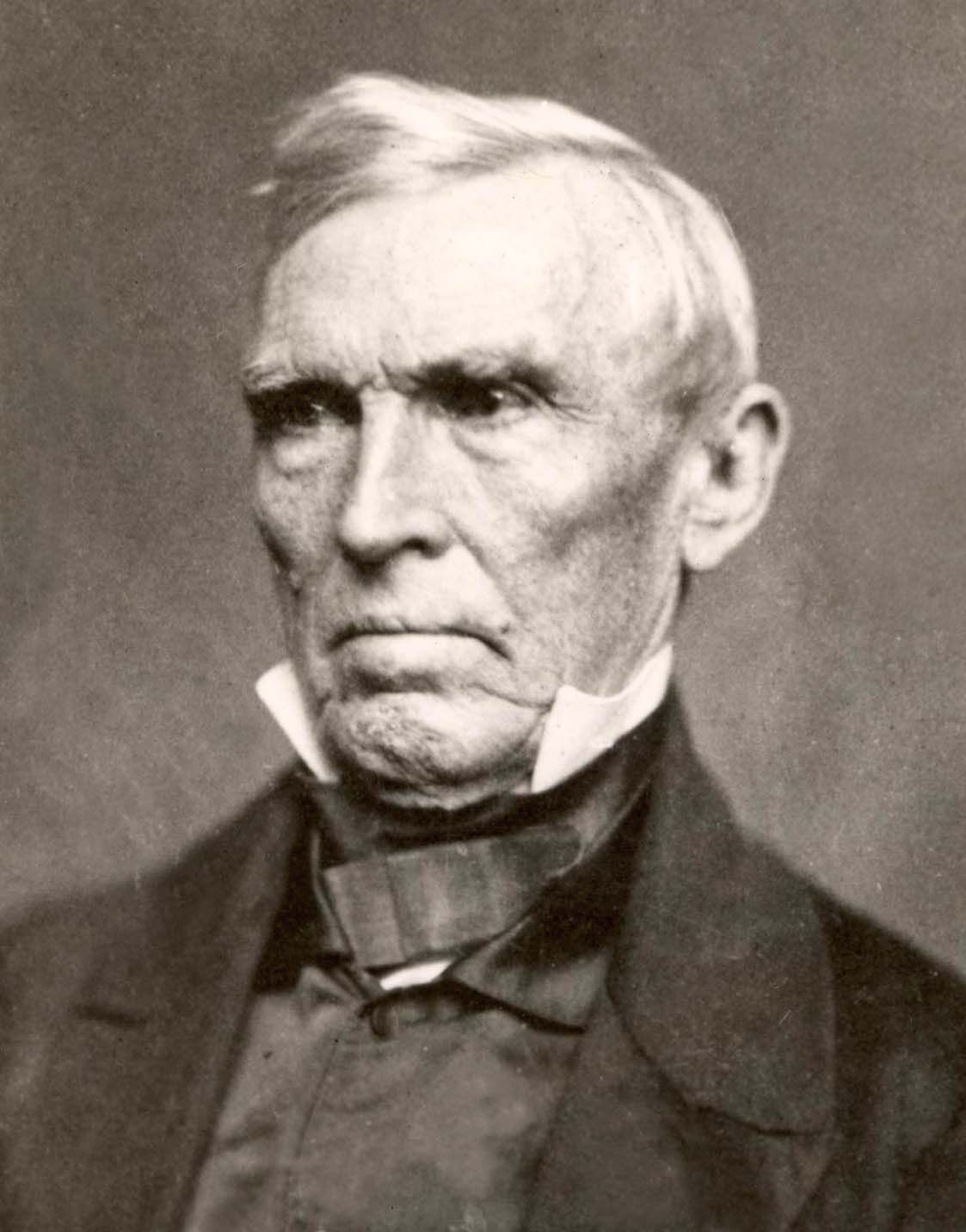
John J. Crittenden, Kentucky
U.S. Senator

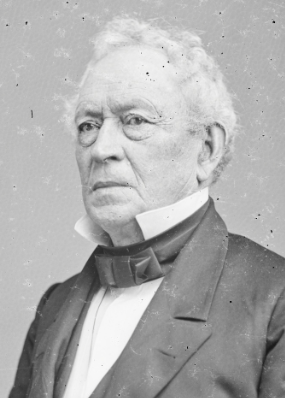
Edward Everett, Massachusetts
former U.S. Senator

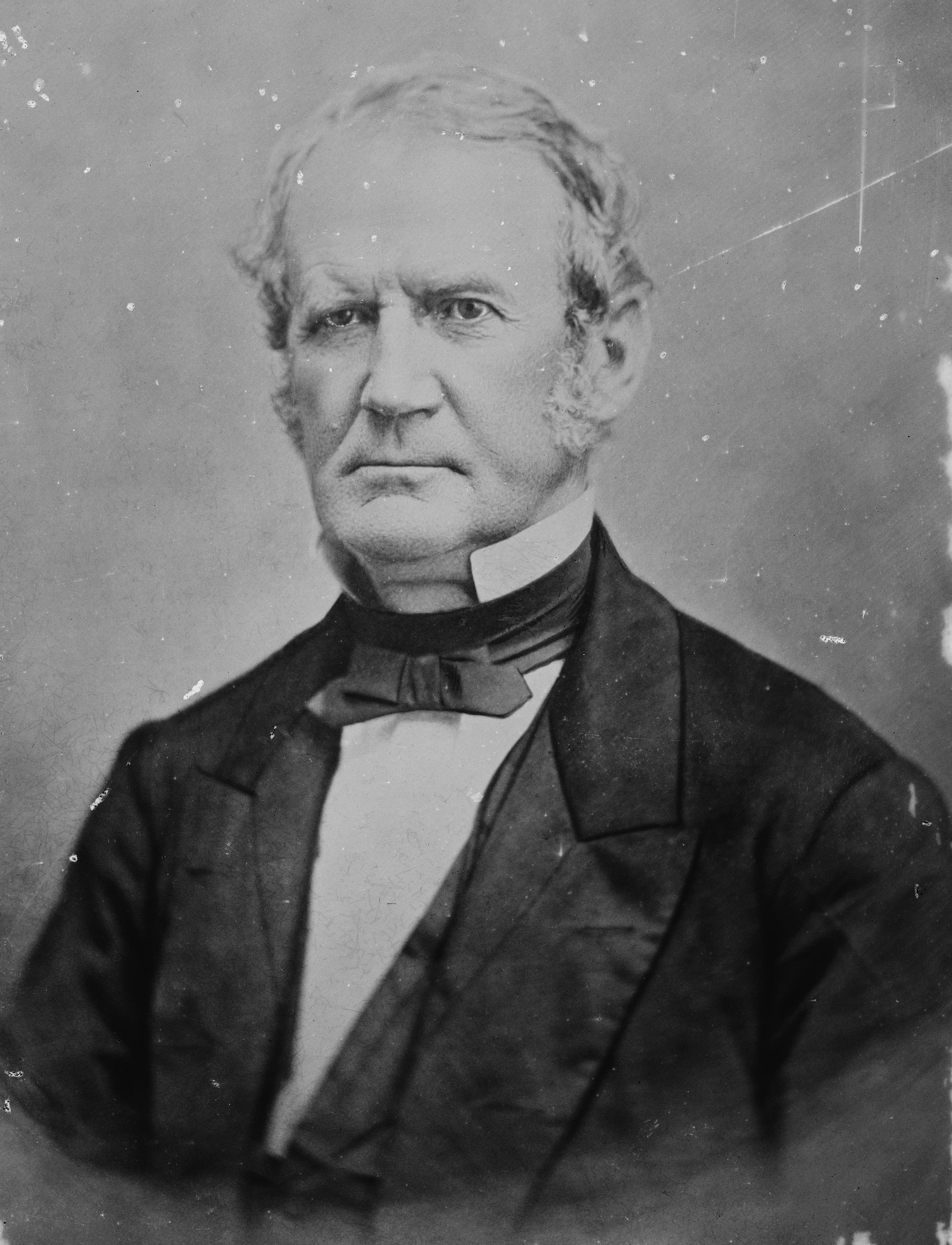
William A. Graham, North Carolina
former U.S. Senator

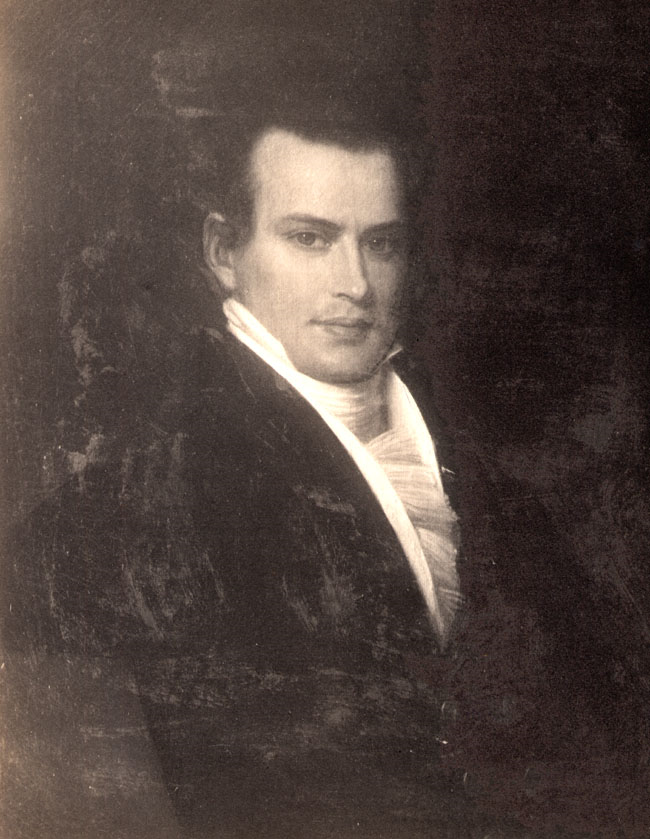
William C. Rives, Virginia
former U.S. Senator

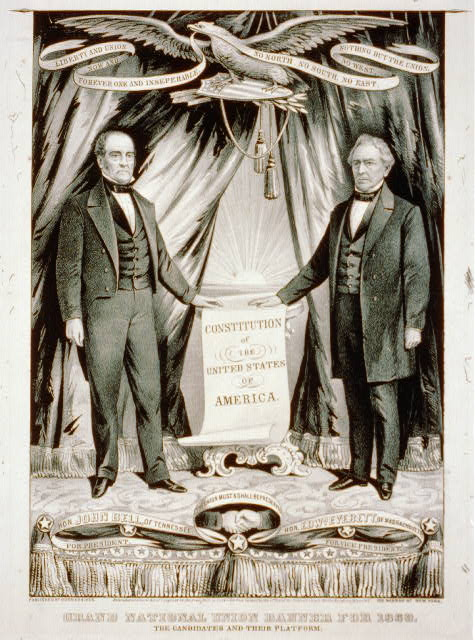
A Constitutional Union campaign poster, 1860, portraying John Bell and Edward Everett, respectively the candidates for president and vice president. Once Lincoln was inaugurated, and called up the militia, Bell supported the secession of Tennessee. In 1863, Everett dedicated the new cemetery at Gettysburg.

Bell led the initial round of balloting with 68.5 votes to Houston's 59. The remainder of the votes were split among eight other candidates. Houston's military endeavors had brought him national renown, but he reminded the convention's Clay Whigs of their old foe Andrew Jackson. On May 10, Bell received 139 votes to Houston's 69, and was declared the candidate.

Presidential Ballot
Ballot	1st	2nd (Before Shifts)
Bell	68.5	139
Houston	57	69
Crittenden	28	1
Everett	25	9.5
Graham	22	18.5
McLean	21	1
Rives	13	0
Botts	9.5	7.5
Sharkey	7	8.5
Goggin	3	0
Not Represented	49	49

Presidential Balloting / 2nd Day of Convention (May 10, 1860)

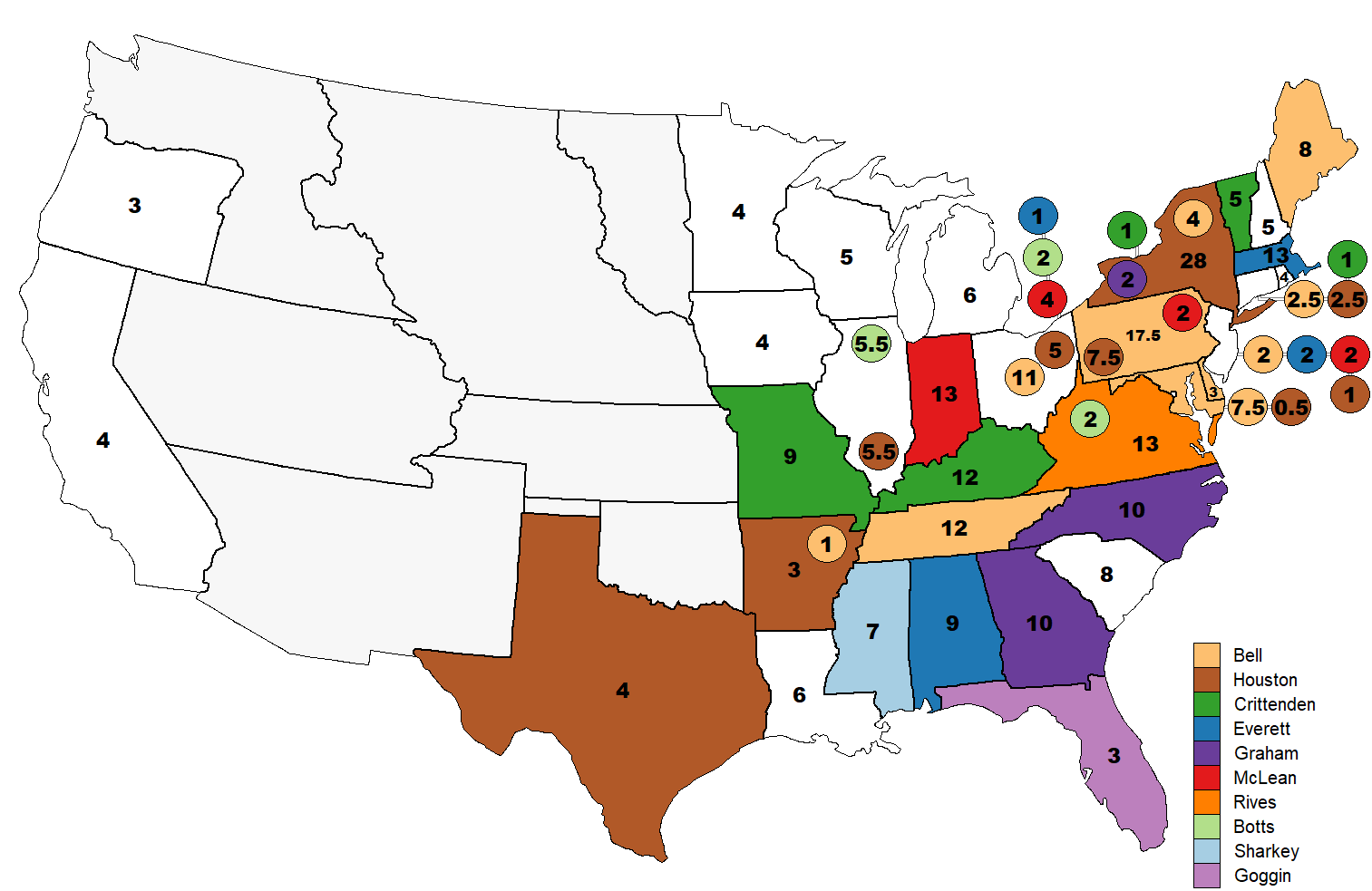
1st Presidential Ballot

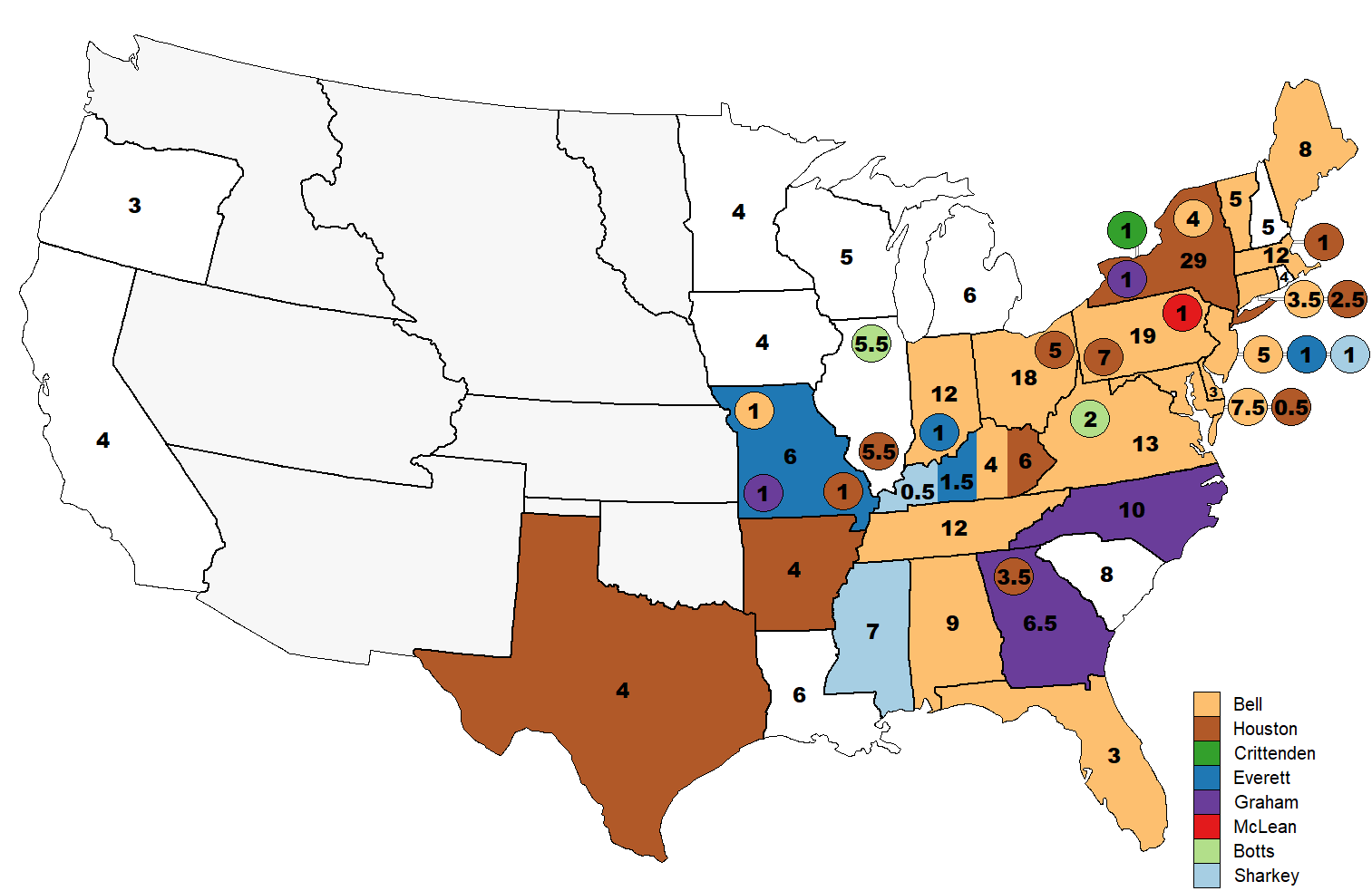
2nd Presidential Ballot
(Before Shifts)

== Vice presidential nomination ==
=== Vice presidential candidates ===
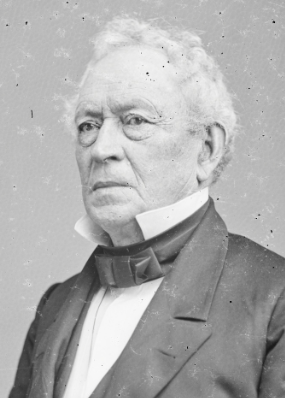
Former Senator
Edward Everett
of Massachusetts

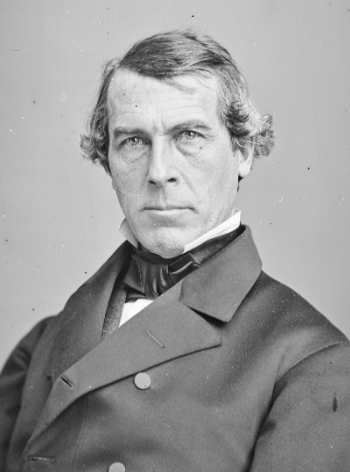
Former Governor
Washington Hunt
of New York
(Withdrawn)

The vice presidential nomination went to Edward Everett of Massachusetts, who had served as president of Harvard University and as Secretary of State in the Fillmore administration. Everett was nominated by acclaimation.
