= Albert W. Wishard =

American attorney and politician

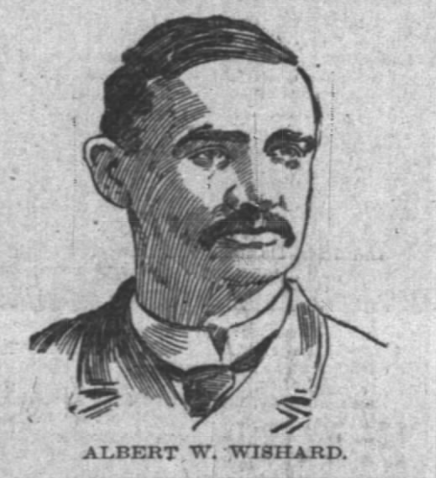
- A drawn portrait of Albert Wishard in 1897

Indiana State Senate

27th United States Attorney for the District of Indiana
- In office 1897–1901
- President: William McKinley
- Preceded by: Frank B. Burke
- Succeeded by: Joseph B. Kealing

Personal details
- Born: c. 1854 Greenwood, Indiana, U.S.
- Died: July 11, 1917 (aged 62–63) Indianapolis, Indiana, U.S.
- Cause of death: Dilated cardiomyopathy
- Resting place: Crown Hill Cemetery and Arboretum, Section 14, Lot 99
- Citizenship: United States
- Party: Republican
- Spouse(s): Carrie Wallace (1888-1889) (1906–death)
- Parent(s): Harriet (née Moreland) & William Henry Wishard
- Education: Wabash College 1876
- Occupation: Lawyer; Campaign manager

Albert W. Wishard (c. 1854-July 11, 1917) was an American attorney and politician. Wishard served in the Indiana State Senate for two terms and was a United States Attorney. A Republican, Wishard was also the campaign manager for Charles W. Fairbanks two Senate campaigns.

== Early life and education ==
Albert W. Wishard was born in about 1854 in Greenwood, Indiana. His father was physician W. H. Wishard and his mother was Harriet (née Moreland) Wishard. Wishard had one sister, Elizabeth. When Wishard was ten, his family moved to Marion County, settling in Southport. He attended Wabash College and graduated in 1876. Wishard studied law at John Coburn's law firm.

== Career and life in politics ==
After passing the bar, Wishard was partner in John Coburn's firm, Test & Coburn, followed by being a partner with J. E. Florea. He eventually founded his own firm.

=== Politics ===
In 1884, Wishard ran for the Indiana House of Representatives as a Republican representing Marion, Shelby and Bartholomew Counties. In 1888, he married Carrie Wallace in Indianapolis. One year later, in 1889, Wallace filed to divorce Wishard. The couple divorced, and Wishard would keep in touch with Wallace via letters.

In 1900, Wishard was appointed solicitor for the Internal Revenue Service (IRS) by President William McKinley. On March 1, 1903, Wishard resigned from his position as solicitor for the IRS. He left Washington and moved back to Indianapolis where he returned to his law practice. In 1906, he and Carrie Wallace agreed to marry and eloped in Chicago with Wallace's mother as a witness.

== Later life and death ==
Wishard died in Indianapolis on July 11, 1917, from dilated cardiomyopathy. He was buried at Crown Hill Cemetery.

== Legacy ==
Wishard's correspondence is held in the collection of the Indiana State Library.
