= Mexico–Republic of Texas relations =

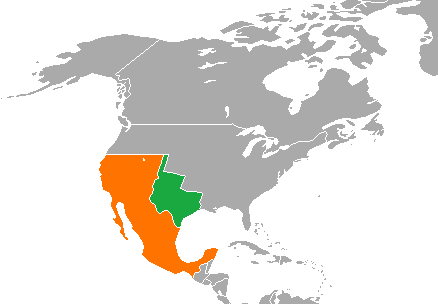

- Texas: Mexico

Foreign relations between Mexico and the Republic of Texas were unofficially initiated in 1836 at the signing of the Treaties of Velasco, which de facto declared Texas independent from Mexico, though the Mexican Government never fully recognized Texas' Independence. The relations between the two countries, however hostile, continued until 1845 after the annexation of Texas by the United States, and the beginning of the Mexican–American War.

The transfer of power from the Republic to the new state of Texas formally took place on February 19, 1846.

== Mexican Texas ==
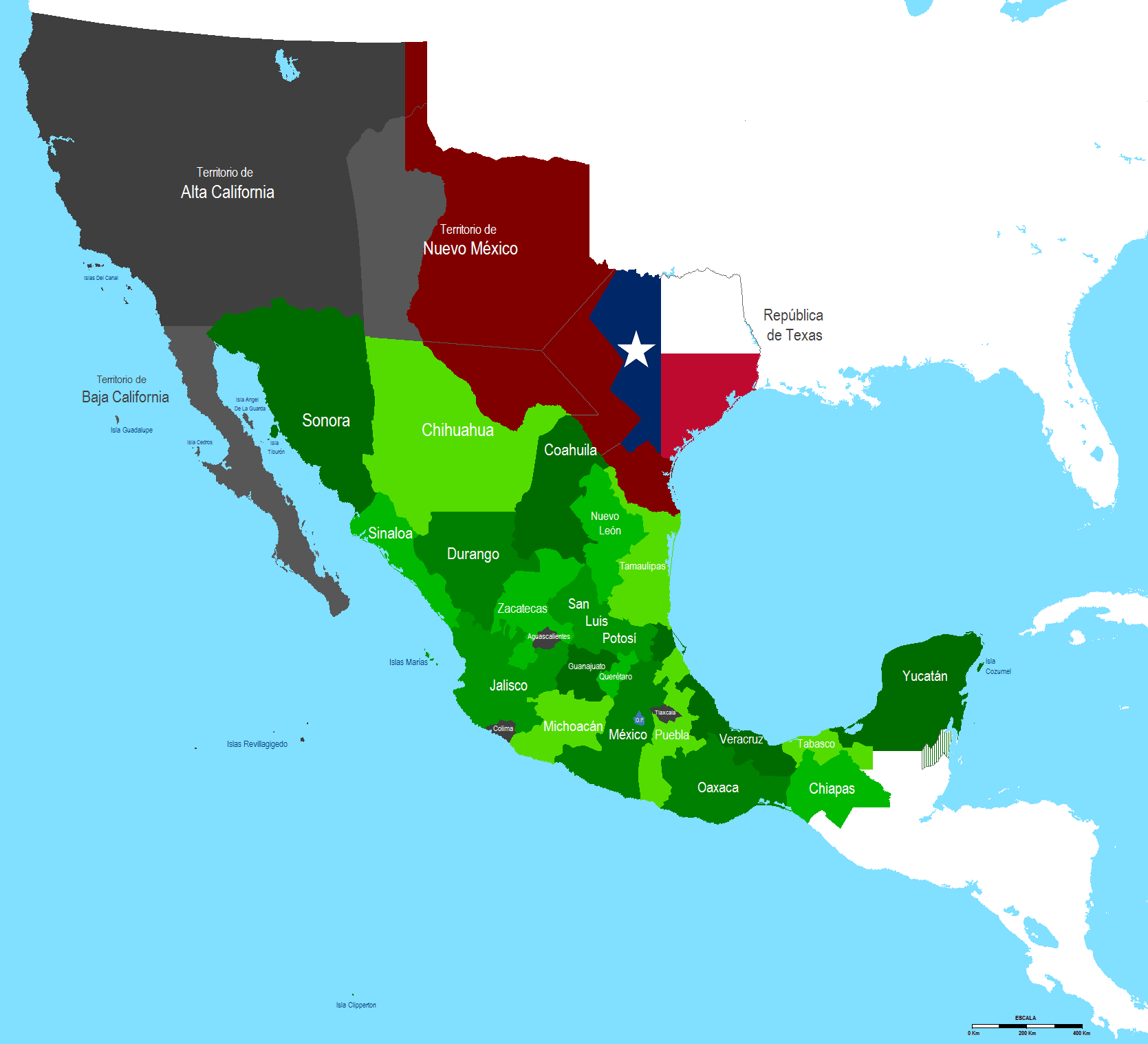
Independent Texas shown by Texan Flag, Mexican territory claimed by Texas shown in Velvet Red.

Before Texas was a Republic it was a Mexican Territory, with a population of just 4000 Tejanos. By 1824, the Mexican government, desperate to populate the region, invited Americans to settle the region under the requirement and assumption that the settlers would learn the Spanish Language, convert to Roman Catholicism, and be loyal to the Mexican government. In 1829, U.S. President Andrew Jackson made a failed attempt to buy Texas from Mexico for $5 million. By 1832 the number of American settlers topped 30,000; very few of the settlers obeyed any of the three compromises, and most had also brought slavery into Texas, which was against Mexican law. When the government began to enforce the ban on slavery, desire for secession reached its peak, eventually leading to the Texas Revolution, and de facto Texan independence.

== Continuation of conflict after Texan Independence ==
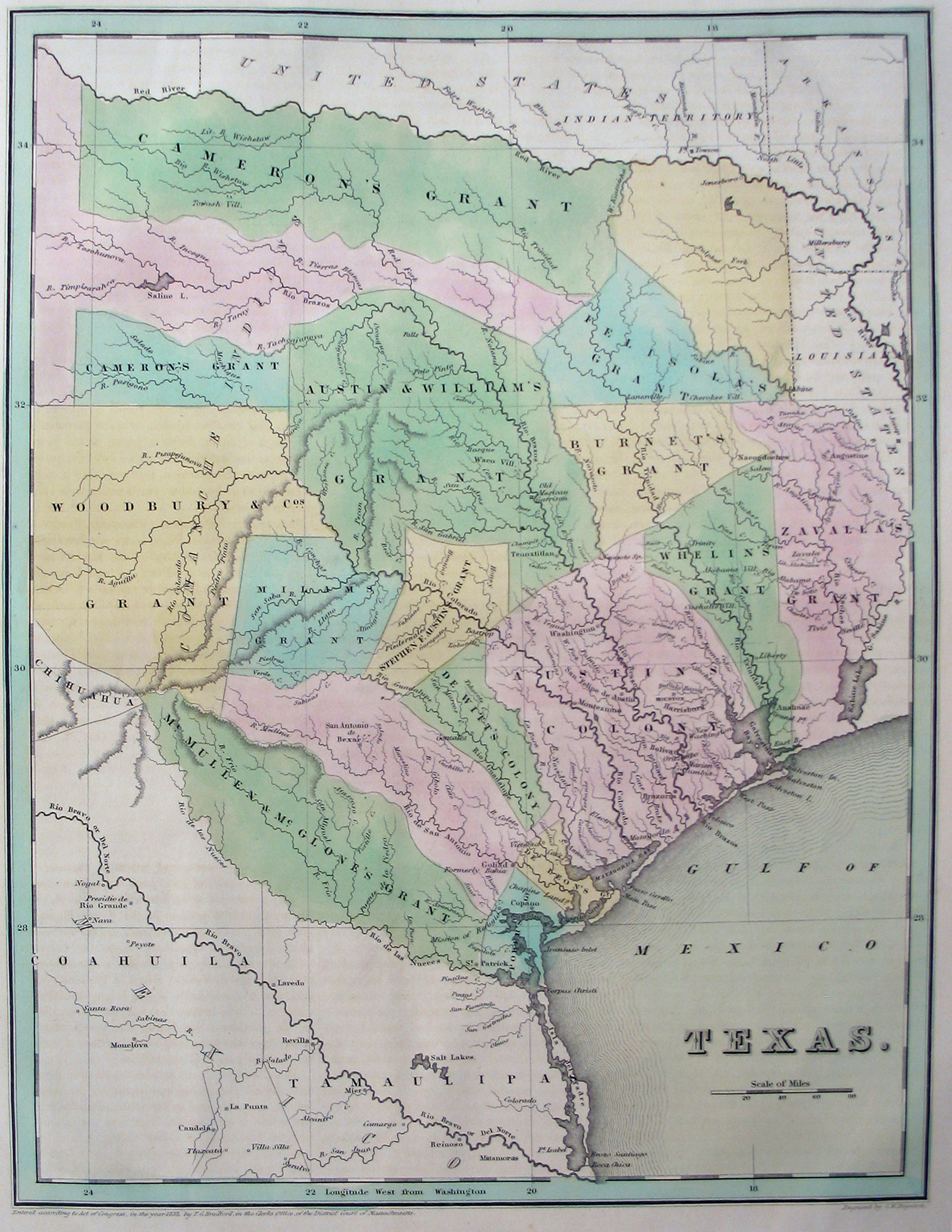
Thomas Gamaliel Bradford's 1838 map of the Republic of Texas, showing the Nueces River as its southern boundary

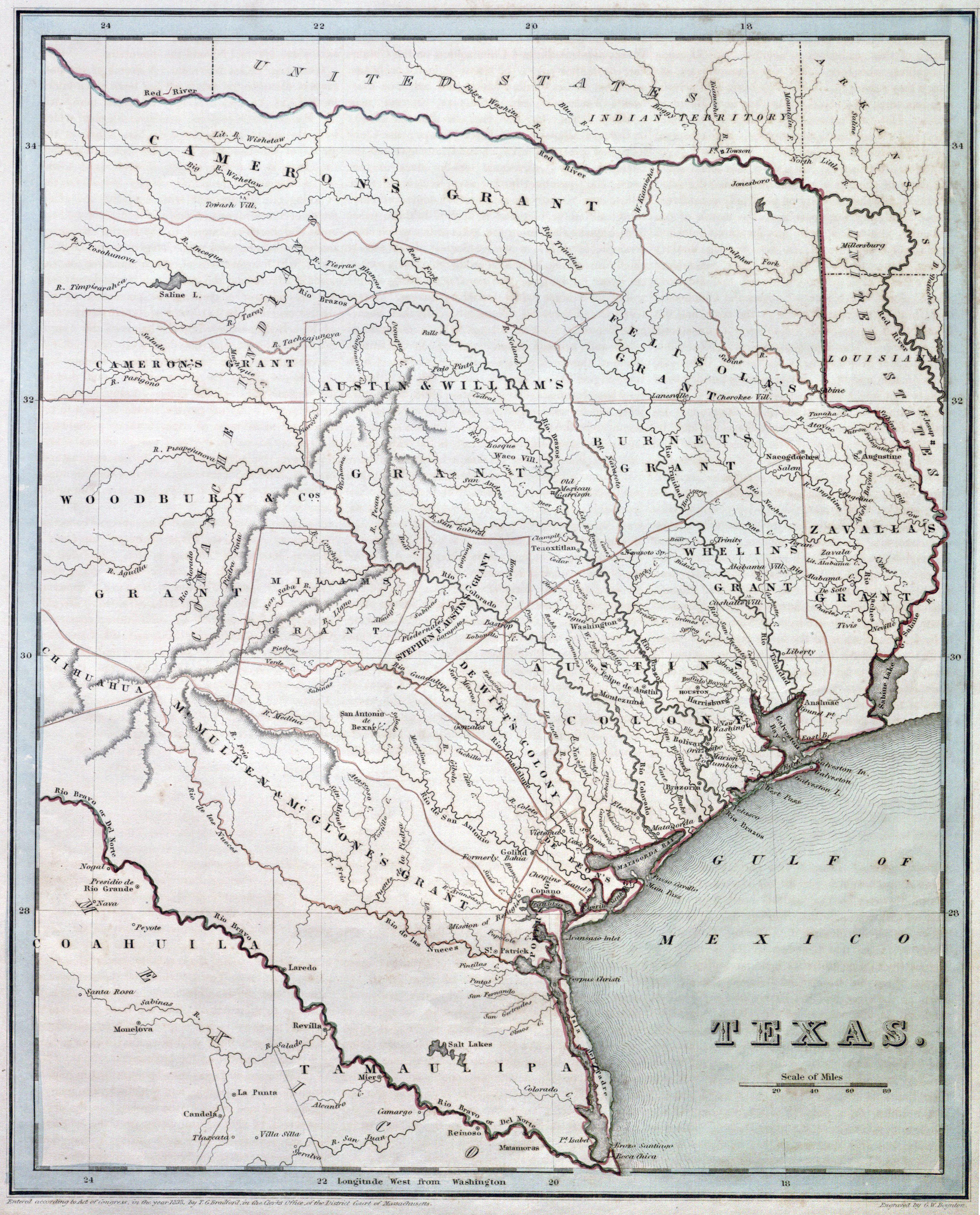
A different version of Bradford's 1838 map, showing the Rio Grande as Texas's southern boundary

Although General Santa Anna surrendered to the Texans, disputes between the two nations did not end. Texas claimed large portions of New Mexico they never occupied, and Mexico never gave up attempts to take back land from Texas.

== Mexican Recognition of Texan Independence ==
Mexico never recognized Texas' independence. Instead, the Mexican government considered Texas a rebellious territory still belonging to the Mexican federation. By 1838, though Texas consolidated a firm hold over its eastern lands, a majority of territory claimed under the Treaty of Velasco remained under either Indian hegemony or Mexican control. Texas claimed the official southern and western border between the two countries to be the Rio Grande, while Mexico considered it a ridiculous compromise to even allow the eastern part of Texas to remain independent and insisted any border that may exist was at the Nueces. Mexico's army made frequent attempts to reclaim its territory of Texas.

== Texas-Mexico Relations and the Path to U.S. Annexation ==
For most of the republic's existence, formal diplomatic relations were absent between Texas and Mexico. Texas made multiple attempts to obtain Mexican recognition of its independence. In 1839, President Mirabeau B. Lamar sent diplomatic representatives to seek recognition, a peace treaty, and agreement on the Rio Grande as the boundary; the negotiations were unsuccessful. Relations between the two sides remained tense, and Mexican military incursions into Texas occurred again in 1842. In 1845, Mexico agreed to recognize Texas independence as part of a proposed peace settlement; however, the Texas Congress rejected the offer and accepted annexation by the United States.

== Bibliography ==
- Vigness, David M. (January 1954). Relations of the Republic of Texas and the Republic of the Rio Grande. Vol. 57. Texas State Historical Association. pp. 213–321.

== See also ==
- Republic of Texas–United States relations
- Texas Revolution
- Mexican Texas
- Republic of the Rio Grande
