= Bannon G. Thibodeaux =

American politician

Member of the U.S. House of Representatives from Louisiana's 2nd district
- In office March 4, 1845 – March 3, 1849
- Preceded by: Alcée Louis la Branche
- Succeeded by: Charles Magill Conrad

Personal details
- Born: Bannon Goforth Thibodeaux; December 22, 1812 Thibodaux, Louisiana, US
- Died: March 5, 1866 (aged 53) Terrebonne Parish, Louisiana, US
- Party: Whig

Bannon Goforth Thibodeaux (December 22, 1812 – March 5, 1866) was an American lawyer and politician who served as a member of the U. S. House of Representatives representing the state of Louisiana. He served two terms as a Whig from 1845 to 1849.

== Biography ==
Thibodeaux was born on St. Bridget Plantation near Thibodaux in Lafourche Parish. He was the son of Governor Henry S. Thibodaux.

He attended the country schools, then studied law in Hagerstown, Maryland. He was admitted to the bar and commenced practice in LaFourche and Terrebonne Parishes in Louisiana.

=== Political career ===
He was member of the State constitutional conventions in 1845 and 1852, and held several local offices before being elected to the Twenty-ninth and Thirtieth Congresses, serving from March 4, 1845, to March 3, 1849).

=== Later career ===
After leaving Congress, he resumed the practice of law in Terrebonne and Lafourche Parishes. He was also a sugar planter and manufacturer.

=== Death ===
He died March 5, 1866, in Terrebonne Parish. His body is interred in the Half-way Cemetery, near Houma, Louisiana.

U.S. House of Representatives
Preceded by Alcée Louis la Branche	Member of the U.S. House of Representatives from Louisiana's 2nd congressional district 1845 – 1849	Succeeded by Charles Magill Conrad
