= George H. Flood =

American diplomat

2nd Chargé d'Affaires of the United States to Texas
- In office June 21, 1840 – July 21, 1841
- President: Martin Van Buren; William Henry Harrison; John Tyler
- Preceded by: Alcée Louis la Branche
- Succeeded by: Joseph Eve

Member of the Ohio House of Representatives from the Licking County district
- In office 1838–1839

Personal details
- Born: George H. Flood Virginia, United States
- Died: August 6, 1841 Galveston, Republic of Texas
- Cause of death: Congestive fever
- Citizenship: United States
- Party: Democratic
- Occupation: Politician

George H. Flood was an American politician and diplomat who served as the second American chargé d'affaires to Texas in 1840 and 1841.

A native of Virginia, Flood served as a Democratic state representative for Licking County in 1838 and 1839. During his time as a state representative, Flood was a strident opponent of abolitionism, believing it to be inimical to the United States system of government. Earlier, he served as the Clerk of the Ohio House of Representatives.

Nominated by President Martin Van Buren to become the American chargé d'affaires to Texas, he was confirmed by the Senate and presented his credentials in June 1840. Even though his term lasted only thirteen months, he still outlasted Van Buren and his successor, William Henry Harrison. Only when John Tyler became president, was Flood recalled, removed, and replaced by Joseph Eve in July 1841.

Flood died on August 6, 1841, of "congestive fever"; like both of his successors, he died in Galveston, in the Republic of Texas, never having returned to American soil.

Diplomatic posts
Preceded by Alcée Louis la Branche	Chargé d'affaires of U.S. Mission to Texas; 1840-1841	Succeeded by Joseph Eve
