= Alcée Louis la Branche =

American politician

Member of the U.S. House of Representatives from Louisiana's 2nd district
- In office March 4, 1843 – March 3, 1845
- Preceded by: John Bennett Dawson
- Succeeded by: Bannon Goforth Thibodeaux

1st United States Chargé d'Affaires in Texas
- In office October 23, 1837 – June 5, 1840
- President: Martin Van Buren
- Preceded by: Diplomatic relations established
- Succeeded by: George H. Flood

Member of the Louisiana House of Representatives
- In office 1837

Personal details
- Born: 1806 Near New Orleans, Orleans Territory, United States
- Died: August 17, 1861 (aged 54–55) Hot Springs, Virginia, Confederate States
- Party: Democratic

Alcée Louis la Branche (1806 – August 17, 1861) was an American politician who served as a member of the U.S. House of Representatives from the state of Louisiana. He served one term as a Democrat from 1843 to 1845.

== Biography ==
La Branche was born near New Orleans, the son of Alexandre La Branche (a Revolutionary War regimental commander whose family had emigrated to Louisiana from Bavaria and had changed its surname from the German "Zweig" to the French "Branche," with both names meaning "branch") and Marie Jeanne Piseros (whose family was of Spanish ancestry). La Branche attended the Université de Sorèze in Sorèze (France).

La Branche was a slaveholder.

=== Political career ===
He served as Speaker of the House of the Louisiana State House of Representatives in 1833 and later served as Chargé d'Affaires to the Republic of Texas. He served in Congress from 1843 until 1845.

=== Death ===
He died in Hot Springs, Virginia.

== See also ==
- List of Hispanic and Latino Americans in the United States Congress

Political offices
Preceded by Alexandre Mouton	Speakers of the Louisiana House of Representatives; 1833–1837	Succeeded by Joseph Marshall Walker
Diplomatic posts
New title Mission established	United States Chargé d'Affairs to Texas; 1837–1840	Succeeded by George H. Flood
U.S. House of Representatives
Preceded by John Bennett Dawson	Member of the U.S. House of Representatives from Louisiana's 2nd congressional district 1843–1845	Succeeded by Bannon Goforth Thibodeaux
