= Samuel Judah (jurist) =

American lawyer and politician

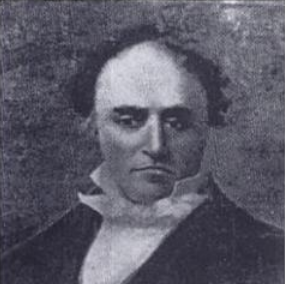
Samuel Judah 1799-1869

Samuel Judah (1798/9 – April 29, 1869) was an American lawyer and politician. Born either July 10, 1788, or July 18, 1799, son of Benjamin S. Judah, a medical doctor, he graduated in 1816 in Law from Rutgers University (then Queen's College) the first Jew to do so. He was called to the bar the same year. He lived in Vincennes, Indiana, but practiced law nationally. He was elected to the Indiana House of Representatives from 1827 to 1829. In 1830 he was the United States Attorney for the District of Indiana. He was once again in the House of Representatives from 1839 to 1841, and was Speaker of the Indiana House of Representatives in 1840.

== Family ==
Judah married Harriet Brandon (1808–1884) on June 22, 1825. They had one son Samuel Brandon Judah (b. 1845). Of ten children born, four died in infancy and six survived to adulthood. The 1860 census lists sons, Samuel, John, and Nobel and her daughter, Alice, who was then 23. Six children survived to adulthood. Caroline married John Mantle. Catherine married General Lazarus Nobel. Alice married Franklin Clark. Samuel B. Judah married first Emily Burnett and then Prudence Keplinger. John Mantle Judah married Mary Saunders Jameson. Nobel Branson Judah married Karherin Hutchinson.

== Legacy ==
Judah left an archive of some 1,000 letters. The law firm that Samuel Judah established has continued uninterrupted for 200 years.
