= Joseph Washington Eliot Wallace =

Joseph Washington Eliot Wallace (some records refer to him as Washington instead of Worthington) was an early settler of the United States born on April 8, 1796, in Philadelphia, Pennsylvania.

Joseph Wallace served in the Seminole War in Florida then lived in Mississippi where he became a colonel in the Mississippi Militia. He married Harriet Hazleton Hoyt, they had one son named William Hazelton Wallace. Harriet died in 1828 and their son later died during the American civil war while serving with the Confederacy at Sabine Pass. In 1830, Wallace moved to Texas, which was under Mexican rule at that time and appointed as a United States consul, then settled in Matagorda County, and had a land grant as one of the settlers of the Stephen F. Austin colony. He held the rank of Lieutenant Colonel and fought in the Battle of Gonzales in 1835 and Plum Creek in 1840.

He died in Columbus, Texas on August 24,1877 but in 1955, his body reinterred in Texas State Cemetery in Austin.
