= Texas Legation =

Diplomatic representative offices of the Republic of Texas

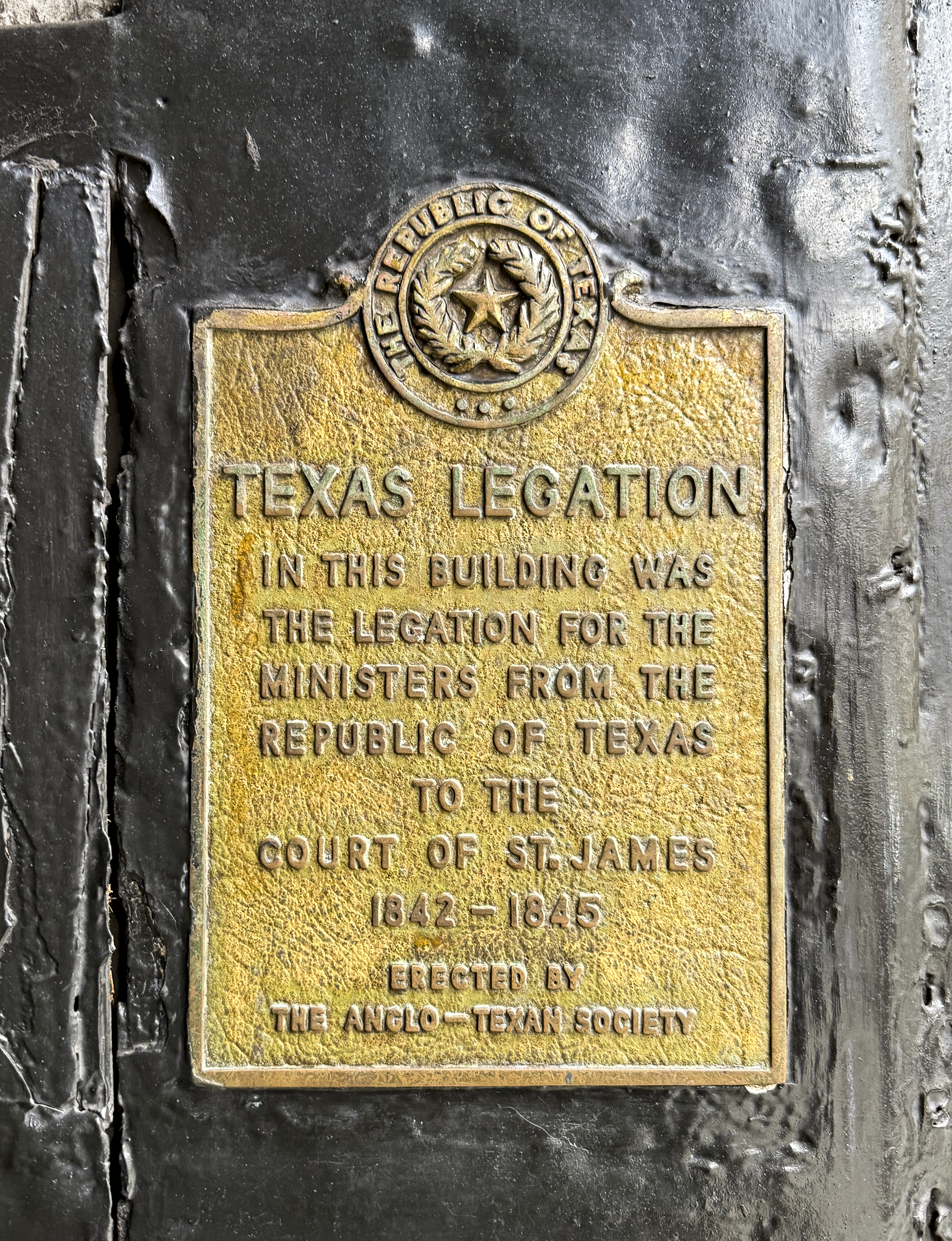
Commemorative plaque showing final location of Texas Legation in London from 1842-1845

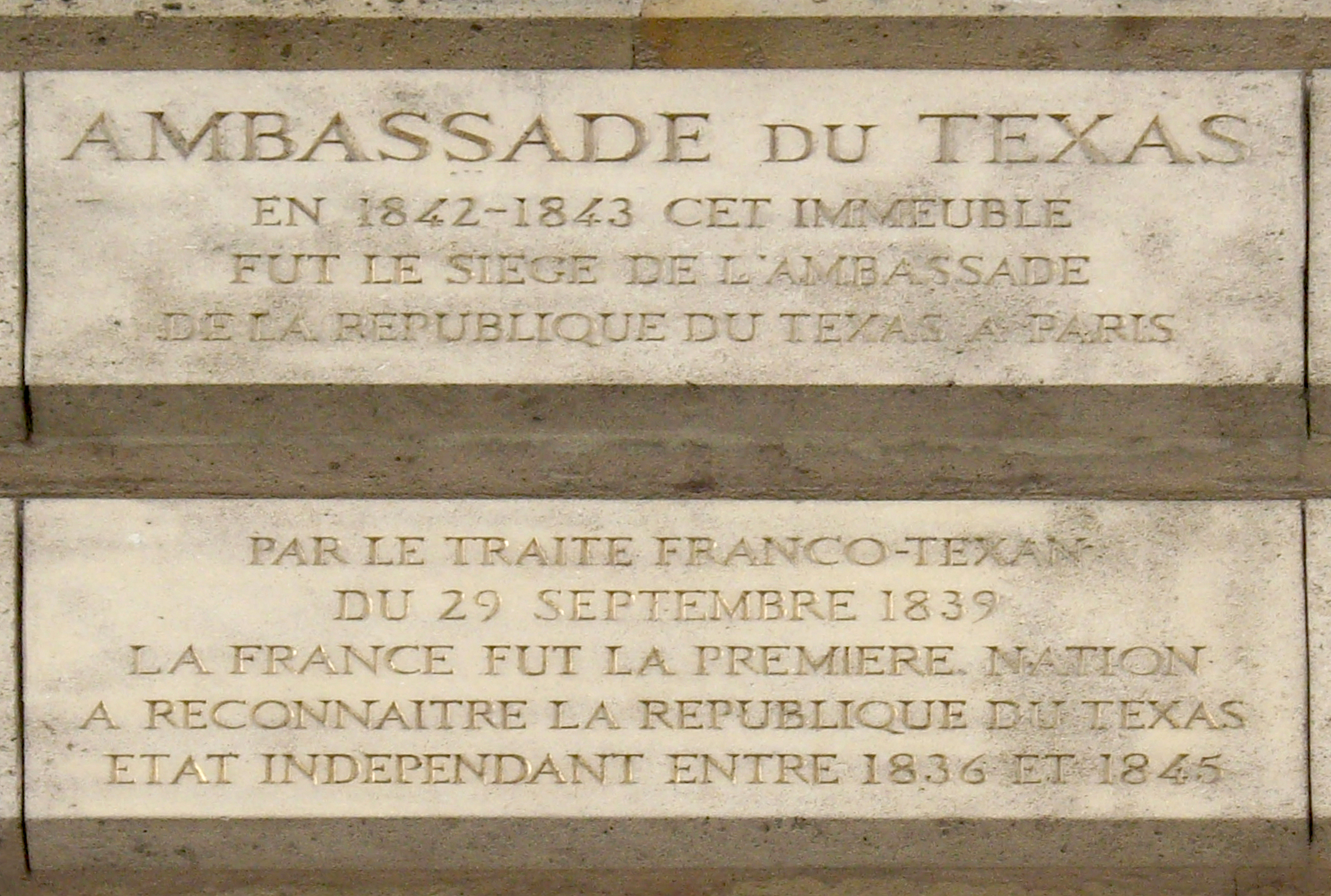
Commemorative plaque, 1 Place Vendôme, Paris 1st

A Texas Legation was maintained by the Republic of Texas in Washington, D.C.; London; and Paris (1 Place Vendôme) from 1836 through 1845.

In a bid to protect itself from almost certain invasion by forces from neighboring Mexico, the Texas government sought to foster international ties and so opened the Texas Legations in London and Paris.

When Texas sought to join the United States in 1845, the British Empire supported keeping it independent. The British even offered to guarantee Texas's borders with both the United States and Mexico. Texas was a tactical ally of Britain, which wanted a counterweight to the United States. Nonetheless, an independent Texas was probably inviable for financial reasons, and when the republic became a state in 1845, the legations were shut down.

== Locations ==
London 51.5056°N 0.1380°W

The Texas Legation in London was located in Pickering Place, an alley off the east side of St. James's Street near St. James's Palace in a building that also houses Berry Bros. & Rudd, a prestigious wine merchants' firm that has been at that site since 1698. On the north side of the building is a plaque marking it as the site of the legation. At the top of the plaque is the seal of the Republic of Texas. The text of the plaque reads: "Texas Legation in this building was the legation for the ministers from the Republic of Texas to the Court of St. James 1842–1845. Erected by the Anglo-Texan Society".

The plaque was erected in 1963. Anglo-Texan Society member Alfred Bossom led the effort to erect the plaque and the honour of its unveiling went to then-Governor Price Daniel.

Paris 48.8668°N 2.3288°E

The Texas Legation in Paris was located not far from the Tuileries Palace at 1 Place Vendôme 75001, where there is today a carving on the wall above the Hôtel Bataille de Francès that indicates where the legation used to be.

Washington, D.C.

The Texas Legation in Washington, D.C., moved frequently and occupied eight different locations during its short history. One of these locations, a Pennsylvania Avenue boarding house, sat on or near the grounds of the United States Navy Memorial. Another location is occupied by a building that has hosted the Washington office of the University of Texas System.
