= List of ambassadors of the United States to Texas =

List of United States diplomats to the Republic of Texas

Charges d'Affaires of the United States to Texas
- Seal of the United States Department of State
- Incumbent; Position abolished since August 9, 1845
- Nominator: The president of the United States
- Inaugural holder: Alcée Louis la Branche as Chargé d'Affaires
- Formation: March 7, 1837
- Final holder: Andrew Jackson Donelson as Chargé d'Affaires
- Abolished: August 9, 1845 (Annexation of Texas)

The United States recognized the Republic of Texas, created by a new constitution on March 2, 1836, as a new independent nation and commissioned its first representative, Alcee La Branche as the chargé d'affaires in 1837. The U.S. never sent a full minister (the term "ambassador" was not in use) to Texas, but a series of chargés represented the government in Austin until Texas joined the Union in 1845.

== Chargés d'Affaires ==
- Alcée Louis la Branche
  - Title: Chargé d'Affaires
  - Appointed: March 7, 1837
  - Presented credentials: October 23–27, 1837
  - Terminated mission: Left Texas soon after June 5, 1840
- George H. Flood
  - Title: Chargé d'Affaires
  - Appointed: March 16, 1840
  - Presented credentials: June 21–22, 1840
  - Terminated mission: Presented recall July 21, 1841
- Joseph Eve
  - Title: Chargé d'Affaires
  - Appointed: April 15, 1841
  - Presented credentials: July 21, 1841
  - Terminated mission: Relinquished charge June 3, 1843
- William Sumter Murphy
  - Title: Chargé d'Affaires
  - Appointed: April 10, 1843
  - Presented credentials: June 16, 1843
  - Terminated mission: Died at Galveston, Texas, July 13, 1844
- Tilghman A. Howard
  - Title: Chargé d'Affaires
  - Appointed: June 11, 1844
  - Presented credentials: August 2, 1844
  - Terminated mission: Died at Washington, Texas, August 16, 1844
- Andrew J. Donelson
  - Title: Chargé d'Affaires
  - Appointed: September 16, 1844
  - Presented credentials: November 29, 1844
  - Terminated mission: Left Texas on or soon after August 9, 1845
- Note: Texas was annexed to the United States effective December 29, 1845.

== Sources ==
- United States Department of State: Ambassadors to Texas

== See also ==
- History of Texas
- Ambassadors from the United States
