= List of people from Louisiana =

State flag of Louisiana

Location of Louisiana in the United States

The following are notable people who were either born, raised, or have lived for a significant period of time in the American state of Louisiana.

== A ==
- Mark Abraham (born 1953), state representative for Calcasieu Parish, effective 2016; incoming state senator, 2020; Lake Charles businessman
- Danneel Ackles (born 1979), actress, model, One Life to Live, One Tree Hill, Friends with Benefits, Supernatural
- Bert A. Adams (1916–2003), member of the Louisiana House of Representatives from Vernon Parish (1956–68)
- Bryan Adams (born 1963), member of the Louisiana House of Representatives from Jefferson Parish
- Jamar Adcock (1917–1991), politician and banker
- Joe Adcock (1927–1999), major league baseball player from Coushatta
- Trace Adkins (born 1962), singer-songwriter originally from Sarepta
- Joe W. Aguillard (born 1956), president of Louisiana College (2005–14)
- Kermit Alexander (born 1941), NFL player; president of NFL Players Association (1971–72)
- Robert Alford (born 1988), cornerback for the Atlanta Falcons
- David Allen (born 1945), productivity consultant, author of Getting Things Done
- August Alsina (born 1992), singer
- William Alston (1921–2009), philosopher
- Jacques Amans (1801–1888), neoclassical portrait artist
- Barry Jean Ancelet (born 1951), folklorist
- Andy Anders (born 1956), state representative from Concordia Parish
- David Andrews (born 1952), actor, JAG
- Phil Anselmo (born 1968), singer-songwriter, Pantera
- George Arceneaux (1928–1993), judge
- Scott Arceneaux Jr. (Born 1989), musician; member of rap duo Suicideboys
- Alphonse "Bois Sec" Ardoin (1915–2007), musician
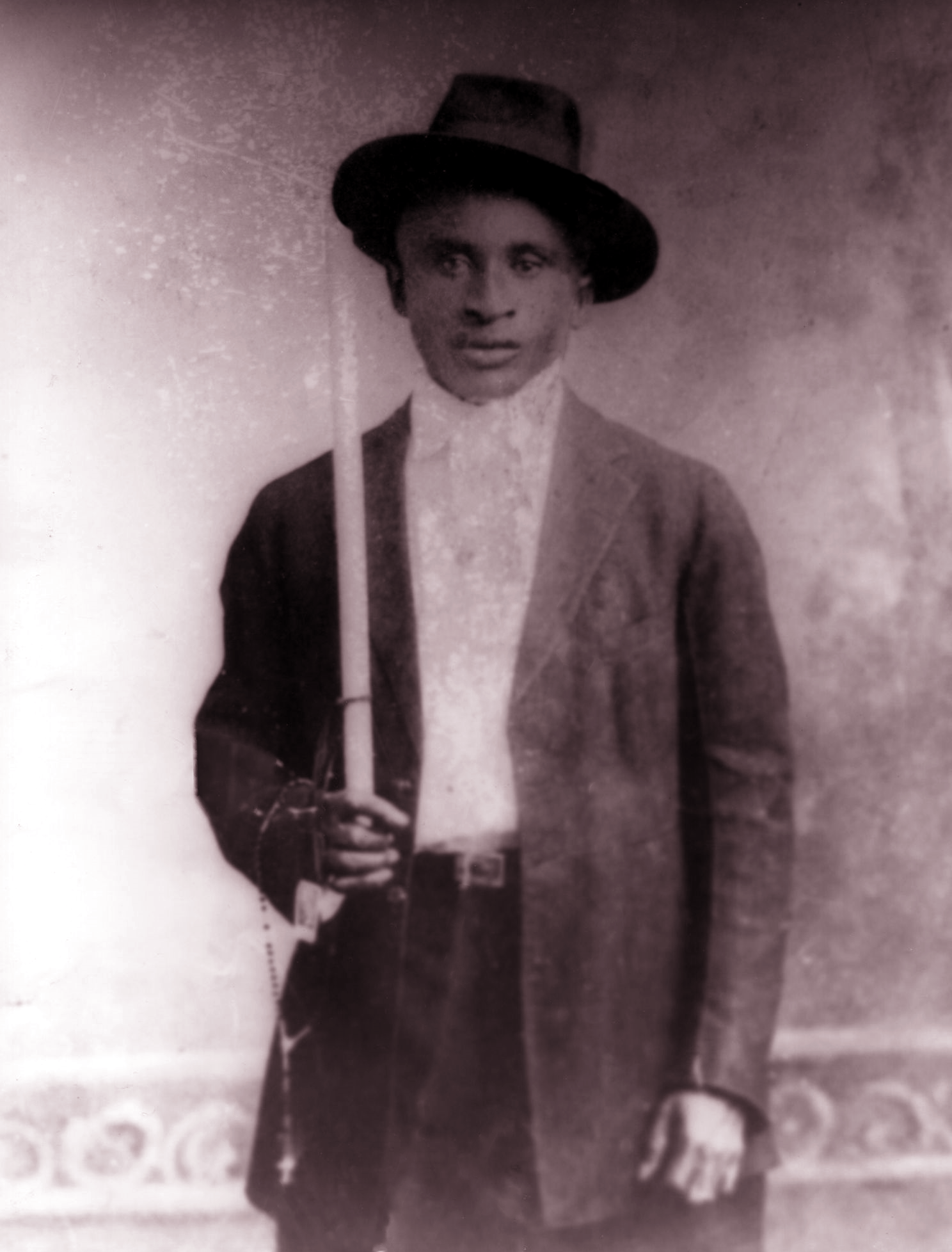
- Amédé Ardoin
  Amédé Ardoin (1898–1942), musician
- Chris Ardoin (born 1981), musician
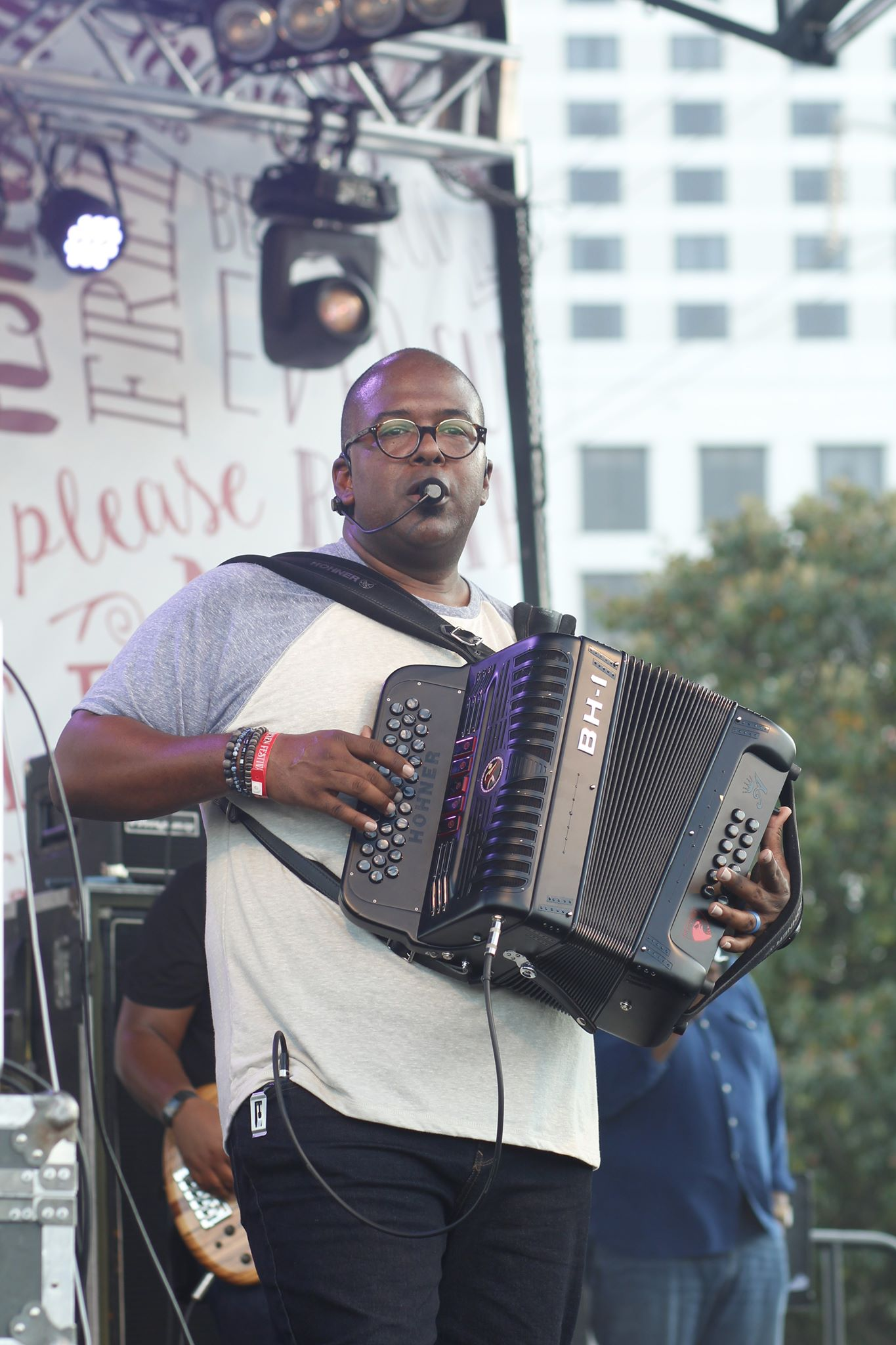
- Sean Ardoin
  Sean Ardoin (born 1969), musician
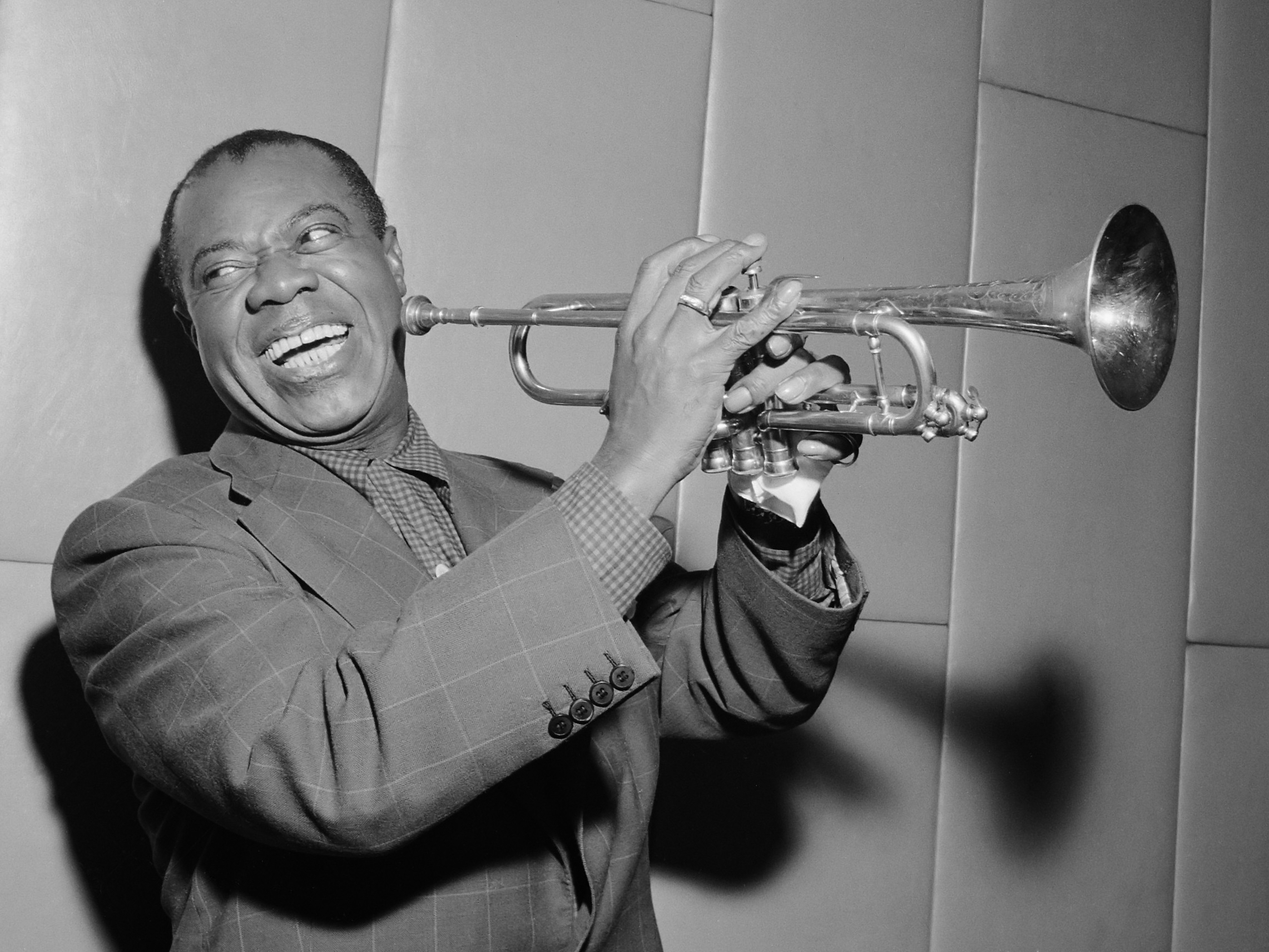
- Louis Armstrong
  Louis Armstrong (1901–1971), musician and entertainer
- Jeff Arnold (born 1967), politician
- Daniel F. Ashford (1879–1929), politician and planter
- Evelyn Ashford (born 1957), Olympic sprint champion
- Elizabeth Ashley (born 1939), actress, films and television's Evening Shade
- Nnamdi Asomugha (born 1981), cornerback for the Philadelphia Eagles
- James Benjamin Aswell (1869–1931), US representative and college president
- D. J. Augustin (born 1987), point guard for the Chicago Bulls
- Lisa Aukland (born 1957), professional bodybuilder and powerlifter
- Lonnie O. Aulds (1925–1984), politician
- Ray Authement (1928–2020), longest-serving public university president in the United States; president of the University of Louisiana at Lafayette (1974–2008)
- The Axeman (fl. 1918–1919), serial killer
- Clarence C. "Taddy" Aycock (1915–1987), speaker of the Louisiana House of Representatives (1952–56) and lieutenant governor (1960–72)

== B ==
- J. S. Bacon (1858–1939), former state representative from Webster Parish
- Boosie Badazz (born 1982), rapper
- Larry Bagley (born 1949), state representative for DeSoto Parish
- Amari Bailey (born 2004), NBA and Israeli Basketball Premier League basketball player
- Richard Baker (born 1948), former U.S. representative from Louisiana's 6th congressional district
- Scott Baker (born 1981), starting pitcher for the Minnesota Twins
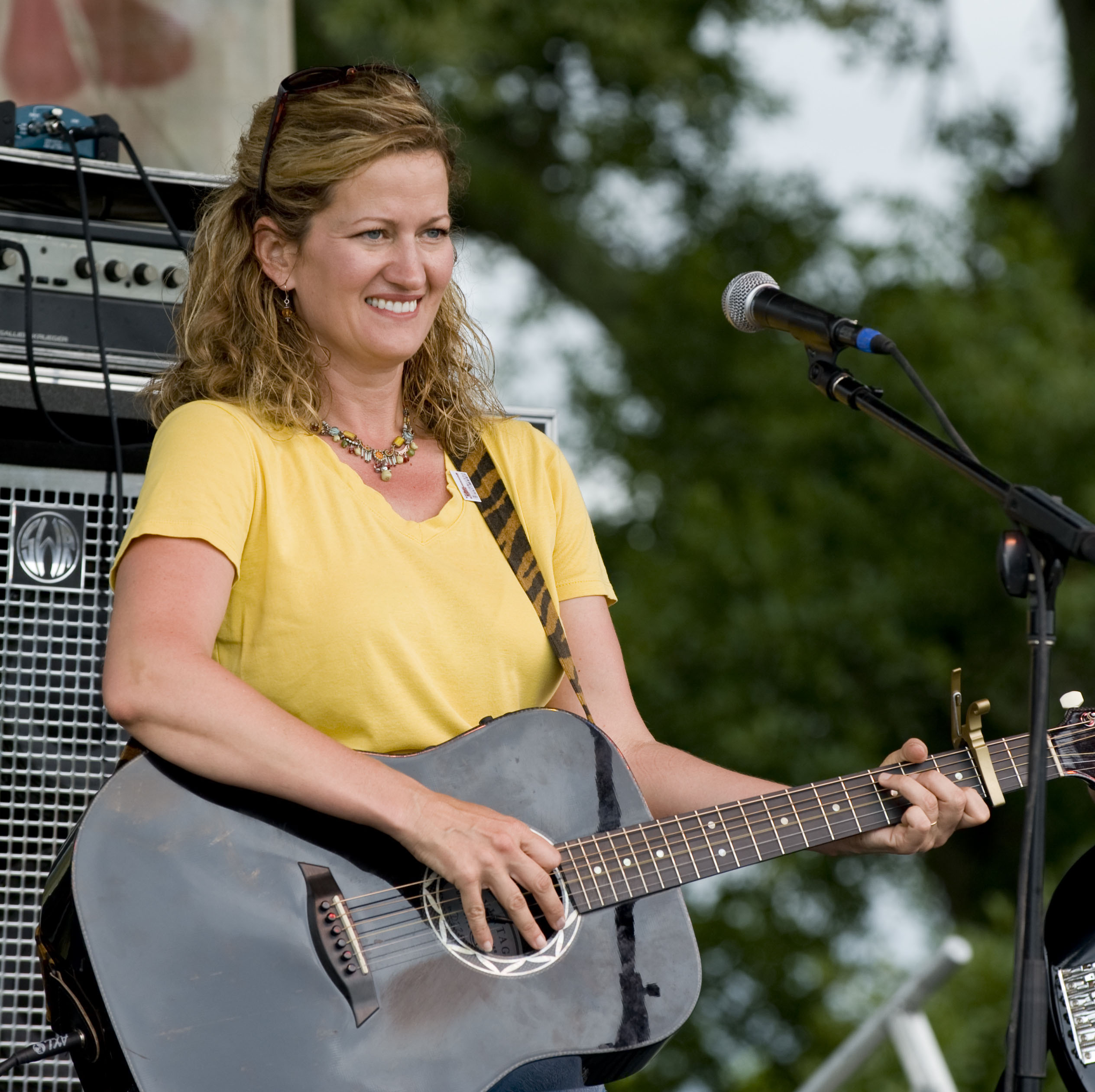
- Christine Balfa
  Christine Balfa (born 1968), musician
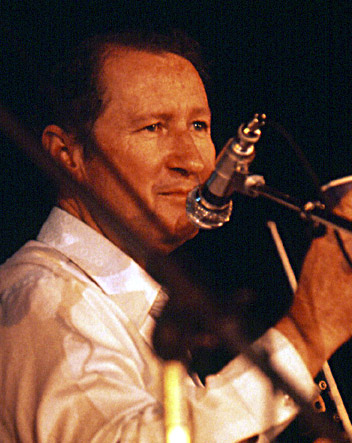
- Dewey Balfa
  Dewey Balfa (1927–1992), fiddler
- George Ballas (1925–2011), inventor of the string trimmer
- Fredo Bang (born 1996), rapper
- Larry S. Bankston (born 1951), politician; son of Jesse Bankston
- Edwards Barham (1937–2014), first Republican elected to Louisiana state senate since Reconstruction (1976–80)
- Mack Barham (1924–2006), judge of the Louisiana Supreme Court
- Danny Barker (1909–1994), singer-songwriter, musician, writer
- Taylor Barras (born 1957), Speaker of the Louisiana House of Representatives, effective January 11, 2016
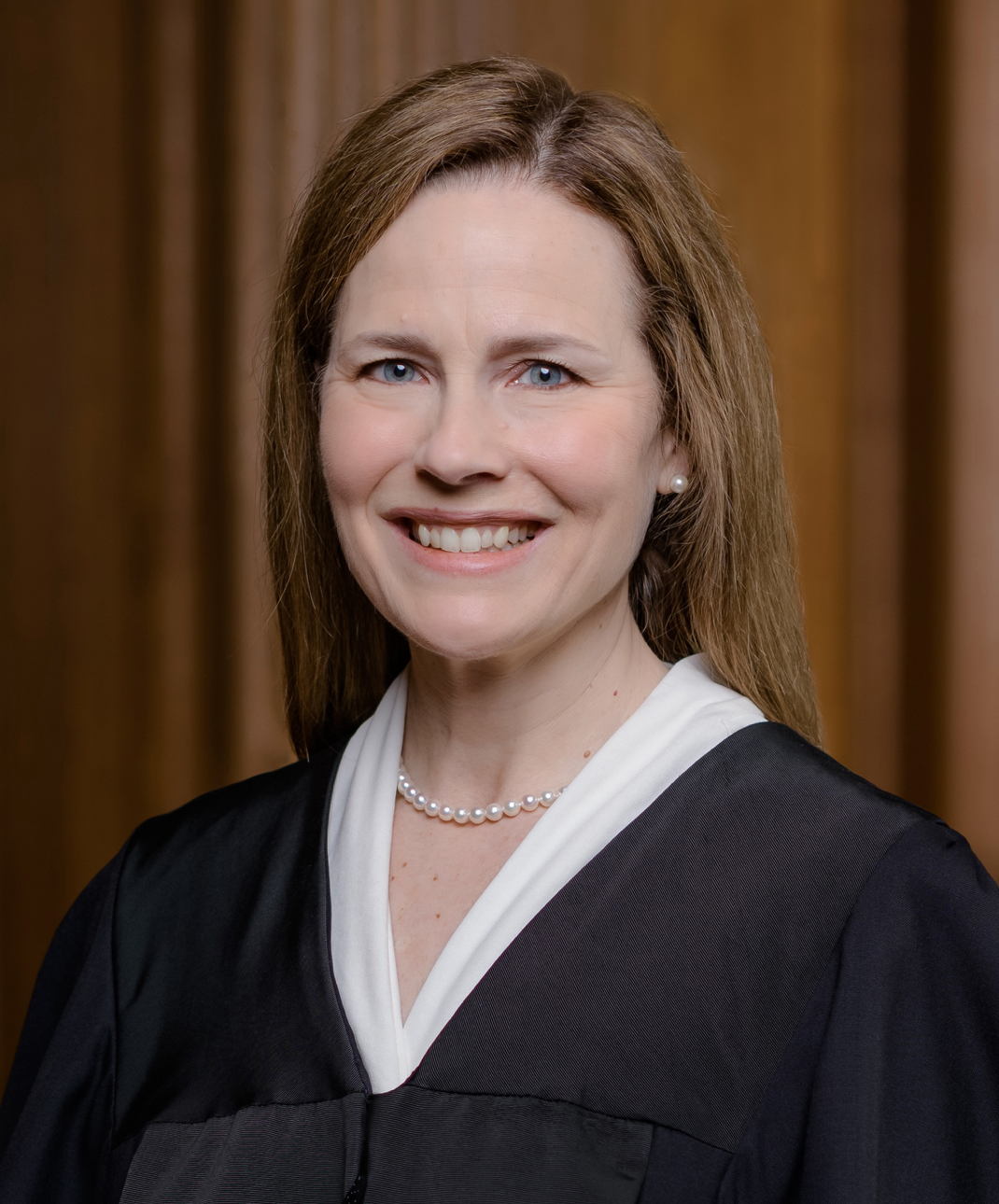
- Amy Coney Barrett
  Amy Coney Barrett (born 1972), associate justice of the Supreme Court
- Regina Barrow (born 1966), state representative for East and West Baton Rouge parishes (since 2005)
- Dave Bartholomew (1918–2019), musician, composer, promoter
- Brandon Bass (born 1985), power forward for the Boston Celtics
- Bryan Batt (born 1963), actor, Sal Romano on Mad Men
- Arnaz Battle (born 1980), wide receiver for the Pittsburgh Steelers
- J. D. Batton (1911–1981), sheriff of Webster Parish (1952–64)
- Carl W. Bauer (1933–2013), politician
- Ralph Norman Bauer (1899–1963), politician
- Hazel Beard (born 1930), mayor of Shreveport (1990–94)
- P. G. T. Beauregard (1818–1893), general, inventor
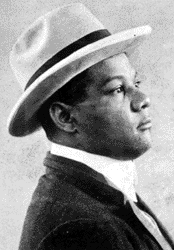
- Sidney Bechet
  Sidney Bechet (1897–1959), musician
- Odell Beckham Jr. (born 1992), wide receiver for the New York Giants
- Lottie Beebe (born 1953), politician and educator
- Geoffrey Beene (1927–2004), fashion designer
- Clyde F. Bel Jr. (c. 1932–2014), businessman and stare representative for Orleans Parish
- Demetress Bell (born 1984), offensive tackle for the Philadelphia Eagles
- V. J. Bella (born 1927), state legislator and fire marshal
- E. J. Bellocq (1873–1949), photographer
- Judah P. Benjamin (1811–1884), U.S. senator, Confederate cabinet member, lawyer in Great Britain
- Michael Bennett (born 1985), defensive end for the Seattle Seahawks
- Sherman A. Bernard (1925–2012), politician
- Louis Berry (1914–1998), civil rights attorney from Alexandria
- Johnny Berthelot (born 1951), politician
- B.G. (born 1980), rapper, musician
- Joseph A. Biedenharn (1866–1952), entrepreneur, first to bottle Coca-Cola; settled in Monroe in 1913
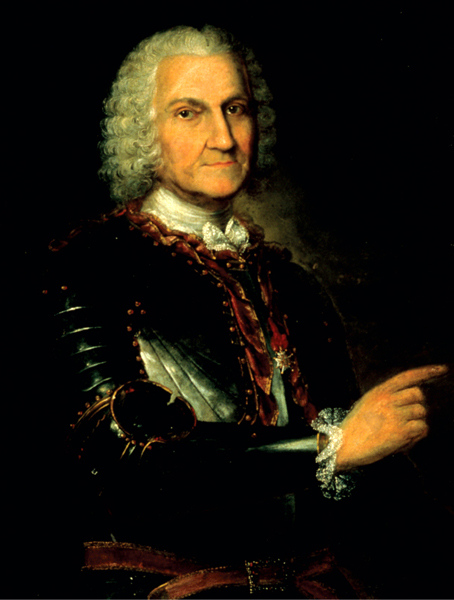
- Jean-Baptiste Le Moyne de Bienville
  Bienville (Jean-Baptiste Le Moyne) (1680–1767), French colonial governor, founder of New Orleans
- Robert Billiot (born 1953), state representative for Jefferson Parish (since 2008)
- Birdman (born 1969), rapper and record executive
- Stuart Bishop (born 1975), member of the Louisiana House of Representatives for Lafayette
- Morton Blackwell (born 1939), Louisiana Republican political activist, since relocated to Virginia
- Brian Blade (born 1970), award-winning, Grammy-nominated, jazz musician, bandleader, conductor
- Newton C. Blanchard (1849–1922), governor of Louisiana (1904–08); U.S. senator (1894–97)
- Terrence Blanchard (born 1962), musician, composer
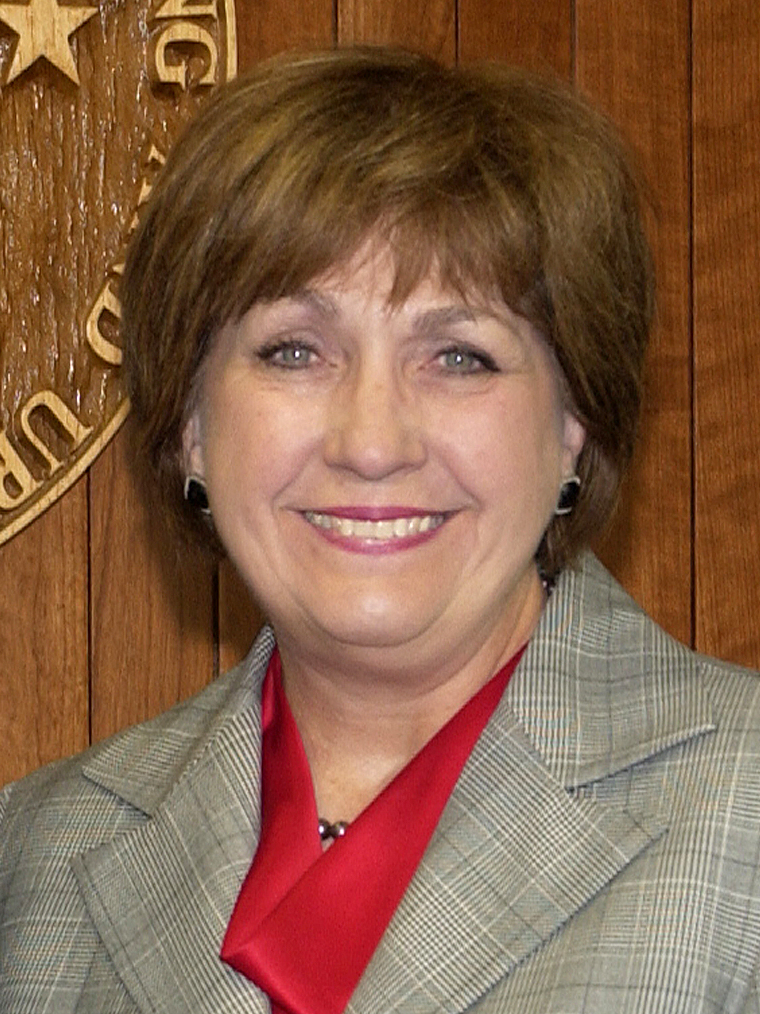
- Governor Kathleen Blanco
  Kathleen Blanco (1942–2019), governor of Louisiana (2004–08)
- Alexander Boarman (1839–1916), politician
- Walter Boasso (born 1960), politician, businessman
- Hale Boggs (1914–1972), U.S. representative for Louisiana's 2nd congressional district
- Lindy Boggs (1916–2013), wife of Hale Boggs and his successor in Congress, ambassador to the Vatican
- Thomas Hale Boggs Jr. (1940–2014), lawyer and lobbyist, son of Hale and Lindy Boggs
- William Benton Boggs (1854–1922), first mayor of Plain Dealing (1890); state senator for Bossier and Webster parishes (1908–16)
- Brandon Bolden (born 1990), running back for the New England Patriots
- Buddy Bolden (1877–1930), musician, potential "inventor of jazz"
- Skip Bolen (fl. 1980s–2010s), photographer
- James E. Bolin (1914–2002), former state representative; former district court judge; retired appeal court judge
- George Washington Bolton (1841–1931), state representative and Speaker of the Louisiana House from Alexandria
- George W. Bond (1891–1974), president of Louisiana Tech University (1928–36)
- James Booker (1939–1983), musician
- Curtis Boozman (1898–1979), state representative from Natchitoches Parish
- Guy Bordelon (1922–2002), Navy flying ace during the Korean War
- Ken Bordelon (born 1953), former New Orleans Saints linebacker
- Calvin Borel (born 1966), jockey, winner of 2007, 2009 and 2010 Kentucky Derby
- Pierre Bossier (1797–1844), first U.S. representative from Louisiana's 4th congressional district (1843–44)
- Savannah Smith Boucher (born 1943), actress
- Sherry Boucher (born 1945), actress
- MacKenzie Bourg (born 1992), singer-songwriter and contestant on American Idol season 15
- Charles Boustany (born 1956), US representative
- Denise Boutte (born 1982), model, actress, Meet the Browns
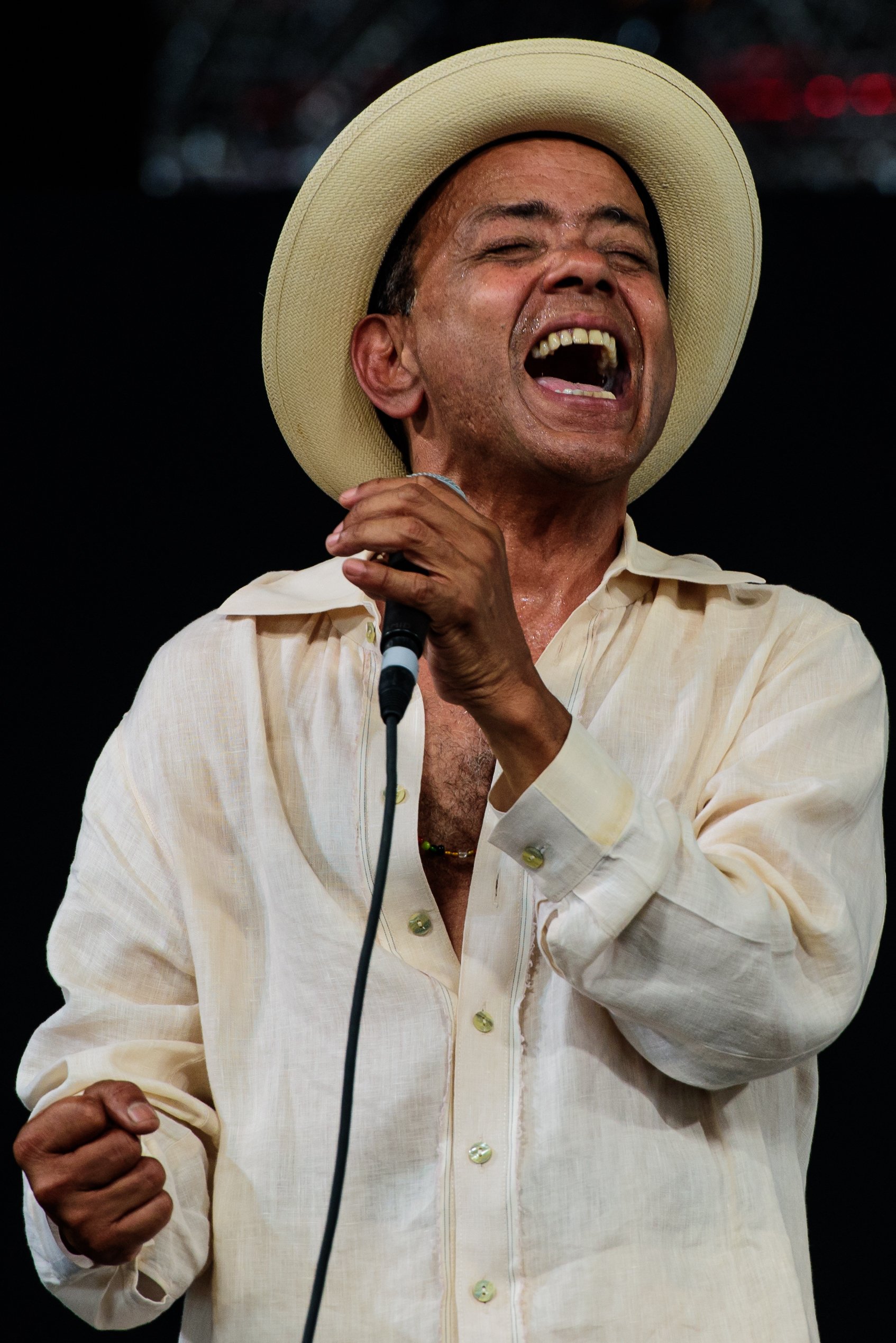
- John Boutté
  John Boutté (born 1958), jazz singer
- Shirley D. Bowler (born 1949), state representative
- Jimmy Boyd (fl. 1940s–1950s), state representative for Bossier Parish 1944–1952
- Betsy Vogel Boze (born 1953), university president at Kent State University Stark Campus
- Harley Bozeman (1891–1971), politician, journalist, and historian
- Henry Braden (1944–2013), African-American politician
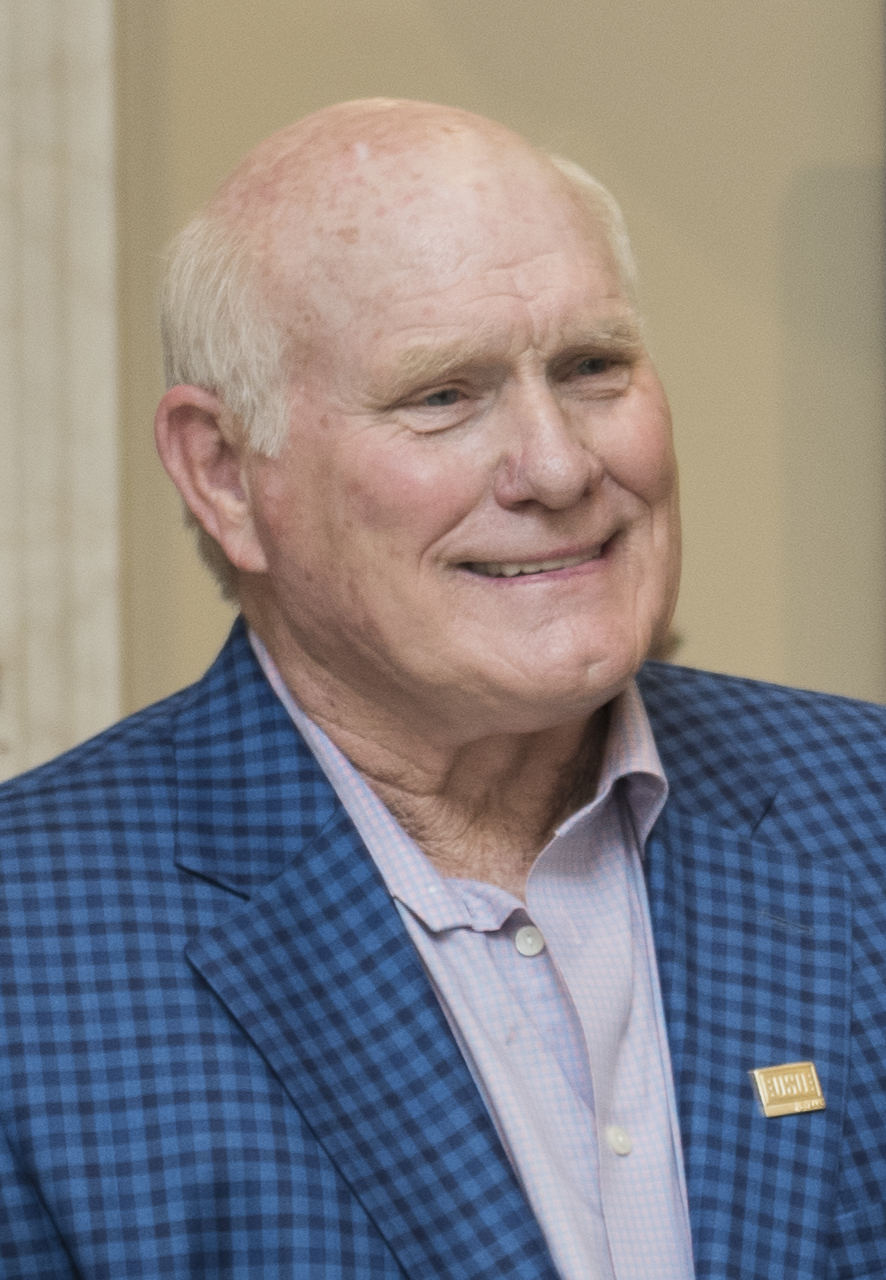
- Terry Bradshaw
  Terry Bradshaw (born 1948), Super Bowl champion Pittsburgh Steelers quarterback, Fox television commentator
- Elward Thomas Brady Jr. (c. 1926–2007), politician
- Thomas "Bud" Brady (1938–2011), politician
- Mike Branch (born 1968), politician and commercial pilot
- Tim Brando (born 1956), CBS Sports announcer
- Carl A. Brasseaux (born 1951), historian and educator
- Ryan Brasseaux (born 1976), musicologist
- Wellman Braud (1891–1966), musician
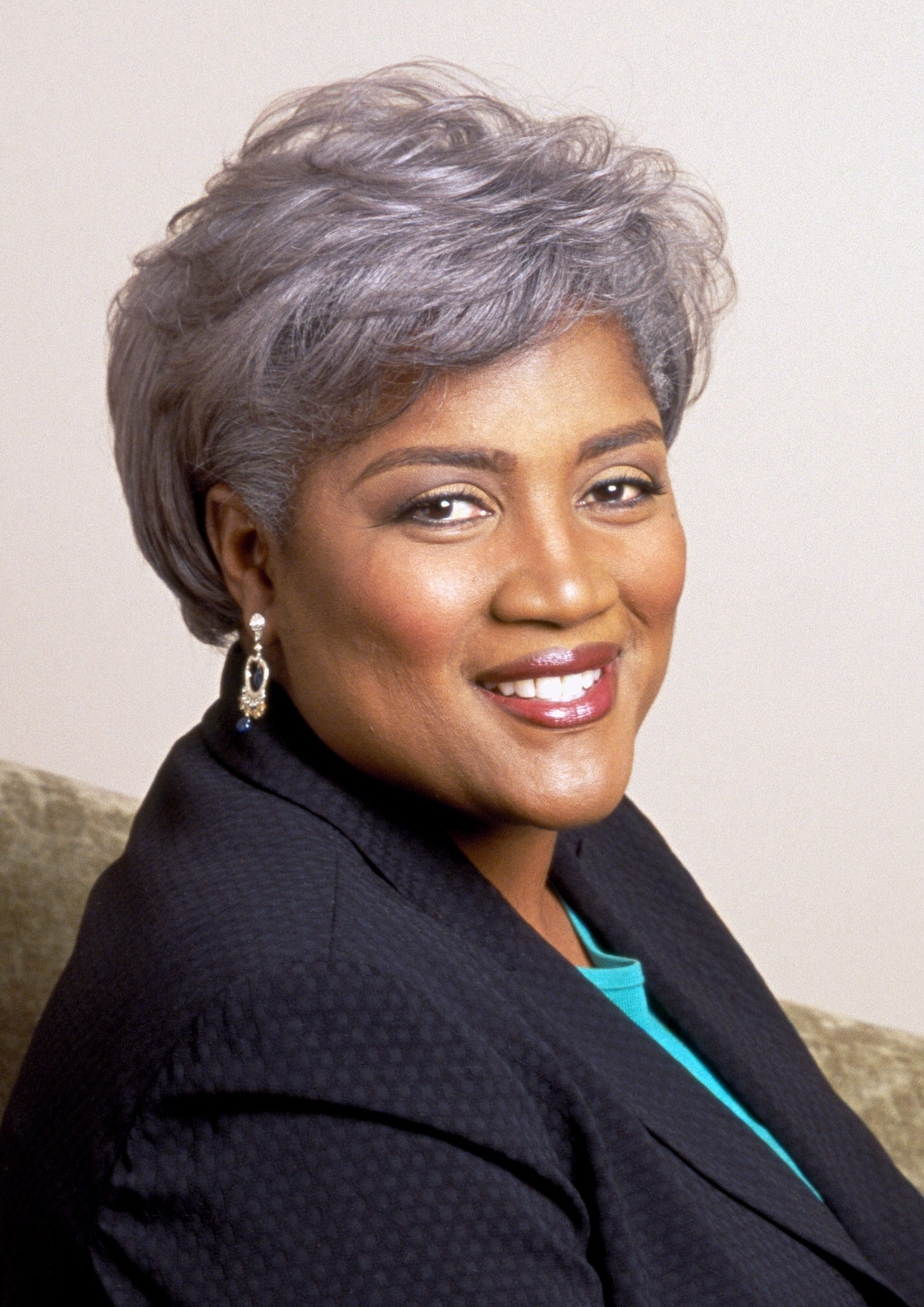
- Donna Brazile
  Donna Brazile (born 1959), author, professor, political analyst for the Democratic Party
- Delvin Breaux (born 1989), cornerback for the New Orleans Saints
- John Breaux (born 1944), U.S. senator
- Marc Breaux (1924–2013), director
- Sara "D-D" Breaux (born 1953), former gymnastics coach
- Tim Breaux (born 1970), former professional basketball player
- Phanor Breazeale (1858–1934), U.S. representative
- Owen Brennan (1910–1954), restaurateur, Brennan's in New Orleans
- Rick Brewer (born 1956), president of Louisiana College in Pineville since 2015
- Bri (born 1994), musician
- Reid Brignac (born 1986), shortstop for the Tampa Bay Rays
- Pat Brister (1946–2020), Republican politician
- Poppy Z. Brite (born 1967), writer
- Chris Broadwater (born 1972), politician
- Clifford Cleveland Brooks (1886–1944), politician
- Lawrence Brooks (1909–2022), supercentenarian, World War II U.S. Army veteran
- Overton Brooks (1897–1961), U.S. representative, 1937–1961
- Jared Brossett (born 1982), New Orleans politician
- Edwin S. Broussard (1870–1934), U.S. senator, 1921–1933
- Jeffery Broussard (born 1967), zydeco musician
- Marc Broussard (born 1982), singer-songwriter
- Robert F. Broussard (fl. 1890s–1910s), U.S. representative for Louisiana's 3rd congressional district 1897–1915 and U.S. senator 1915–1918
- Campbell Brown (born 1968), journalist
- Chad M. Brown (born 1970), state representative for Iberville and Assumption parishes, effective January 2016
- Dee Brown (1908–2002), novelist, historian, author of Bury My Heart at Wounded Knee
- Kalani Brown (born 1997), player in the Israeli Female Basketball Premier League
- Markel Brown (born 1992), basketball player in the Israeli Basketball Premier League
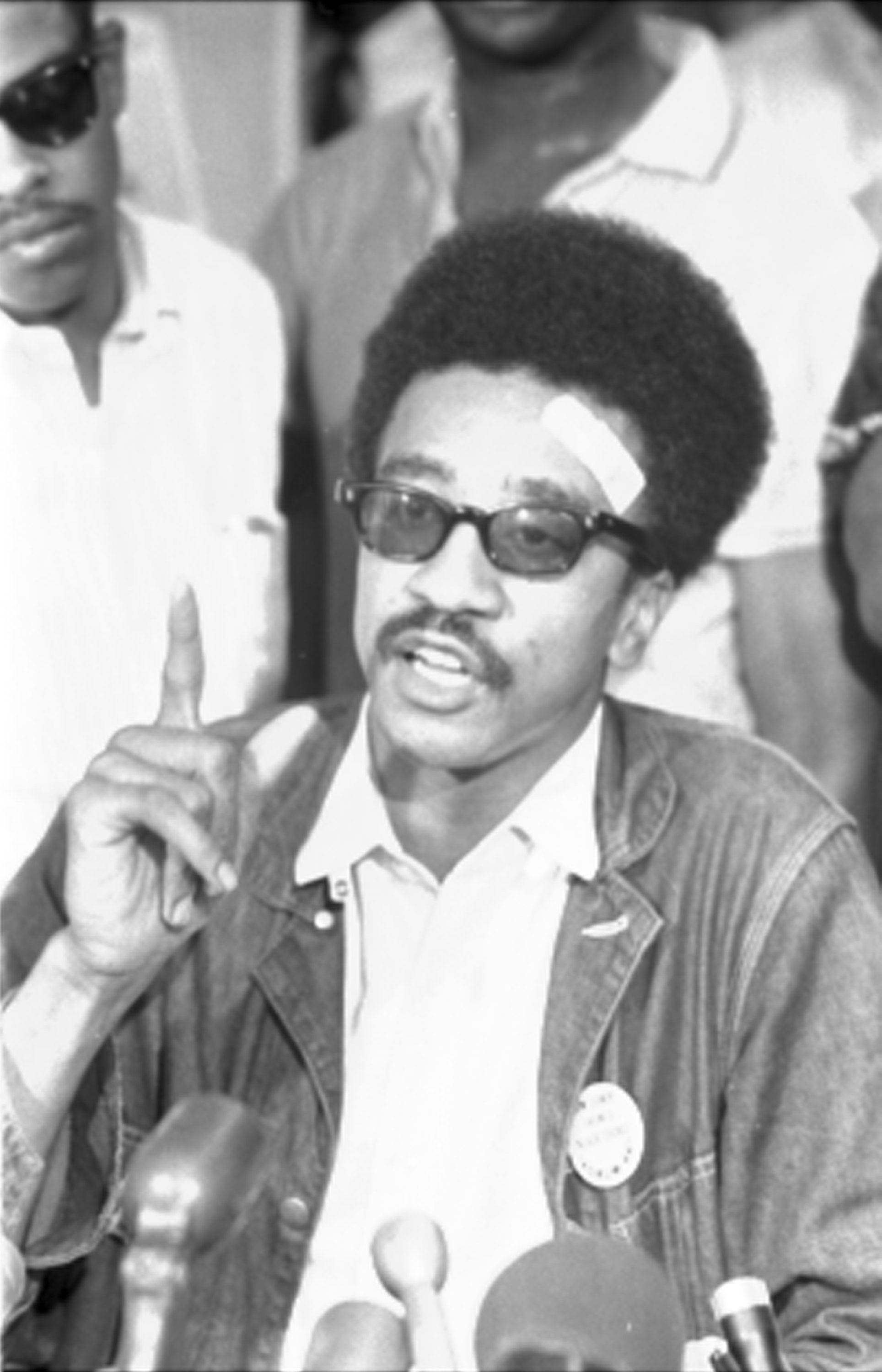
- H. Rap Brown
  H. Rap Brown (1943–2025), black activist imprisoned in Georgia
- Henry Newton Brown Jr. (born 1941), state appeals court chief judge
- J. Marshall Brown (1924–1995), politician
- Sharon Brown (fl. 1960s), 1961 Miss USA
- Terry R. Brown (fl. 2010s–2020s), state representative from Grant Parish since 2012
- Tom Brown (1888–1958), musician
- Troy E. Brown (born 1971), former member of the Louisiana State Senate from Assumption Parish
- Roy Brun (born 1953), state representative and judge from Caddo Parish
- Stanley Brundy (born 1967), basketball player
- George Brunies (1902–1974), musician
- C.L. Bryant (born 1956), African-American Baptist minister and conservative talk show host over KEEL radio in Shreveport
- Sherri Smith Buffington (born 1966), politician
- George E. Burch (1910–1986), cardiologist and Tulane Medical School professor
- James Lee Burke (born 1936), crime novelist, born in Texas, raised in Louisiana
- Paul Burke (1926–2009), actor: Naked City, Twelve O'Clock High, The Thomas Crown Affair
- James Burton (born 1939), guitarist

== C ==
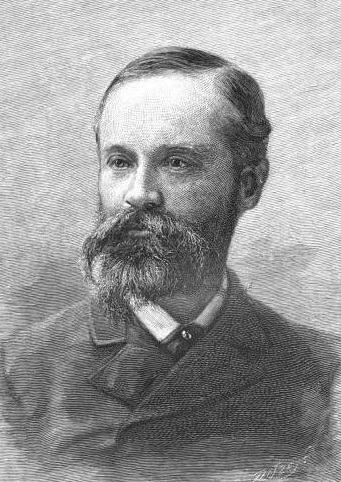
- George Washington Cable
  George Washington Cable (1844–1925), writer
- Jefferson Caffery (1886–1974), US ambassador; cousin of Patrick T. Caffery and Donelson Caffery
- Patrick T. Caffery (1932–2013), US representative; cousin of Jefferson Caffery and grandson of Donelson Caffery
- Donelson Caffery (1835–1906), US senator; grandfather of Patrick T. Caffery
- Chris Cagle (born 1968), country music artist
- Burl Cain (born 1942), warden of the Louisiana State Penitentiary (since 1995)
- Etienne J. Caire (1868–1955), Republican candidate for governor of Louisiana in 1928 against Huey P. Long
- George A. Caldwell (1892–1966), building contractor; designed twenty-six public buildings in Louisiana
- Riemer Calhoun (1909–1994), state senator from DeSoto and Caddo parishes (1944–52)
- Bill Callegari (born 1941), member of the Texas House of Representatives from Harris County; native of Avoyelles Parish
- Jorrick Calvin (born 1987), cornerback for the Philadelphia Eagles
- Foster Campbell (born 1947), politician
- Michelangelo Canale (born 1967) dancer and Ballet teacher
- William Derwood Cann Jr. (1919–2010), World War II lieutenant colonel; mayor of Monroe (1978–79)
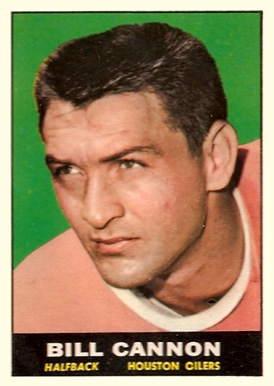
- Billy Cannon
  Billy Cannon (1937–2018), football player for LSU, Heisman Trophy winner
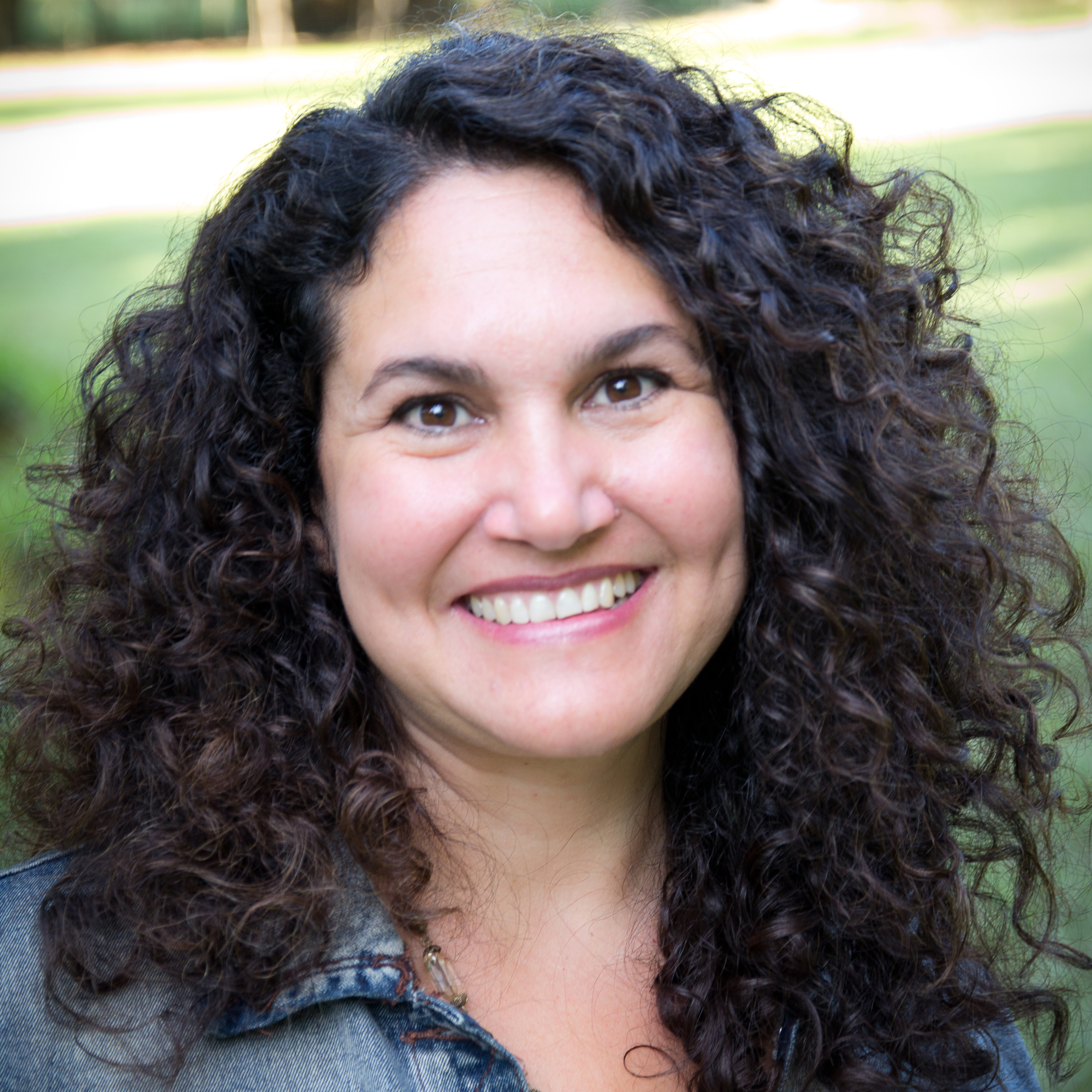
- Julie Cantrell
  Julie Cantrell (born 1973), author
- Joseph Cao (born 1968), former U.S. representative; lawyer
- Truman Capote (1924–1984), writer, author of In Cold Blood and Breakfast at Tiffany's
- Lindsey Cardinale (born 1985), American Idol finalist, country singer
- Kitty Carlisle (1910–2007), entertainer and television personality; married to playwright Moss Hart
- Thomas G. Carmody (born 1961), state representative
- Edward M. Carmouche (1921–1990), politician
- Liz Carmouche (born 1984), mixed martial arts fighter
- Paul Carr (1934–2006), actor
- Joseph "Bébé" Carrière (1908–2001), la la and Cajun musician
- Lane Carson (born 1947), first Vietnam War veteran to serve in Louisiana House of Representatives
- Gary Carter Jr. (born 1974), member of the Louisiana House of Representatives from the Algiers neighborhood in New Orleans, effective 2016
- Robby Carter (born 1960), member of the Louisiana House of Representatives for East Feliciana, St. Helena, and Tangipahoa parishes, 1996–2008 and since 2016
- James Carville (born 1944), political consultant and television commentator
- Tommy Casanova (born 1950), football player, ophthalmologist, politician
- Bill Cassidy (born 1957), U.S. representative, physician
- Don Cazayoux (born 1964), politician
- Oliver Celestin (born 1981), football safety player
- Leonard J. Chabert (c. 1932–1991), politician
- Marty J. Chabert (born c. 1956), politician
- Norby Chabert (born 1976), politician
- Tina Chandler (born 1974), IFBB professional bodybuilder
- Pokey Chatman (born 1969), basketball player, WNBA head coach
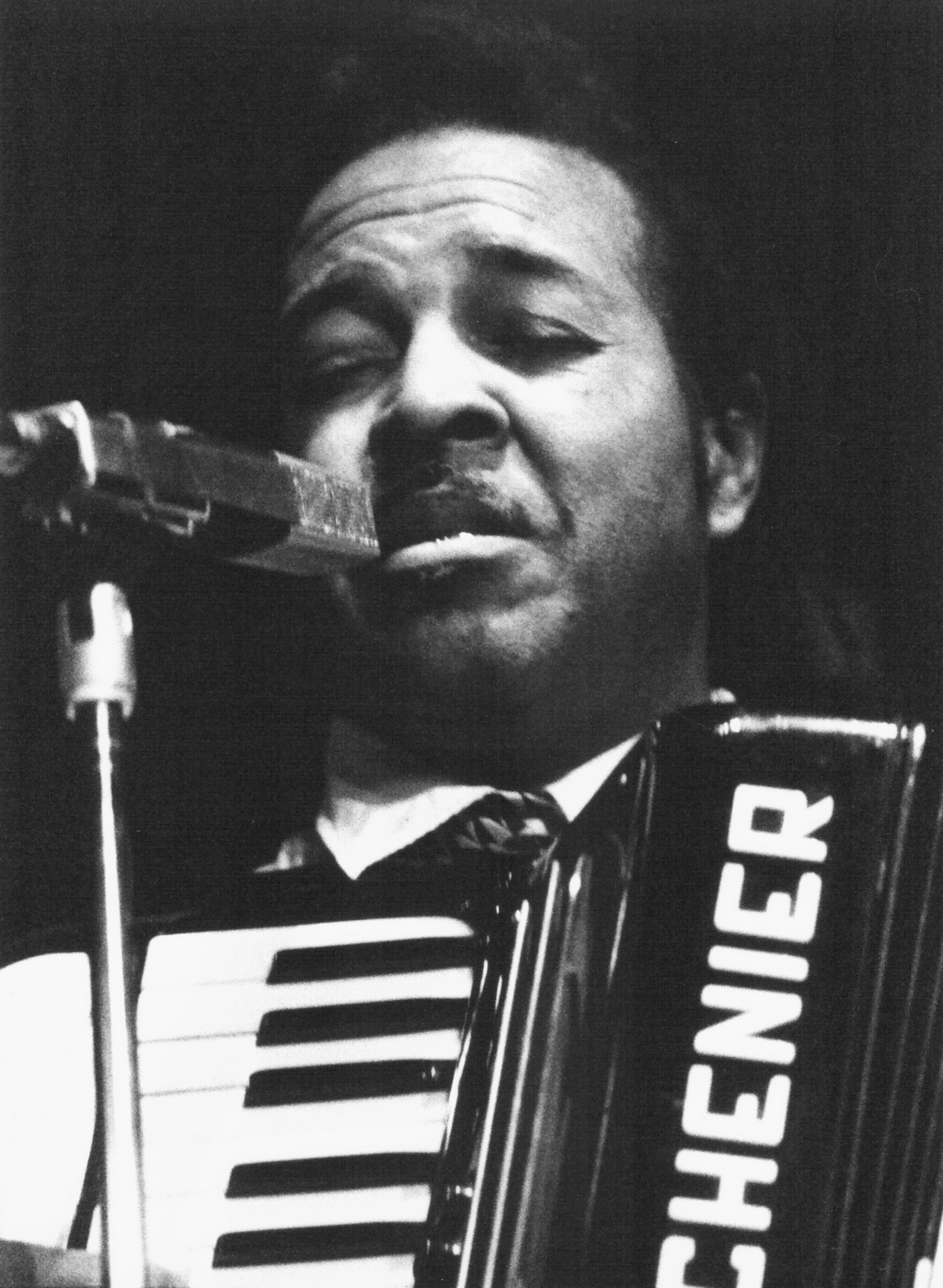
- Clifton Chenier
  Clifton Chenier (1925–1987), Zydeco musician
- Claire Chennault (1893–1958), aviator, general
- Jimmy Childress (1932–2015), state and national championship high school football coach
- Jay Chevalier (1936–2019), singer
- Monnie T. Cheves (1902–1988), educator and state legislator
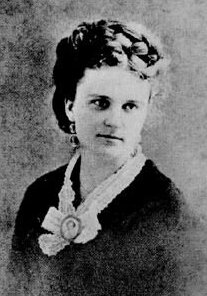
- Kate Chopin
  Kate Chopin (1851–1904), author
- Philip Ciaccio (1927–2015), state representative, New Orleans City Council member, state circuit judge 1982–1998
- Ben Claassen III (born 1978), illustrator and comics artist, DIRTFARM
- Morris Claiborne (born 1990), cornerback for the Dallas Cowboys
- William C. C. Claiborne (1775–1817), first US governor of Louisiana
- Ryan Clark (born 1979), safety for the Pittsburgh Steelers
- Clem S. Clarke (1897–1967), oilman and politician from Shreveport
- Patricia Clarkson (born 1959), Emmy Award-winning and Academy Award-nominated actress
- Sally Clausen (born 1945), university president and commissioner of higher education
- Thomas G. Clausen (1939–2002), last elected Louisiana state superintendent of education
- Michael Clayton (born 1982), wide receiver for the Tampa Bay Buccaneers
- A.C. "Ace" Clemons Jr. (1921–1992), first Republican state senator since Reconstruction; switched parties in 1970
- Bill Cleveland (1902–1974), Crowley real estate developer and member of both houses of Louisiana state legislature (1944–64); defeated for third term in state Senate in 1964 by Edwin Edwards
- Van Cliburn (1934–2013), classical pianist
- George Henry Clinton, politician
- Carl B. Close (1907–1980), politician
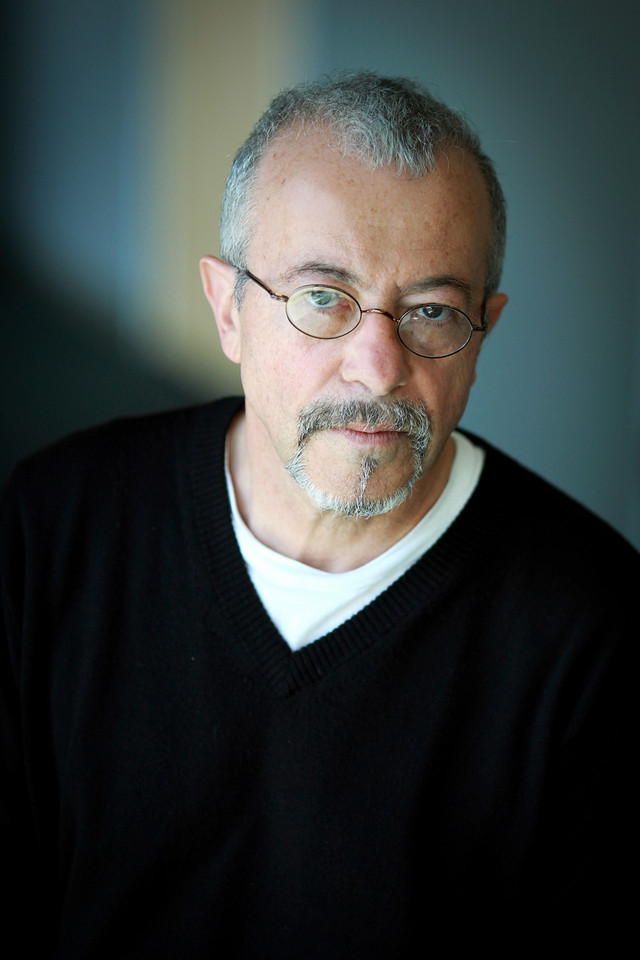
- Andrei Codrescu
  Andrei Codrescu (born 1946), author
- James E. Cofer (born 1949), president of University of Louisiana at Monroe, 2002–2010
- J. Frank Colbert (1882–1949), politician
- Luther F. Cole (1925–2013), state representative and associate justice of the Louisiana Supreme Court
- Hamilton D. Coleman (1845–1926), U.S. representative from Louisiana's 2nd congressional district (1889–1991)
- Vincent Coleman (1901–1971), actor
- La'el Collins (born 1993), offensive tackle for the Dallas Cowboys
- Landon Collins (born 1994), safety for the New York Giants
- Tazzie Colomb (born 1966), IFBB professional female bodybuilder and powerlifter
- Marshall Colt (born 1948), actor
- Amie Comeaux (1976–1997), country singer
- Ward Connerly (born 1939), political activist, businessman, and former University of California Regent
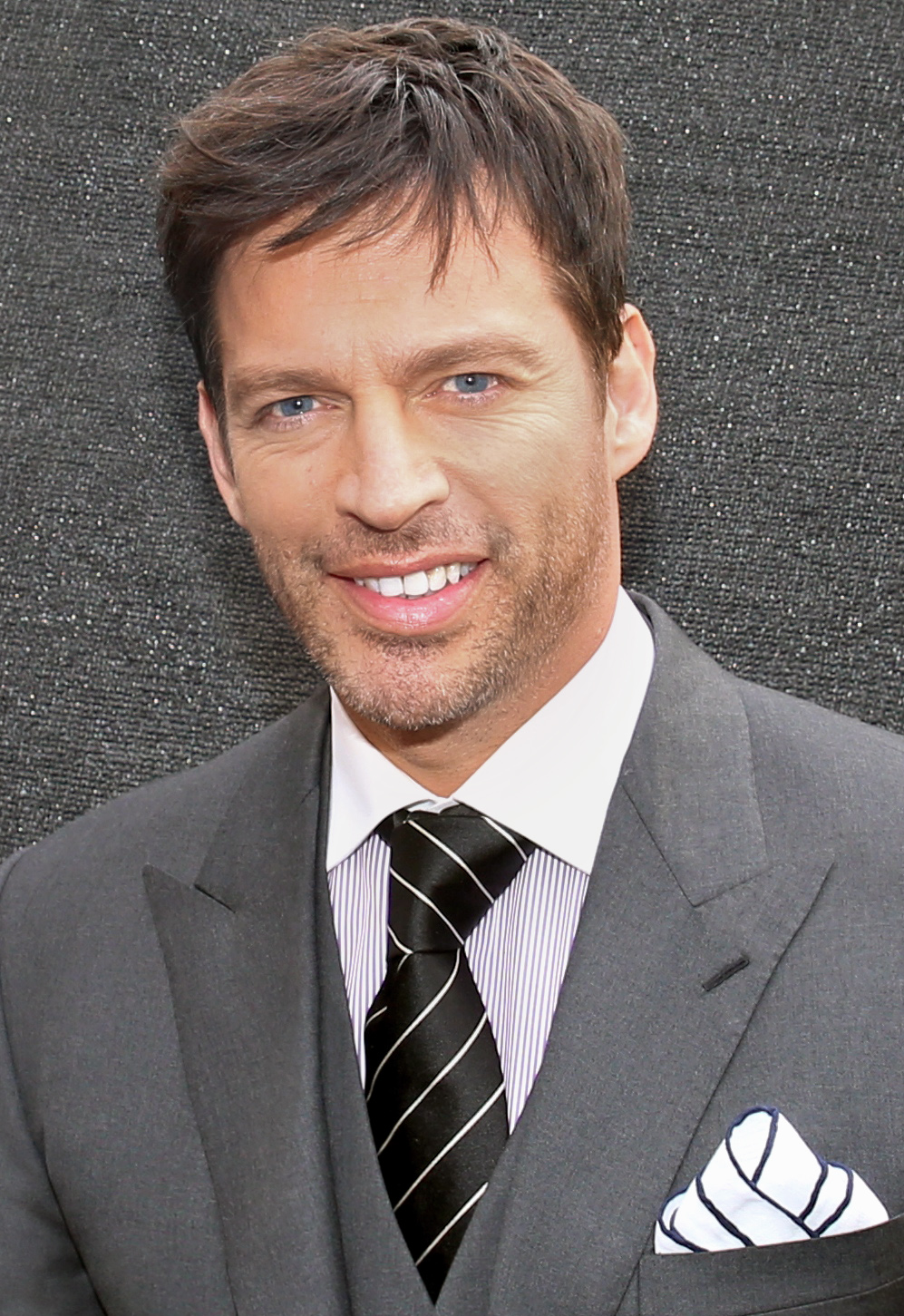
- Harry Connick Jr.
  Harry Connick Jr. (born 1967), musician, entertainer, actor
- Harry Connick Sr. (1926–2024), district attorney, singer
- Patrick Connick (born 1961), politician
- John R. Conniff (1874–1957), educator
- Charlie Cook (born 1953), political analyst
- John Cooksey (born 1941), US representative
- Donnie Copeland (born 1961), Republican member of the Arkansas House of Representatives; Pentecostal pastor in North Little Rock, native of Monroe, Louisiana
- Charles C. Cordill (1845–1916), politician
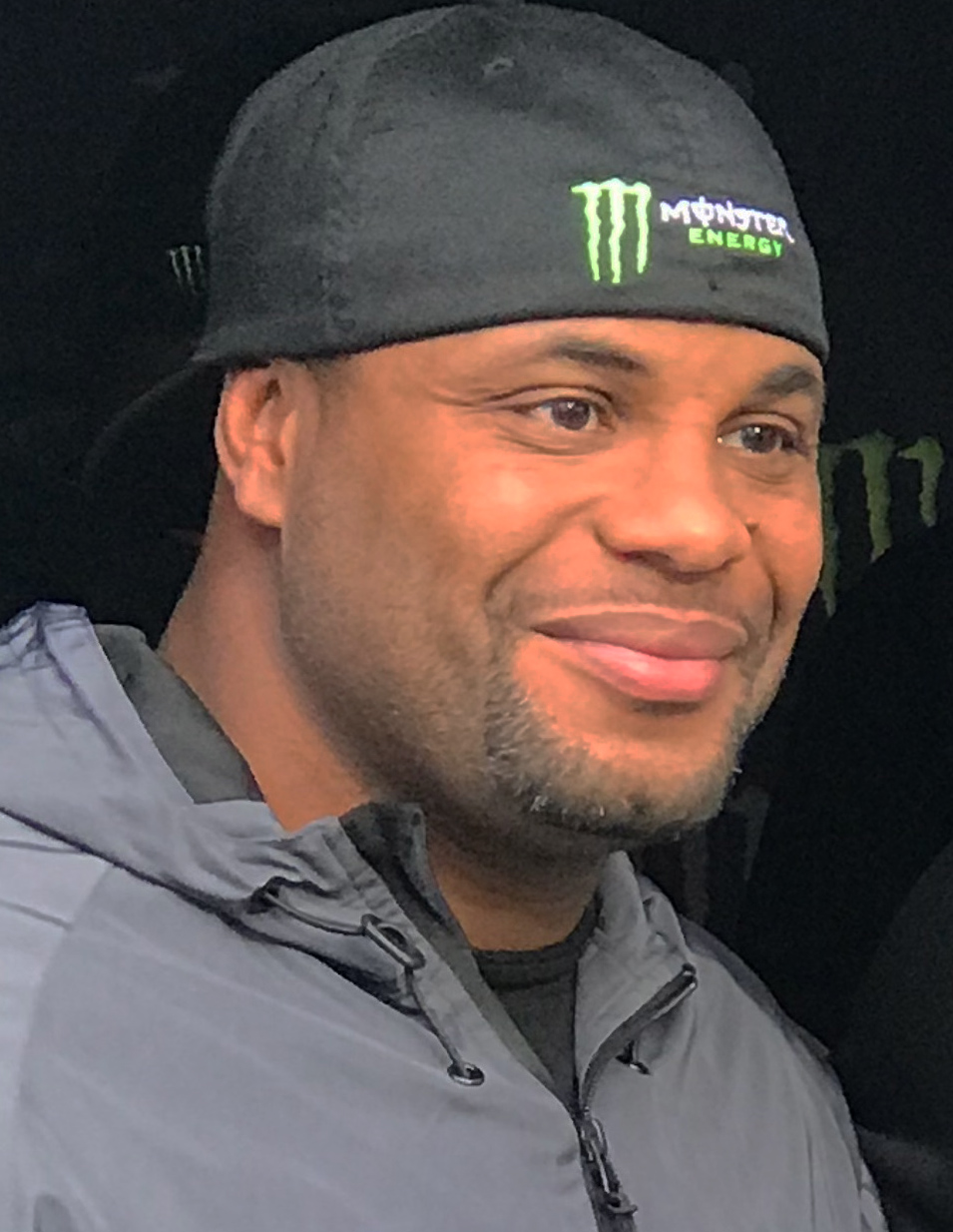
- Daniel Cormier
  Daniel Cormier (born 1979), UFC fighter and Olympic freestyle wrestler
- Lance Cormier (born 1980), relief pitcher for the Tampa Bay Rays
- Jeff Cox (born 1962), judge
- Robert Crais (born 1953), crime novelist
- Oliver Crane (born 1998), rower
- Clifford Ann Creed (born 1938), pro golfer
- Scott Crichton (born 1954), state district court judge in Shreveport
- Greg Cromer (born 1958), state representative from St. Tammany Parish
- Brenham C. Crothers (1905–1984), politician
- John David Crow (1935–2015), football player and coach, born in Union Parish
- Marvin T. Culpepper (1908–1970), politician
- Charles Milton Cunningham (1877–1936), educator, lawyer, newspaperman, politician
- Milton Joseph Cunningham (1842–1916), state representative and state senator; state attorney general (1884–88 and 1892–1900)
- Cupid (born 1982), R&B singer
- Currensy (born 1981), rapper
- Joseph T. Curry (1895–1961), politician; planter
- Israel B. Curtis (1932–2012), politician from Alexandria
- Jacob Cutrera (born 1988), middle linebacker for the Jacksonville Jaguars

== D ==
- Casey Daigle (born 1981), former MLB pitcher
- Lauren Daigle (born 1991), Christian music artist
- Mike Danahay (born 1957), state representative for Calcasieu Parish (since 2008)
- Stormy Daniels (born 1979), porn actress, stripper
- Jay Dardenne (born 1954), former state senator, Louisiana secretary of state, and lieutenant governor (since 2010); candidate for governor (2015)
- George W. D'Artois (1925–1977), Shreveport public safety commissioner (1962–76)
- Buster Davis (born 1985), wide receiver for the San Diego Chargers
- Edwin Adams Davis (1904–1994), historian
- Glen Davis (born 1986), power forward and center for LSU and the Los Angeles Clippers
- Jackson B. Davis (1918–2016), attorney and former state senator
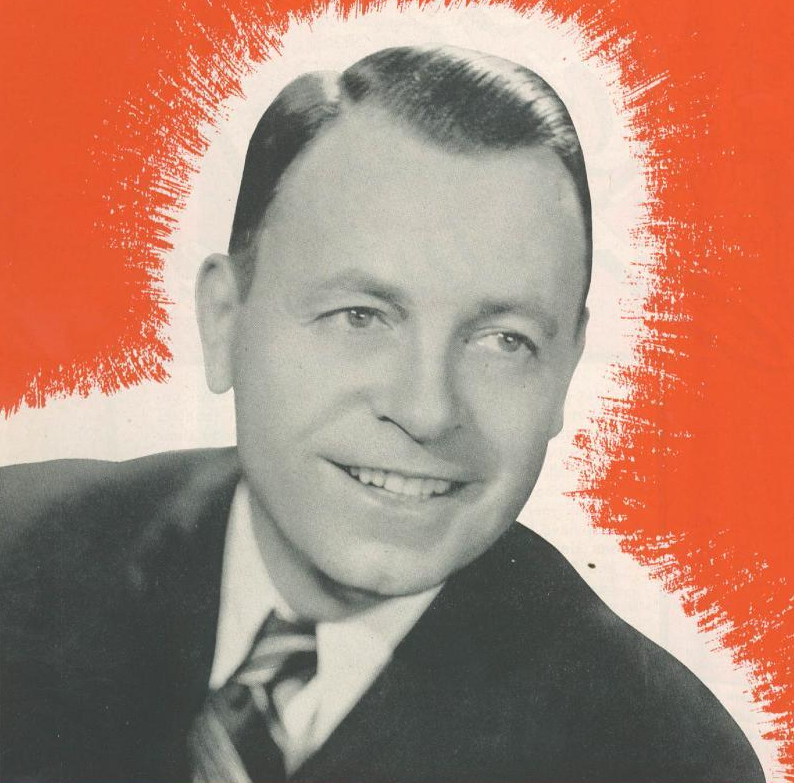
- Jimmie Davis
  Jimmie Davis (1899–2000), singer, governor of Louisiana
- Willie Davis (1934–2020), Hall of Fame defensive end for the Cleveland Browns and Green Bay Packers
- Keyunta Dawson (born 1985), defensive end for the Indianapolis Colts
- Jay Dean (born 1953), mayor of Longview, Texas, 2005–15; incoming Republican member of the Texas House of Representatives, effective 2017; reared in Opelousas
- Cleveland Dear (1888–1950), politician
- Michael E. DeBakey (1908–2008), pioneering cardiovascular surgeon
- Jefferson J. DeBlanc (1921–2007), World War II fighter pilot and flying ace, recipient of the Medal of Honor
- Edmond Dede (1827–1903), musician, composer
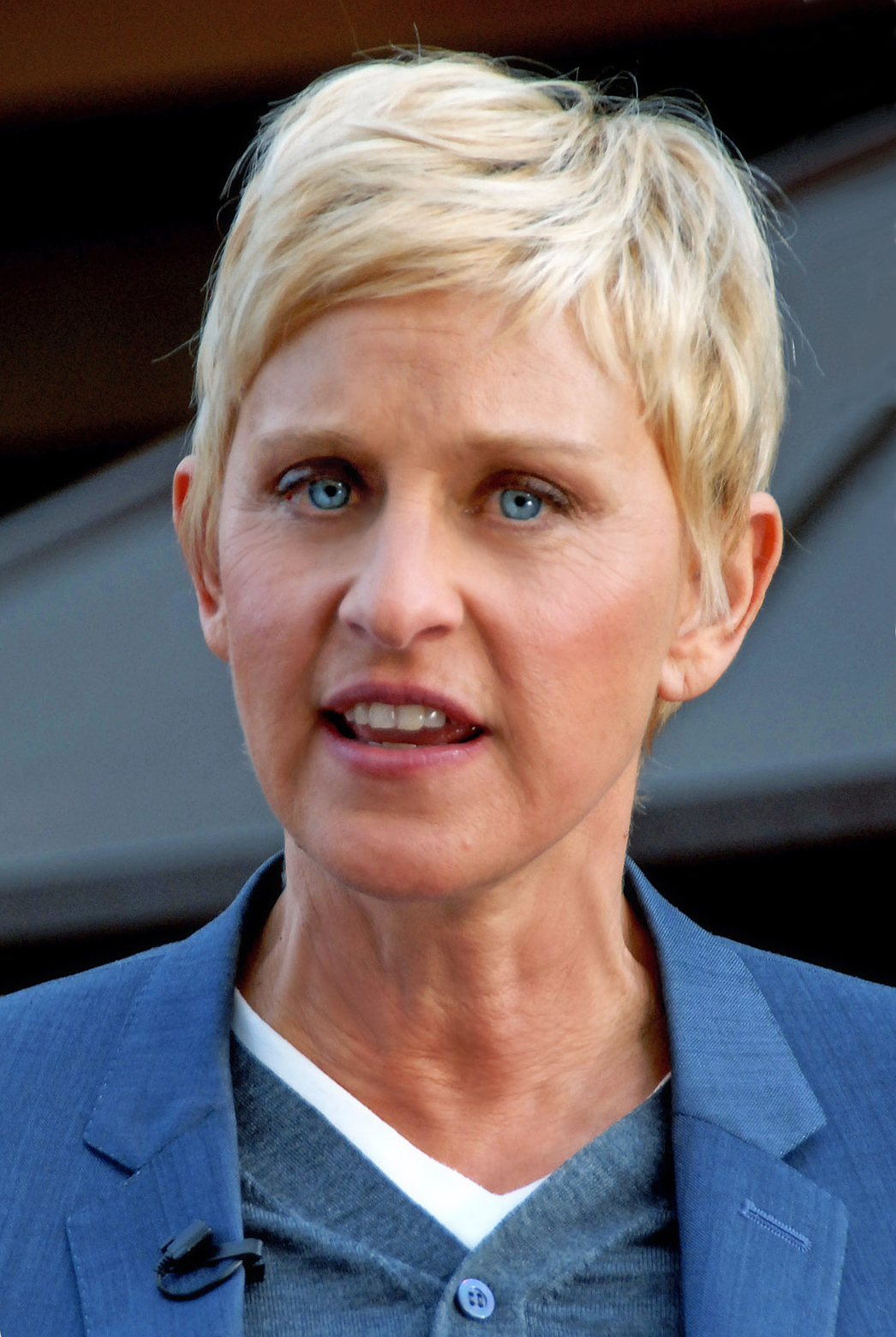
- Ellen DeGeneres
  Ellen DeGeneres (born 1958), comedian, actress, television personality
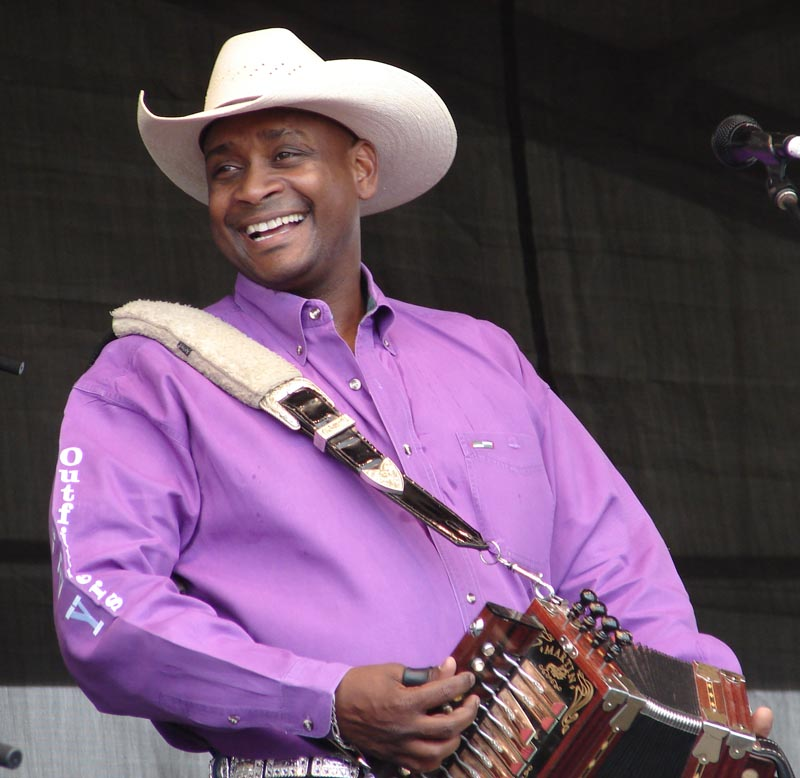
- Geno Delafose
  Geno Delafose (born 1971), zydeco musician
- John Delafose (1939–1994), zydeco musician
- Joe Delaney (1958–1983), running back for Northwestern State University and for the Kansas City Chiefs; died saving children from swimming hole
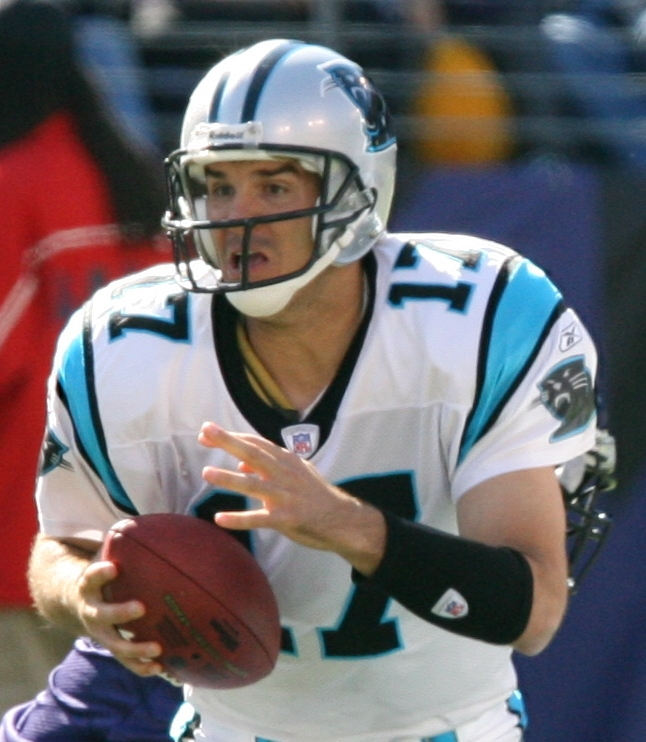
- Jake Delhomme
  Jake Delhomme (born 1975), quarterback for University of Louisiana at Lafayette and for Carolina Panthers in Super Bowl XXXVIII
- David Dellucci (born 1973), MLB outfielder, played primarily with the Arizona Diamondbacks
- Numa T. Delouche (1888–1965), state representative from Natchitoches Parish (1944–48)
- George Dement (1922–2014), politician
- Tim Dement (born 1958), amateur boxer who competed at the 1972 Summer Olympics
- James L. Dennis (born 1936), judge of the United States Court of Appeals for the Fifth Circuit; former judge of the Louisiana Supreme Court; former state representative
- Catherine Dent (born 1965), actress, Danni Sofer on The Shield
- Natalie Desselle-Reid (born 1967), actress
- Lurita Doan (born 1958), administrator of the General Services Administration under President George W. Bush
- James Dobson (born 1936), evangelical Christian author, psychologist, founder of Focus on the Family
- William Joseph "Bill" Dodd (1909–1991), politician
- James R. Domengeaux (1907–1988), U.S. representative; French language cultural activist
- Ronald Dominique (born 1964), serial killer
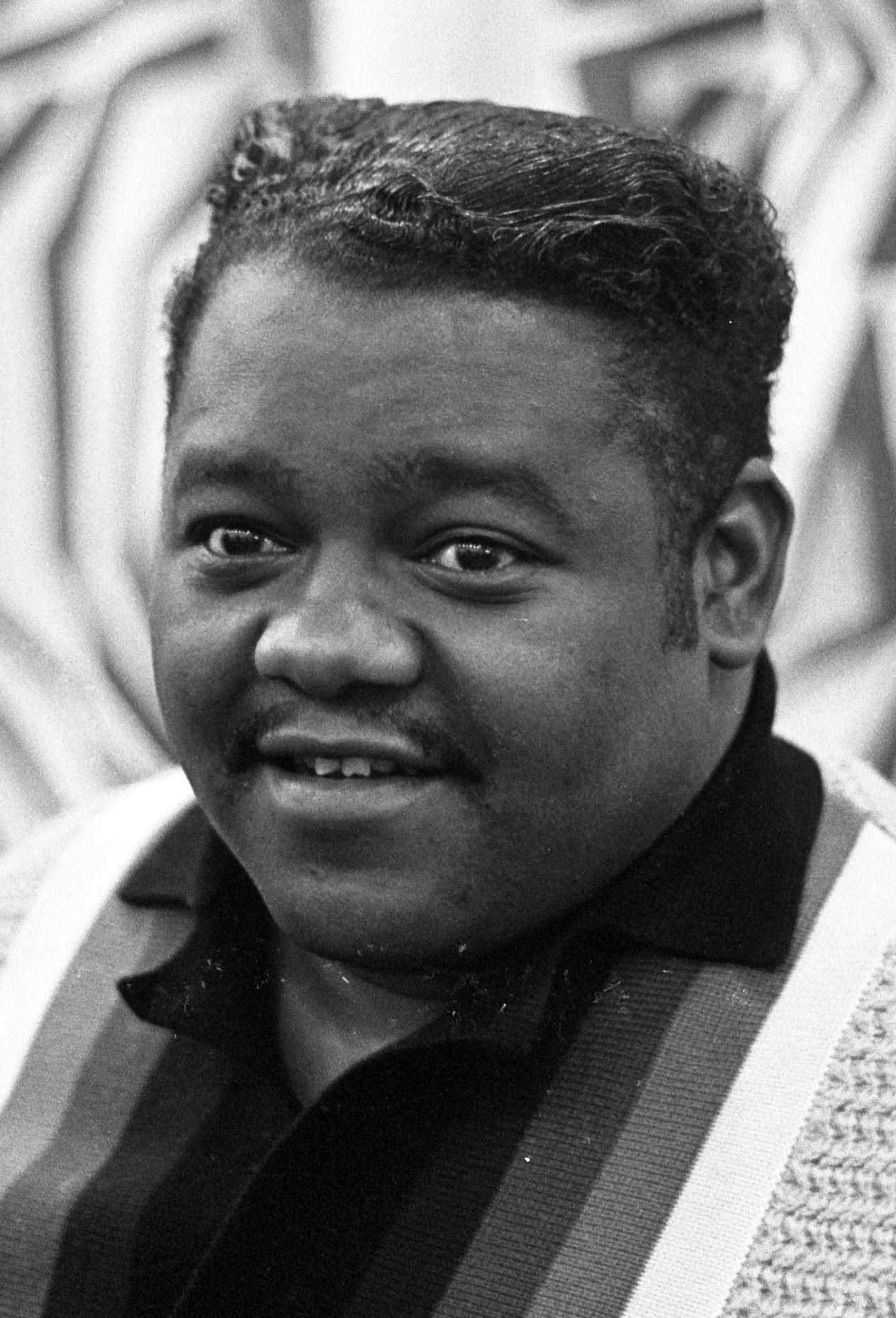
- Fats Domino
  Fats Domino (1928–2017), musician
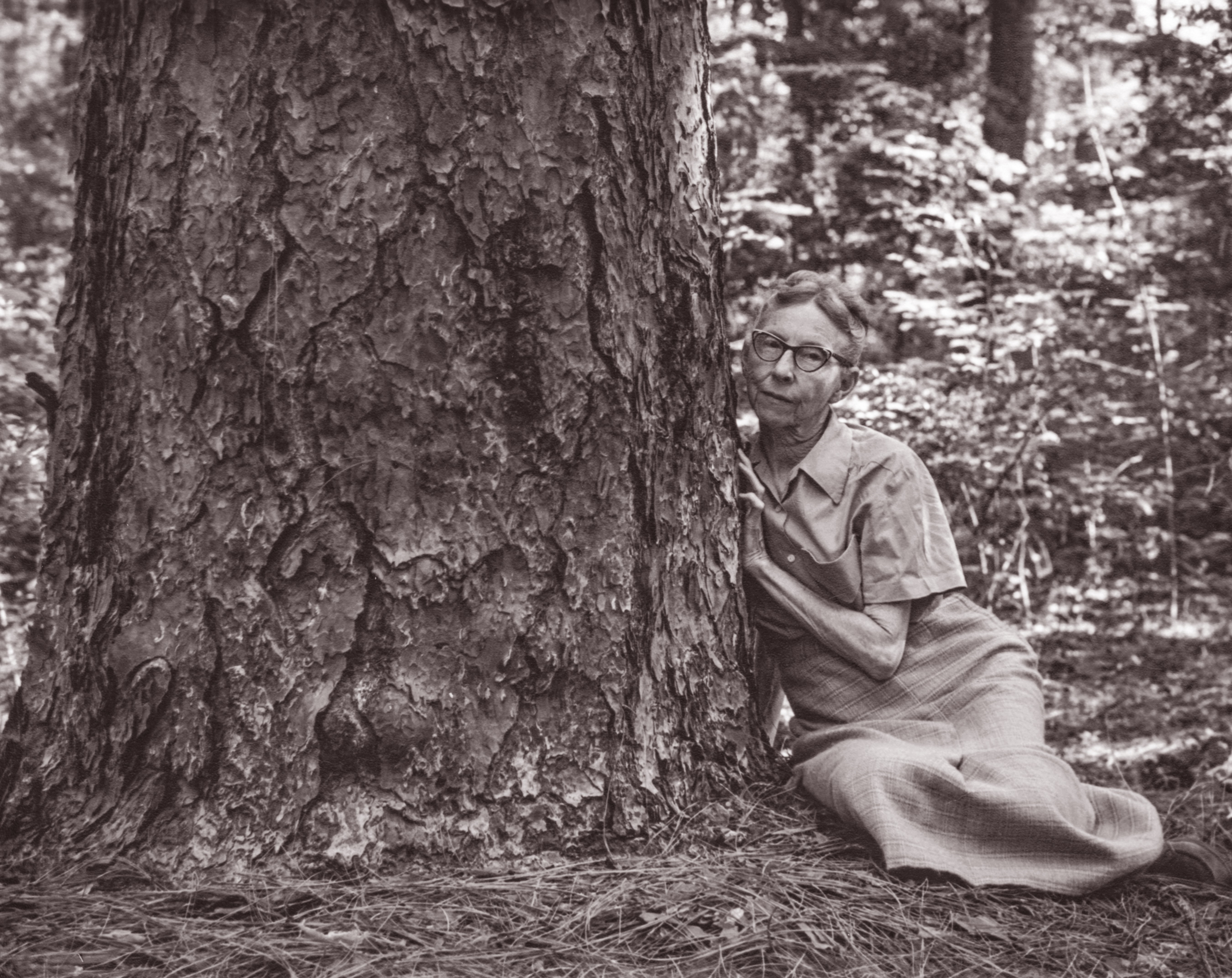
- Caroline Dormon
  Caroline Dormon (1888–1971), naturalist, horticulturist, promoter of Kisatchie National Forest
- Glenn Dorsey (born 1985), defensive end for the San Francisco 49ers
- Lorenzo Doss (born 1994), cornerback for the Denver Broncos
- Cat Doucet (1899–1975), sheriff
- Early Doucet (born 1985), wide receiver for the Arizona Cardinals
- Michael Doucet (born 1951), fiddler
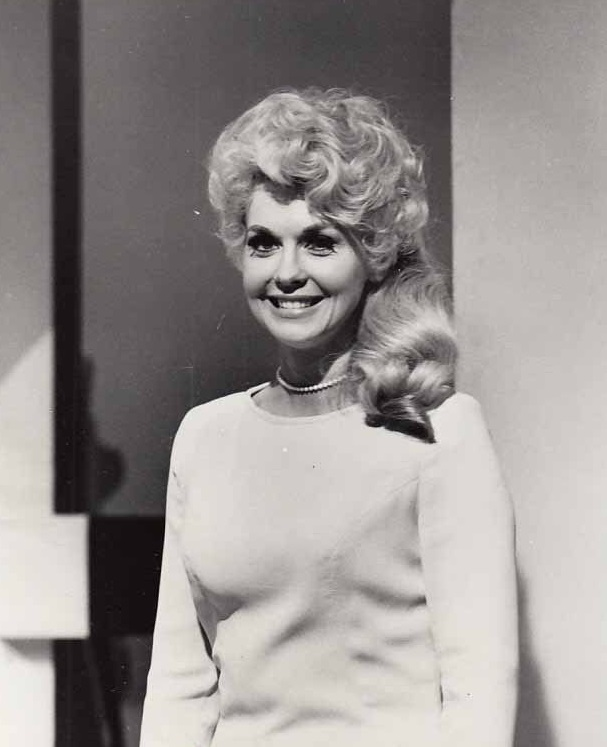
- Donna Douglas
  Donna Douglas (born 1933–2015), actress, The Beverly Hillbillies
- C. H. "Sammy" Downs (1911–1985), member of both houses of the Louisiana legislature from Rapides Parish
- Gil Dozier (1934–2013), Louisiana Commissioner of Agriculture and Forestry (1976–80)
- Dee D. Drell (born 1947), U.S. district judge in Alexandria
- R. Harmon Drew Sr. (1916–1995), city judge, state representative
- Richard Maxwell Drew (1822–1850), judge and state representative
- Clyde Drexler (born 1962), basketball player, University of Houston, NBA and U.S. Olympic team, member of Basketball Hall of Fame
- John Malcolm Duhé Jr. (born 1933), retired state court, U.S. district, and appellate court judge from New Iberia and Lafayette
- Chris Duhon (born 1982), NBA point guard
- David Duke (born 1950), former state representative, former Ku Klux Klansman
- Lance Dunbar (born 1990), running back for the Dallas Cowboys
- Warrick Dunn (born 1975), NFL running back
- Mark Duper (born 1959), Miami Dolphins wide receiver
- Adrian G. Duplantier (1929–2007), U.S. district judge and former state senator from Orleans Parish
- Jay Duplass (born 1973), film director
- Gilbert L. Dupré (1858–1946), politician from St. Landry Parish
- H. Garland Dupré (1873–1924), politician
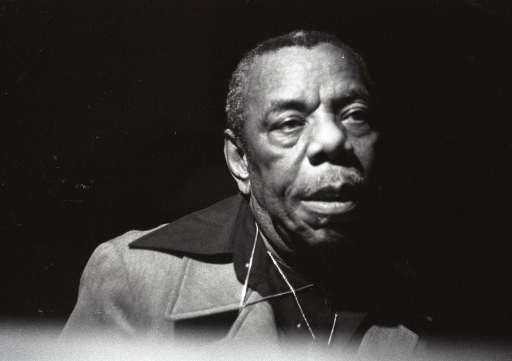
- Champion Jack Dupree
  Champion Jack Dupree (c. 1909–1992), boxer, musician
- Chad Durbin (born 1977), MLB pitcher
- Joey Durel (born 1953), mayor of Lafayette (since 2004)
- Stanwood Duval (born 1942), federal judge in New Orleans
- Wilbur Dyer (1907–1985), member of the Louisiana House of Representatives from Rapides Parish (1974–80)
- W.E. "Bill" Dykes (1925–2015), politician

== E ==
- Richard Eastham (1916–2005), actor
- William C. Edenborn (1848–1926), railroad magnate, steel industrialist, inventor
- Rick Edmonds (born 1956), state representative for East Baton Rouge Parish; Baptist minister
- Mike Edmonson (born 1958), superintendent of the Louisiana State Police (since 2008)
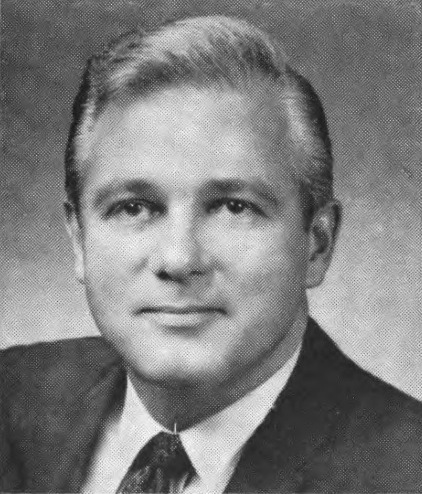
- Edwin Edwards
  Edwin Edwards (1927–2021), governor of Louisiana
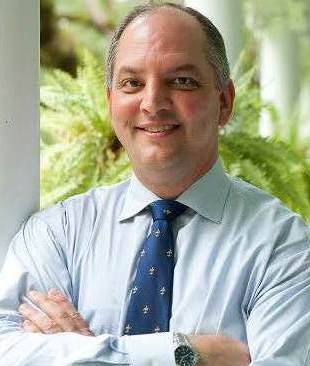
- John Bel Edwards
  John Bel Edwards (born 1966), governor of Louisiana
- Lavar Edwards (born 1990), defensive end for the Dallas Cowboys
- Ronnie Edwards (c. 1952–2016), Baton Rouge politician
- Troy Edwards (born 1977), football player
- Charles Wheaton Elam (1866–1917), politician
- Joseph Barton Elam Sr. (1821–1885), politician
- Allen J. Ellender (1890–1972), member of Congress, United States senator and president pro tem of the Senate
- Frank Burton Ellis (1907–1969), politician
- Faye Emerson (1917–1983), actress
- Julie Emerson (born 1988), state representative for Lafayette and St. Landry parishes
- E. D. Estilette (1833–1919), politician from St. Landry Parish
- Albert Estopinal (1845–1919), politician
- James R. Eubank (1914–1952), lawyer and member of the Louisiana House of Representatives for Rapides Parish
- John D. Ewing (1892–1952), newspaper executive

== F ==
- Jamie Fair (born 1946), former state representative
- Reid Falconer (born 1956), state representative for St. Tammany Parish, effective 2016
- Ralph Falsetta (1914–1999), politician from Ascension Parish
- Alan Faneca (born 1976), NFL offensive guard, member of the Pro Football Hall of Fame
- Rick L. Farrar, state representative from Rapides Parish
- Dillon Farrell (born 1990), center for the San Francisco 49ers
- Clarence Faulk (1909–2010), publisher, broadcaster, businessman from Ruston
- Kevin Faulk (born 1976), New England Patriots running back, LSU Hall of Famer
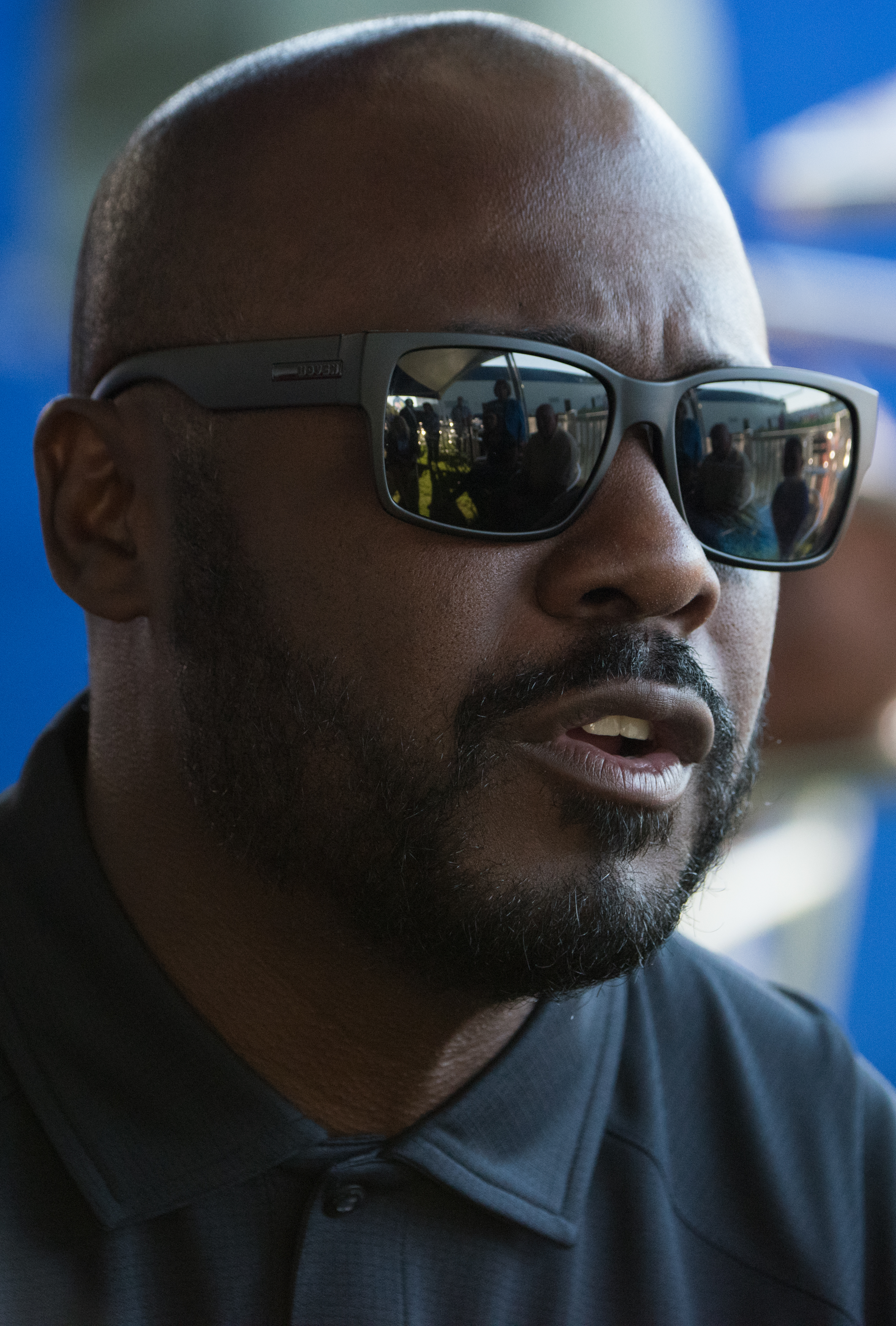
- Marshall Faulk
  Marshall Faulk (born 1973), Hall of Fame running back, television commentator
- Trev Faulk (born 1981), St. Louis Rams linebacker
- William C. Feazel (1895–1965), interim U.S. senator in 1948; former state representative from Ouachita Parish
- Lionel Ferbos (1911–2014), jazz musician from New Orleans
- Jimmy Field (born 1940), Louisiana Public Service Commissioner (1996–2012)
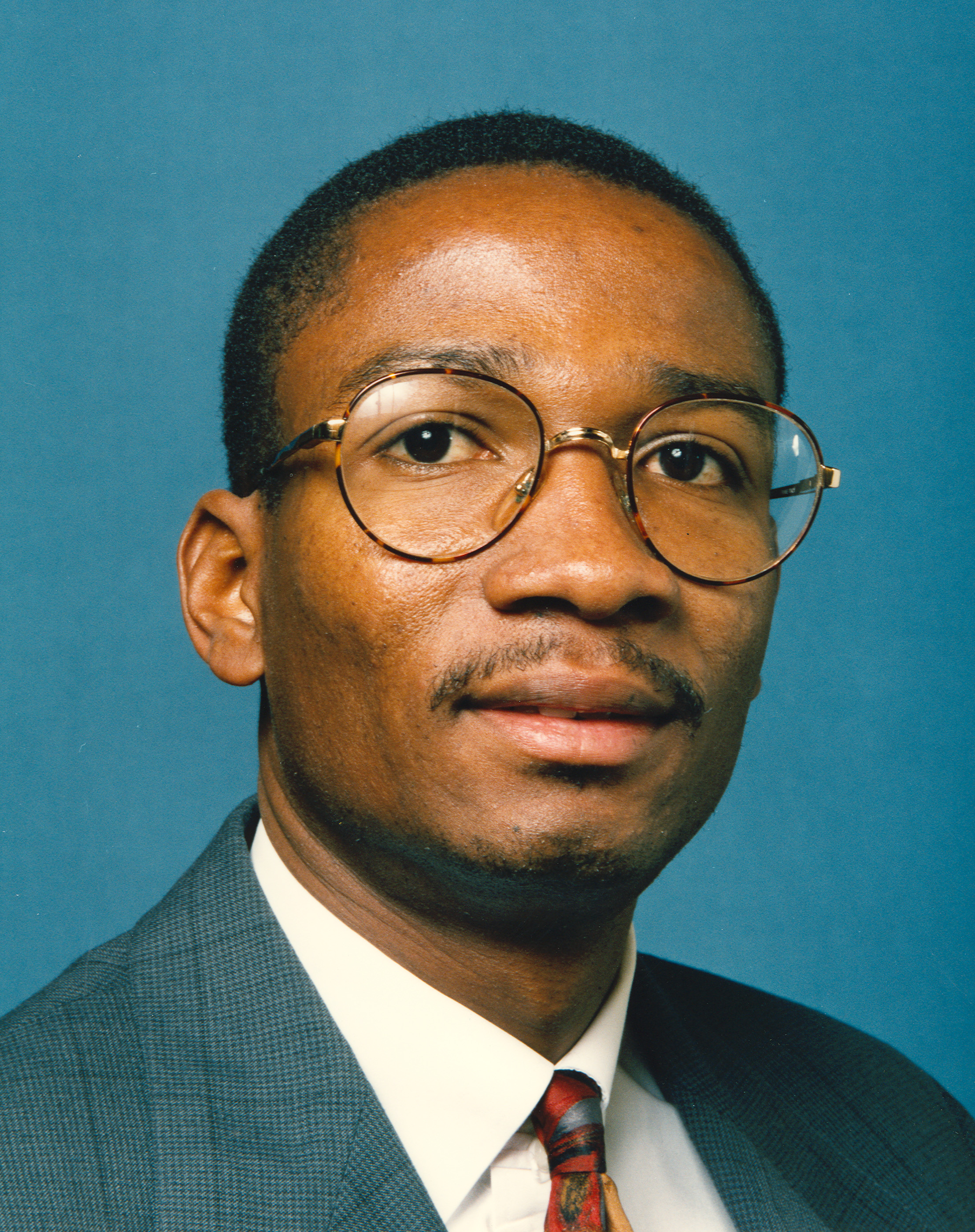
- Cleo Fields
  Cleo Fields (born 1962), politician
- T. T. Fields (1912–1994), politician
- David Filo (born 1966), co-founder of Yahoo!
- Olaf Fink (1914–1973), educator and state senator for Orleans Parish 1956–1972
- Jimmy Fitzmorris (1921–2021), politician, lieutenant governor
- Sean Patrick Flanery (born 1965), actor
- John C. Fleming (born 1952), U.S. representative; medical doctor
- Dan Flores (born 1948), historian of the American West
- D. J. Fluker (born 1991), offensive tackle for the San Diego Chargers
- John Folse (born 1946), chef and restaurateur
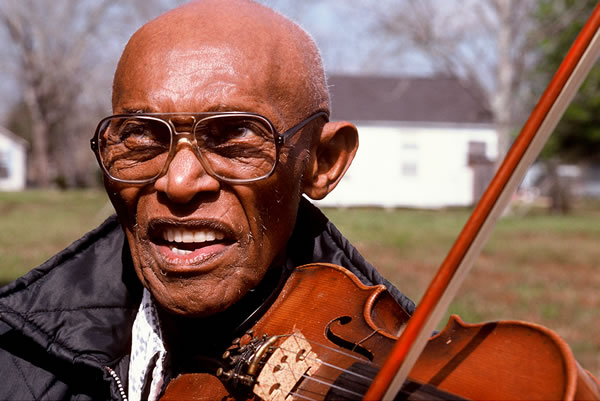
- Canray Fontenot
  Canray Fontenot (1922–1995), fiddler
- Jerry Fontenot (born 1966), assistant coach for the Green Bay Packers
- Mary Alice Fontenot (1910–2003), author
- Mike Fontenot (born 1980), second baseman for the San Francisco Giants
- Elizabeth Erny Foote (born 1953), judge
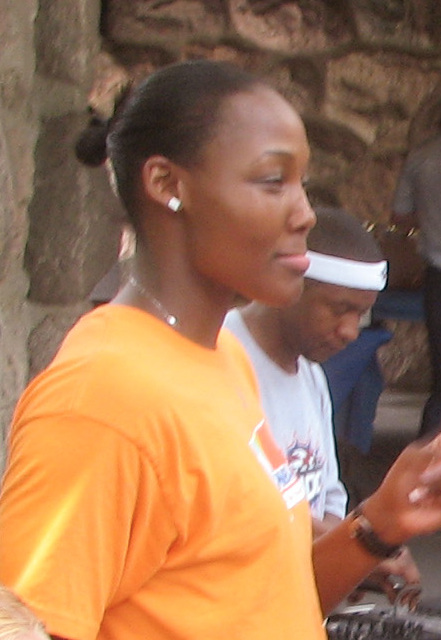
- Cheryl Ford
  Cheryl Ford (born 1981), WNBA player
- Faith Ford (born 1964), actress
- Frankie Ford (1939–2015), singer
- C. B. Forgotston (1945–2016), state government watchdog
- Barbara Forrest (born 20th century), philosopher and prominent critic of the intelligent design movement
- Matt Forte (born 1985), running back for the Chicago Bears
- Ezola B. Foster (1938–2018), conservative political activist, writer, and politician
- Mike Foster (1930–2020), governor of Louisiana
- Murphy J. Foster (1849–1921), governor of Louisiana
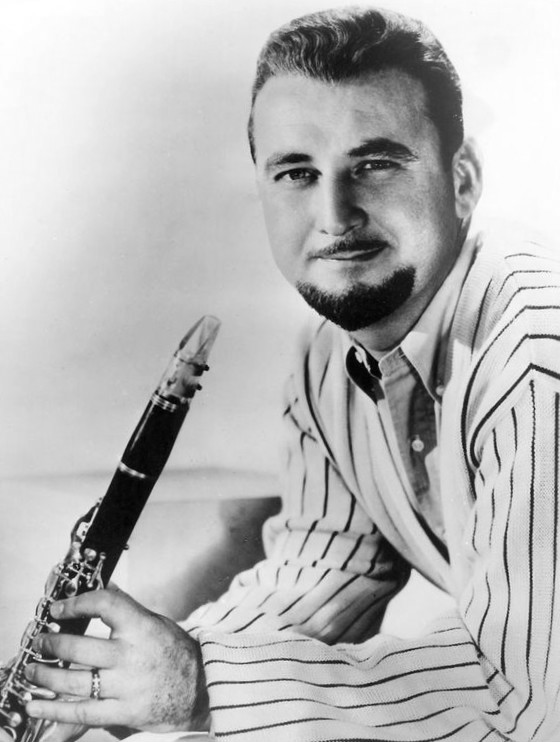
- Pete Fountain
  Pete Fountain (1930–2016), musician
- Mike Francis (born 1946), businessman, Republican former state party chairman
- Keith Frank (born 1972), zydeco musician
- Preston Frank (born 1947), zydeco musician
- Tillman Franks (1920–2006), country musician and manager
- Anthony Freeman (1988–2018), Catholic religious and author
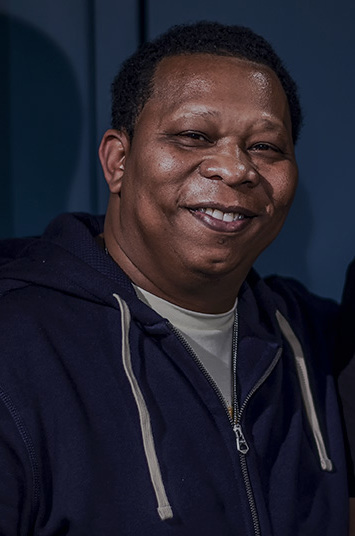
- Mannie Fresh
  Mannie Fresh (born 1974), record producer, musician
- J. Isaac Friedman (1877–1949), state representative and state senator from Natchitoches Parish
- Leon Friedman (1886–1948), state representative from Natchitoches Parish (1932–40)
- W. C. Friley (1845–1911), educator and Baptist clergyman
- Lawrence T. Fuglaar (1895–1972), state representative from Rapides Parish (1948–52); drowning victim
- Hoffman Franklin Fuller (born 1932), professor emeritus at Tulane University Law School, authority on tax law
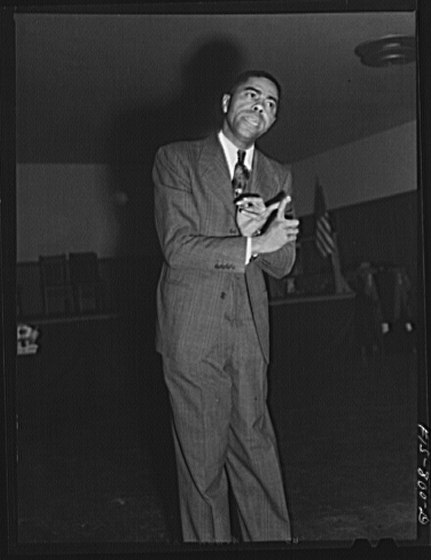
- Samuel B. Fuller
  Samuel B. Fuller (1905–1988), founder and president of the Fuller Products Company, publisher of the New York Age and Pittsburgh Courier
- Henry L. Fuqua (1865–1926), governor of Louisiana (1924–26, his death)
- J. B. Fuselier (1901–1975), Cajun musician from Oberlin, Louisiana
- Mike Futrell (born 1960), politician

== G ==
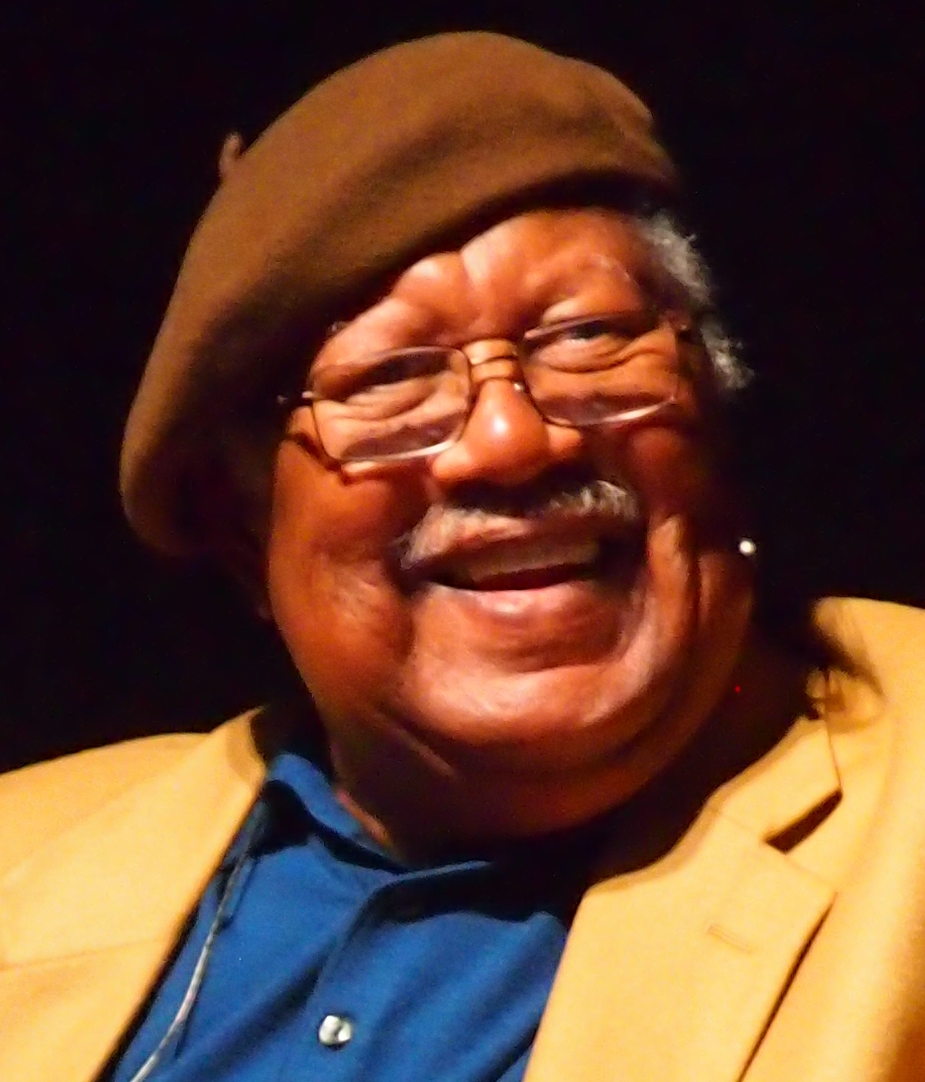
- Ernest J. Gaines
  Ernest J. Gaines (1933–2019), author
- Randal Gaines (born 1955), African American; lawyer; educator; state representative for St. Charles and St. John the Baptist parishes (since 2012)
- Daniel F. Galouye (1920–1976), science fiction writer
- Count Bernardo de Gálvez (1746–1786), Spanish governor; viceroy of New Spain
- John Sidney Garrett (1921–2005), former Speaker of the Louisiana House of Representatives from Claiborne Parish
- Jim Garrison (1921–1992), former New Orleans district attorney; later a state judge
- Robert T. Garrity Jr. (born 1949), former member of the Louisiana House of Representatives for Jefferson Parish
- Kevin Gates (born 1986), rapper
- Chad Gaudin (born 1983), MLB pitcher
- Tim Gautreaux (born 1947), author
- Randall Gay (born 1982), cornerback for the New Orleans Saints
- Johnny Giavotella (born 1987), second baseman for the Los Angeles Angels
- Philip H. Gilbert (1870–1932), politician; former lieutenant governor
- Mickey Gilley (born 1936), musician; singer; nightclub owner
- David Ginn (1951–2006), state senator for Morehouse Parish (1980–88)
- George Girard (1930–1957), musician
- Hap Glaudi (1912–1989), New Orleans sports journalist
- Edgar Godbold (1879–1952), president of Louisiana College (1942–51)
- H. N. Goff (1910–1978), state representative from Rapides Parish (1952–56)
- Victor Gold (1928–2017), journalist and political consultant
- John Goodman (born 1952), actor
- Cletis Gordon (born 1982), cornerback for the United Football League's Florida Tuskers
- Stephen Gostkowski (born 1984), placekicker for the New England Patriots
- Louis Moreau Gottschalk (1829–1869), pianist; composer
- Lucille May Grace (1900–1957), first woman in statewide elected office as register of state lands
- Shirley Ann Grau (1929–2020), writer
- Webster "Webbie" Gradney Jr. (born 1985), rapper
- Danny Granger (born 1983), small forward for the Philadelphia 76ers
- Todd Graves (born 1972), entrepreneur and founder of Raising Cane's Chicken Fingers
- Veleka Gray (born 1951), actress; writer; producer
- Douglas D. "Doug" Green (born c. 1950), politician
- Howard Green (born 1979), nose tackle for the Green Bay Packers
- BenJarvus Green-Ellis (born 1985), running back for the New England Patriots
- Thomas A. "Tom" Greene (born 1948), former state senator
- John Grenier (1930–2007), Republican politician in Alabama; born in New Orleans
- Grits Gresham (1922–2008), sportsman; journalist
- J. D. Grey (1906–1985), clergyman
- Robert Groves (born 1948), sociologist; Director of the United States Census Bureau under U.S. President Barack Obama
- Anthony Guarisco Jr. (born 1938), politician
- Dudley A. Guglielmo (1909–2005), insurance commissioner
- Dick Guidry (1929–2014), politician; businessman from Lafourche Parish
- Greg G. Guidry (born 1960), member of the Louisiana Supreme Court
- Richard Guidry (1949–2008), advocate of French language in Louisiana
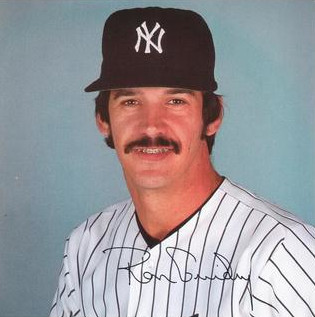
- Ron Guidry
  Ron Guidry (born 1950), Cy Young Award-winning pitcher for the New York Yankees
- Brandon Guillory (born 1985), businessman
- Elbert Guillory (born 1944), politician
- G. Earl Guinn (1912–2004), president of Louisiana College (1951–75)
- Bryant Gumbel (born 1948), television journalist
- Greg Gumbel (born 1946), sportscaster
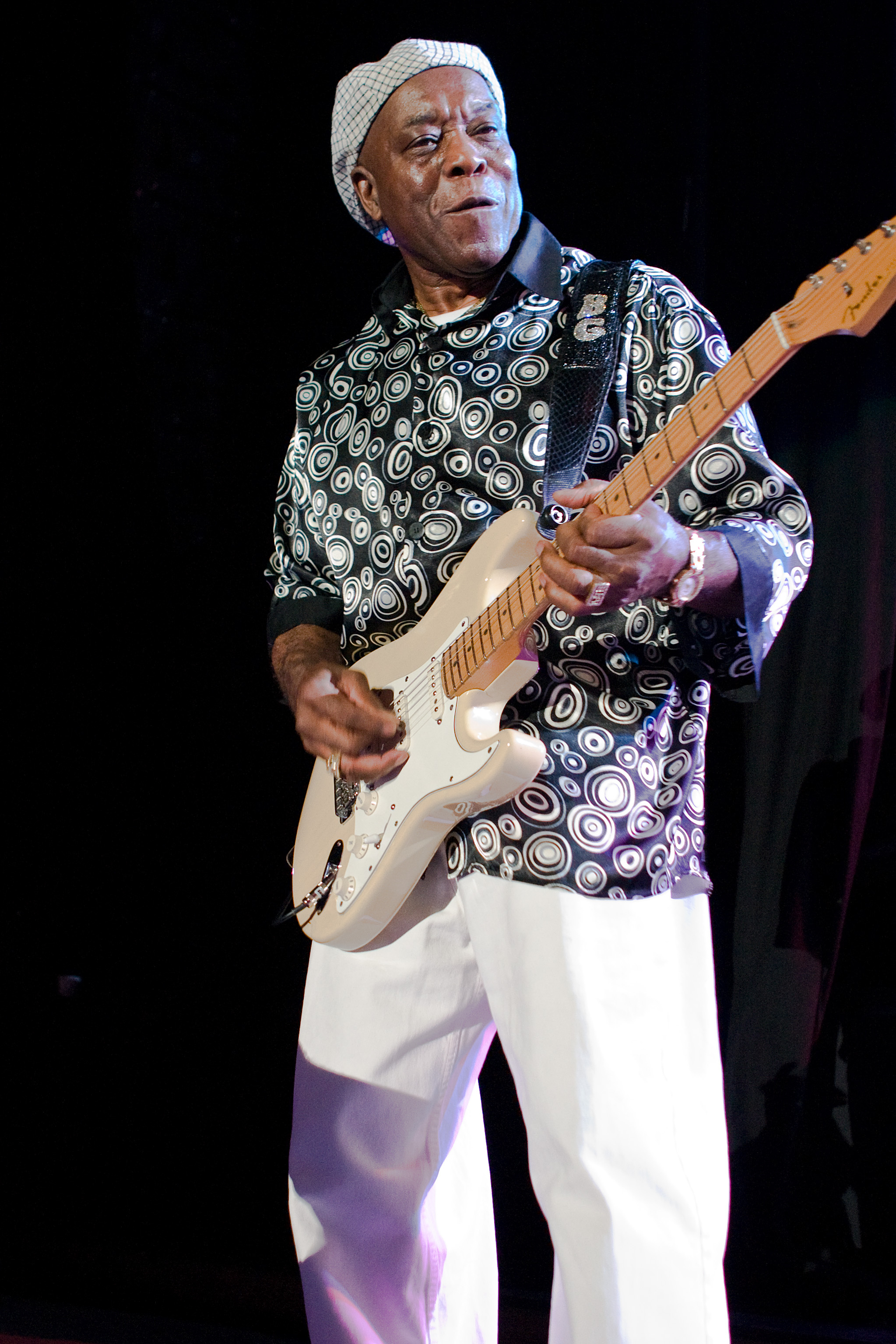
- Buddy Guy
  Buddy Guy (born 1936), blues musician

== H ==
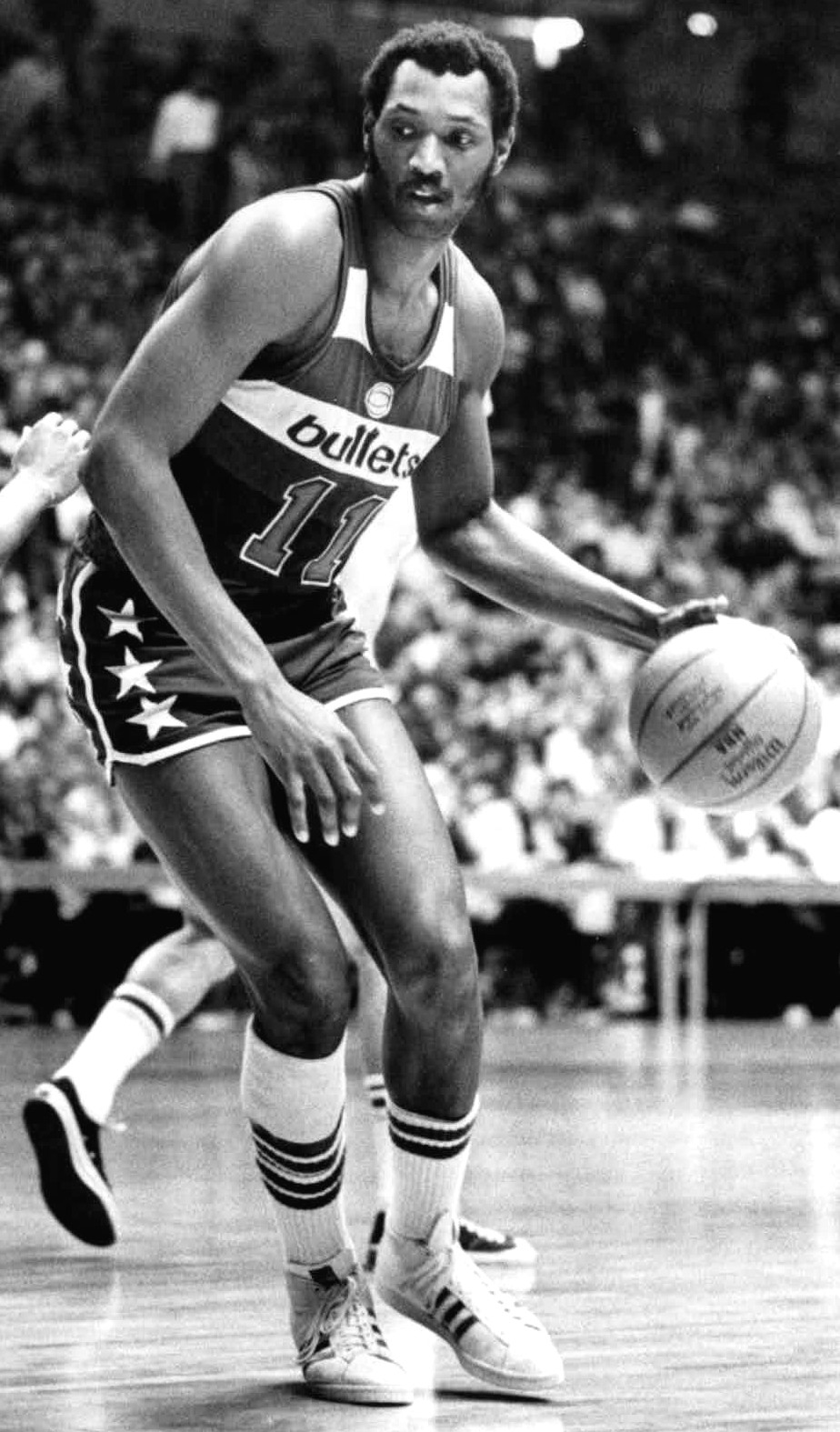
Elvin Hayes

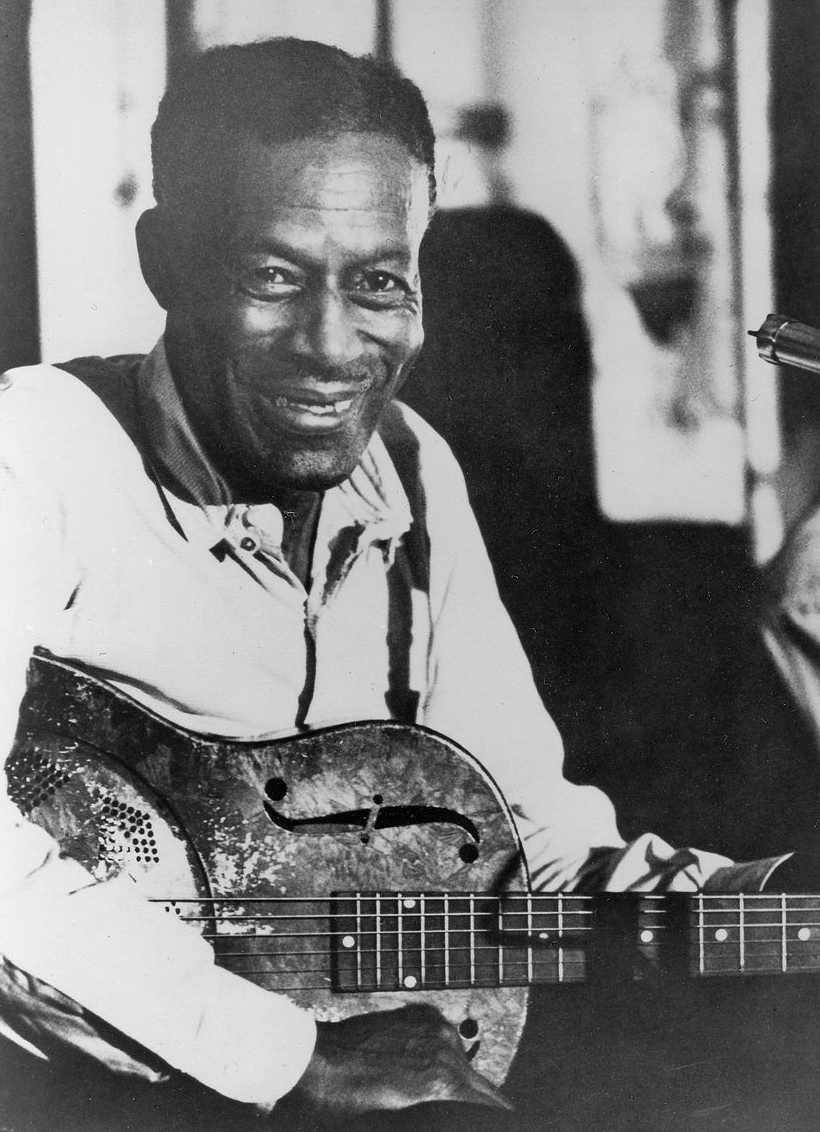
Son House

- Billy Hagan (1932–2007), NASCAR owner and racer, businessman
- Richard T. Haik (born 1950), United States district judge for the Western District of Louisiana
- Ted Haik (born 1945), politician
- Jeff Hall (born 1951), state representative for Rapides Parish (since 2015)
- Joe Hall (1971–2024), la la and Cajun musician
- Pike Hall Jr. (1931–1999), judge from Shreveport
- Rusty Hamer (1947–1990), child actor
- Henry E. Hardtner (1870–1935), lumberman, conservationist, politician, founder of Urania
- John Spencer Hardy (1913–2012), lieutenant general in the United States Air Force
- Paul Jude Hardy (born 1942), state senator, secretary of state, lieutenant governor
- Robert Harling (born 1951), playwright, screenwriter and film director, wrote Steel Magnolias
- Winsor Harmon (born 1963), actor, The Bold and the Beautiful
- Claudell Harris Jr. (born 2002), basketball player in the Israeli Basketball Premier League
- Lance Harris (born 1961), state representative
- Will Harris (born 1984), relief pitcher for the Houston Astros
- Damon Harrison (born 1988), nose tackle for the New York Giants
- Joe Harrison (born c. 1952), state representative
- Ryan Harrison (born 1992), professional tennis player
- Leonard R. "Pop" Hataway (born 1939), former sheriff of Grant Parish
- Torrence "Lil Boosie" Hatch (born 1982), rapper
- Jason Hatcher (born 1982), defensive end for the Dallas Cowboys
- Kenny Havard (born 1971), politician
- Elvin Hayes (born 1945), Hall of Fame basketball player
- Hunter Hayes (born 1991), country singer
- William Wright Heard (1853–1926), governor of Louisiana (1900–04)
- Bobby Hebert (born 1960), New Orleans Saints quarterback known as "Cajun Cannon"
- Felix Edward Hébert (1901–1979), journalist, politician
- Paul M. Hebert (1907–1977), judge, Louisiana State University Law Center dean
- Troy Hebert (born 1966), politician
- Lee Hedges (born 1929), champion football coach in Shreveport
- Talmadge L. Heflin (born 1940), former member of the Texas House of Representatives
- Marie Alice Heine (1858–1925), first American Princess of Monaco
- Betty Heitman (1929–1994), Republican politician
- David Heitmeier (born 1961), state senator for Orleans Parish (since 2008); optometrist
- Francis C. Heitmeier (born 1950), former state senator for Orleans Parish; lawyer and lobbyist
- Knute Heldner (1875–1952), impressionist artist
- Lillian Hellman (1905–1984), playwright and screenwriter
- Devery Henderson (born 1982), wide receiver for the New Orleans Saints
- Lloyd Hendrick (1908–1951), Shreveport lawyer and state senator for DeSoto and Caddo parishes (1940–48)
- Ellis Henican (born 1958), journalist, commentator, talk show host
- Jeff Hennessy (1929–2014), trampoline coach
- Leigh Hennessy, world champion gymnast and movie stuntwoman
- Shelley Hennig (born 1987), actress, Days of Our Lives
- Charlie Hennigan (1935–2017), football player
- Gilbert Franklin Hennigan (1883–1960), politician
- Cameron Henry (born 1974), politician
- Clarence "Frogman" Henry (born 1937), singer, musician
- Gloria Henry (1923–2021), actress, CBS's Dennis the Menace
- Bob Hensgens (born 1955), state representative
- George Herriman (1880–1944), Krazy Kat cartoonist
- Louis Herthum (born 1956), actor, Murder, She Wrote
- Jacob Hester (born 1985), fullback for the San Diego Chargers
- Emma Churchman Hewitt (1850–1921), writer, journalist
- W. W. Hicks (1843–1925), member of the Louisiana House of Representatives for Webster Parish (1900–04)
- Andrew Higgins (1886–1952), shipbuilder, industrialist
- Clay Higgins (born 1961), U.S. representative for Louisiana's 3rd congressional district, beginning 2017
- Stephanie Hilferty (born 1985), state representative for Orleans and Jefferson parishes since 2016
- Kenny Hill (born 1958), NFL defensive back
- Corey Hilliard (born 1985), offensive tackle for the Detroit Lions
- Quin Hillyer (born 1964), columnist and editor
- Donald E. Hines (1933–2019), politician and physician
- Walker Hines (born 1984), state representative from Orleans Parish
- Al Hirt (1922–1999), musician
- Valarie Hodges (born 1955), politician
- Melvin L. Holden (born 1952), first African-American mayor of Baton Rouge
- Cheryl Holdridge (1944–2009), actor
- Trindon Holliday (born 1986), wide receiver and return specialist for the New York Giants
- Earl Holliman (born 1928), actor
- Harry Hollins (1932–1989), state representative for Calcasieu Parish 1964–1980
- Paul Hollis (born 1972), state representative from St. Tammany Parish
- Clyde C. Holloway (1943–2016), former US representative; member of the Louisiana Public Service Commission
- Ben F. Holt (1925–1995), politician
- Jay F. Honeycutt (born 1937), former director of the Kennedy Space Center
- Russel L. Honoré (born 1947), general during Hurricane Katrina relief
- Dodie Horton (born 1956), state representative for Bossier Parish, effective 2016
- Son House (1902–1988), blues singer and guitarist
- TJ House (born 1989), pitcher for the Cleveland Indians
- Alton Hardy Howard (1925–2006), co-founder of Howard Brothers Discount Stores; gospel songwriter
- Jaye Howard (born 1988), nose tackle for the Kansas City Chiefs
- V. E. Howard (1911–2000), Church of Christ clergyman, founder of radio International Gospel Hour
- W. L. "Jack" Howard (1921–2004), mayor of Monroe and partner of Howard Brothers Discount Stores
- Arlene Howell (born 1939), Miss USA 1958 and actress: Bourbon Street Beat
- Jerry Huckaby (born 1941), US representative
- Jefferson D. Hughes III (born 1952), associate justice of the Louisiana Supreme Court since 2013
- William Clark Hughes (1868–1930), Speaker of the Louisiana House of Representatives (1926–28); Bossier Parish farmer
- Melvin Hunt (born 1969), assistant coach of the Dallas Mavericks
- Clementine Hunter (c. 1886–1988), folk artist
- Jeffrey Hunter (1926–1969), actor and producer
- Marcus Hunter (born 1979), politician and attorney
- Carolyn Huntoon (born 1940), scientist and government official
- Mike "Pete" Huval (born c. 1956), politician and insurance agent

== I ==
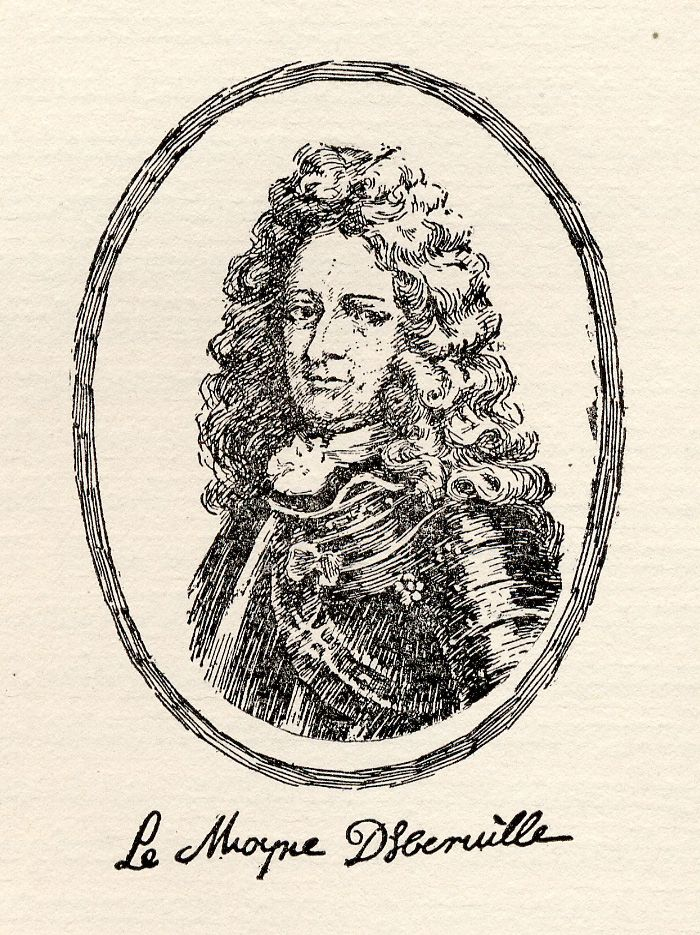
- Pierre Le Moyne d'Iberville
  Pierre Le Moyne, Sieur d'Iberville (1661–1706), founder of the French colony of Louisiana of New France
- Iron Eyes Cody (1904–1999), actor; native of Kaplan
- Walter Isaacson (born 1952), author; journalist; president and chief executive officer, Aspen Institute
- Barry Ivey (born 1979), politician

== J ==
- George W. Jack (1875–1924), federal judge
- Wellborn Jack (1907–1991), state representative from Caddo Parish (1940–64)
- Whitfield Jack (1906–1989), Shreveport attorney and United States Army colonel in World War II and United States Army Reserve major general
- Donte Jackson (born 1995), NFL cornerback
- John M. Jackson (born 1950), actor, JAG
- Lisa Jackson (born 1962), administrator of the Environmental Protection Agency under Barack Obama
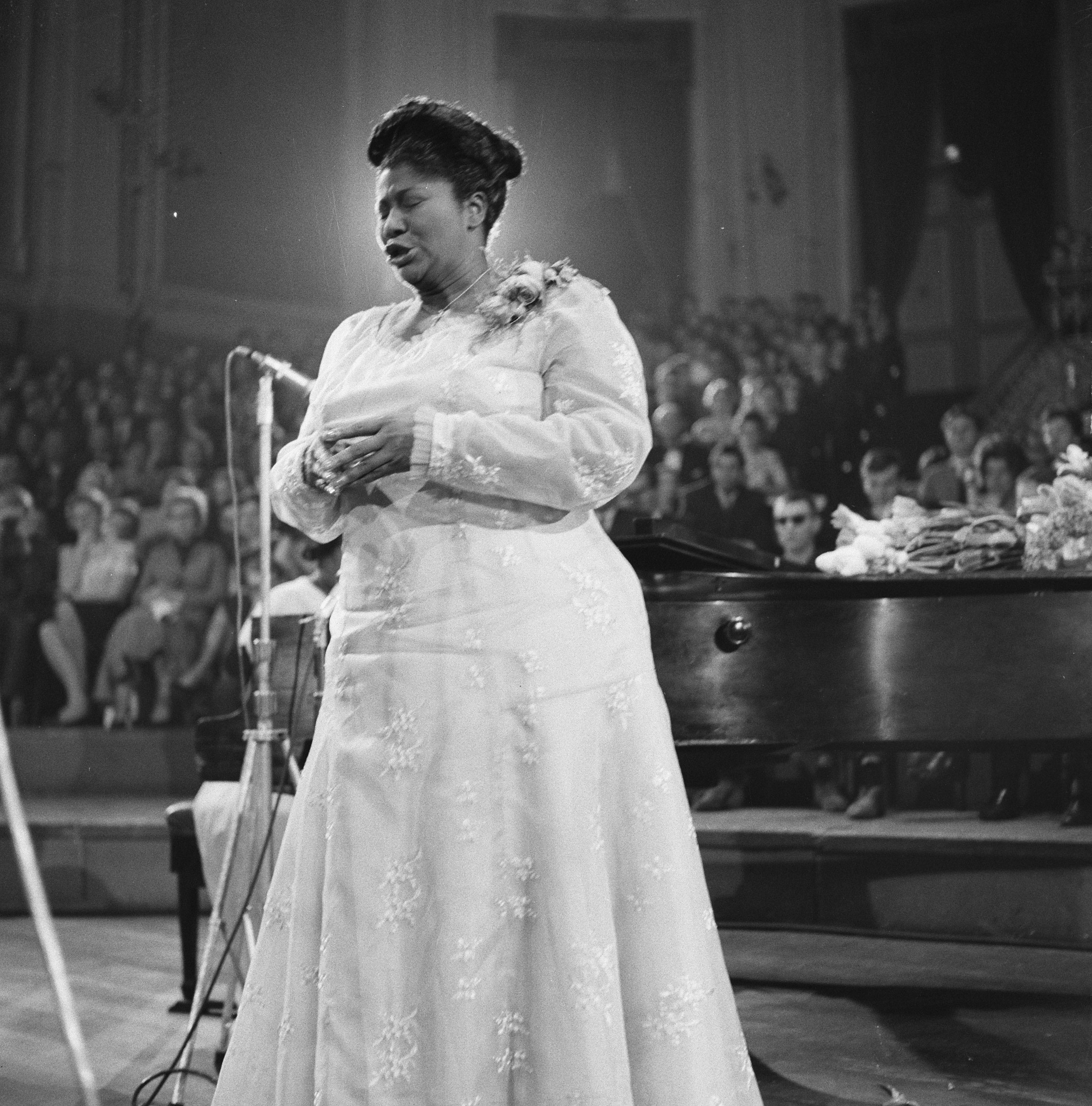
- Mahalia Jackson
  Mahalia Jackson (1911–1972), gospel singer
- Randy Jackson (born 1955), guitarist and lead singer of rock band Zebra
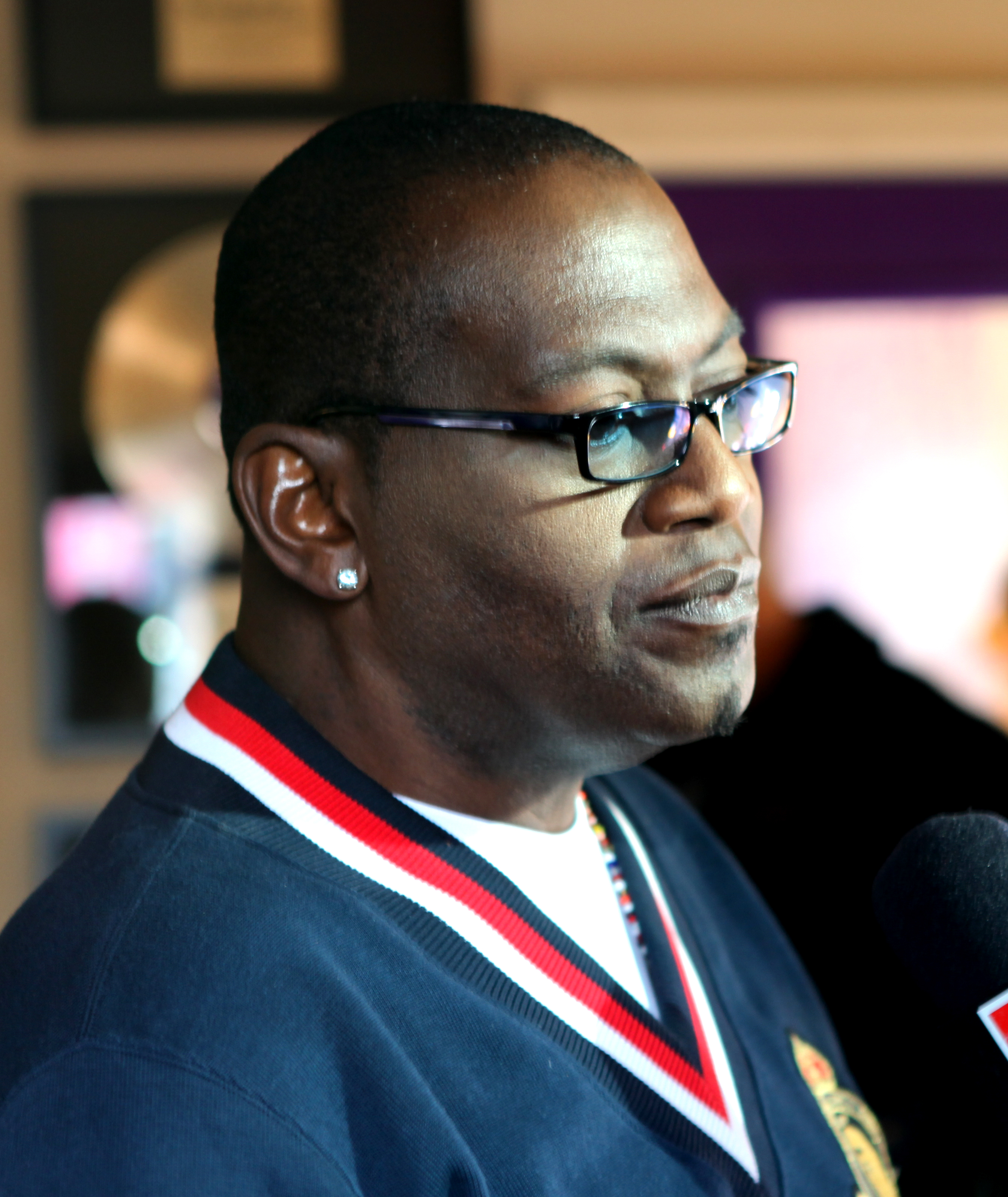
- Randy Jackson
  Randy Jackson (born 1956), musician, entrepreneur, television personality
- Tyson Jackson (born 1986), defensive tackle for the Atlanta Falcons
- Brandon Jacobs (born 1982), running back for the New York Giants
- Angie Jakusz (1980–2021), contestant on Survivor: Palau
- Bradie James (born 1981), linebacker for the Houston Texans
- Antawn Jamison (born 1976), NBA player for the Los Angeles Lakers
- Rajarsi Janakananda (1892–1955), former president of the Self-Realization Fellowship
- JayDaYoungan (1998–2022), rapper
- Lemuel Jeanpierre (born 1987), center for the Seattle Seahawks
- Patrick O. Jefferson (born 1968), state representative for Bienville, Claiborne, and Lincoln parishes (since 2012); lawyer in Arcadia
- Eddie Jemison (born 1963), actor, Hung, Bruce Almighty, and Ocean's Eleven and its sequels
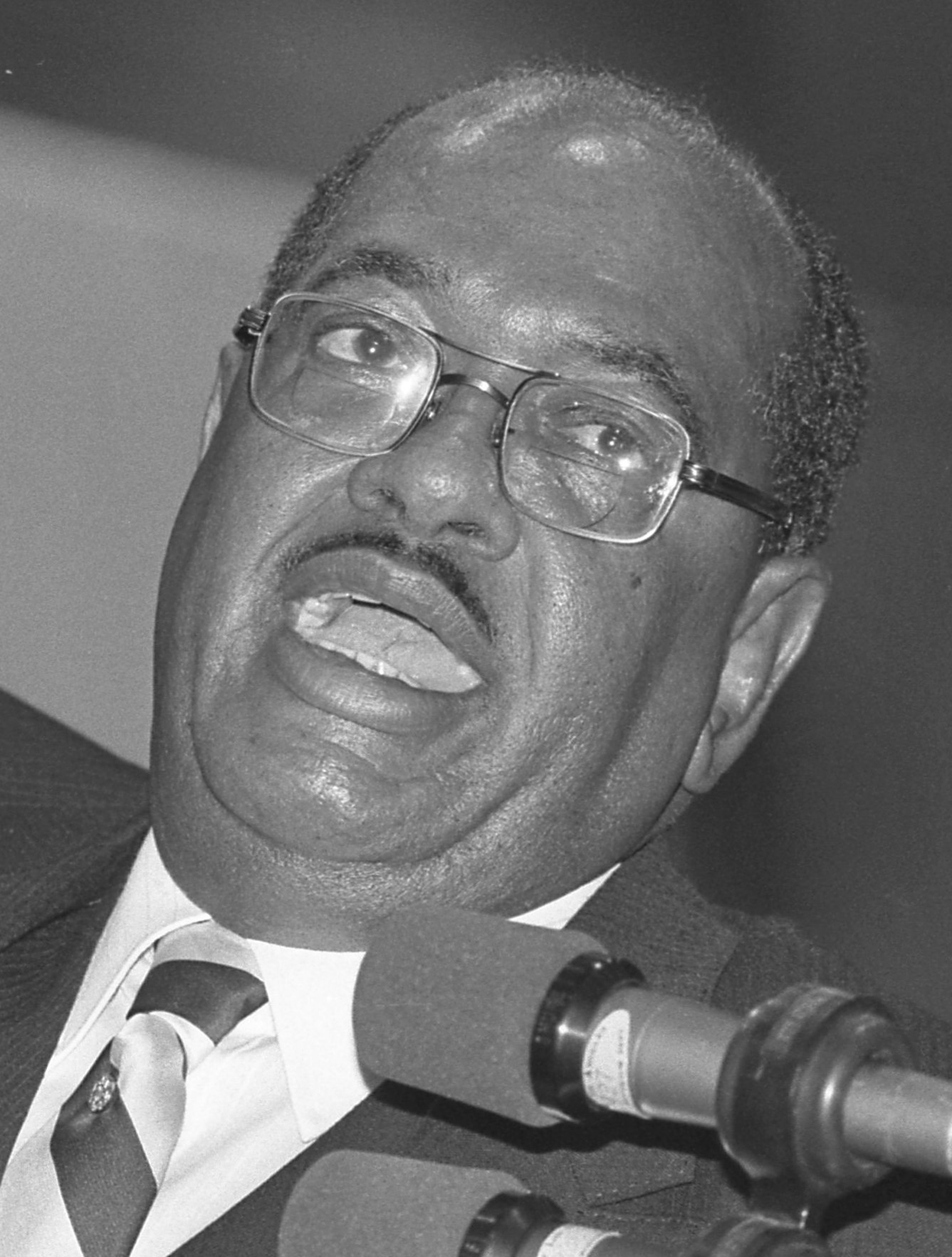
- T. J. Jemison
  T. J. Jemison (1918–2013), clergyman and organizer of the Baton Rouge bus boycott
- Faith Jenkins (born 20th century), attorney, legal commentator, Miss Louisiana 2000
- Mykel Shannon Jenkins (born 1969), actor, The Bold and the Beautiful
- Woody Jenkins (born 1947), politician, newspaper publisher
- Bobby Jindal (born 1971), governor of Louisiana
- Ronnie Johns (born 1949), politician
- Andrew R. Johnson (1856–1933), state senator and mayor of Homer; named Ashland, Louisiana
- Avery Johnson (born 1965), NBA player and coach
- Bernette Joshua Johnson (born 1943), chief justice of the Louisiana Supreme Court since 2013; associate justice, 1994–2013
- Bill Johnson (1872–1972), jazz musician
- Damaris Johnson (born 1989), wide receiver and punt returner for the Philadelphia Eagles
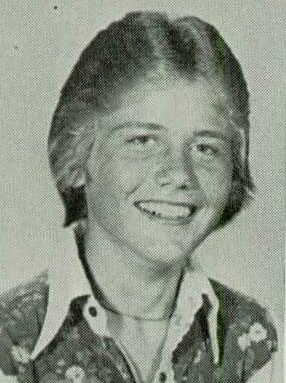
- Dan Johnson
  Dan Johnson, Kentucky politician
- Mike Johnson (born 1972), U.S. representative for Louisiana's 4th congressional district since 2017; Speaker of the United States House of Representatives since 2023; former state representative and constitutional attorney from Bossier Parish
- Quinn Johnson (born 1986), fullback for the Green Bay Packers
- Toya Johnson (born 1983), actress
- John Bennett Johnston Jr. (born 1932), U.S. senator (1972–97); lobbyist (since 1997); state senator (1968–72); state representative (1964–68)
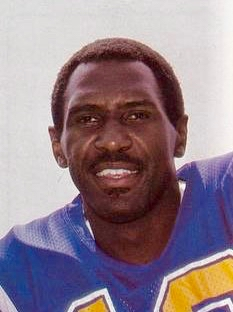
- Charlie Joiner
  Charlie Joiner (born 1947), former NFL wide receiver, member of the Pro Football Hall of Fame
- Bert Jones (born 1951), football quarterback, LSU and NFL's Baltimore Colts
- Chad Jones (born 1988), safety for the New York Giants
- Deion Jones (born 1994), linebacker for the Atlanta Falcons
- Donnie Jones (born 1980), punter for the Philadelphia Eagles
- Dub Jones (1924–2024), NFL and AAFC running back
- Edgar Jones (born 1984), linebacker for the Kansas City Chiefs
- Jacoby Jones (born 1984), wide receiver for the Baltimore Ravens
- Perry Jones III (born 1991), player for the Oklahoma City Thunder
- Ralph Waldo Emerson Jones (1905–1982), president and baseball coach at Grambling State University (1936–77)
- Henderson Jordan (1896–1958), Bienville Parish sheriff, in posse that ambushed Bonnie and Clyde
- Michael I. Jordan (born 1956), professor at University of California, Berkeley, researcher in machine learning and artificial intelligence
- J. E. Jumonville Jr. (born 1942), state senator and horse breeder from Pointe Coupee Parish
- Juvenile (born 1975), rapper

== K ==
- Kelly Keeling (born 1966), singer-songwriter from Houma
- Perry Keith (1847–1935), politician
- William P. Kellogg (1830–1918), member of Congress; governor; United States senator
- Iris Kelso (1926–2003), New Orleans journalist
- Bolivar E. Kemp (1871–1933), U.S. representative (1925–33)
- Bolivar Edwards Kemp Jr. (1904–1965), Louisiana attorney general (1948–52)
- John Neely Kennedy (born 1951), Louisiana state treasurer
- Robert F. Kennon (1902–1988), governor of Louisiana (1952–56)
- Doug Kershaw (born 1936), musician, singer
- Sammy Kershaw (born 1958), musician; singer; candidate for Lieutenant Governor of Louisiana
- Ernie K-Doe (1936–2001), singer; billed himself as the "Emperor of the Universe"
- DJ Khaled (born 1975), record producer; radio personality; DJ; record label executive
- Salman Khan (born 1976), founder and CEO of Khan Academy
- Nat G. Kiefer (1939–1985), state senator from New Orleans
- Catherine D. Kimball (born 1945), retired chief justice of the Louisiana Supreme Court
- Claude King (1923–2013), country singer-songwriter; known for "Wolverton Mountain"
- Earl King (1934–2003), musician
- Ralph E. King (1902–1974), physician; state senator from Franklin Parish
- Edith Killgore Kirkpatrick (1918–2014), music educator; former member of Louisiana Board of Regents
- Mark Klein (born 1993), singer
- Neil Haven Klock (1896–1978), sugar planter; politician from Rapides Parish
- Jeannette Knoll (born 1943), associate justice of the Louisiana Supreme Court
- Jesse Monroe Knowles (1919–2006), politician; survivor of the Bataan Death March during World War II

== L ==
- John LaBruzzo (born 1970), politician
- Eddie Lacy (born 1990), running back for the Green Bay Packers
- Oliver Lafayette (born 1984), basketball player
- Ed Lafitte (1886–1971), baseball player
- Jean Lafitte (c. 1780 – c. 1826), blacksmith; pirate
- David LaFleur (born 1974), former NFL player
- Eric LaFleur (born 1964), attorney and politician
- Greg LaFleur (born 1958), former NFL player
- Joseph Verbis Lafleur (1912–1944), Roman Catholic priest of the Military Ordinariate of the United States during World War II
- Vanessa Caston LaFleur, attorney and politician
- Juan LaFonta (born 1972), former state representative for Orleans Parish and New Orleans lawyer
- Papa Jack Laine (1873–1966), bandleader
- Maxie Lambright (1924–1980), football coach
- Dorothy Lamour (1914–1996), actress
- Julius Lamperez (1920–1999), musician
- Katherine LaNasa (born 1966), actress, Judging Amy
- Bennett Landreneau (born 1947), major general in the Army National Guard, and adjutant general of Louisiana, 1997–2011
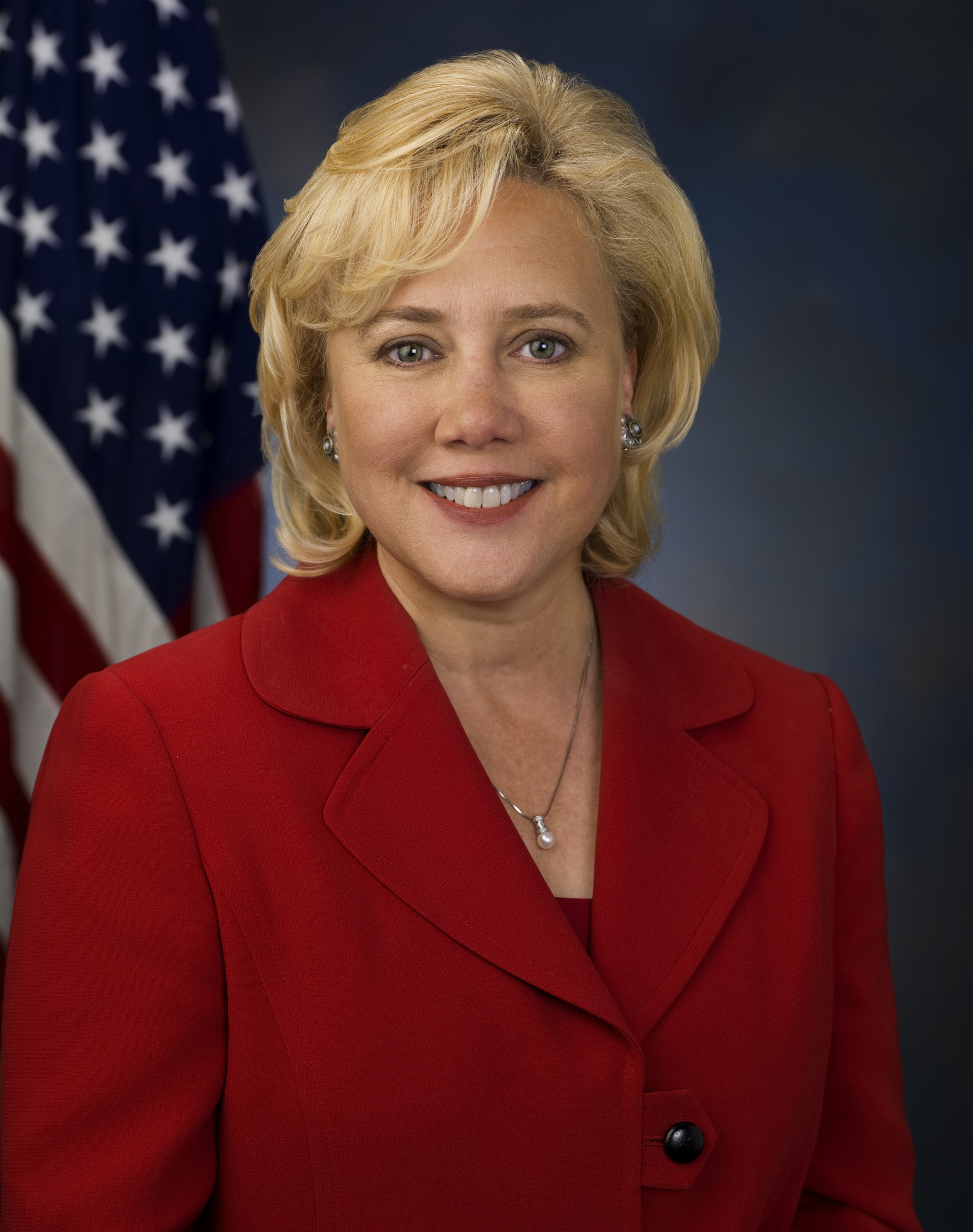
- Mary Landrieu
  Mary Landrieu (born 1955), US senator
- Mitch Landrieu (born 1960), politician
- Moon Landrieu (born 1930), judge, politician
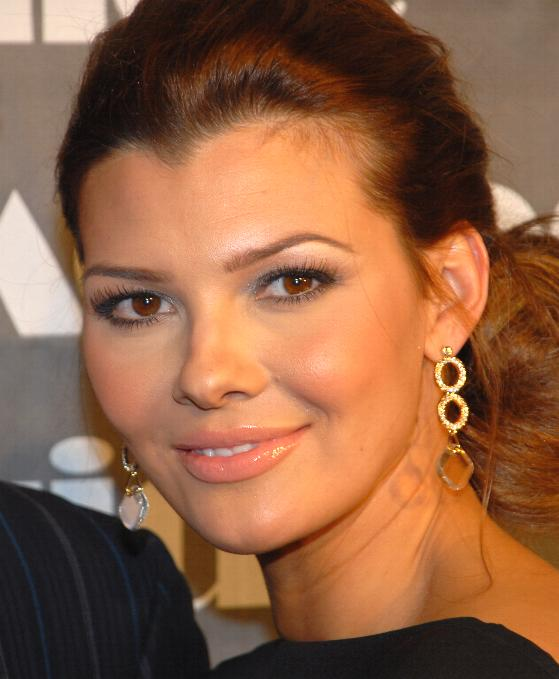
- Ali Landry
  Ali Landry (born 1973), actress; model; Miss USA (1996)
- Jarvis Landry (born 1992), wide receiver for the Miami Dolphins
- Jeff Landry (born 1970), politician
- Lisa Landry (born 1977), comedian
- Nancy Landry (born 1962), politician
- Eric Laneuville (born 1952), actor; television director, St. Elsewhere, Room 222
- Nick LaRocca (1889–1961), self-proclaimed "inventor of jazz"
- John Larroquette (born 1947), actor
- Hank Lauricella (1930–2014), football player; state senator
- Marie Laveau (c 1794 – c. 1881), Voodoo priestess
- Theodore K. Lawless (1892–1971), dermatologist, medical researcher, and philanthropist
- Ladislas Lazaro (1872–1927), politician
- Claude "Buddy" Leach (born 1934), politician; businessman
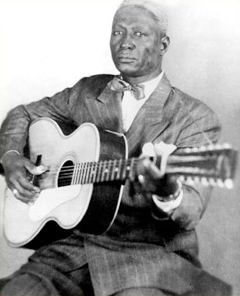
- Lead Belly
  Lead Belly (1885–1949), musician
- Ronald Leary (born 1989), guard for the Dallas Cowboys
- Dudley J. LeBlanc (1894–1971), politician; businessman; made a fortune in the patent medicine Hadacol
- Fred S. LeBlanc (1897–1969), politician
- Samuel A. LeBlanc I (1886–1955), lawyer; state representative; state court judge; grandfather of Sam A. LeBlanc III
- Conway LeBleu (1918–2007), state representative for Calcasieu and Cameron parishes, 1964–88
- Richard Leche (1898–1965), governor of Louisiana
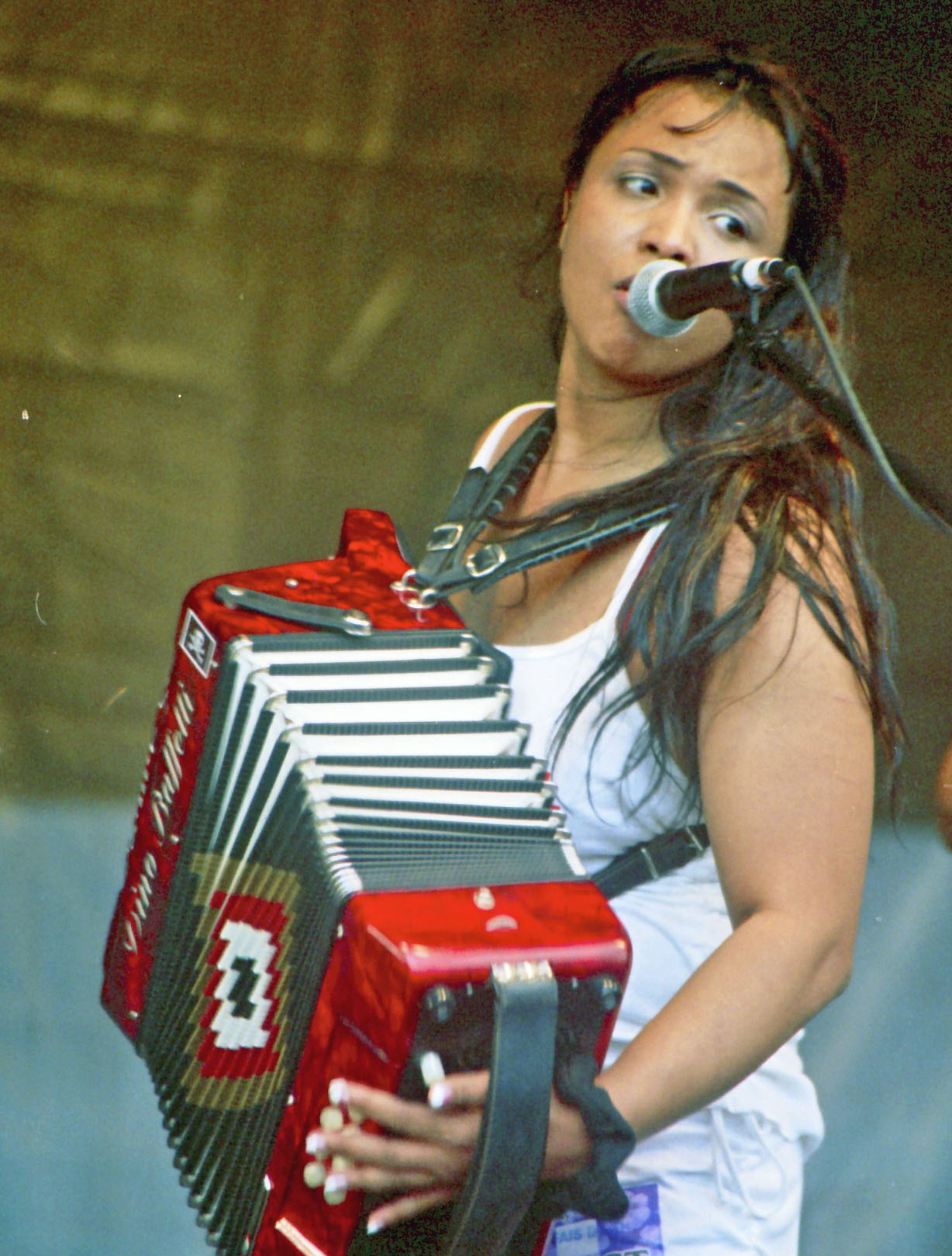
- Rosie Ledet
  Rosie Ledet (born 1971), musician
- Joseph E. LeDoux (born 1949), neuroscientist
- David Lee (born 1943), football player
- Harry Lee (1932–2007), Jefferson Parish sheriff
- Rory Lee (born 1949), president of Louisiana College (1997–2004)
- Keith Lehr (born 1963), two-time World Series of Poker bracelet winner, born and resides in Bossier City
- Iry LeJeune (1928–1955), musician
- John A. Lejeune (1867–1942), Marine Corps general
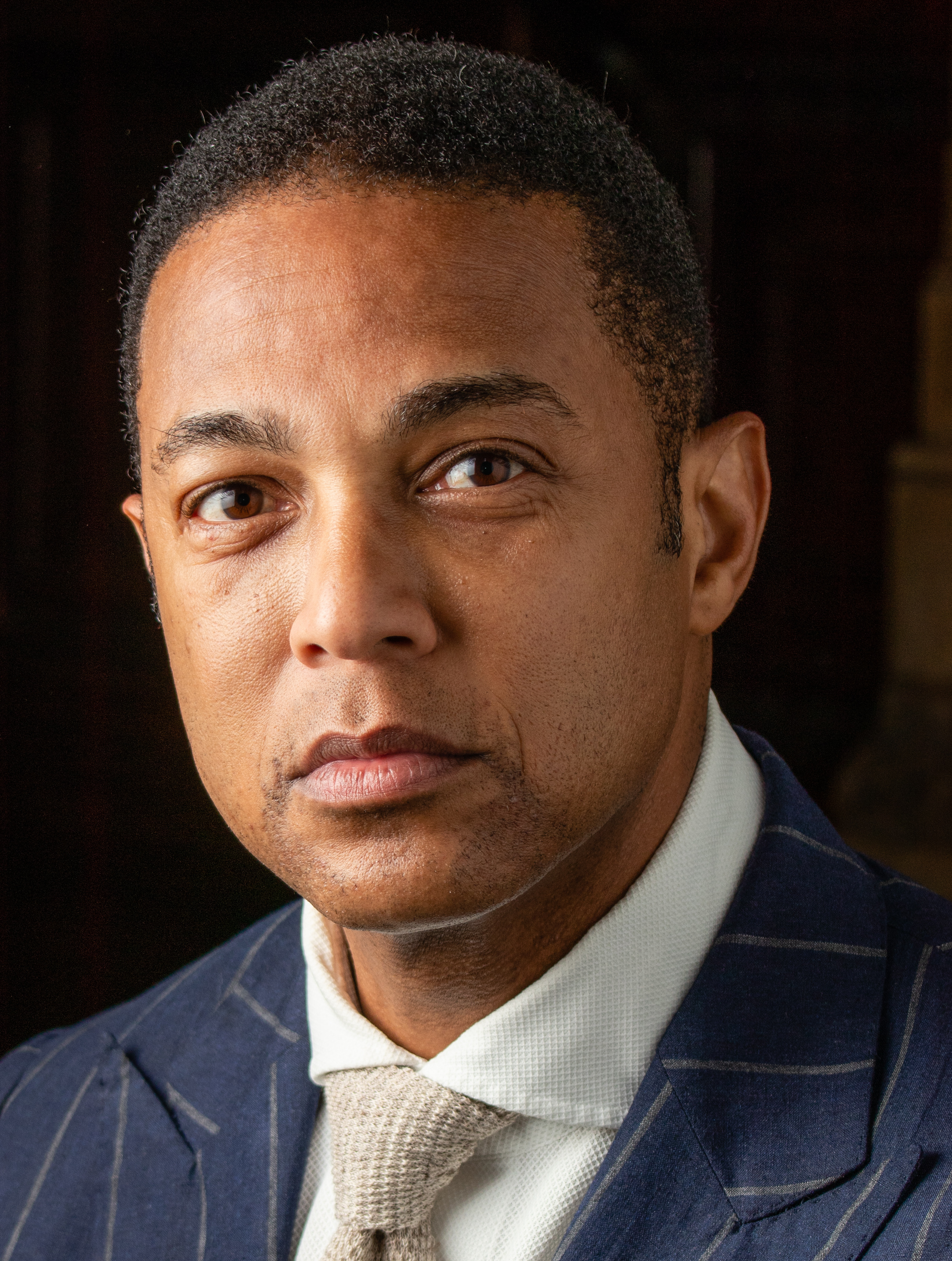
- Don Lemon
  Don Lemon (born 1966), journalist and television anchor; host of CNN Newsroom
- Elmore Leonard (1925–2013), crime and western novelist; born in New Orleans
- Jim Leslie (1937–1976), journalist; advertising executive; assassinated in Baton Rouge
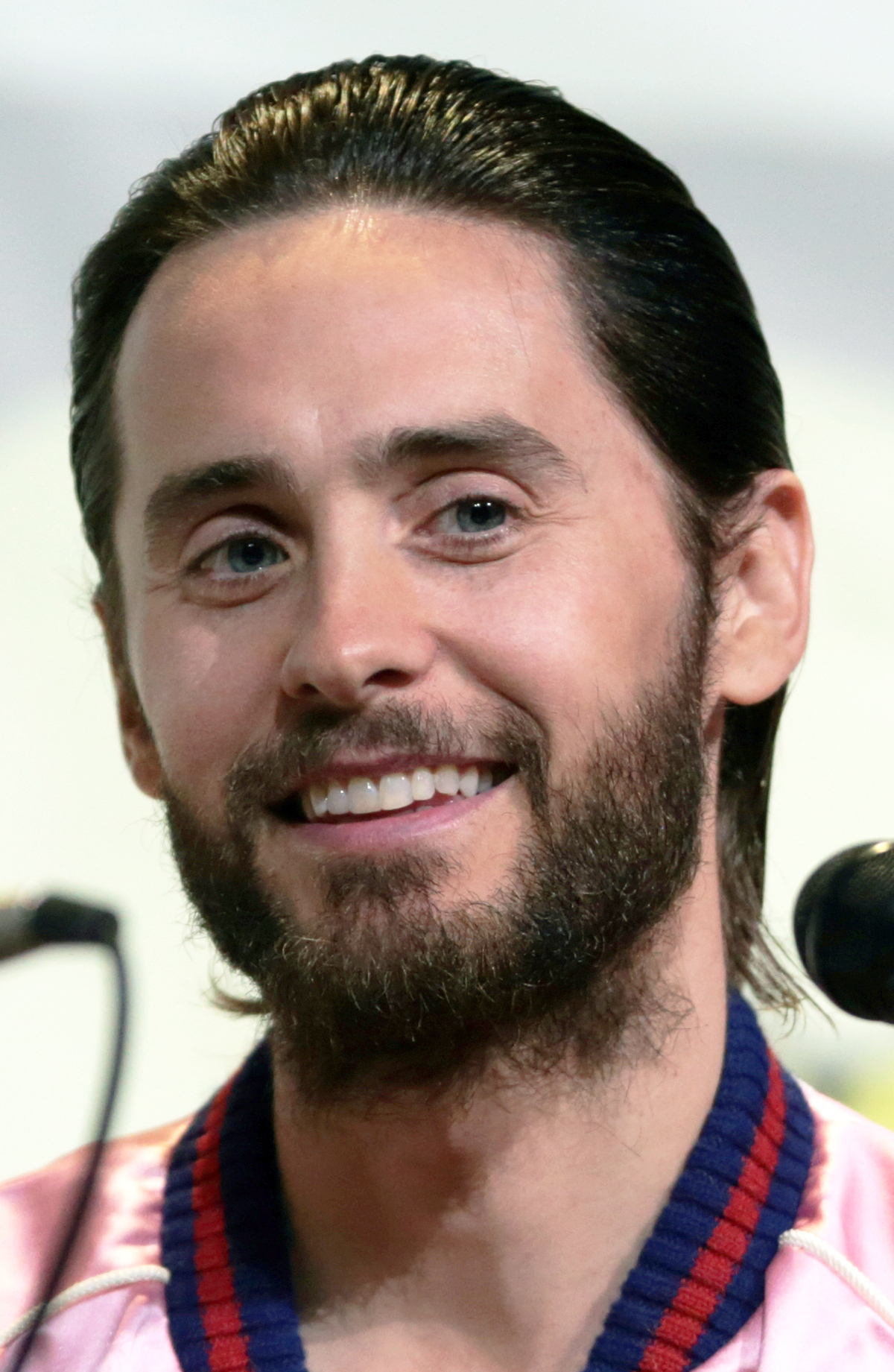
- Jared Leto
  Jared Leto (born 1971), actor; lead singer and guitarist of the alternative rock band Thirty Seconds to Mars
- Shannon Leto (born 1970), drummer of the alternative rock band Thirty Seconds to Mars, occasional actor
- Zachary Levi (born 1980), actor, Less than Perfect, Chuck
- Jerry Lee Lewis (1935–2022), musician
- Keenan Lewis (born 1986), cornerback for the New Orleans Saints
- Michael Lewis (born 1960), author; financial journalist; Moneyball, The Blind Side
- Patrick Lewis (born 1991), center for the Seattle Seahawks
- Rashard Lewis (born 1979), forward for the Orlando Magic
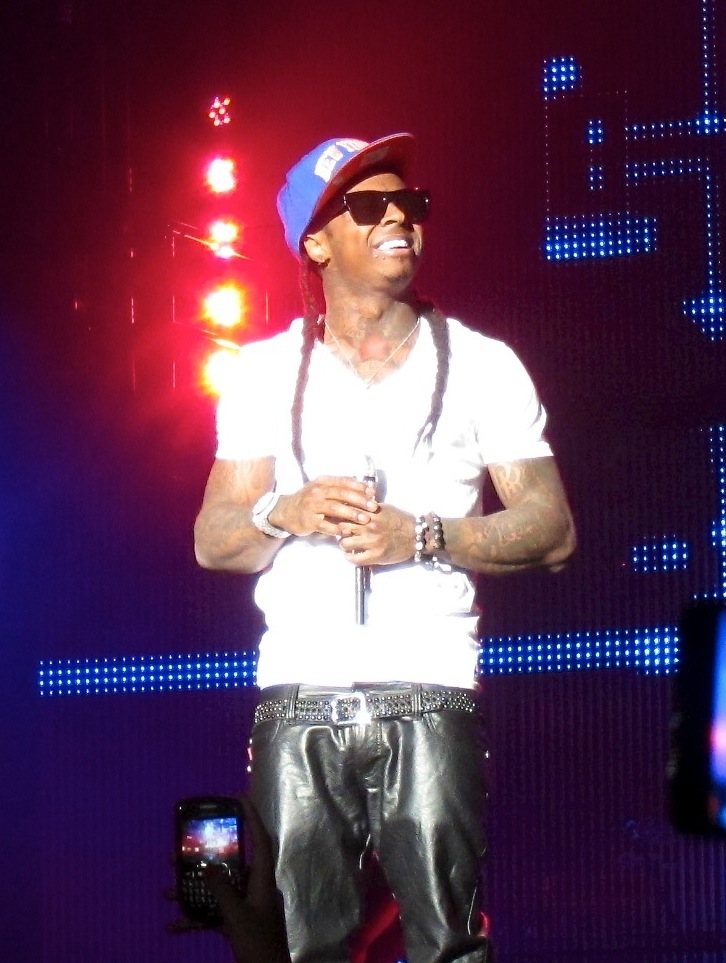
- Lil Wayne
  Lil Wayne (born Dwayne Michael Carter Jr.), rapper
- Coleman Lindsey (1892–1968), politician
- Meghan Linsey (born 1985), musician, singer/songwriter, and contestant on The Voice season 8
- F. A. Little Jr. (born 1936), judge of the United States District Court for the Western District of Louisiana
- Little Walter (1930–1968), blues harmonica player
- Nate Livings (born 1982), guard for the Dallas Cowboys
- Bob Livingston (born 1943), member of Congress (1977–99)
- Edward Livingston (1764–1836), member of Congress; United States Secretary of State
- Lloyd (born 1986), contemporary R&B and hip hop artist
- Bennie Logan (born 1989), nose tackle for the Philadelphia Eagles
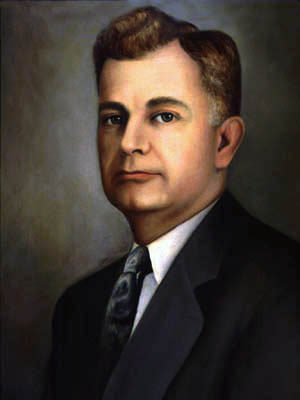
- Earl Long
  Earl Kemp Long (1895–1960), governor of Louisiana (1939–40, 1948–52 and 1956–60)
- George S. Long (1883–1958), US representative
- Gerald Long (born 1944), Republican state senator from Natchitoches; only elected Republican official of the Long family
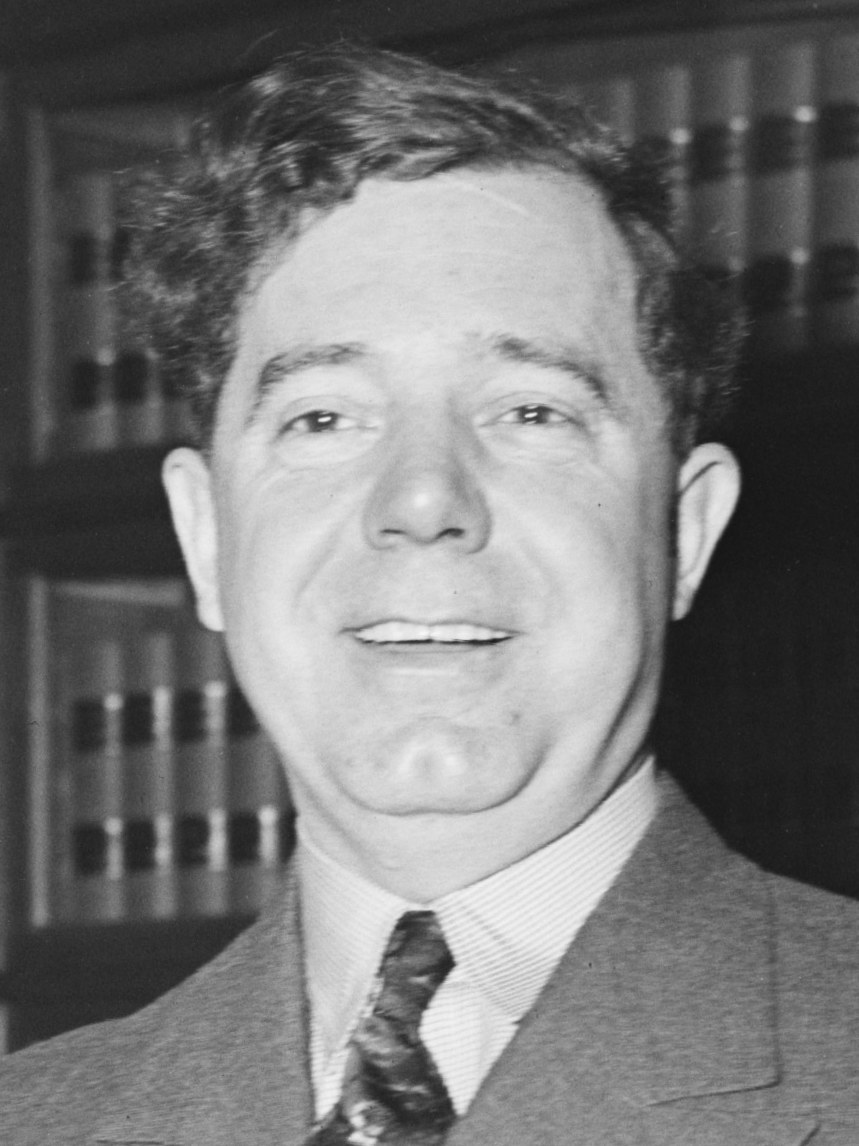
- Huey Long
  Huey Pierce Long Jr. (1893–1935), governor of Louisiana; US senator
- Jimmy D. Long (1931–2016), politician
- Russell Long (1918–2003), US senator
- Speedy O. Long (1928–2006), US representative; district attorney from La Salle Parish
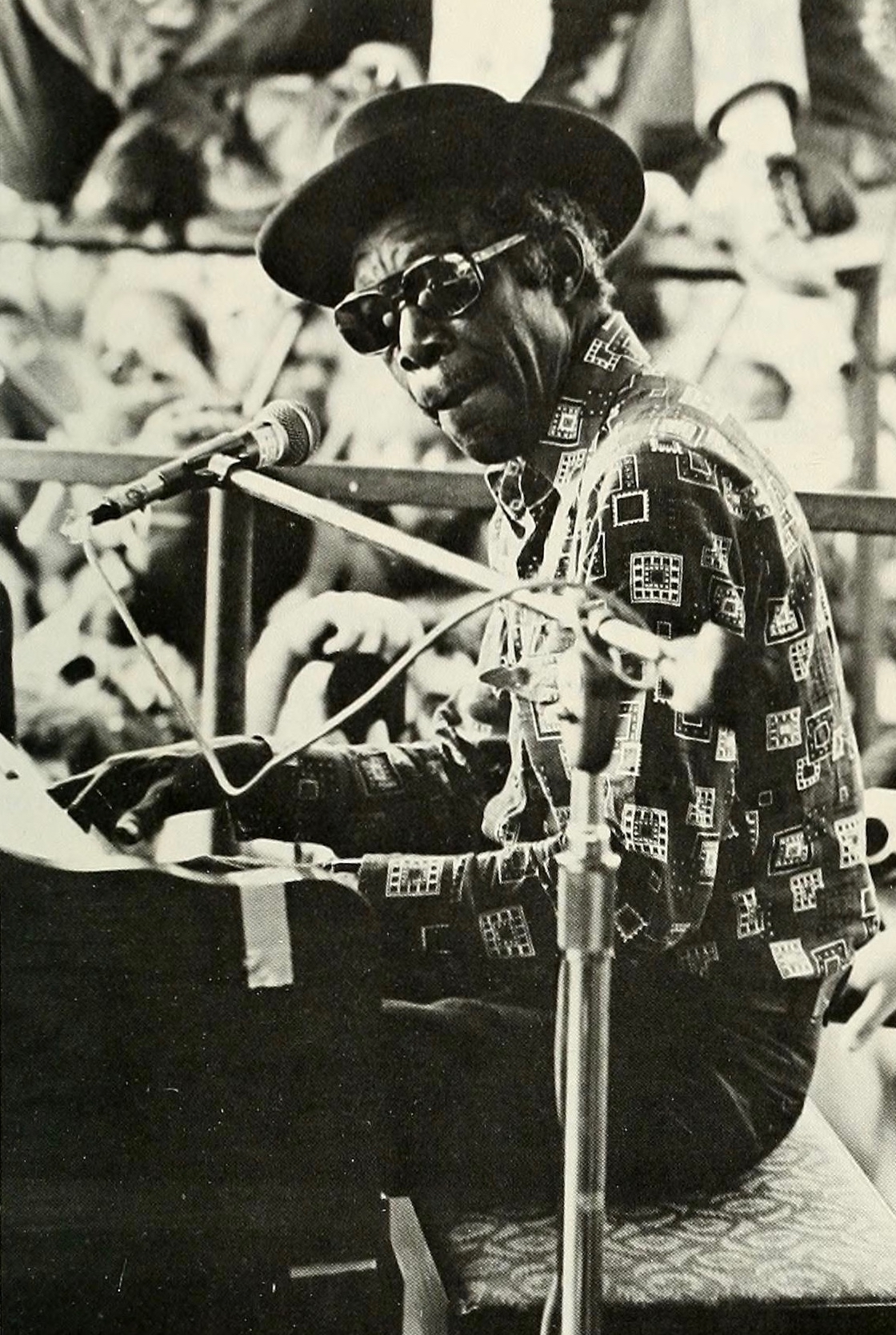
- Professor Longhair
  Professor Longhair (1918–1980), musician
- John L. Loos (1918–2011), historian
- Joseph Lopinto (born c. 1976), state representative from Jefferson Parish
- Morris Lottinger Jr. (born c. 1938), politician
- Morris Lottinger Sr. (1902–1978), politician
- Lance Louis (born 1985), offensive guard for the Indianapolis Colts
- Aaron Loup (born 1987), relief pitcher for the Toronto Blue Jays
- Bobby Lowther (1923–2015), only two-sport (basketball and track and field) All-American at Louisiana State University (1946)
- Cornelius Lucas (born 1991), offensive tackle for the Detroit Lions
- Robert L. Lynn (1931–2020), president of Louisiana College 1975–1997
- Ted Lyons (1900–1986), Hall of Fame baseball player

== M ==
- Sherman Q. Mack (born 1972), politician
- Anthony Mackie (born 1979), actor, Million Dollar Baby, The Hurt Locker, Captain America
- Magic Sam (1937–1969), blues music pioneer
- John Maginnis (1948–2014), journalist; author
- Mikie Mahtook (born 1989), outfielder for the Tampa Bay Rays
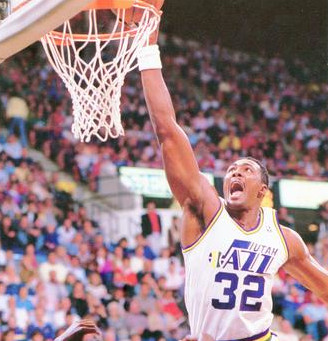
- Karl Malone
  Karl Malone (born 1963), Hall of Fame basketball player, mainly with the Utah Jazz
- Jeff Mangum (born 1970), musician; founder of Neutral Milk Hotel
- Archie Manning (born 1949), former New Orleans Saints quarterback; father of Eli, Cooper and Peyton
- Cooper Manning (born 1974), television personality; brother of Eli and Peyton
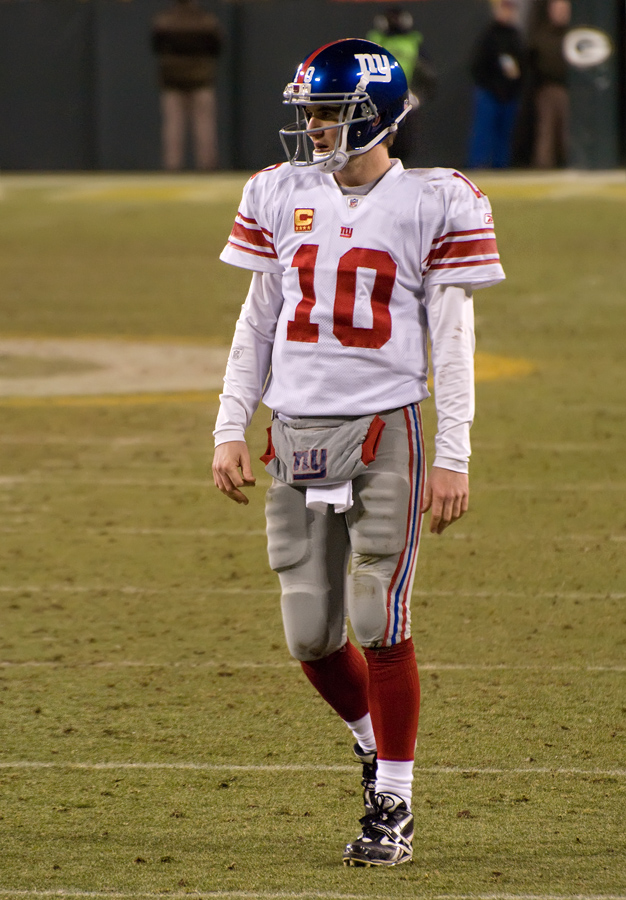
- Eli Manning
  Eli Manning (born 1981), New York Giants quarterback; son of Archie Manning; brother of Peyton and Cooper
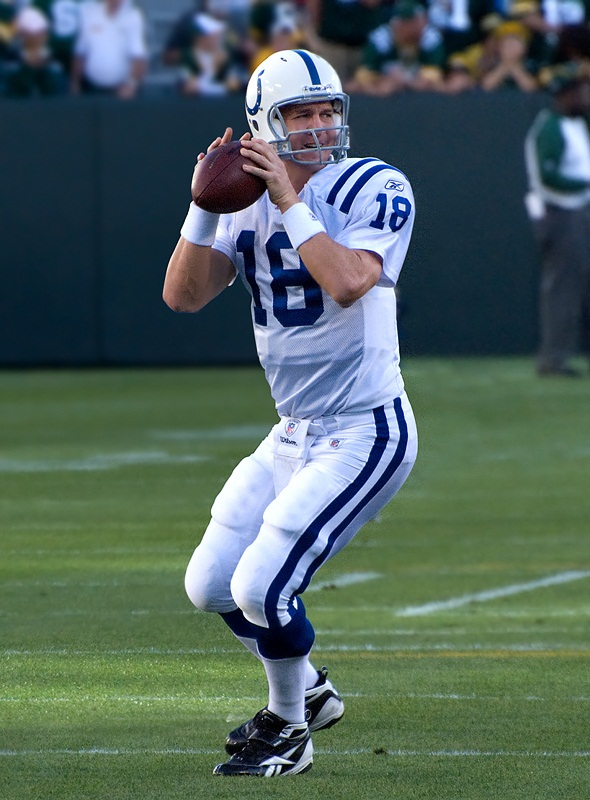
- Peyton Manning
  Peyton Manning (born 1976), retired Denver Broncos quarterback; son of Archie Manning; brother of Eli and Cooper
- Tommy Manzella (born 1983), shortstop for the Colorado Rockies
- "Pistol" Pete Maravich (1947–1988), basketball player, LSU and NBA Hall of Famer
- Paul Mares (1900–1949), musician
- Anna Margaret (born 1996), singer
- Angélica María (born 1944), Mexican actress and singer
- Robert M. Marionneaux (born 1968), politician
- Branford Marsalis (born 1960), musician
- Delfeayo Marsalis (born 1965), trombonist
- Ellis Marsalis Jr. (1934–2020), musician; educator
- Ellis Marsalis Sr. (1908–2004), poultry farmer; jazz musician; hotelier; civil rights activist
- Jason Marsalis (born 1977), percussionist
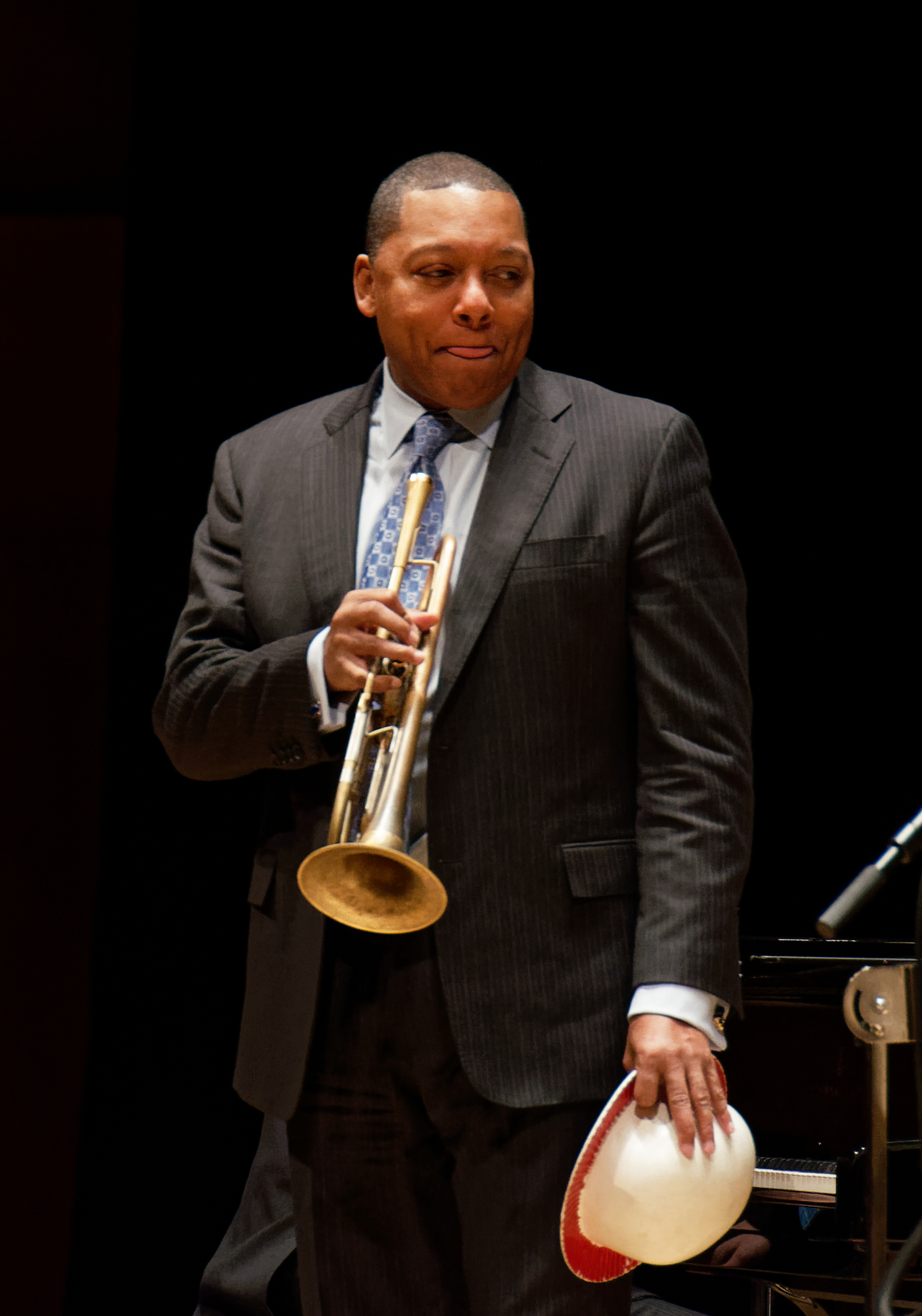
- Wynton Marsalis
  Wynton Marsalis (born 1961), musician
- Leonard Marshall (born 1961), former defensive end, primarily for the New York Giants
- Samuel W. Martien (1854–1946), planter; politician
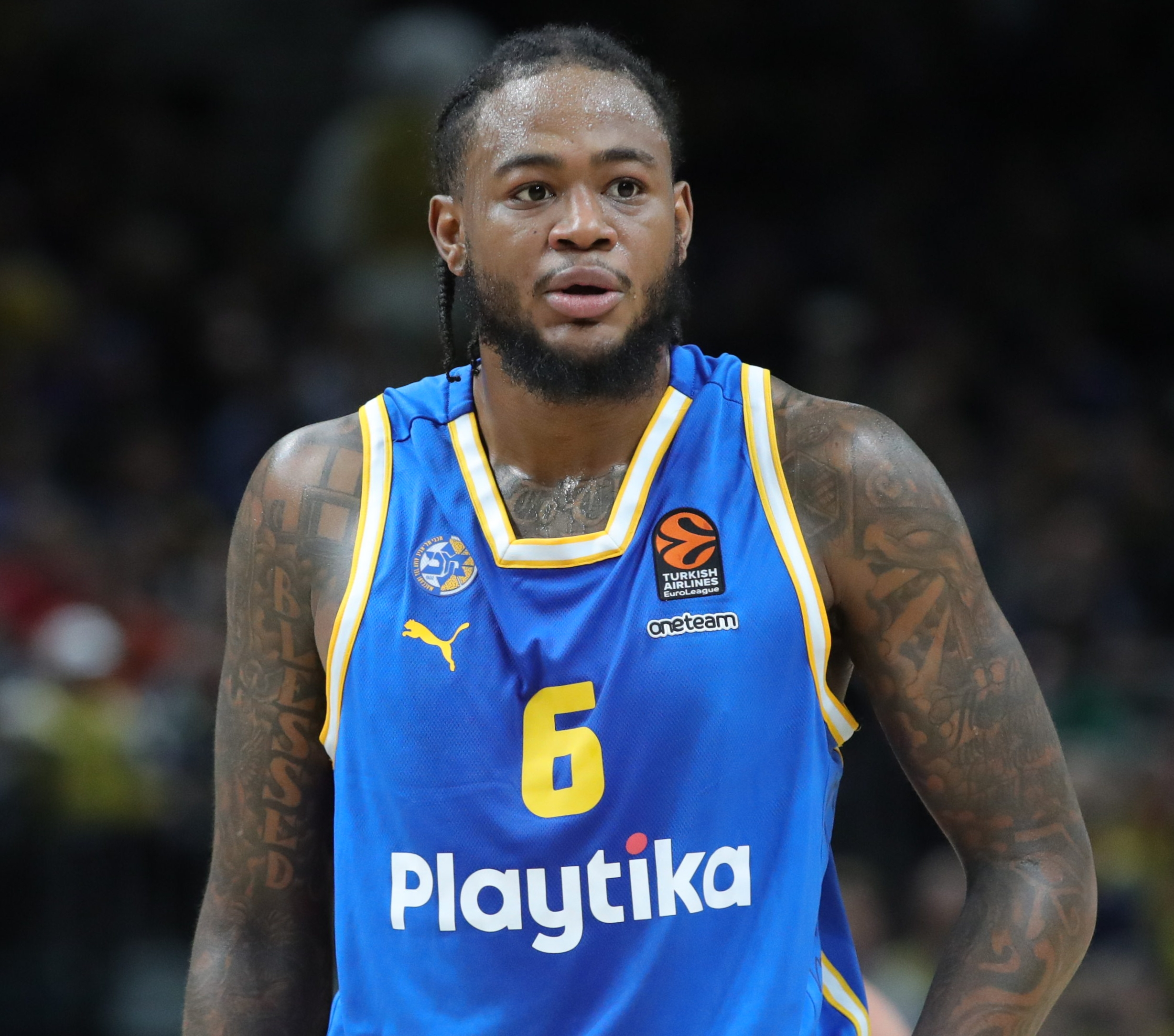
- Jarell Martin
  Jarell Martin (born 1994), basketball player for Maccabi Tel Aviv of the Israeli Basketball Premier League
- Danny Martiny (born 1951), politician
- Rod Masterson (1945–2013), actor
- Tyrann Mathieu (born 1992), free safety and cornerback for the Arizona Cardinals
- Vance McAllister (born 1974), U.S. representative from Louisiana's 5th congressional district
- Jay McCallum (born 1960), justice of the Louisiana Supreme Court; former state representative for Lincoln and Union parishes
- James T. McCalman (1914–1977), state senator from Claiborne and Bienville parishes (1960–64)
- Todd McClure (born 1977), center for the Atlanta Falcons
- John McConathy (1930–2016), professional basketball player and educator
- Mike McConathy (born 1955), basketball coach at Northwestern State University since 1999; son of John McConathy
- Billy McCormack (1928–2012), Southern Baptist clergyman; national director of the Christian Coalition of America
- Jim McCrery (born 1949), US representative
- Sidney McCrory (1911–1985), Louisiana Commissioner of Agriculture and Forestry (1956–60)
- Jack McFarland (born 1969), state representative from Winn Parish, effective 2016
- Eugene McGehee (1928–2014), state legislator; judge; from East Baton Rouge Parish
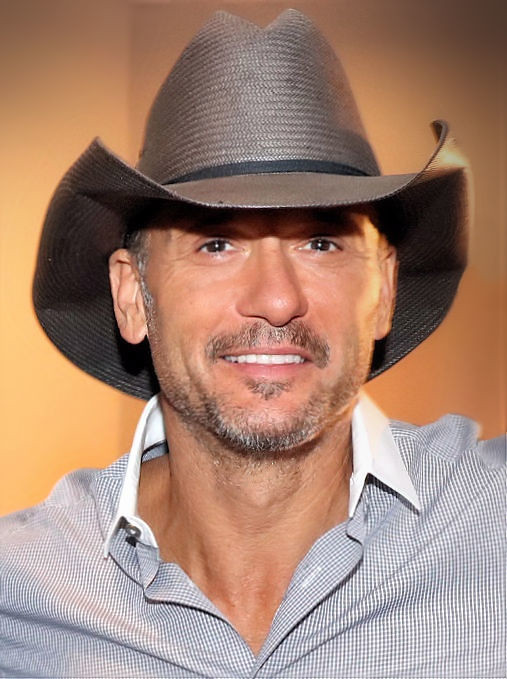
- Tim McGraw
  Tim McGraw (born 1967), country musician; actor
- John McKeithen (1918–1999), governor of Louisiana (1964–72)
- W. Fox McKeithen (1946–2005), Louisiana secretary of state (1988–2005)
- Charles E. McKenzie (1896–1956), U.S. representative
- Baylus Benjamin McKinney (1886–1952), Christian singer-songwriter
- Joe McKnight (born 1988), tailback for the New York Jets
- A. J. McNamara (1936–2014), state representative; U.S. district judge from Jefferson Parish
- Gil Meche (born 1978), MLB pitcher
- Leon C. Megginson (1921–2010), LSU professor noted for his clarifying statements about Darwinism
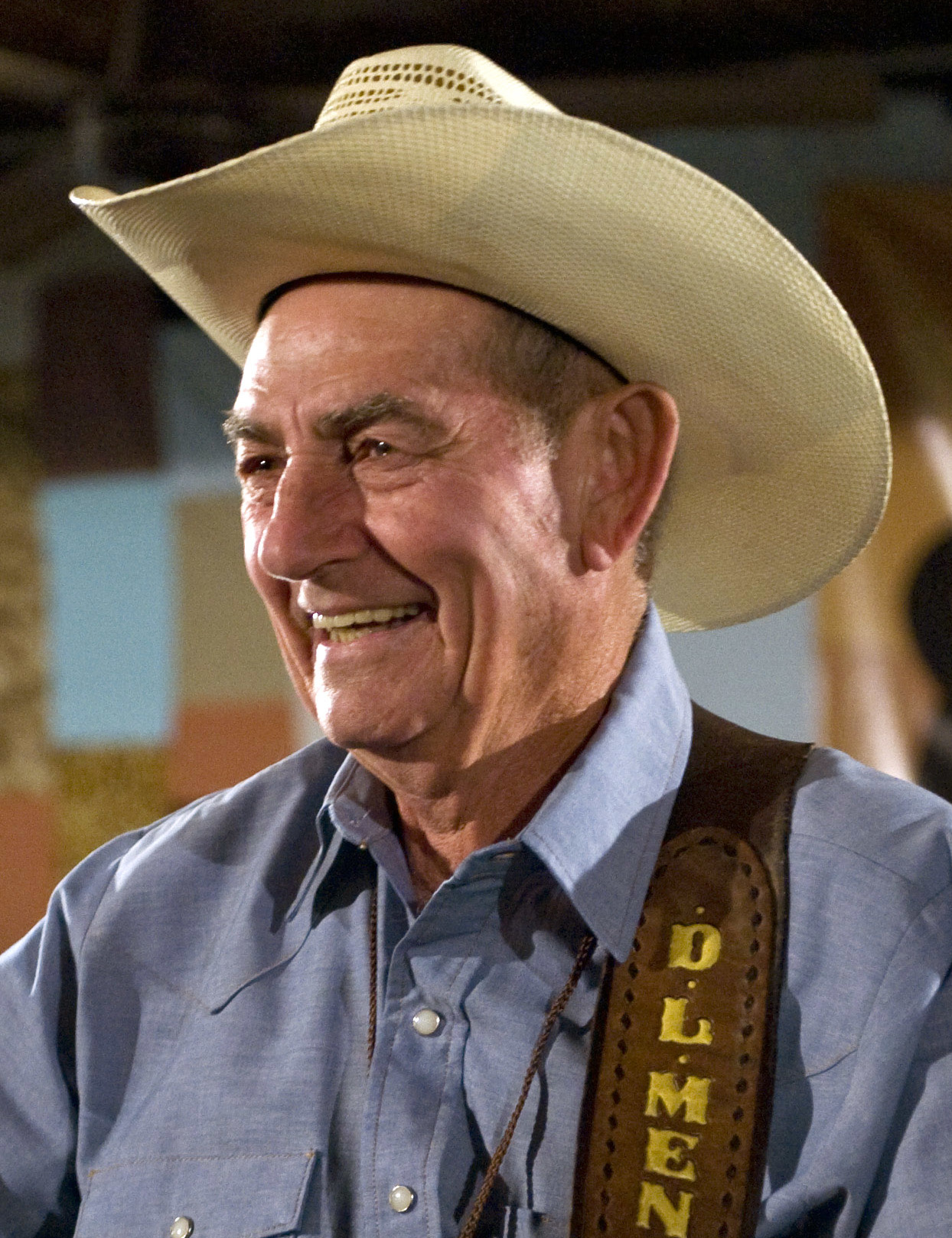
- D.L. Menard
  D. L. Menard (1932–2017), Cajun musician from Erath
- Adah Isaacs Menken (1835–1868), actress
- Emile Meyer (1910–1987), actor
- Jerome Meyinsse (born 1988), basketball player in the Israeli Basketball Premier League
- Quintin Mikell (born 1980), safety for the St. Louis Rams
- Lizzie Miles (1895–1963), singer
- Wade Miley (born 1986), relief pitcher for the Houston Astros
- Larry Miller (born 1936), musician and accordion maker
- Roderick Miller (1924–2005), politician; lawyer
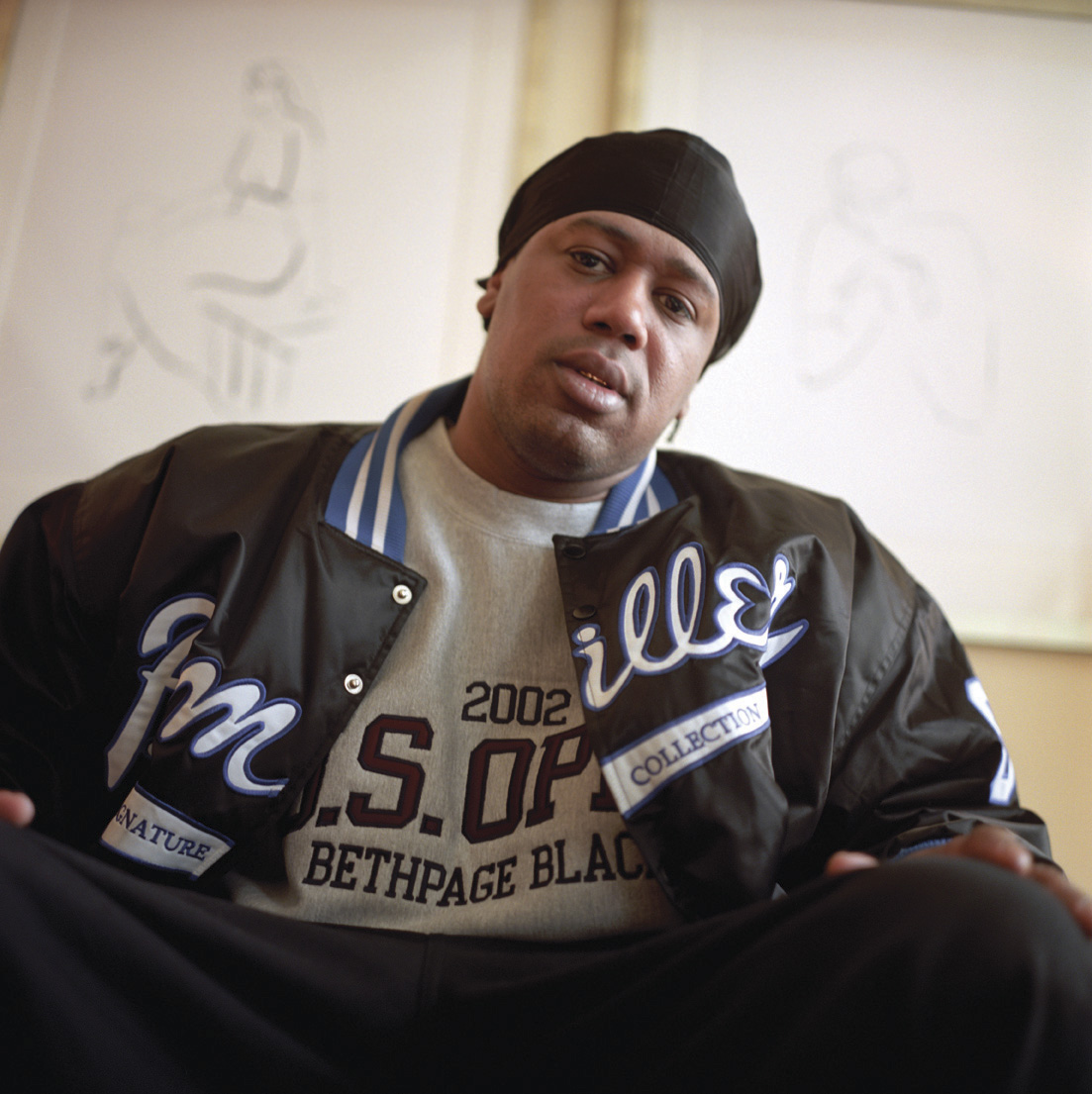
- Master P
  Percy "Master P" Miller (born 1967), musician; actor; record producer; athlete
- Fred H. Mills Jr. (born 1955), politician, pharmacist, banker
- Jordan Mills (born 1990), offensive tackle for the Chicago Bears
- Newt V. Mills (1899–1996), U.S. representative
- Paul Millsap (born 1985), power forward for the Utah Jazz
- Alexander Milne (1742–1838), businessman; slave trader; philanthropist
- Barkevious Mingo (born 1990), outside linebacker for the New England Patriots
- H. Lane Mitchell (1895–1978), Shreveport commissioner of public works (1934–68)
- RJ Mitte (1992–2026), actor, Walt Jr. on Breaking Bad
- Beth Mizell (born 1952), state senator for St. Tammany, Tangipahoa, and Washington parishes since 2016
- Randy Moffett (born 1947), educator
- Bill Monroe (1920–2011), journalist, host of Meet the Press (1975–84)
- Greg Monroe (born 1990), center for the Detroit Pistons
- Billy Montgomery (born 1937), politician; former educator
- Little Brother Montgomery (c. 1906–1985), musician
- Chris Mooney (born 1977), journalist and author
- Cleo Moore (1923–1973), actress (1950s)
- Danny Roy Moore (1925–c. 2020), state senator from Claiborne Parish (1964–68)
- Ellen Bryan Moore (1912–1999), register of state lands; captain in Women's Army Corps during World War II
- Mewelde Moore (born 1982), running back for the Indianapolis Colts
- W. Henson Moore (born 1939), US representative
- Jackie Moreland (1938–1971), professional basketball player
- Aaron Morgan (born 1988), outside linebacker and defensive end for the Tampa Bay Buccaneers
- Cecil Morgan (1898–1999), state legislator; led the impeachment forces against Huey Pierce Long Jr.; executive with Standard Oil Company; dean of Tulane University Law School
- Elemore Morgan Jr. (1931–2008), landscape painter and photographer
- Lewis L. Morgan (1876–1950), U.S. representative; gubernatorial runoff candidate (1944)
- Oliver Morgan (1933–2007), R&B singer
- Dutch Morial (1929–1989), judge; mayor of New Orleans
- Sergio Rossetti Morosini (born 1953), diplomat, artist, author; 1975 honorary Louisiana state senator
- Cynthia Hedge-Morrell (born 1947), member of the New Orleans City Council
- Jean-Paul Morrell (born 1978), New Orleans lawyer and member of both houses of the Louisiana State Legislature
- Jay Morris (born 1958), state representative from Ouachita and Morehouse parishes
- deLesseps Morrison Jr. (1944–1996), state representative from Orleans Parish
- deLesseps S. "Chep" Morrison (1912–1964), mayor of New Orleans; ambassador to the Organization of American States; three-time gubernatorial candidate
- Logan Morrison (born 1987), outfielder and first baseman for the Seattle Mariners
- Morgus the Magnificent, fictional horror host (1950s–1980s)
- Paul Morphy (1837–1884), world chess champion
- Garrett Morris (born 1937), actor and comedian, Saturday Night Live
- Isaac Edward Morse (1809–1866), attorney general of Louisiana; US member of Congress
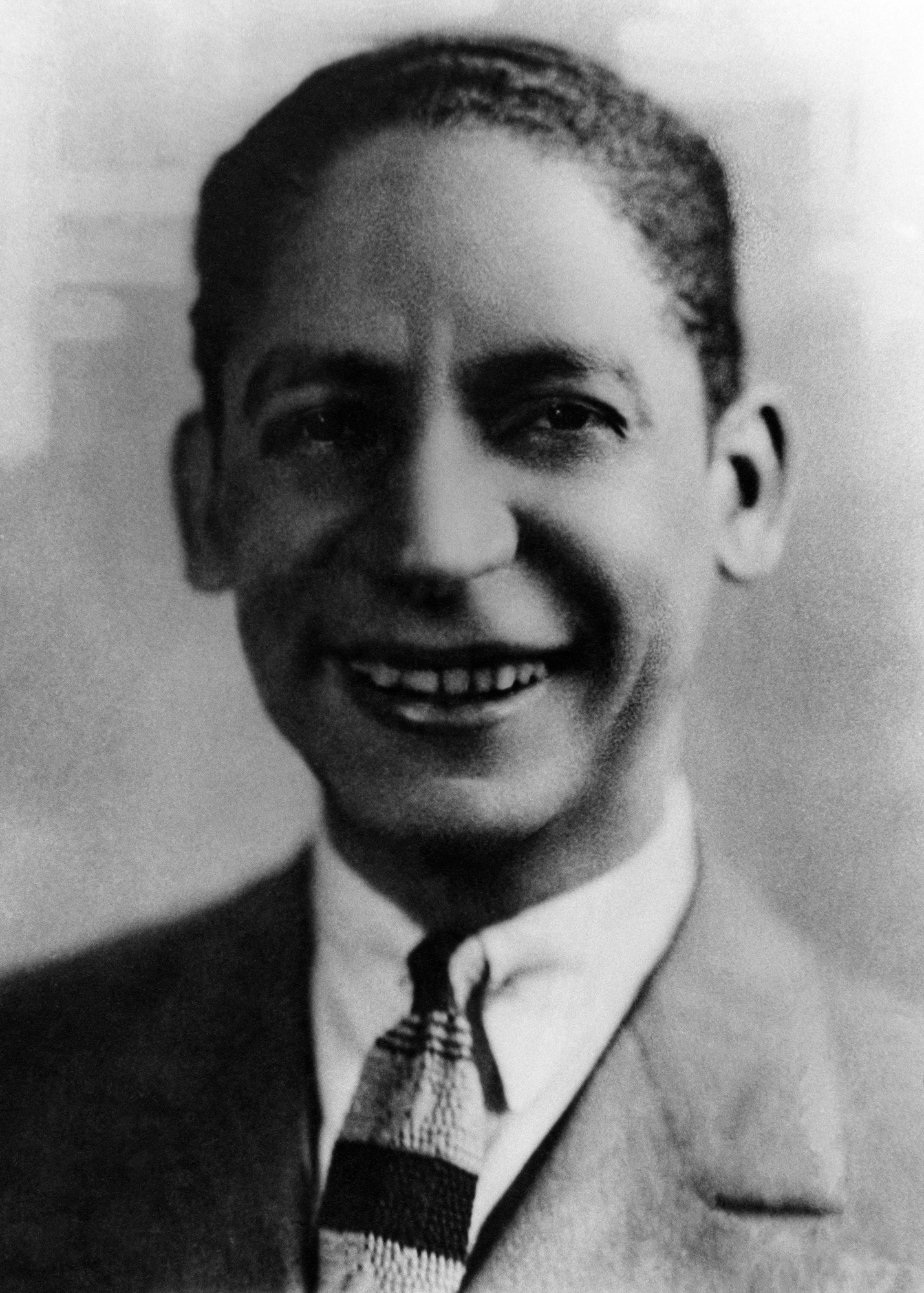
- Jelly Roll Morton
  Jelly Roll Morton (1890–1941), musician; composer; self-proclaimed "inventor of jazz"
- Alicia Morton (born 1987), actress
- Alexander Mouton (1804–1885), governor; United States senator
- Jonas Mouton (born 1988), linebacker for the San Diego Chargers
- Bernhard Müller (1788–1834), colonizer
- W. Spencer Myrick (1913–2001), state legislator from West Carroll Parish

== N ==
- Ray Nagin (born 1956), mayor of New Orleans during Hurricane Katrina; convicted felon
- Kevin Naquin, Cajun accordionist
- Oliver F. Naquin (1904–1989), United States Navy admiral
- Edward F. Neild (1884–1955), architect; from Shreveport
- Ed Nelson (1928–2014), actor, Peyton Place
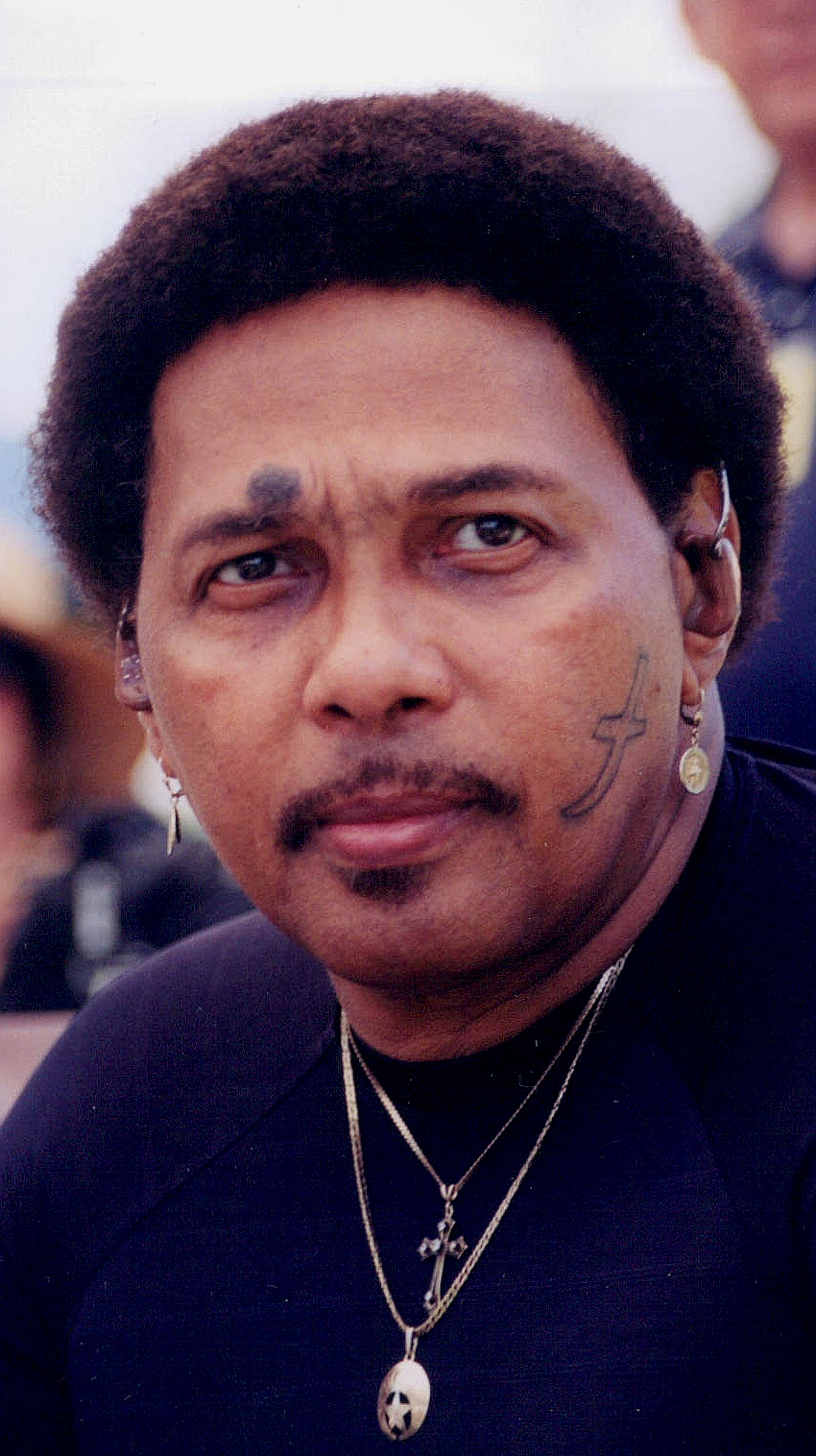
- Aaron Neville
  Aaron Neville (born 1941), singer
- Arthel Neville (born 1962), anchor for Fox News
- Drake Nevis (born 1989), defensive tackle for the Dallas Cowboys
- Josephine Louise Newcomb (1816–1901), philanthropist (Newcomb College)
- Jimmy C. Newman (1927–2014), musician
- Malik Newman (born 1997), basketball player in the Israeli Basketball Premier League
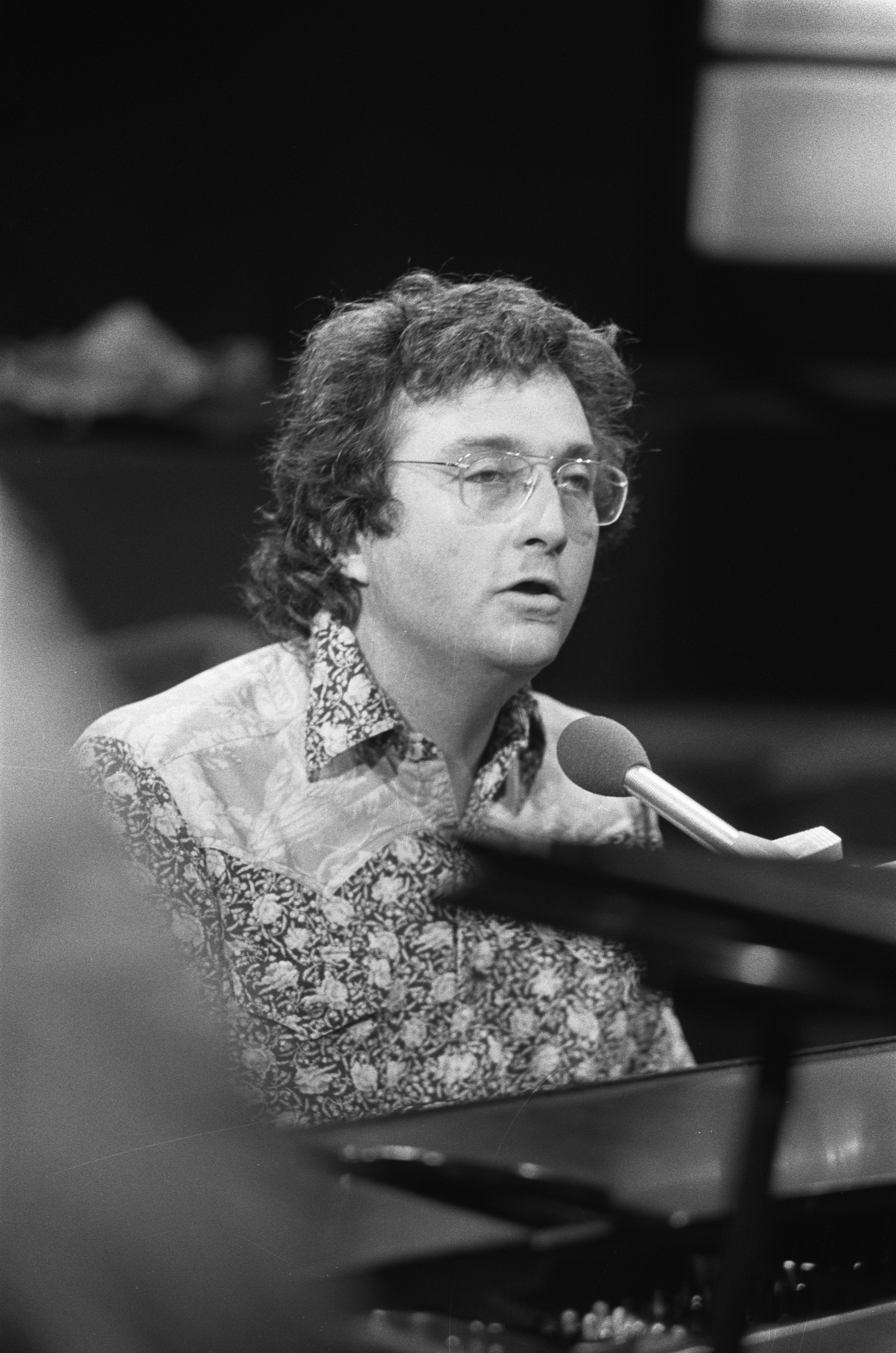
- Randy Newman
  Randy Newman (born 1943), singer-songwriter; pianist
- Francis T. Nicholls (1834–1912), governor of Louisiana
- Lance E. Nichols (born 1955), actor, Treme
- Taurean Nixon (born 1991), cornerback for the Denver Broncos
- James A. Noe (1890–1976), governor of Louisiana (for five months in 1936); oil driller; broadcaster
- Rico Noel (born 1989), outfielder for the New York Yankees
- Aaron Nola (born 1993), MLB All Star baseball pitcher
- William Wiley Norris III (1936–2016), city, district, and circuit court judge from West Monroe
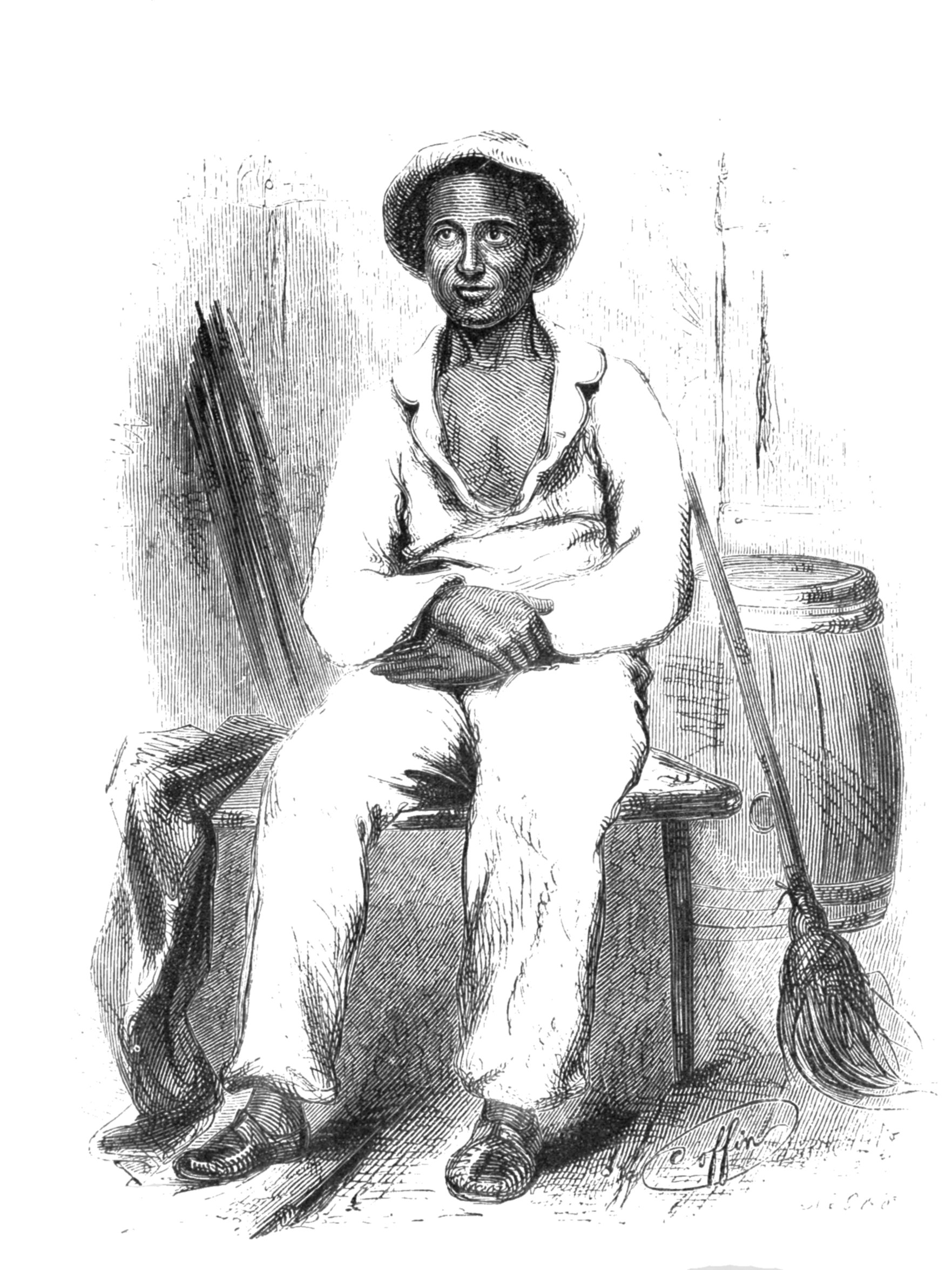
- Solomon Northup
  Solomon Northrup (1807–1863), abolitionist
- Alcide Nunez (1884–1934), musician
- Samuel B. Nunez Jr. (1930–2012), politician
- William Harold "Billy" Nungesser (born 1959), Republican politician

== O ==
- Prentiss Oakley (1905–1957), Bienville Parish sheriff (1940–52); in posse that ambushed Bonnie and Clyde in 1934
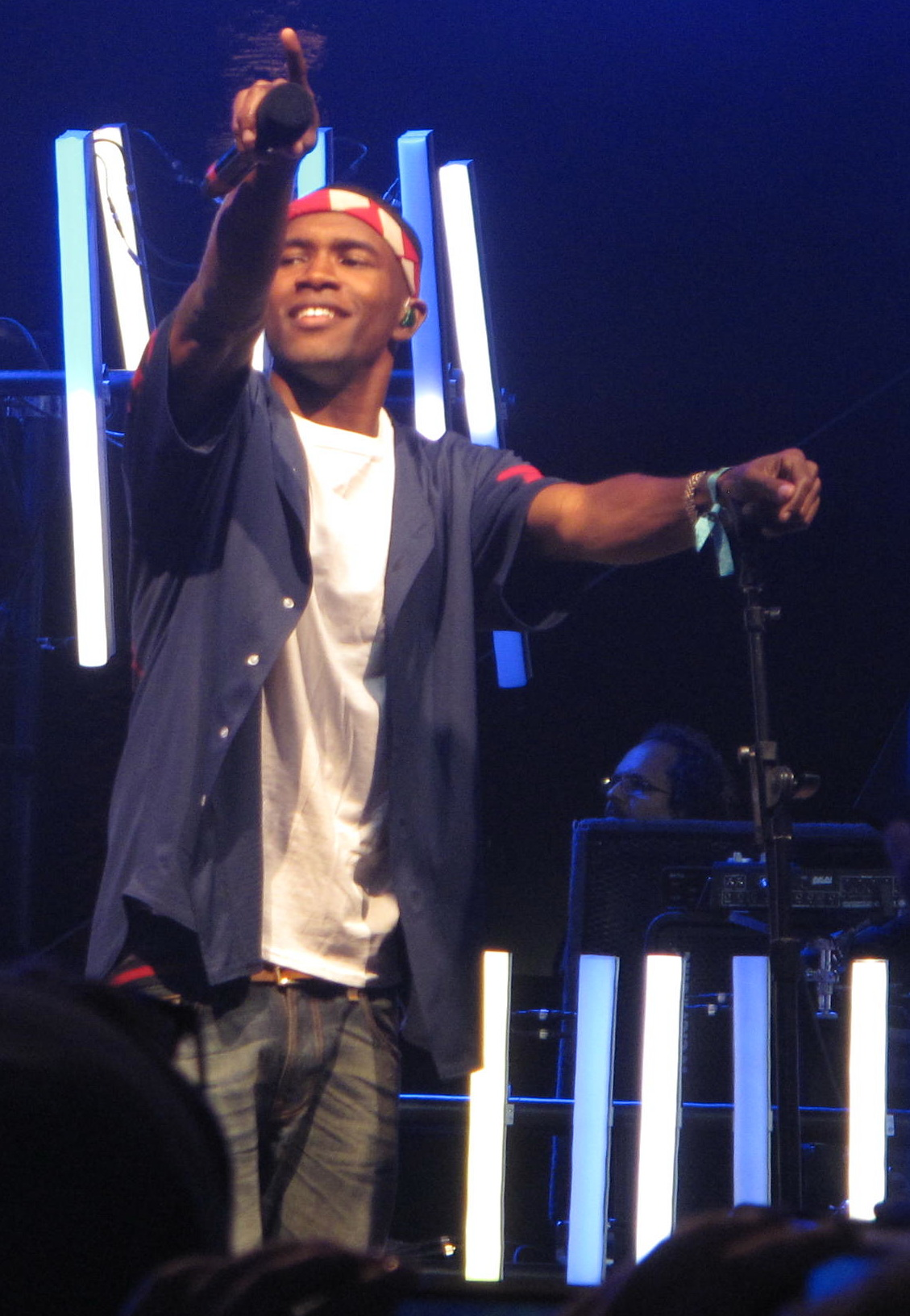
- Frank Ocean
  Frank Ocean (born 1987), Grammy Award-nominated R&B singer
- Alton Ochsner (1896–1981), surgeon; medical researcher
- Bob Odom (1935–2014), state agriculture commissioner (1980–2008); longest-serving individual in that office
- Arthur J. O'Keefe Sr. (1876–1943), mayor of New Orleans (1926–29)
- Michael H. O'Keefe (1931–2021), politician; convicted felon
- Henry Warren Ogden (1842–1905), politician
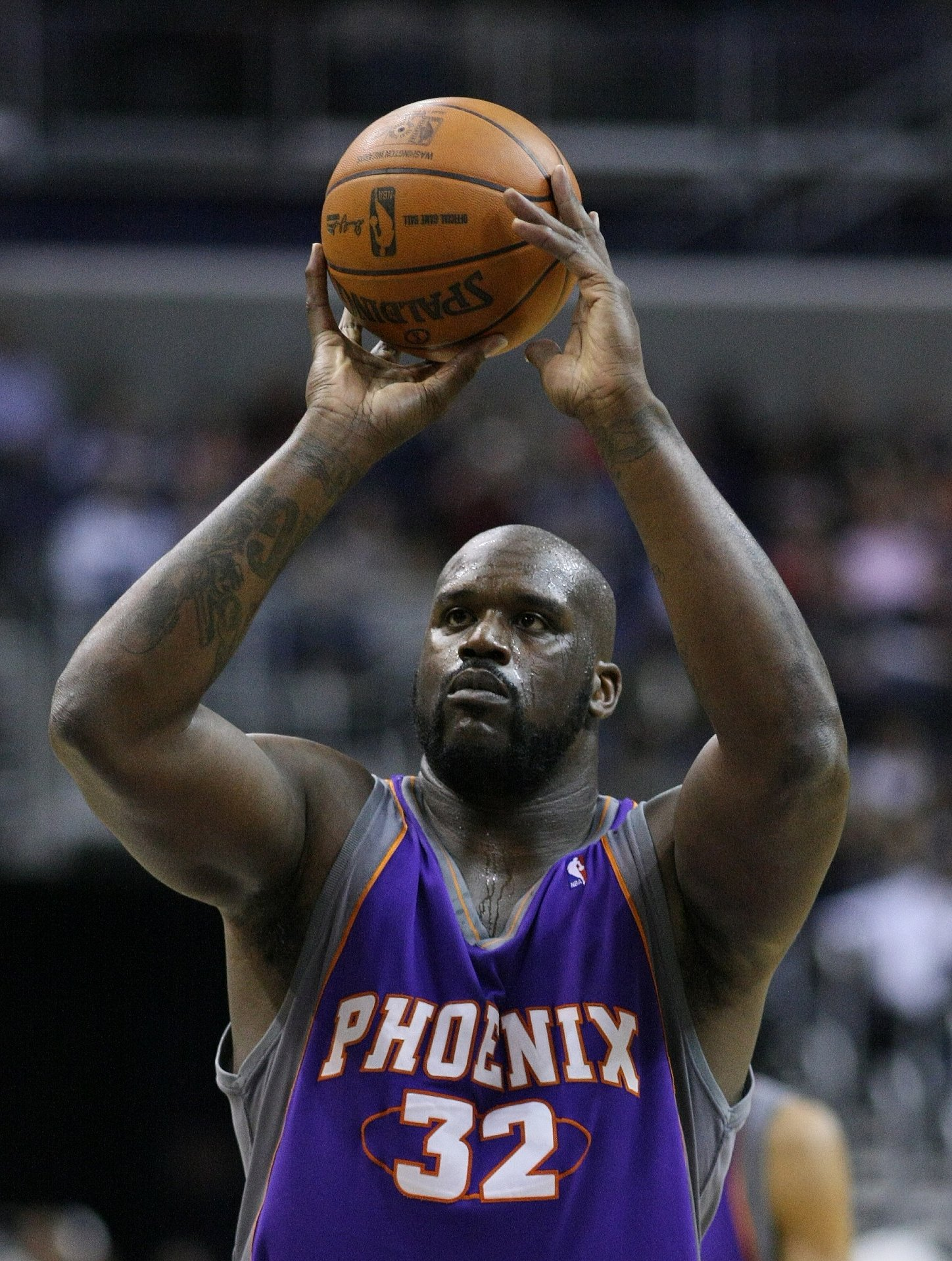
- Shaquille O'Neal
  Shaquille O'Neal (born 1972), former LSU and NBA player, Basketball Hall of Famer
- Joe "King" Oliver (1885–1938), jazz musician
- Virgil Orr (1923–2021), state representative; vice president, Louisiana Tech University
- Joe Osborn (1937–2018), musician
- Kenneth Osterberger (1930–2016), state senator from East Baton Rouge Parish, 1972–1992; former opponent of David Duke
- Lee Harvey Oswald (1939–1963), presumed assassin of U.S. President John F. Kennedy
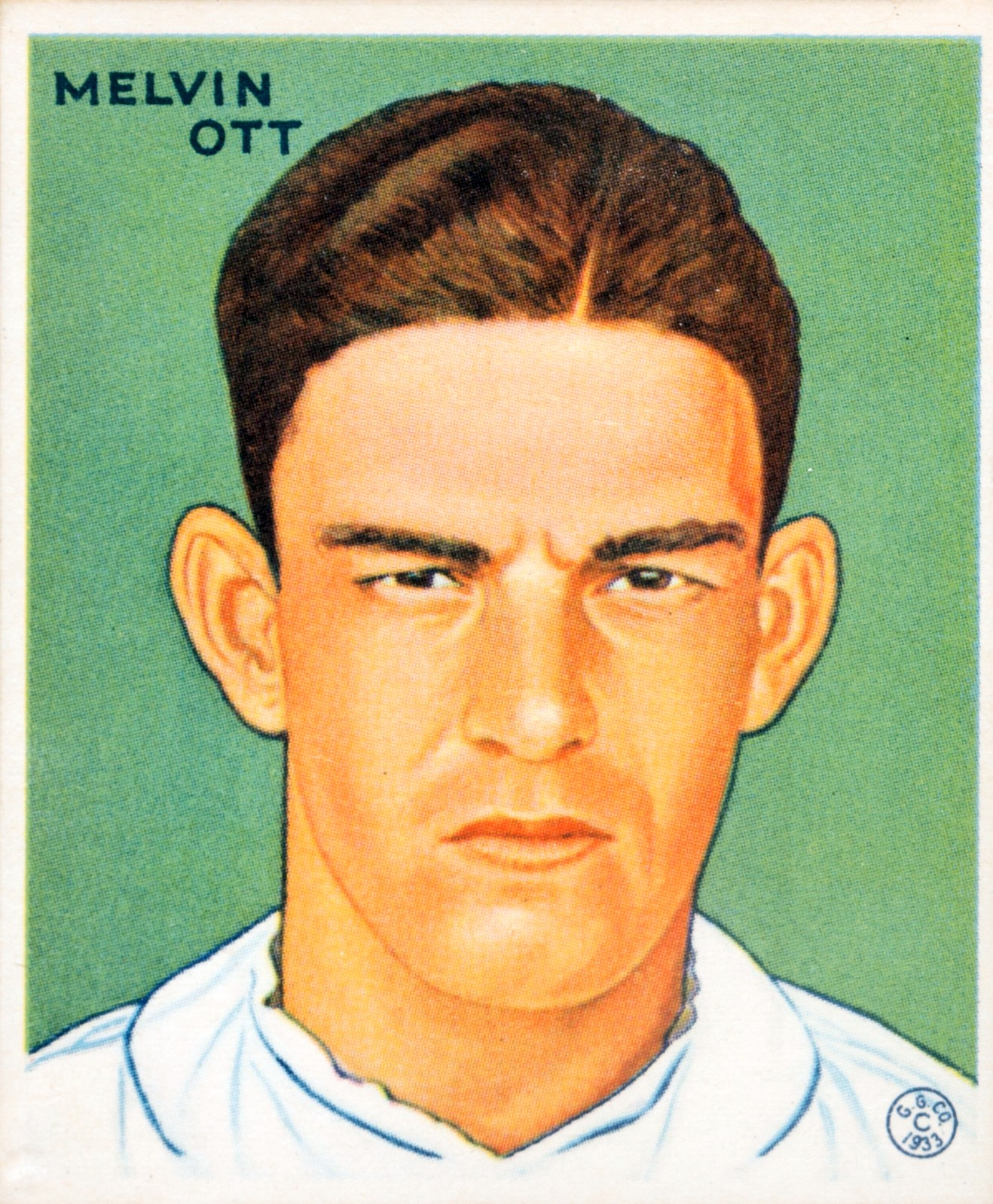
- Mel Ott
  Mel Ott (1909–1958), Hall of Fame baseball player
- George T. Oubre (1918–1998), politician; from St. James Parish
- Darrell Ourso (born 1964), member of the Louisiana House of Representatives from East Baton Rouge Parish (since 2015)
- Jessel Ourso (1932–1978), sheriff of Iberville Parish
- John H. Overton (1875–1948), US senator

== P ==
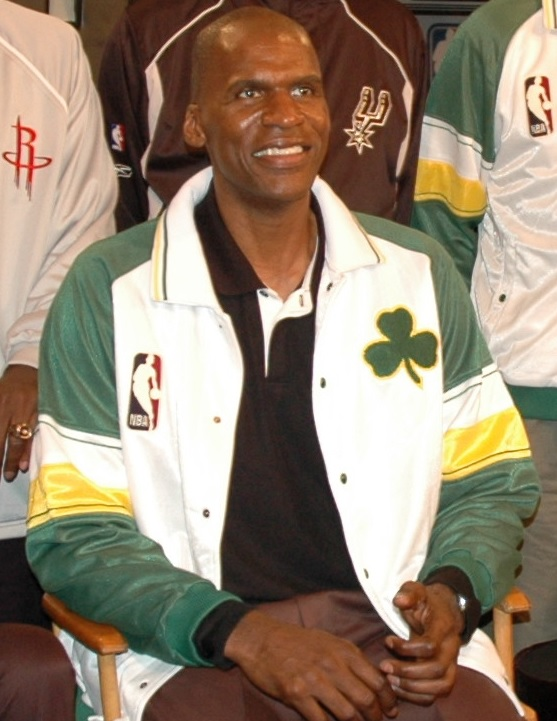
Robert Parish

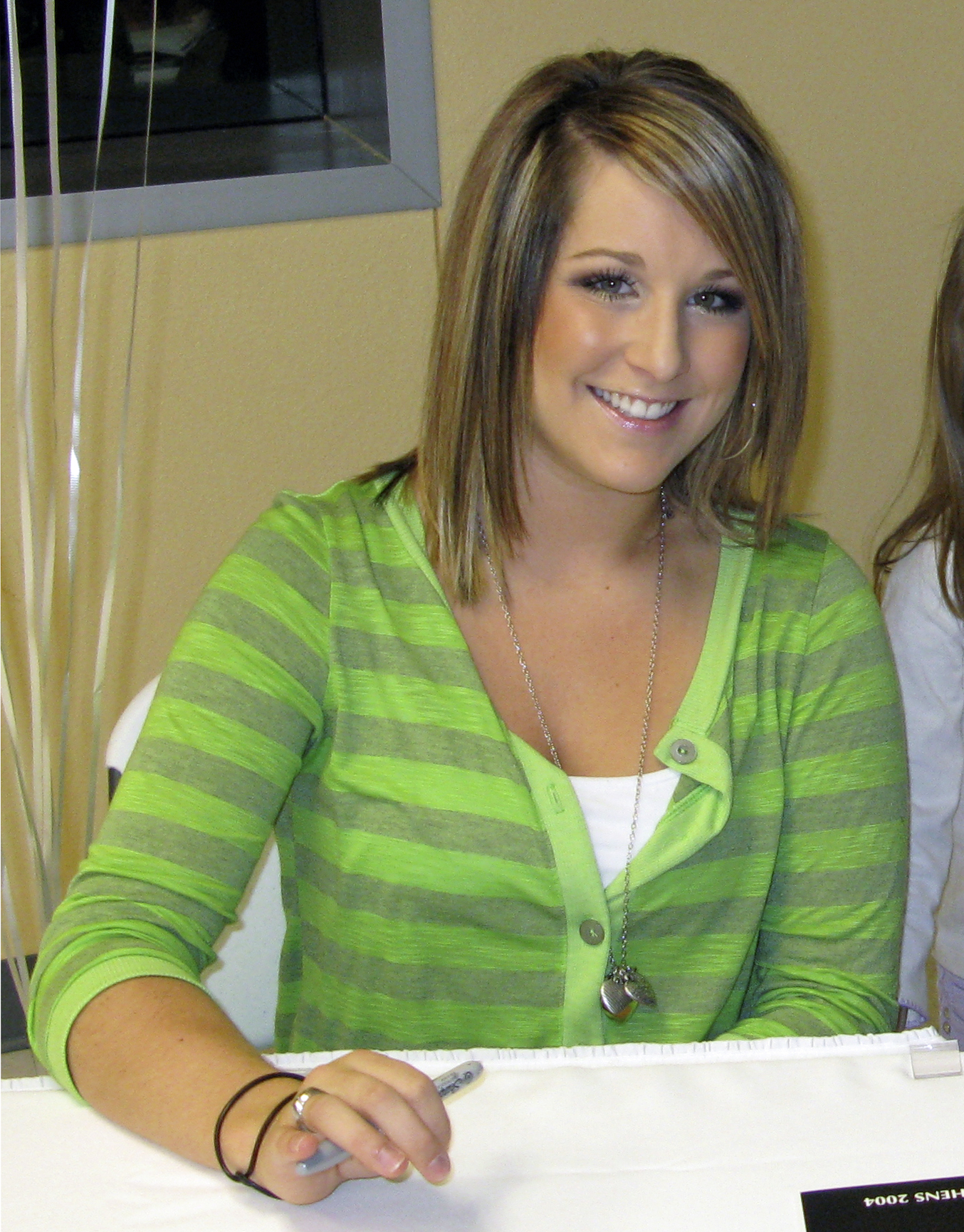
Carly Patterson

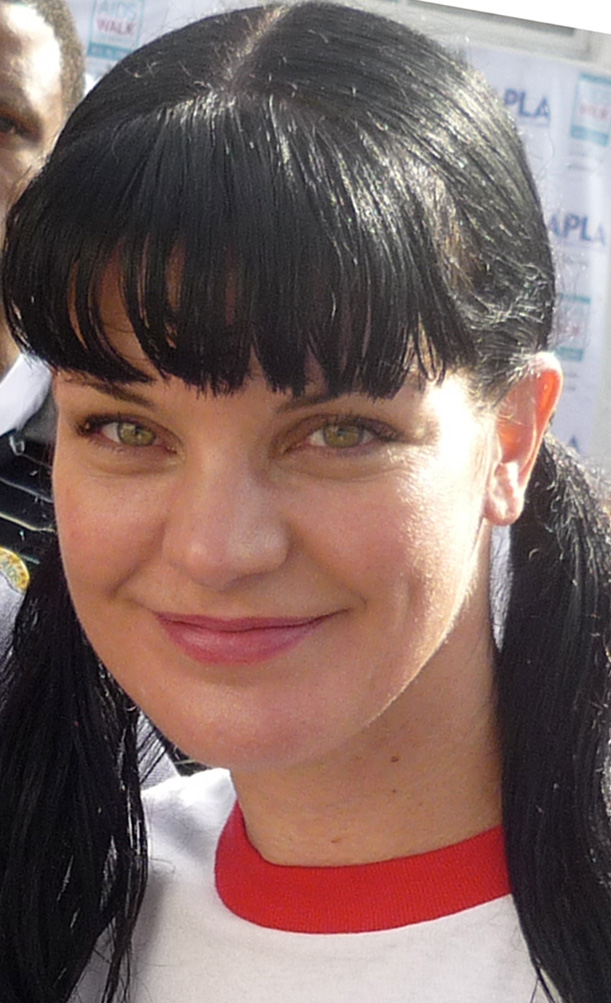
Pauley Perrette

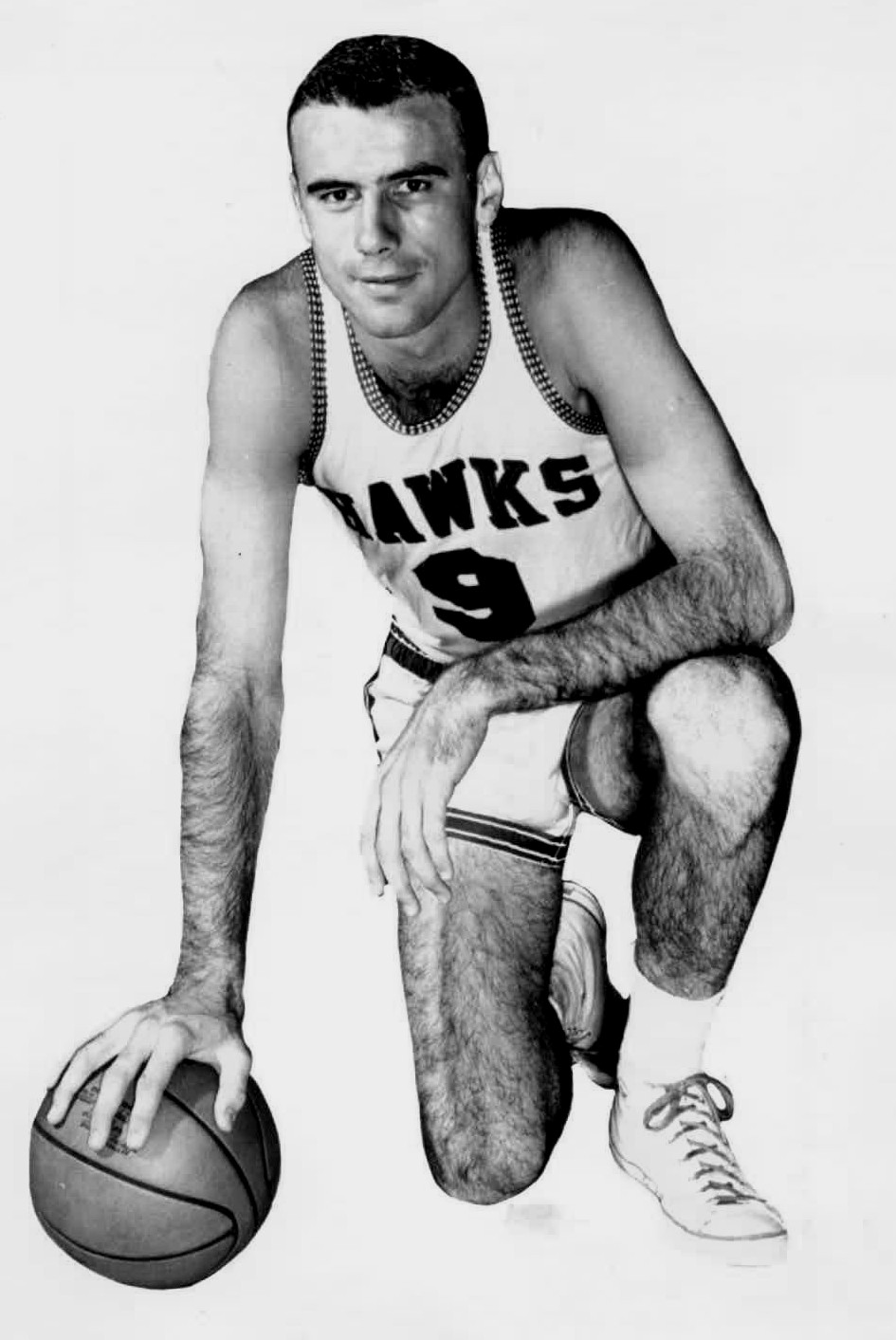
Bob Pettit

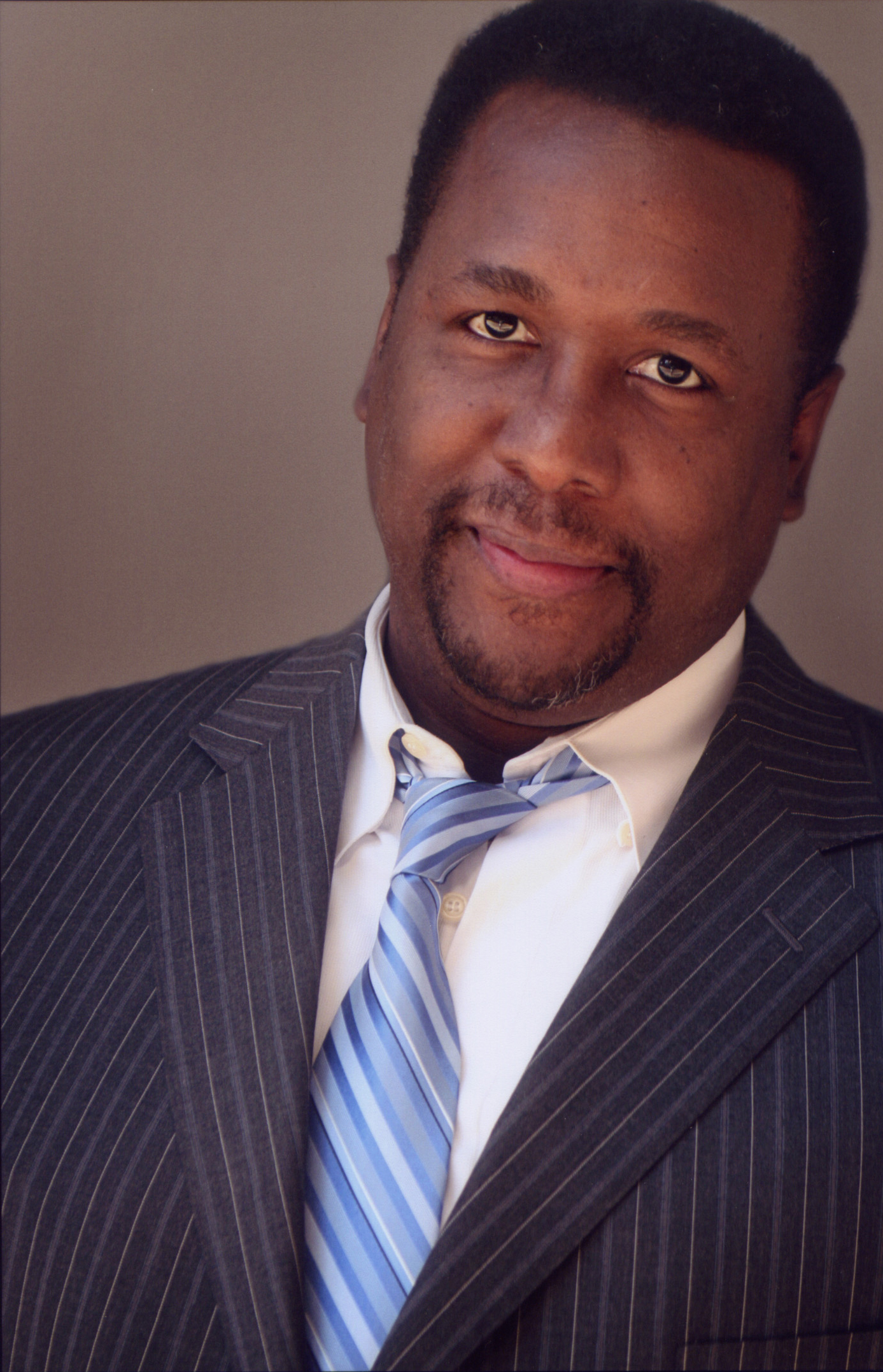
Wendell Pierce

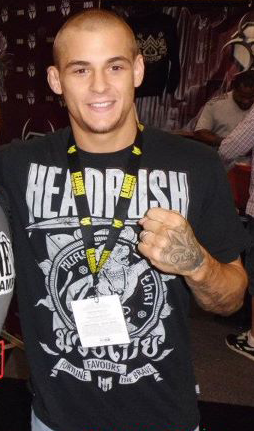
Dustin Poirier

- Robert Pack (born 1969), NBA player and coach
- James George Palmer (1875–1952), mayor of Shreveport (1930–32); judge, Louisiana Circuit Court of Appeals (1932–33)
- Jonathan Papelbon (born 1980), closer for the Philadelphia Phillies
- Robert Parish (born 1953), Hall of Fame basketball player
- John M. Parker (1863–1939), governor of Louisiana (1920–24)
- John Victor Parker (1928–2014), federal judge (1979–2014)
- Mel Parnell (1922–2012), pitcher for the Boston Red Sox
- Edward Grady Partin (1924–1990), Teamsters Union business agent in Baton Rouge
- Otto Passman (1900–1988), U.S. representative
- William S. Patout III (1932–2017), sugar grower in Iberia Parish
- Carly Patterson (born 1988), Olympic gold medalist in gymnastics
- Elfrid Payton (born 1994), point guard for the Orlando Magic of the National Basketball Association
- Nicholas Payton (born 1973), musician
- Joe Raymond Peace (born 1945), football coach
- Kevin Pearson (born 1959), politician
- Jesse Pearson (1930–1979), actor and screenwriter
- William S. Peck Sr. (1873–1946), politician
- Harvey Peltier Jr. (1923–1980), politician
- Harvey Peltier Sr. (1899–1977), politician
- Walker Percy (1916–1990), author
- Leander Perez (1891–1969), district judge; political boss of St. Bernard and Plaquemine parishes (1919–69)
- Tony Perkins (born 1963), conservative politician; head of the Family Research Council
- Ralph Perlman (1917–2013), state budget director (1967–88)
- Pauley Perrette (born 1969), singer and actress (NCIS)
- Ryan Perrilloux (born 1987), quarterback
- Jonathan W. Perry (born 1973), politician
- Tyler Perry (born 1969), television and film producer, writer, actor, director
- Jace Peterson (born 1990), second baseman for the Atlanta Braves
- Aristos Petrou (born 1990), musician; member of the rap duo Suicideboys
- Bob Pettit (1932–2026), Hall of Fame basketball player (1954–65)
- Andy Pettitte (born 1972), former starting pitcher for the New York Yankees and Houston Astros
- Marguerite Piazza (1921–2012), operatic soprano
- Abe E. Pierce III (1934–2021), politician; educator
- Webb Pierce (1921–1991), singer
- Wendell Pierce (born 1962), actor, Bunk Moreland on The Wire
- Juan Pierre (born 1977), outfielder for the Miami Marlins
- P.B.S. Pinchback (1837–1921), politician, governor of Louisiana
- Glen Pitre (born 1955), filmmaker
- Loulan Pitre Jr. (born 1961), lawyer in New Orleans; former state representative for Lafourche Parish
- Montgomery Pittman (1917–1962), actor, screenwriter, producer, known for 77 Sunset Strip
- Vance Plauché (1897–1976), U.S. representative, 1941–1943
- Dustin Poirier (born 1989), UFC fighter
- Lloyd Harlin Polite (born 1986), R&B singer
- Leonidas Polk (1806–1864), Confederate general; Episcopal bishop; founder of Sewanee: The University of the South
- Tracy Porter (born 1986), cornerback for the Oakland Raiders
- Dante Powell, stand-up comedian
- Mike Powell (born 1961), Shreveport politician
- Robert E. Powell (1923–1997), mayor of Monroe 1979–1996
- Julien de Lallande Poydras (1740–1824), poet, politician
- Phil Preis (born 1950), politician
- Sister Helen Prejean (born 1938), activist
- Arthur T. Prescott (1863–1942), educator and founding president of Louisiana Tech University
- Dak Prescott (born 1993), quarterback for the Dallas Cowboys
- Edward J. Price (born 1953), state representative for Ascension, Iberville, and St. James parishes (since 2012)
- Louis Prima (1910–1978), musician, entertainer
- Professor Longhair (1918–1980), musician
- Albin Provosty (1865–1932), politician from New Roads
- Paul Prudhomme (1940–2015), chef

== Q ==
- Chris Quinn (born 1983), point guard for the New Jersey Nets

== R ==
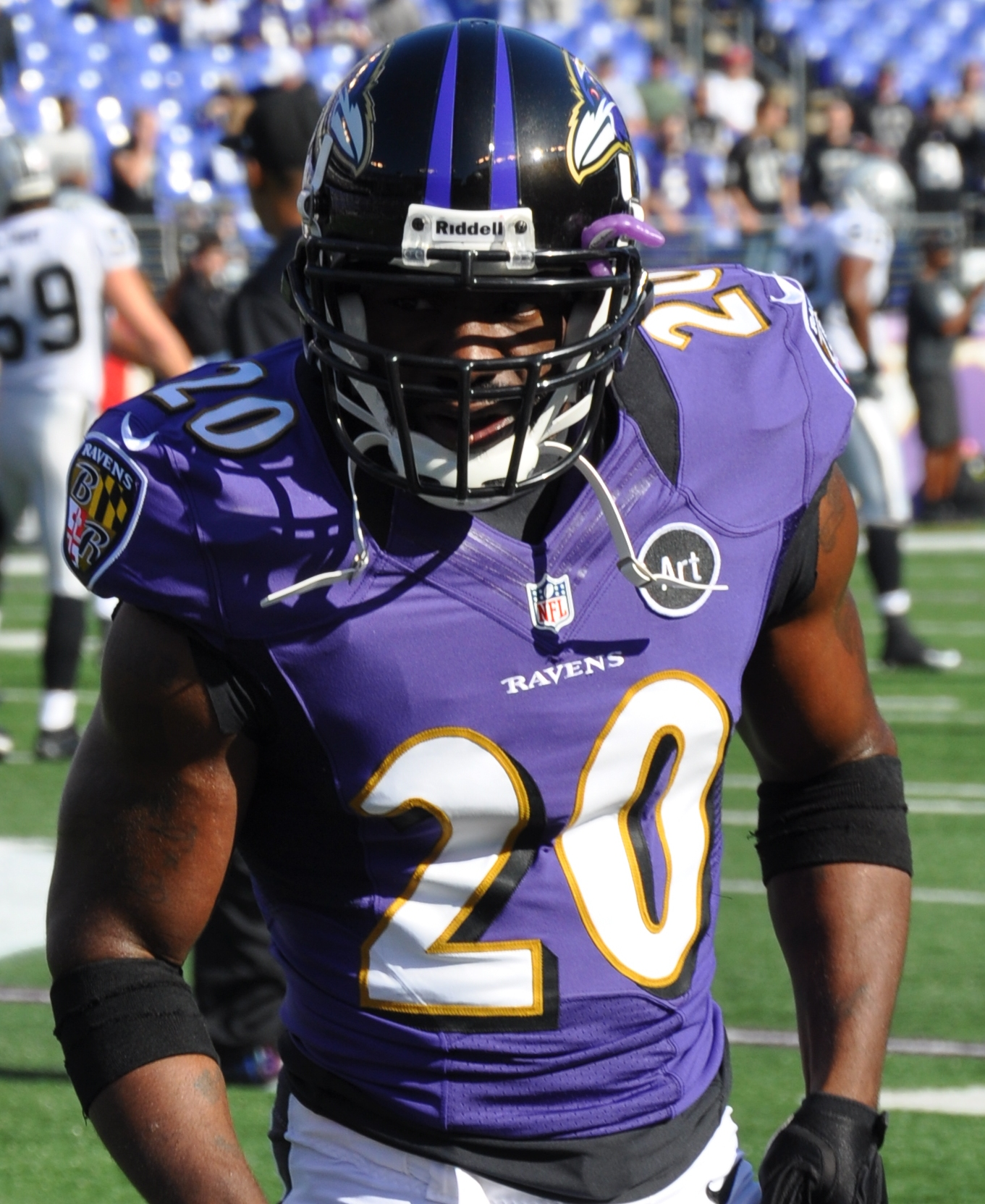
Ed Reed

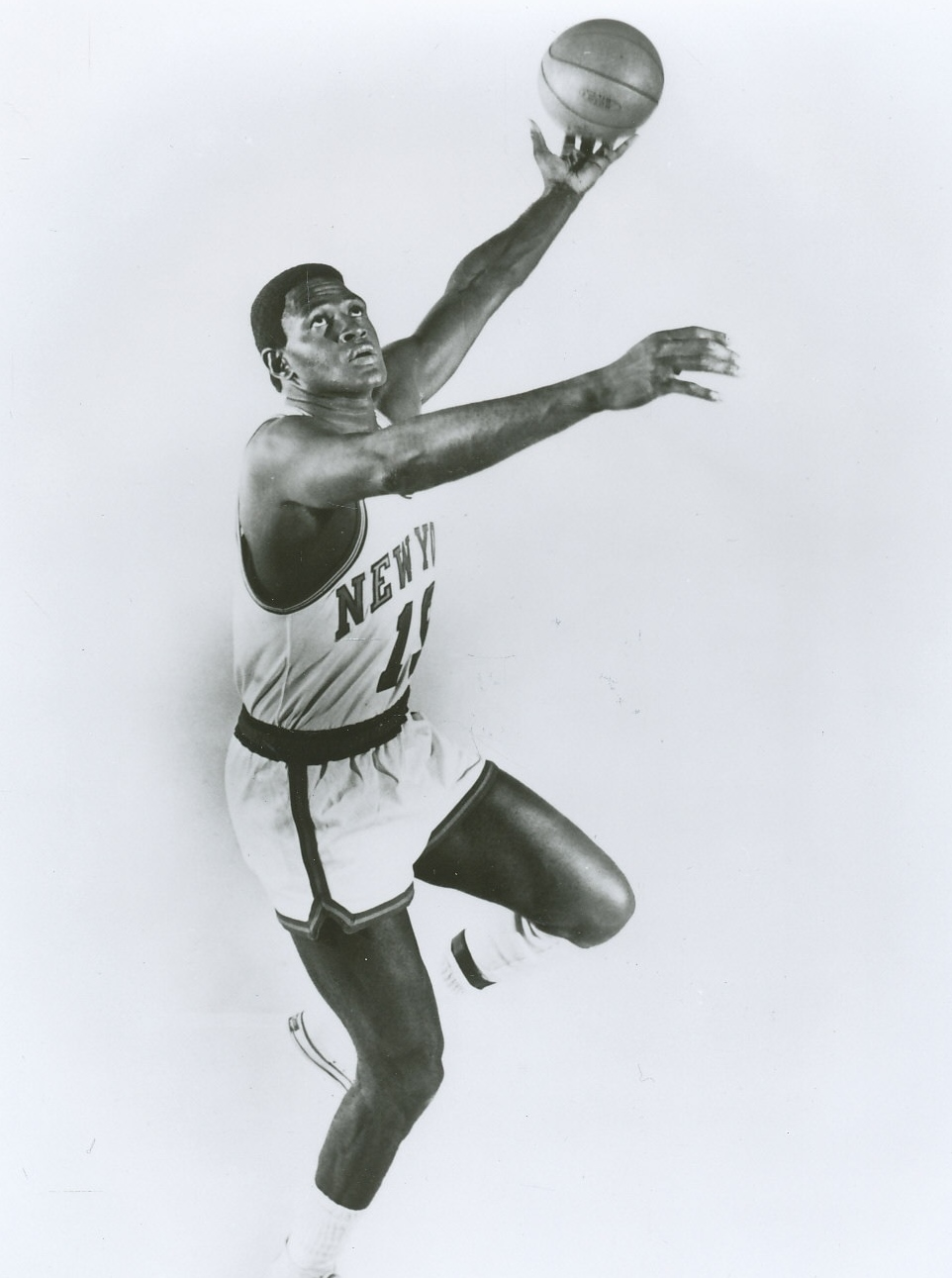
Willis Reed

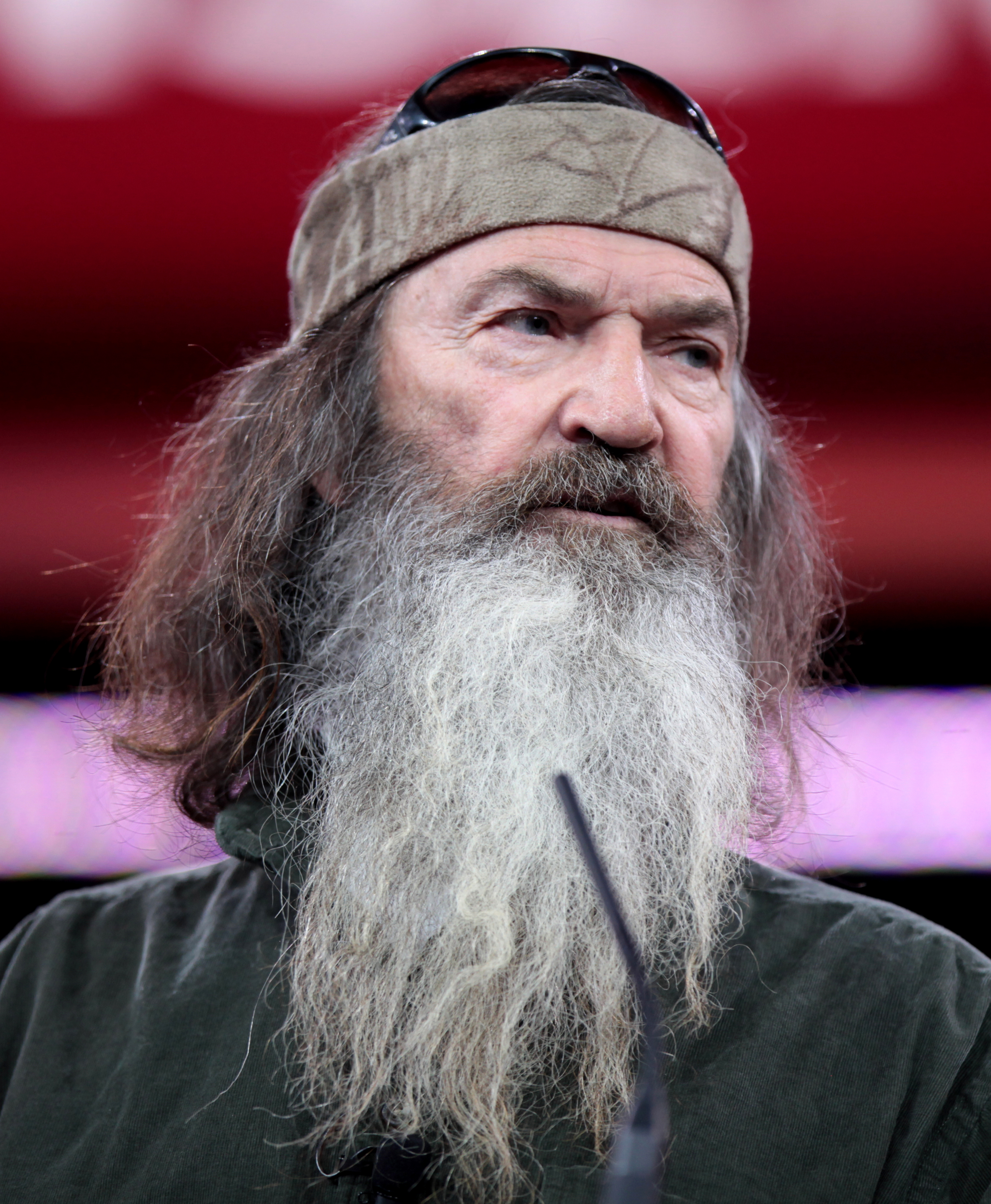
Phil Robertson

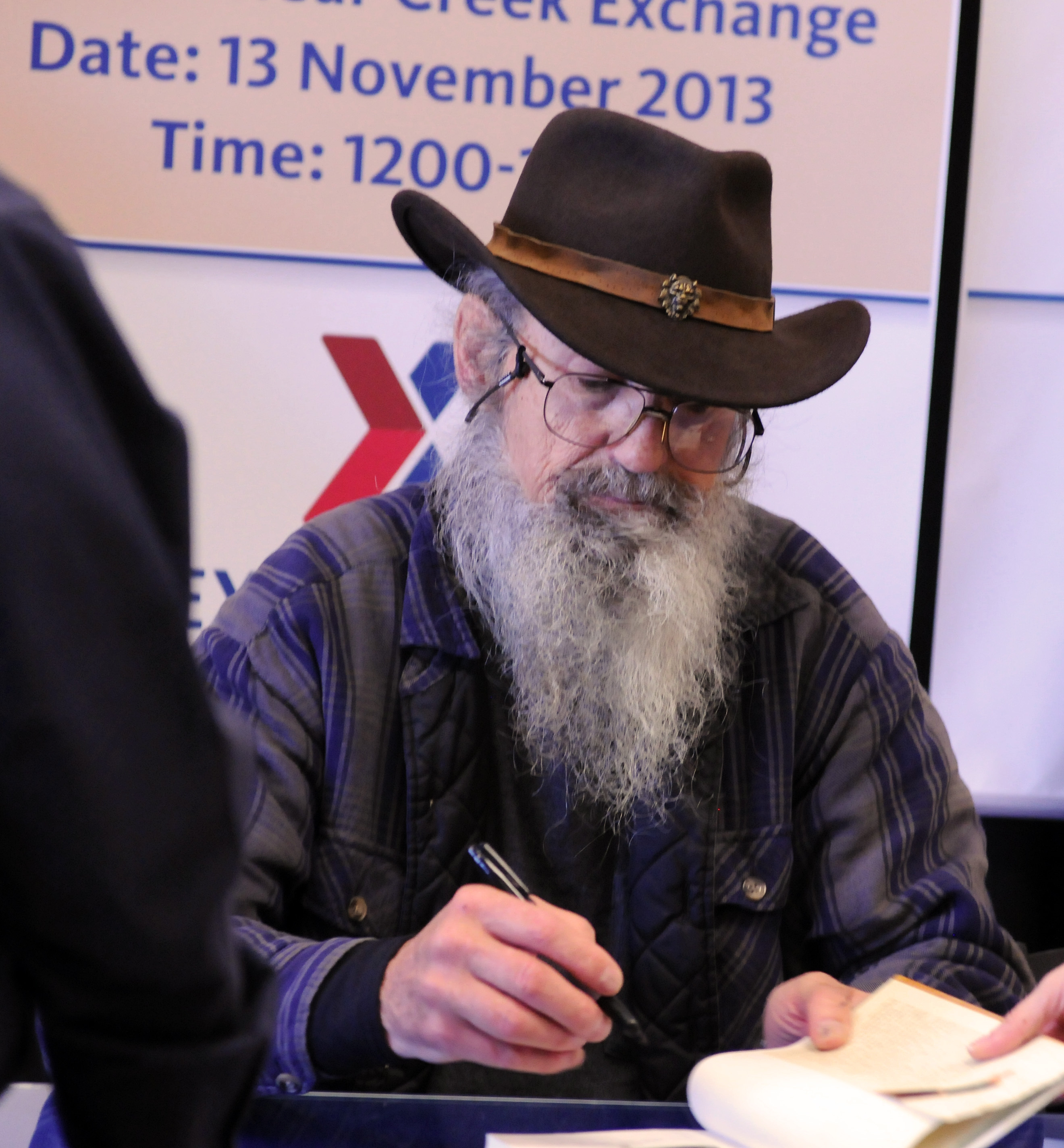
Si Robertson

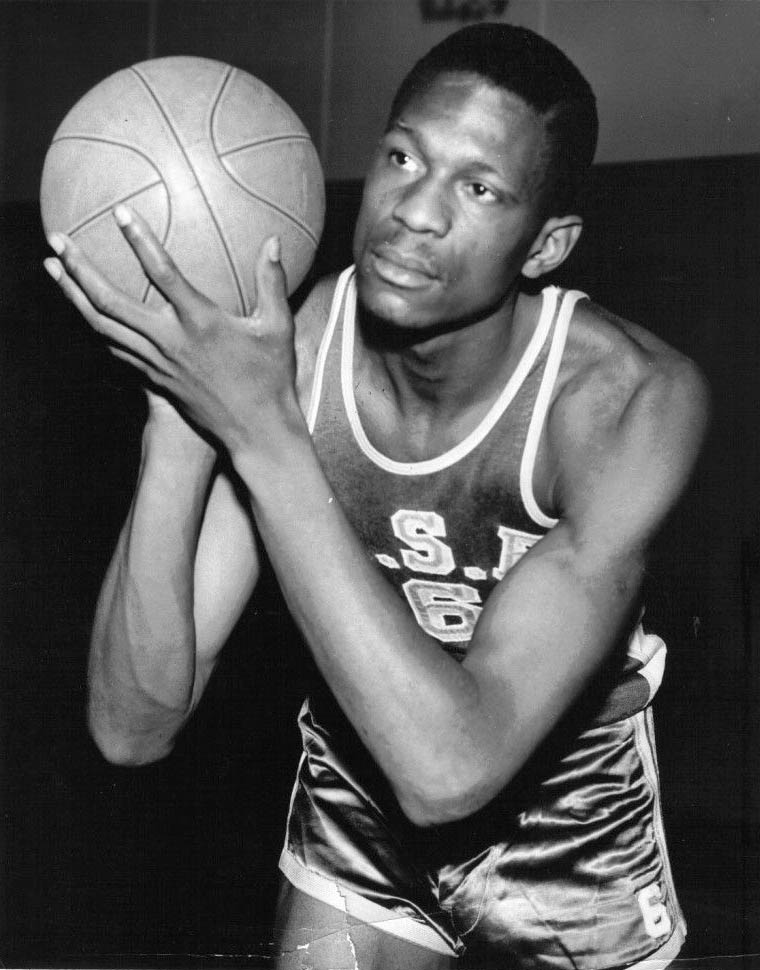
Bill Russell

- Tyrece Radford (born 1999), basketball player in the Israeli Basketball Premier League
- Paul Rae (born 1968), actor
- Max Rafferty (1917–1982), author; educator; California politician
- Henry Ragas (1897–1919), early jazz pianist
- Kevin Rahm (born 1971), actor
- Tanner Rainey (born 1992), relief pitcher for the Washington Nationals
- Melvin Rambin (1941–2001), politician; banker
- Rueben Randle (born 1991), wide receiver for the New York Giants
- Kevin Rankin (born 1976), actor, Friday Night Lights, Trauma, Unforgettable
- Ed Rand (1920–1999), state representative from Rapides Parish (1960–64)
- Joseph E. Ransdell (1858–1954), U.S. representative from Louisiana's 5th congressional district; U.S. senator (1913–31)
- John Rarick (1924–2009), US representative; state court judge
- Clyde V. Ratcliff (1879–1952), politician; planter
- Eddy Raven (born 1944), singer-songwriter
- Shawn Reaves (born 1978), actor
- Mac "Dr John" Rebbenack (born 1940), pianist, singer-songwriter
- Ed Reed (born 1978), NFL free safety
- Willis Reed (1941–2019), Hall of Fame basketball player with the New York Knicks; NBA head coach
- Pee Wee Reese (1918–1999), Hall of Fame shortstop for the Brooklyn and Los Angeles Dodgers
- Godfrey Reggio (born 1940), filmmaker
- Eric Reid (born 1991), safety for the San Francisco 49ers
- Darius Reynaud (born 1985), wide receiver and running back for the Tennessee Titans
- Slater Rhea (Shuai De, 帅德), American singer and TV personality famous in China; born in Alexandria
- Doris Lindsey Holland Rhodes (1909–1997), politician
- Anne Rice (1941–2021), author
- Jerome "Dee" Richard (born 1955), politician
- Teddy Riley (1924–1992), jazz trumpeter
- Norbert Rilleaux (1806–1894), inventor; engineer
- Neil Riser (born 1962), state senator, 2008–2020; state representative since 2020
- Randy Roach (born 1951), mayor of Lake Charles since 2000
- Rob49 (born 1999), rapper
- Cokie Roberts (1943–2019), television journalist; author; daughter of Hale Boggs and Lindy Boggs
- Kay Robertson (born 1950), television personality
- Phil Robertson (born 1946), television personality
- Si Robertson (born 1948), television personality
- Scotty Robertson (1930–2011), basketball coach
- Greg Robinson (born 1992), offensive tackle for the St. Louis Rams
- W. C. Robinson (1861–1914), educator
- George Rodrigue (1944–2013), "Blue Dog" artist
- Buddy Roemer (1943–2021), governor of Louisiana (1988–92)
- Charles E. Roemer II (1923–2012), state commissioner of administration (1972–80)
- Ned Romero (1925–2017), actor; originally from Franklin
- Ralph L. Ropp (1897–1982), president of Louisiana Tech University (1949–62)
- Leon Roppolo (1902–1943), musician
- Jacques Roy (born 1970), mayor of Alexandria (since 2006)
- Alvin Benjamin Rubin (1920–1991), federal judge
- Barry Rubin (born 1957), head strength and conditioning coach of the Kansas City Chiefs in the NFL
- Bill Russell (born 1934), Hall of Fame center for the Boston Celtics; NBA coach
- Weldon Russell (born 1946), politician; businessman

== S ==
- Jeffrey D. Sadow (born 1962), political scientist; columnist; educator
- Larry Sale (1893–1977), sheriff of Claiborne Parish
- Joe R. Salter (born 1943), politician, educator
- Brandon Sampson (born 1997), basketball player for Hapoel Be'er Sheva of the Israeli Basketball Premier League
- A. T. "Apple" Sanders Jr. (1926–1989), member of the Louisiana House of Representatives from East Baton Rouge Parish (1956–64)
- Joel Savoy, musician and music producer
- Marc Savoy (born 1940), musician and accordion builder
- Wilson Savoy (born 1982), Grammy-winning musician
- Kurtis Scaletta, writer
- Clay Schexnayder (born 1969), state representative; businessman
- John Schroder (born 1961), former state representative from Covington; businessman
- Mike Scifres (born 1980), punter for the San Diego Chargers
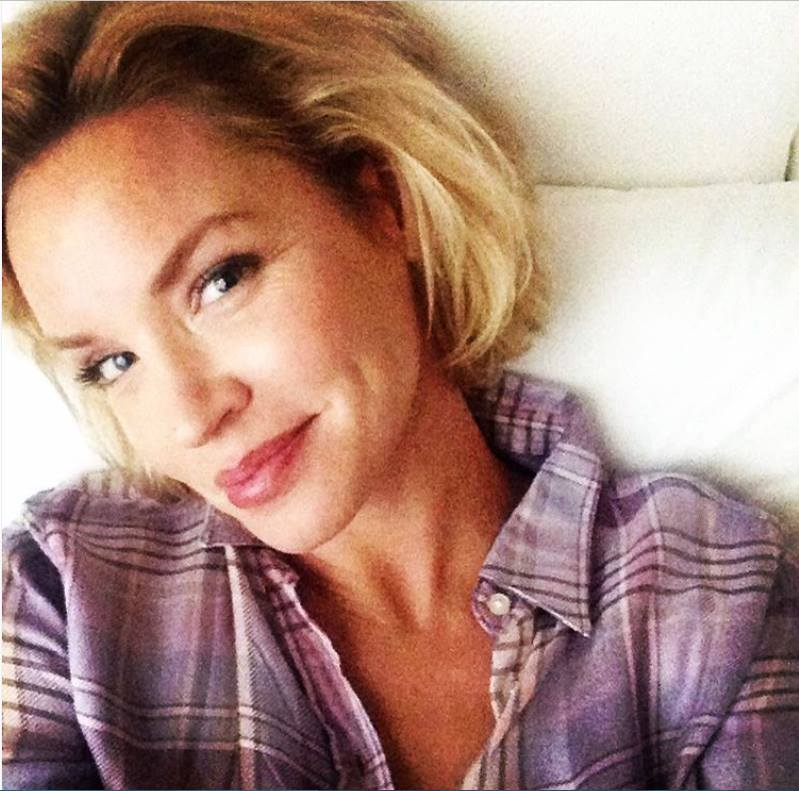
- Ashley Scott
  Ashley Scott (born 1977), actress, model, Jericho, Dark Angel, Birds of Prey
- Nauman Scott (1916–2001), U.S. District Court judge
- Pat Screen (1943–1994), mayor-president of East Baton Rouge Parish (1981–88)
- Alan Seabaugh (born 1967), state representative
- J.C. Seaman (1898–1964), state representative from Tensas Parish (1944–64)
- Sam Seamans (born 1967), Anglican Church bishop in Mountain Home, Arkansas; born in Morgan City
- Aaron Selber Jr. (1927–2013), businessman and philanthropist
- Joe Sevario (born 1944), state senator from Ascension Parish, 1976–94
- Henry Clay Sevier (1896–1974), politician
- V. C. Shannon (1910–1989), politician
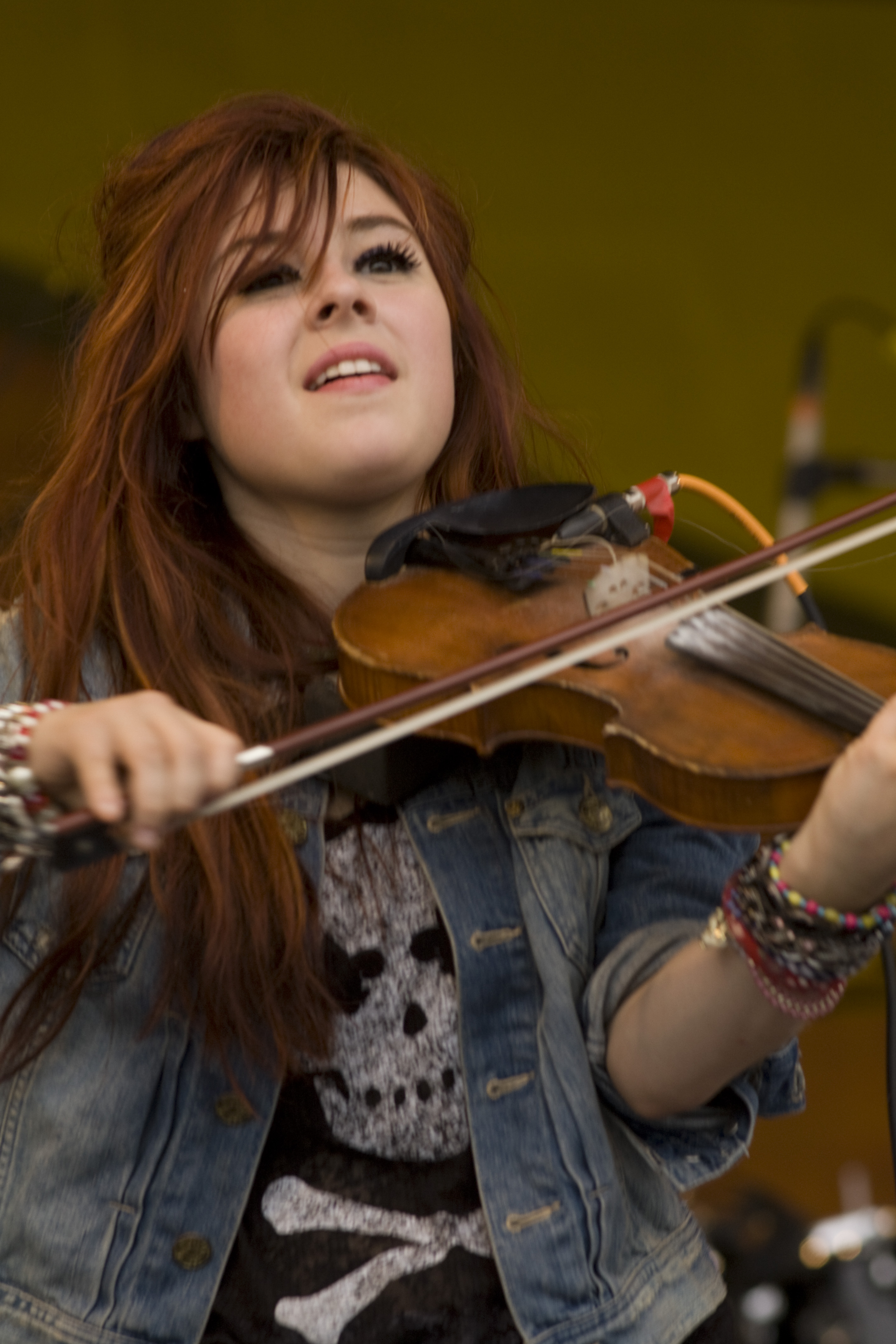
- Amanda Shaw
  Amanda Shaw (born 1990), actress; singer; fiddler
- B. L. Shaw (1933–2018), former state senator, educator
- Rhonda Shear (born 1954), beauty queen; television host
- Ben Sheets (born 1978), MLB pitcher
- Virginia Shehee (1923–2015), first woman elected to Louisiana Senate
- Clarence Shelmon (born 1952), NFL offensive coordinator
- Kenny Wayne Shepherd (born 1977), musician
- Alana Shipp (born 1982), American-Israeli IFBB professional bodybuilder
- Chris Shivers (born 1978), professional bull rider
- Henry Miller Shreve (1785–1854), inventor; steamboat captain
- Phil Short (born 1947), state senator; relocated to Virginia
- Rockin' Sidney (1938–1998), zydeco musician
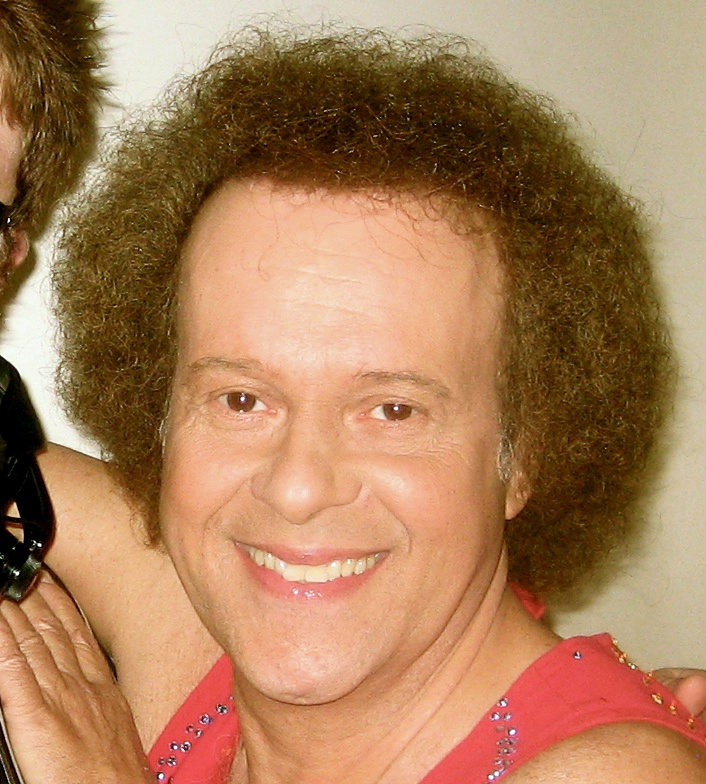
- Richard Simmons
  Richard Simmons (born 1948), fitness authority; television personality
- Scott M. Simon (born 1961), state representative
- Tharold Simon (born 1991), cornerback for the Seattle Seahawks
- Frank P. Simoneaux (born 1933), state representative from East Baton Rouge Parish (1972–82)
- C. O. Simpkins Sr. (1925–2019), state representative from Shreveport; civil rights activist, and dentist
- Cuthbert Ormond Simpkins Jr. (born 1947), physician and historian, reared in Shreveport
- Oramel H. Simpson (1870–1932), governor of Louisiana (1926–28)
- Fulwar Skipwith (1765–1839), diplomat; politician
- Eric Skrmetta (born 1958), politician
- John Slidell (1793–1871), U.S. senator; Confederate diplomat
- Soulja Slim (1977–2003), musician
- Donald Sloan (born 1988), guard for the Atlanta Hawks
- Argile Smith (born 1955), interim president of Louisiana College (2014–15)
- George Luke Smith (1837–1884), U.S. representative from Louisiana's 4th congressional district
- Howard K. Smith (1914–2002), television journalist; reporter
- Jasper K. Smith (1905–1992), politician
- John R. Smith (born 1945), politician
- Otis Smith (born 1965), New England Patriots cornerback; Kansas City Chiefs assistant coach
- Patricia Haynes Smith (born 1946), state representative from Baton Rouge
- Jefferson B. Snyder (1859–1951), politician
- Robert H. Snyder (1855–1905), politician
- Guy Sockrider (1921–2011), politician
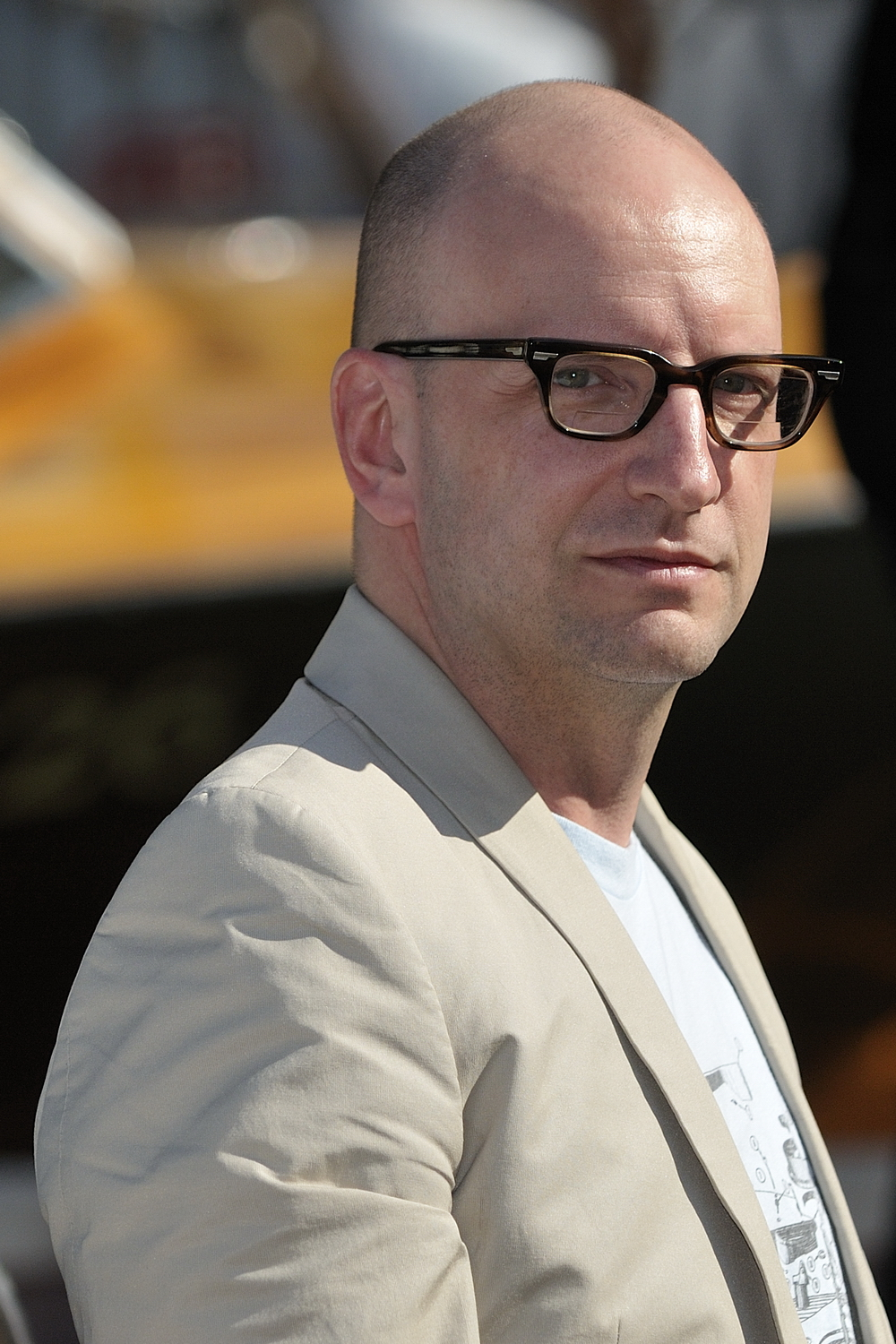
- Steven Soderbergh
  Steven Soderbergh (born 1963), film producer; screenwriter; cinematographer; director
- Floyd Soileau (born 1938), record producer
- Jennifer Soileau (born 1975), former professional soccer player
- Leo Soileau (1904–1980), fiddler
- Ian Somerhalder (born 1978), actor; model
- Art Sour (1924–2000), State Representative from Shreveport (1972–92)
- James Z. Spearing (1864–1942), politician
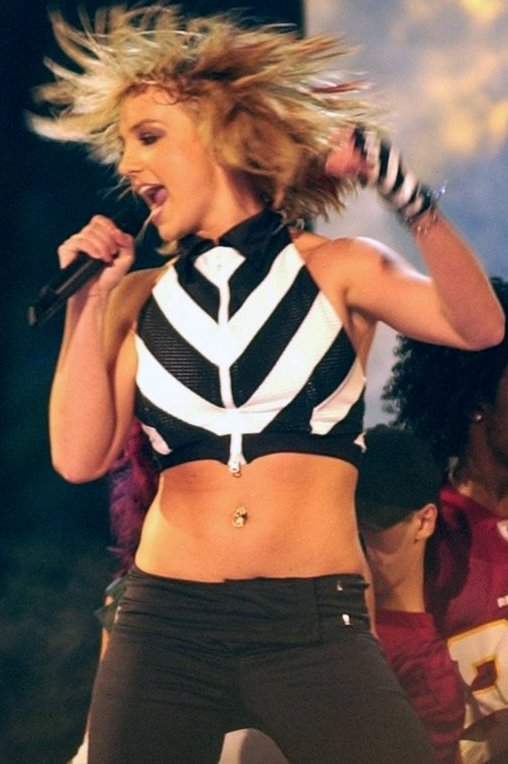
- Britney Spears
  Britney Spears (born 1981), singer; actress
- Bryan Spears (born 1977), film and television producer
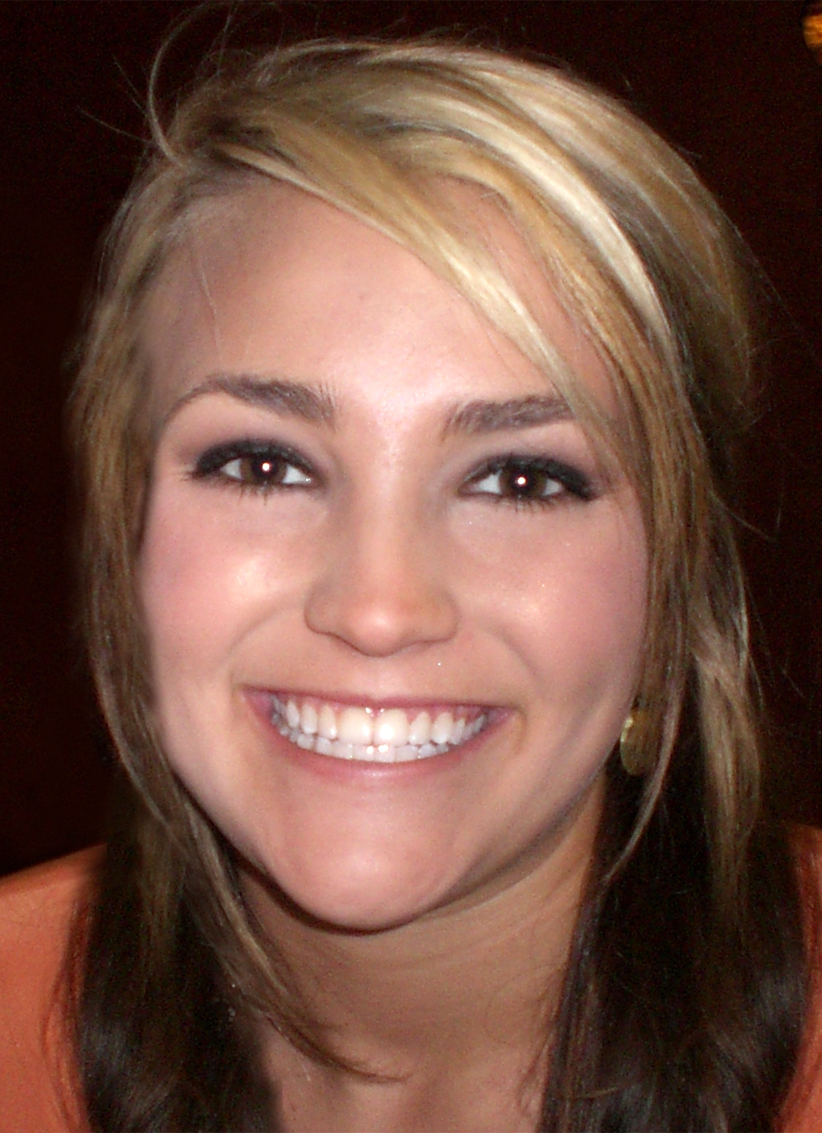
- Jamie Lynn Spears
  Jamie Lynn Spears (born 1991), actress; singer
- Lynne Spears (born 1955), author
- Marcus Spears (born 1983), defensive end for the Dallas Cowboys
- Freddie Spencer (born 1961), world motorcycle champion
- Mason Spencer (1892–1962), politician
- Tommy Spinks (1948–2007), football player
- Tam Spiva (1932–2017), screenwriter
- Frank Spooner (born 1937), businessman and politician
- Grove Stafford (1897–1975), state senator for Rapides Parish, 1940–48
- Leroy Augustus Stafford (1822–1864), Confederate brigadier general
- Tom Stagg (1923–2015), judge of the United States District Court for the Western District of Louisiana
- Rusty Staub (1944–2018), MLB right fielder, designated hitter, and first baseman
- Craig Steltz (born 1986), safety for the Chicago Bears
- Alton Sterling (1979–2016), black man fatally shot by a police officer in Baton Rouge
- Elijah Stewart (born 1995), basketball player for Hapoel Eilat of the Israeli Basketball Premier League
- Kordell Stewart (born 1972), NFL quarterback and wide receiver
- Ford E. Stinson (1914–1989), lawyer and state legislator from Bossier Parish
- Julie Stokes (born 1969), state representative from Jefferson Parish
- Brandon Stokley (born 1976), wide receiver for the Denver Broncos
- Johnathan Stove (born 1995), basketball player for Hapoel Galil Elyon of the Israeli Basketball Premier League
- Michael G. Strain (born 1959), veterinarian; state representative; Commissioner of the Louisiana Department of Agriculture and Forestry
- Roy C. Strickland (1942–2010), businessman, politician
- Raymond Strother (born 1940), political consultant
- Patrick Surtain (born 1976), NFL cornerback
- Hal Sutton (born 1958), PGA Tour golfer
- Jimmy Swaggart (born 1935), evangelist
- Marc Swayze (1913–2012), comic book writer and illustrator
- Stromile Swift (born 1979), NBA player
- Harold Sylvester (born 1949), actor, Married... with Children, Today's F.B.I., Shaky Ground

== T ==
- Joseph Talamo (born 1990), jockey
- Kirk Talbot (born 1969), state representative from Jefferson Parish
- Irvin Talton, member of the Louisiana House of Representatives for Webster Parish (1880–84)
- Elmer R. Tapper (1929–2011), politician
- Gregory Tarver (born 1946), civil rights activist, state senator from Caddo Parish
- Ray Tarver (1921–1972), dentist; represented Natchitoches Parish in state House of Representatives (1964–68)
- Albert Tate (1920–1986), state and federal judge
- Billy Tauzin (born 1943), US representative; lobbyist
- Dorothy Mae Taylor (1928–2000), first African-American woman in the Louisiana House of Representatives (1971–80)
- Ike Taylor (born 1980), cornerback for the Pittsburgh Steelers
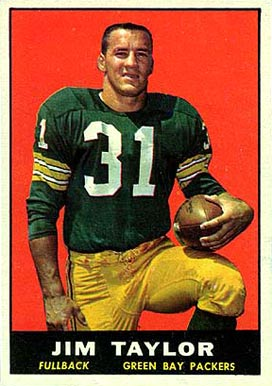
- Jim Taylor
  Jim Taylor (1935–2018), Hall of Fame fullback, primarily with the Green Bay Packers
- Richard Taylor (1826–1879), Confederate general
- Zachary Taylor (1784–1850), 12th president of the United States; US Army general
- Lloyd George Teekell (1922–1996), politician
- Garrett Temple (born 1986), point guard for the San Antonio Spurs
- Suzanne Haik Terrell (born 1954), politician
- Byron Thames (born 1969), actor and musician, Father Murphy
- Sam H. Theriot (born 1954), politician
- Ryan Theriot (born 1979), infielder for the San Francisco Giants
- Major Thibaut (born 1977), politician
- Keith Thibodeaux (born 1950), actor
- Ledricka Thierry (born 1978), politician
- Dallas Thomas (born 1989), offensive tackle for the Miami Dolphins
- Mike Thomas (born 1987), wide receiver for the Jacksonville Jaguars
- Tyrus Thomas (born 1986), power forward for the Charlotte Bobcats
- Jeff R. Thompson (born 1965), politician
- Ken Thompson (born 1943), pioneer of computer science
- T. Ashton Thompson (1916–1965), U.S. representative
- Marcus Thornton (born 1987), shooting guard for the New Orleans Hornets
- George H. Tichenor (1837–1923), surgeon; pioneer in antiseptics
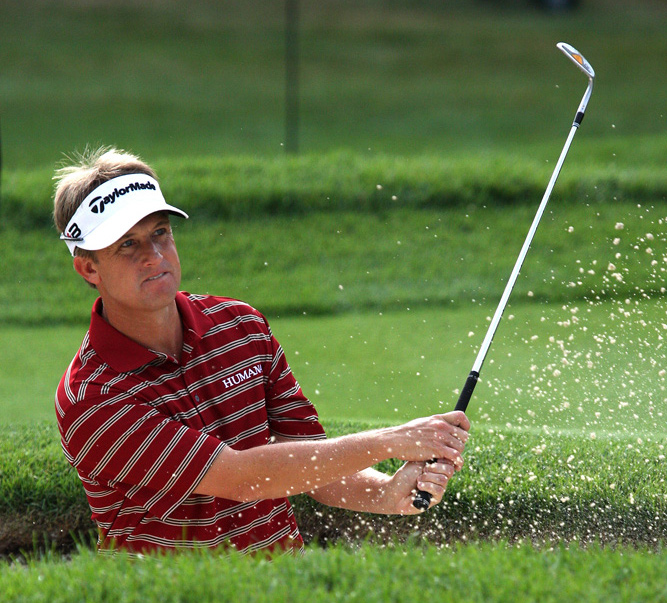
- David Toms
  David Toms (born 1967), PGA Tour golfer
- Charles Emery Tooke Jr. (1912–1986), lawyer; state senator
- John Kennedy Toole (1937–1969), author of Pulitzer Prize-winning A Confederacy of Dunces
- Reggie Torbor (born 1981), former NFL linebacker
- Alzina Toups (1927–2022), chef
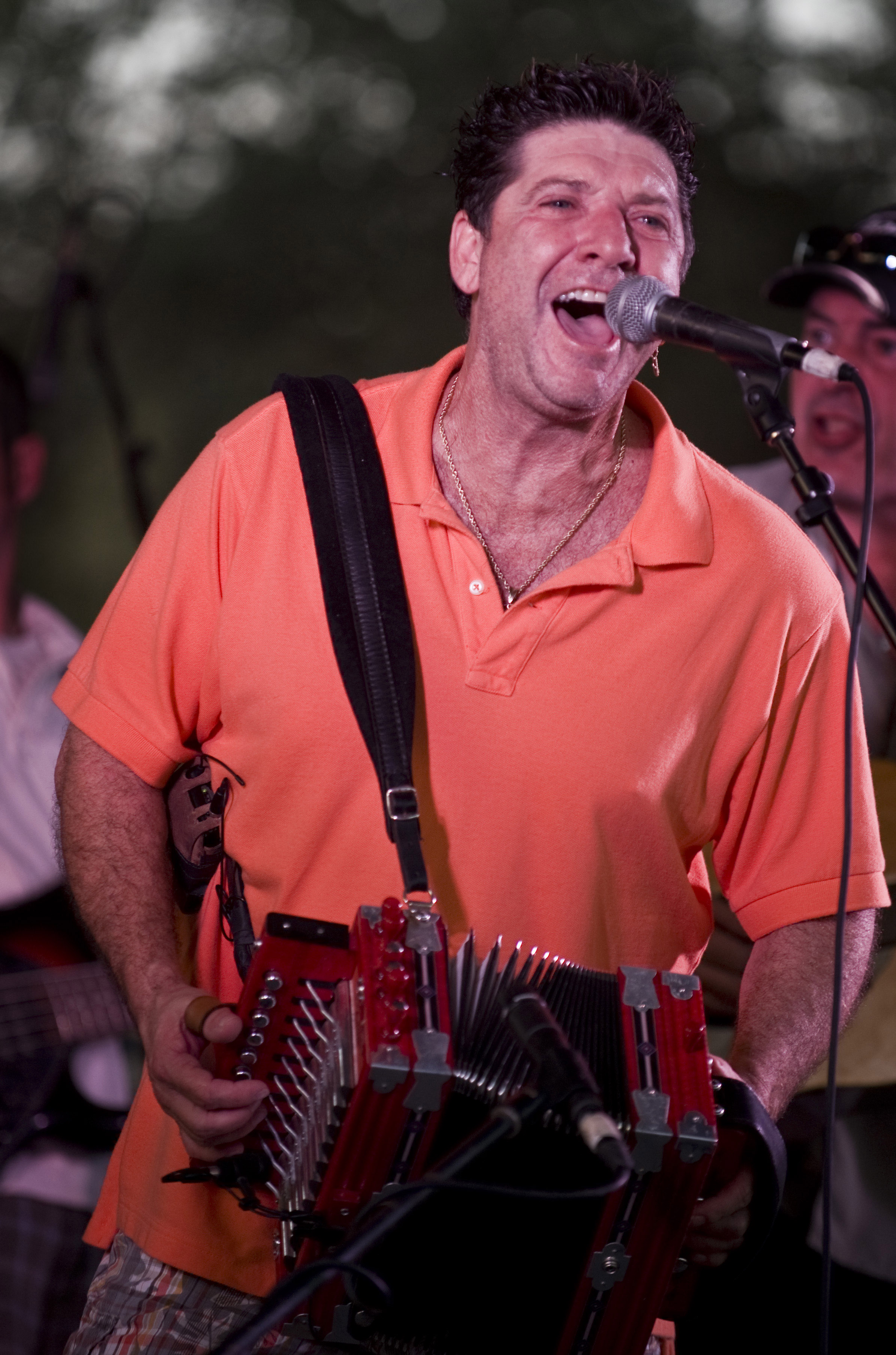
- Wayne Toups
  Wayne Toups (born 1958), musician
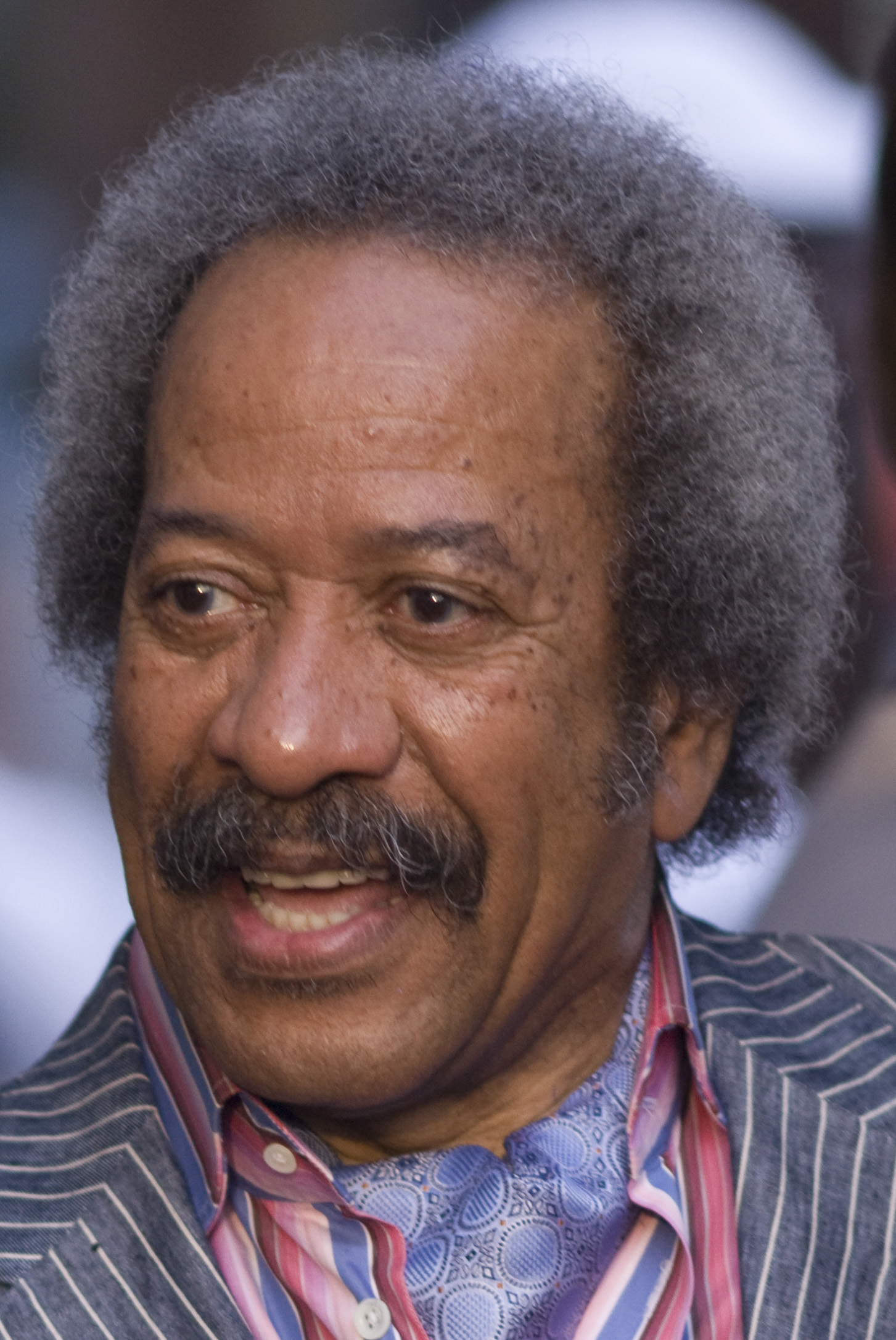
- Allen Toussaint
  Allen Toussaint (1938–2015), New Orleans musician; composer; record producer
- A. Hays Town (1903–2005), architect
- John D. Travis (1940–2016), state representative from East Feliciana Parish, 1984–2000
- David C. Treen (1928–2009), US representative (1973–80); governor of Louisiana (1980–84)
- Paul Tulane (1801–1887), businessman; philanthropist
- Ben Turpin (1869–1940), silent film comedian
- Odessa Turner (born 1964), NFL wide receiver
- Trai Turner (born 1993), guard for the Carolina Panthers
- Marshall H. Twitchell (1840–1905), politician; planter, diplomat

== U ==
- Chris Ullo (1928–2014), member of both houses of the state legislature from Jefferson Parish (1972–2008)

== V ==
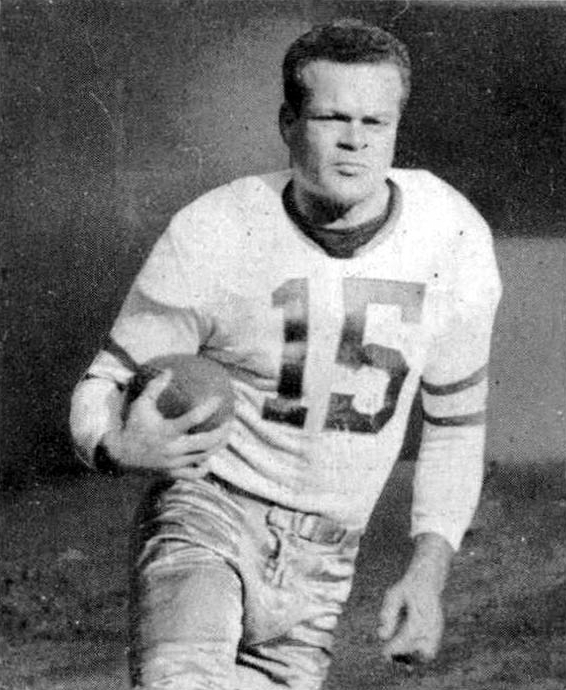
Steve Van Buren

- Steve Van Buren (1920–2012), Hall of Fame halfback for the Philadelphia Eagles
- Rose Van Thyn (1921–2010), Holocaust survivor in Shreveport
- Andrew Varona, race car driver
- Troy Verges (born 20th century), country music songwriter
- Jeffrey P. Victory (born 1946), associate justice of the Louisiana Supreme Court
- Jacques Villeré (1760–1830), Creole; governor of Louisiana; general
- Pruitt Taylor Vince (born 1960), film and television character actor
- David Vitter (born 1961), U.S. senator
- Jeffrey Vitter (born 1955), computer science professor and researcher; 17th chancellor of the University of Mississippi
- John Volz (1936–2011), U.S. attorney; prosecuted high-profile corruption cases in the 1980s
- Theo Von (born 1980), comedian and podcaster
- Cole Vosbury (born 1991), singer-songwriter, musician, and contestant on The Voice season 5

== W ==
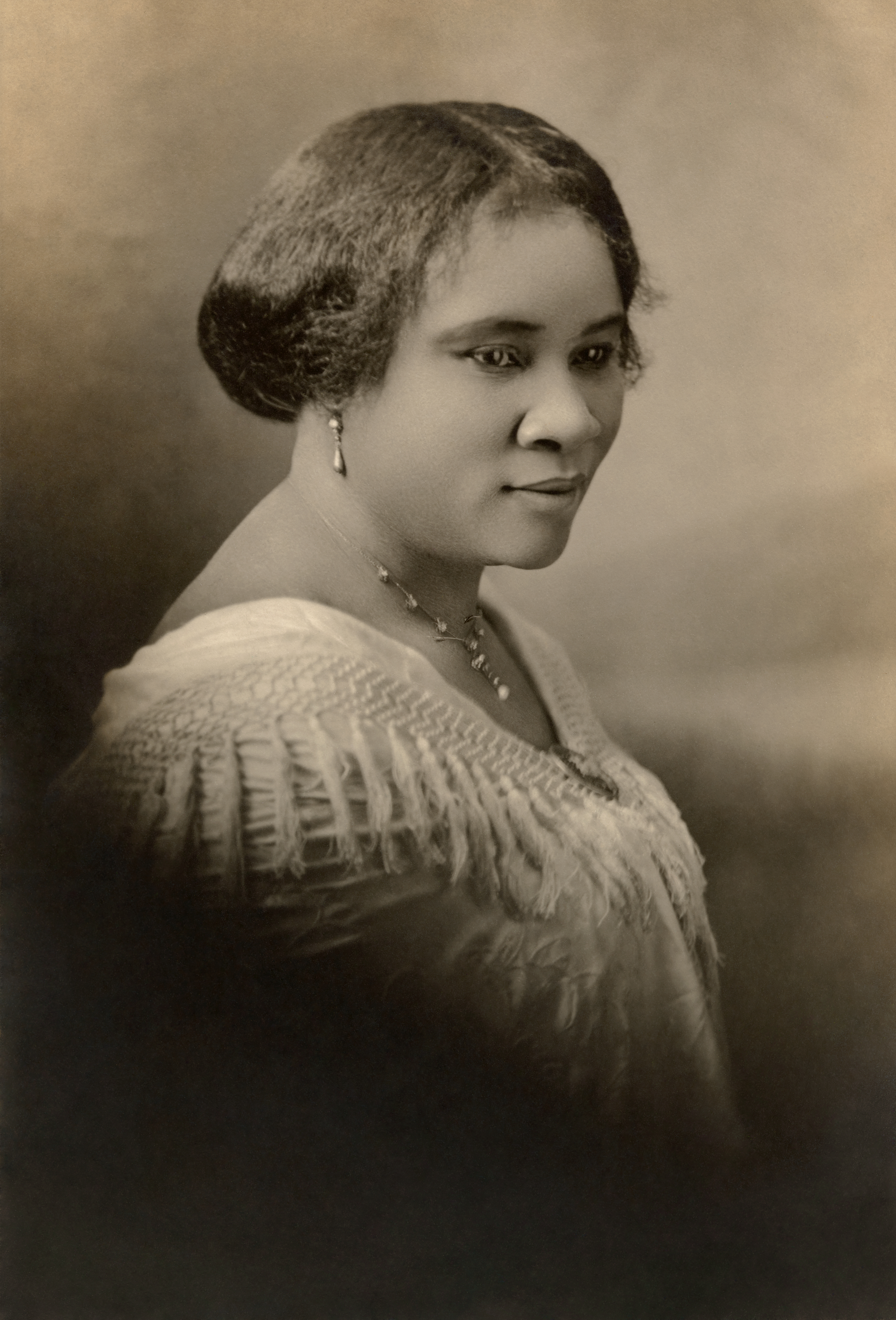
Madam C. J. Walker

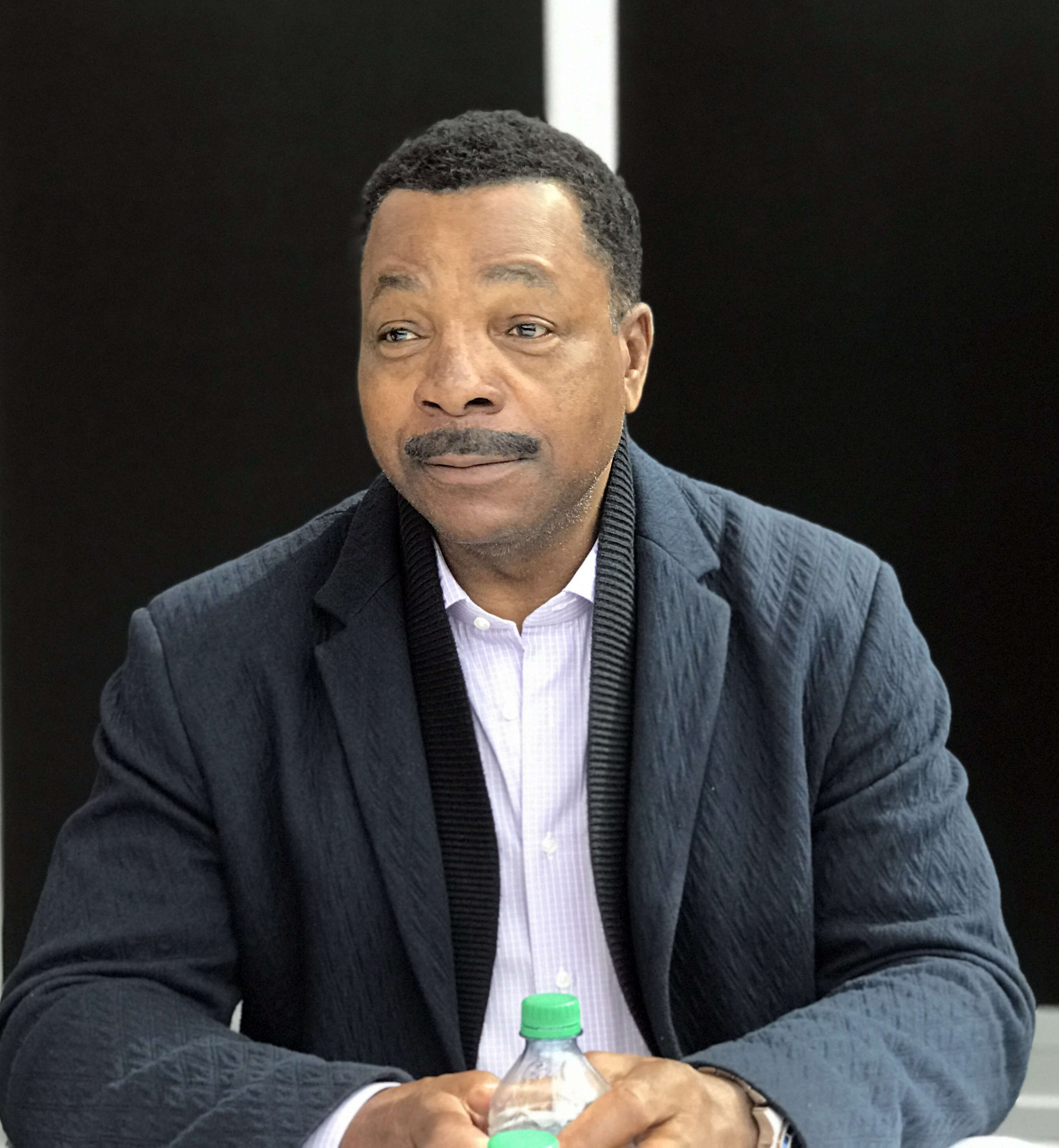
Carl Weathers

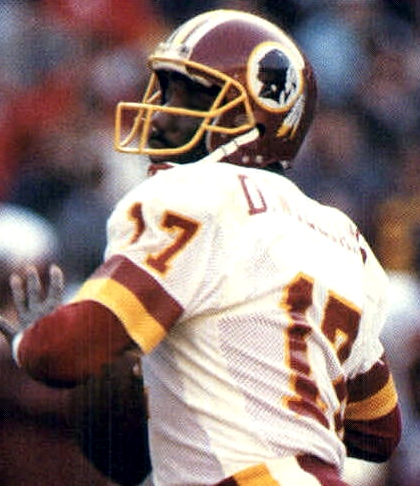
Doug Williams

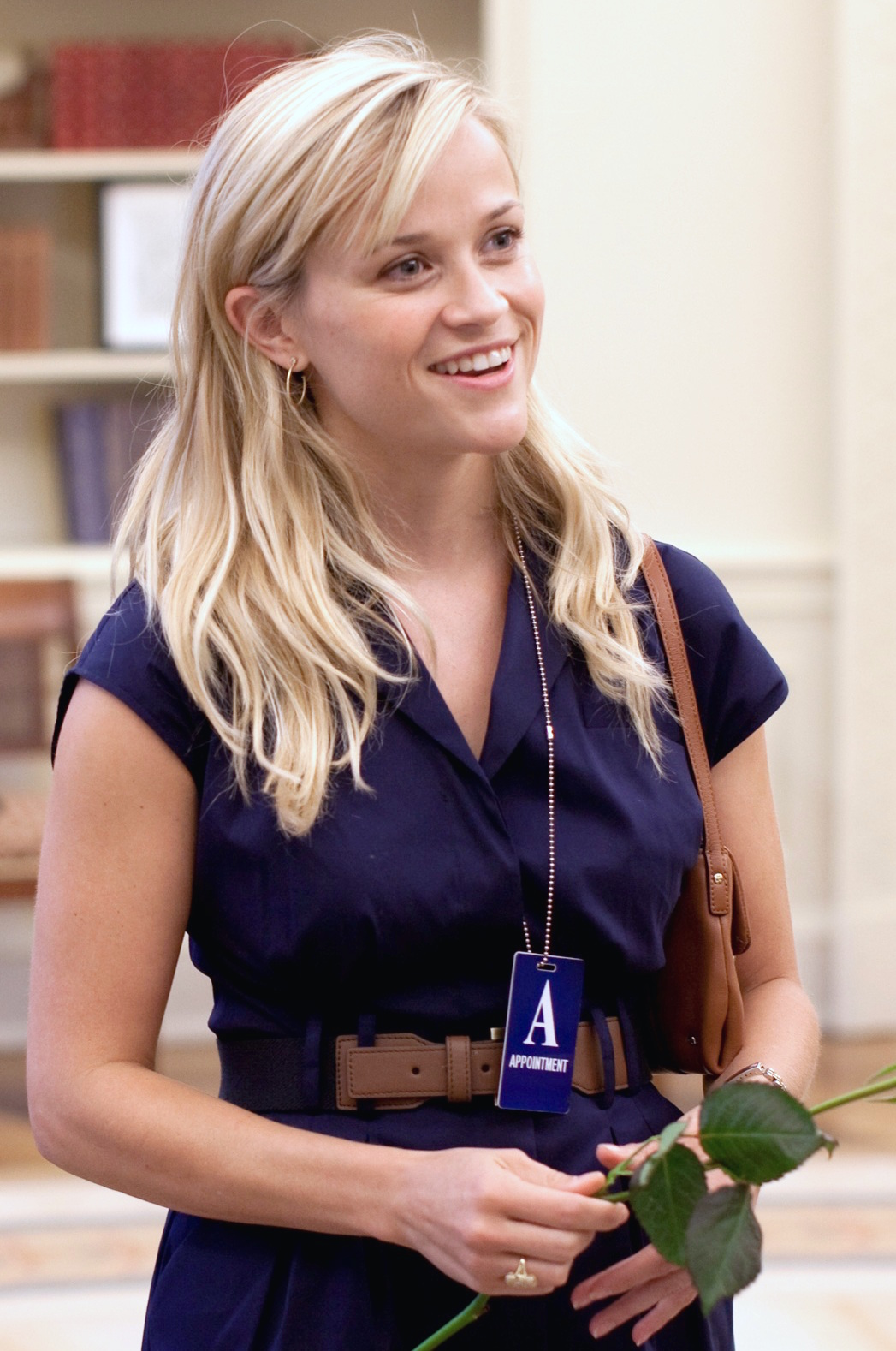
Reese Witherspoon

- David Wade (1911–1990), general
- Thomas M. Wade (1860–1929), politician; educator
- Von Wafer (born 1985), shooting guard for the Orlando Magic
- Joseph David Waggonner Jr. (1918–2007), U.S. representative from Louisiana's 4th congressional district
- W. E. "Willie" Waggonner (1905–1976), sheriff of Bossier Parish (1948–76)
- Bryan Wagner (1943–2018), Republican politician; former member of the New Orleans City Council
- Madam C. J. Walker (1867–1919), business tycoon
- Joseph Marshall Walker (1786–1856), governor of Louisiana
- Lillian W. Walker (1923–2016), politician
- Taijuan Walker (born 1992), starting pitcher for the Arizona Diamondbacks
- Mike Wallace (born 1986), wide receiver for the Pittsburgh Steelers
- Ray Walston (1914–2001), actor, My Favorite Martian
- Donald Ellsworth Walter (born 1936), former U.S. attorney; U.S. district judge in Shreveport
- Rick Ward III (born 1982), state senator from Iberville Parish
- Henry C. Warmoth (1842–1931), governor of Louisiana during Reconstruction
- Storm Warren (born 1988), basketball player in the Israeli Basketball Premier League
- Ron Washington (born 1952), manager for the Texas Rangers
- J. Louis Watkins Jr. (1929–1997), judge; politician
- J. D. Watkins (1828–1895), state senator and judge in Webster Parish
- John T. Watkins (1854–1925), state court judge; U.S. representative for Louisiana's 4th congressional district (1905–21)
- Cedric Watson (born 1983), Creole and Cajun musician
- Muse Watson (born 1948), actor, Prison Break, NCIS
- Reggie Wayne (born 1978), wide receiver for the Indianapolis Colts
- Carl Weathers (born 1948), NFL player; actor, Apollo Creed in the Rocky films
- Blayne Weaver (born 1976), actor
- Corey Webster (born 1982), cornerback for the New York Giants
- Gus Weill (1933–2018), political consultant and author
- Carl Weiss (1906–1935), physician; purported assassin of Huey Pierce Long Jr.
- Fred Weller (born 1966), actor, In Plain Sight, Missing Persons
- Rebecca Wells (born 20th century), actress; playwright; author
- Vernon Wells (born 1978), outfielder for the New York Yankees
- Charcandrick West (born 1991), running back for the Kansas City Chiefs
- Shane West (born 1978), actor
- Lloyd F. Wheat (1923–2004), state senator from Natchitoches and Red River parishes (1948–52)
- Bodi White (born 1956), politician
- Edward Douglass White (1845–1921), chief justice of the United States
- John C. White (born 1975), Louisiana state superintendent of education (since 2012)
- Malinda Brumfield White (born 1967), state representative from Bogalusa, effective 2016
- Tony Joe White (1943–2018), singer-songwriter; musician
- Wally Whitehurst (born 1964), former MLB pitcher
- Lynn Whitfield (born 1953), actress
- Lenar Whitney (born 1959), politician
- James Wilcox (born 1949), novelist
- Jonathan Wilhite (born 1984), cornerback for the Denver Broncos
- Robert L. Wilkie (born 1962), Assistant Secretary of Defense
- Aeneas Williams (born 1968), Hall of Fame defensive back in the NFL
- A. L. Williams (born 1934), retired football coach
- Brian "Baby" Williams (born 1969), record executive; record producer; entrepreneur; musician
- Chris Williams (born 1985), offensive guard for the Chicago Bears
- Doug Williams (born 1955), NFL quarterback, led Washington Redskins to Super Bowl XXII championship
- Duke Williams (born 1990), safety for the Buffalo Bills
- Gerald Williams (born 1966), former Major League Baseball outfielder
- Hank Williams Jr. (born 1949), singer
- Kyle Williams (born 1983), defensive tackle for the Buffalo Bills
- Lucinda Williams (born 1963), singer-songwriter; musician
- Mary Bushnell Williams (1826–1891), writer, poet, translator
- T. Harry Williams (1909–1979), historian
- Tramon Williams (born 1983), cornerback for the Green Bay Packers
- Norris C. Williamson (1874–1949), politician
- Edwin E. Willis (1904–1972), US representative (1949–69)
- Tom Willmott (born 1960), state representative from Jefferson Parish (since 2008)
- Harry D. Wilson (1869–1948), Louisiana Commissioner of Agriculture and Forestry (1916–48)
- Justin E. Wilson (1914–2001), Cajun; raconteur; chef; humorist; politician
- Riley J. Wilson (1871–1946), U.S. representative
- Rush Wimberly (1873–1943), politician
- John D. Winters (1917–1998), historian
- Tommy Wiseau (born 1968), screenwriter; director; producer; executive producer; actor
- Reese Witherspoon (born 1976), Academy Award-winning actress
- A. Baldwin Wood (1879–1956), inventor; engineer
- Susan Ward (born 1976), actress; model
- Xavier Woods (born 1995), safety for the Dallas Cowboys
- J. Robert Wooley (born 1953), politician
- Orlando Woolridge (1959–2012), NBA power forward for several teams
- Zelma Wyche (1918–1999), politician; civil rights activist

== Y ==
- Andrew Young (born 1932), politician and civil rights advocate
- Faron Young (1932–1996), country singer and music producer, actor, and songwriter
- Lester Young (1909–1959), musician
- Thaddeus Young (born 1988), small forward for the Philadelphia 76ers
- YoungBoy Never Broke Again (born 1999), rapper

== Z ==
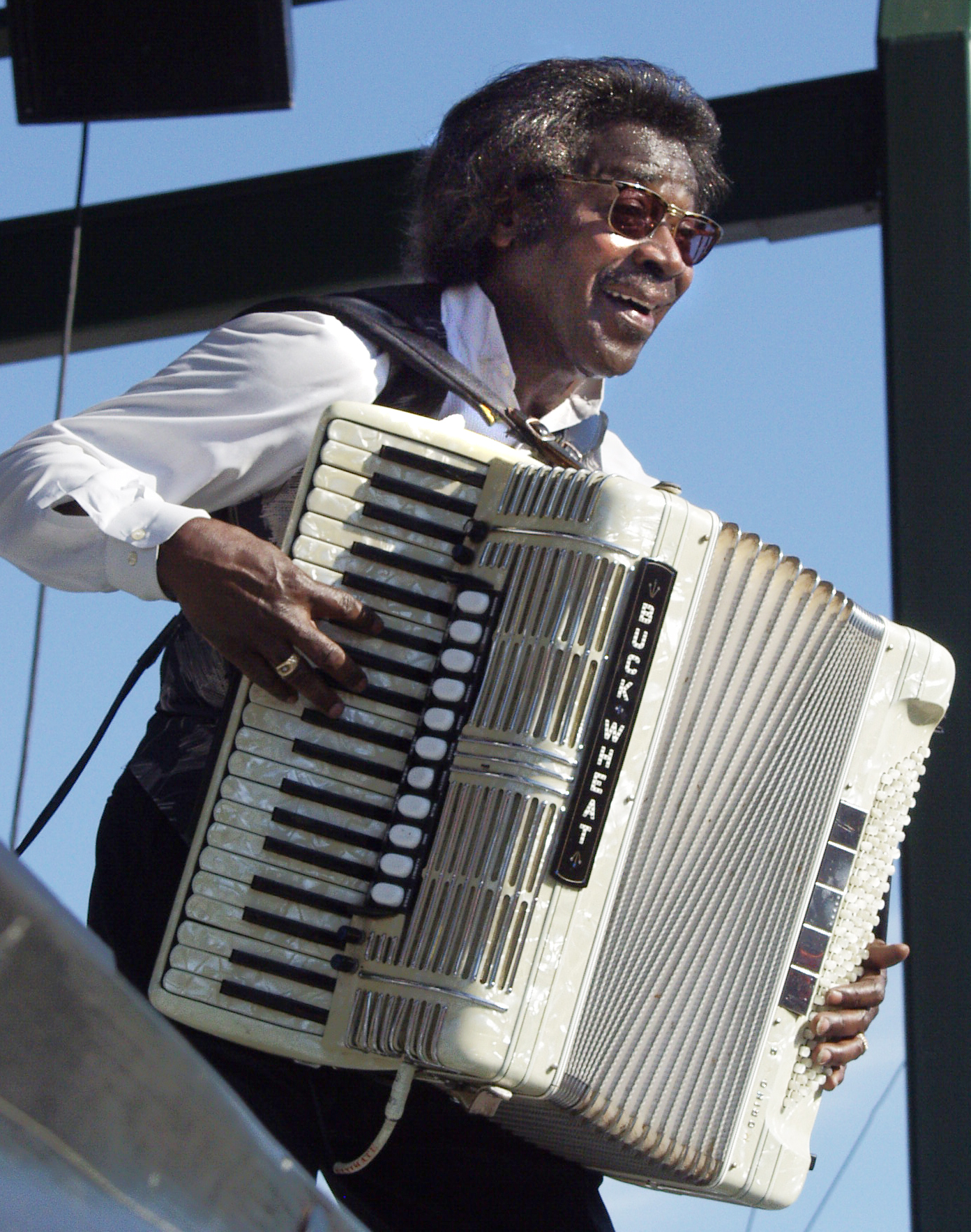
Buckwheat Zydeco

- Samuel Zemurray (1877–1961), businessman; philanthropist
- Buckwheat Zydeco (1947–2016), musician

== See also ==
- Lists of Americans
- List of people from New Orleans, Louisiana
- List of Louisiana suffragists
