= List of United States political families (J) =

The following is an alphabetical list of political families in the United States whose last name begins with J.

== Jacks and the Halls ==
- George Whitfield Jack Sr. (1875–1924), judge of the United States District Court for the Western District of Louisiana 1917 to 1924, father of Whitfield Jack and Wellborn Jack, maternal uncle of William Pike Hall Sr., great-uncle of Pike Hall Jr.
  - George Whitfield Jack Jr. (1906–1989), attorney in his native Shreveport, Louisiana; World War II colonel and postwar major general in the United States Army Reserve, son of George W. Jack, brother of Wellborn Jack, cousin of William Pike Hall Sr., and first cousin once removed from Pike Hall Jr.
  - Wellborn Jack (1907–1991), Shreveport attorney and member from 1940 to 1964 of the Louisiana House of Representatives, son of George W. Jack, brother of Whitfield Jack, cousin of William Pike Hall Sr., first cousin once removed from Pike Hall Jr.
    - Wellborn Jack Jr. (1936–2023), attorney in Shreveport, Louisiana, son of Wellborn Jack, grandson of George W. Jack, nephew of Whitfield Jack and William Pike Hall Sr., and cousin of Pike Hall Jr.
  - William Pike Hall Sr. (1896–1945), member of the Louisiana State Senate 1924–32, Shreveport lawyer, nephew of George W. Jack, cousin of Whitfield and Wellborn Jack, and father of Pike Hall Jr.
    - Pike Hall Jr. (1931–1999), Caddo Parish School Board member 1964–70, appeal court judge 1971–90, and associate justice of the Louisiana Supreme Court 1990–94, son of William Pike Hall Sr., and first cousin once removed from Whitfield and Wellborn Jack

== Jacksons ==
- Elihu E. Jackson (1836–1907), Maryland House Delegate 1882, Maryland State Senator 1884–86 1896–98, Governor of Maryland 1888–92. Brother of William Humphreys Jackson.
- William Humphreys Jackson (1839–1915), U.S. Representative from Maryland 1901–05 1907–09. Father of William P. Jackson.
  - William P. Jackson (1868–1939), Republican National Committeeman 1908–32, U.S. Senator from Maryland 1912–14, Treasurer of Maryland 1918–20. Son of William Humphreys Jackson.
    - W. Newton Jackson, Maryland Republican Committeeman 1932–50. Son of William P. Jackson.

== Jacksons and Donelsons ==
- Andrew Jackson (1767–1845), U.S. Representative from Tennessee 1796–97, U.S. Senator from Tennessee 1797–98 1823–25, member of the Tennessee Supreme Court 1798–1804, Governor of Florida 1821, President of the United States 1829–37. Uncle by marriage and adopted father of Andrew Jackson Donelson and uncle by marriage of Daniel S. Donelson.
  - Andrew Jackson Donelson (1799–1871), Charge D'Affaires to the Republic of Texas 1844–45, U.S. Minister to Prussia 1846–49, American Party candidate for vice president, 1856, delegate to the 1860 Constitutional Party National Convention. Nephew by marriage and adopted son of Andrew Jackson.
  - Daniel S. Donelson (1801–1863), Tennessee State Representative 1841–43 1855–61. Nephew by marriage of Andrew Jackson.

== Jacksons of Georgia ==
- James Jackson (1757–1806), U.S. representative, U.S. senator, Governor of Georgia.
  - Jabez Y. Jackson, U.S. representative from Georgia, son of James.
    - James Jackson (1819–1887), U.S. representative from Georgia, chief justice of the Supreme Court of Georgia, grandson of the earlier James.

== Jacksons of Illinois ==
- Rev. Jesse Jackson (1941–2026), Democratic candidate for President, 1984 and 1988; longtime activist and frequently minister without portfolio, Shadow Senator from Washington DC 1991–97
  - Jesse Jackson Jr. (born 1965), U.S. Representative from Illinois, 1995–2013
  - Sandra Jackson (born 1963), Democratic National Committeewoman, Chicago, Illinois Alderwoman 2007–2013. Wife of Jesse Jackson Jr..
  - Jonathan Jackson (born 1966), U.S. Representative from Illinois, 2023–present.

== Jacksons of Missouri ==
- Hancock Lee Jackson (1796–1876), delegate to the Missouri Constitutional Convention 1845 1846, Lieutenant Governor of Missouri 1857–61, Governor of Missouri 1857. Cousin of Claiborne Fox Jackson.
- Claiborne Fox Jackson (1806–1862), Missouri State Representative 1836 1842–48, delegate to the Missouri Constitutional Convention 1845 1846, Missouri State Senator 1848–49, Governor of Missouri 1861–62. Cousin of Hancock Lee Jackson.

NOTE: Claiborne Fox Jackson was also brother-in-law of Missouri Governor Meredith Miles Marmaduke and uncle of Missouri Governor John Sappington Marmaduke.

== Jacobs and Keys ==
- Andrew Jacobs Sr. (1906–1992), U.S. Representative from Indiana 1949–51, delegate to the Democratic National Convention 1952 1956, Criminal Court Judge in Marion County, Indiana 1975–77. Father of Andrew Jacobs Jr.
  - Andrew Jacobs Jr. (1932–2013), Indiana State Representative 1959–60, U.S. Representative from Indiana 1965–73 1975–97. Son of Andrew Jacobs.
  - Martha Keys (1930–2024), U.S. Representative from Kansas 1975–79. Wife of Andrew Jacobs Jr.

== Jacobsens ==
- Bernhard M. Jacobsen (1862–1936), Postmaster of Clinton, Iowa 1914–23; U.S. Representative from Iowa 1931–36. Father of William S. Jacobsen.
  - William S. Jacobsen (1887–1955), delegate to the Democratic National Convention 1936 1944, U.S. Representative from Iowa 1937–43. Son of Bernhard M. Jacobsen.

== Jahnckes and Stantons ==
- Edwin M. Stanton (1814–1869), Attorney General of the United States 1860–61, U.S. Secretary of War 1862–68. Grandfather-in-law of Ernest Lee Jahncke.
  - Ernest Lee Jahncke (1877–1960), delegate to the Republican National Convention 1932. Grandson-in-law of Edwin M. Stanton.

== Jameses and Whitakers ==
- Addison James (1850–1947), delegate to the Kentucky Constitutional Convention 1890, Kentucky State Representative 1891–93, Kentucky State Senator 1895, U.S. Marshal of Kentucky 1897–1905, U.S. Representative from Kentucky 1907–09. Grandfather of John A. Whitaker.
  - John A. Whitaker (1901–1951), Attorney of Logan County, Kentucky 1928–48; U.S. Representative from Kentucky 1948–51. Grandson of Addison James.

== Jays ==
- John Jay (1745–1829), Delegate to the Continental Congress from New York 1774–76 1778–79, New York State Court Judge 1777, U.S. Minister to Spain 1779–82, Chief Justice of the U.S. Supreme Court 1789–95, U.S. Secretary of State 1790, candidate for Governor of New York 1792, Governor of New York 1795–1801. Father of William Jay.
  - Peter Augustus Jay (1776–1843) New York Assemblyman 1815–16, Recorder of New York City 1819–21. Son of John Jay.
  - William Jay (1789–1858), Judge in Westchester County, New York 1820–42. Son of John Jay.
    - John Jay II (1817–1894), U.S. Minister to Austria 1869–75. Son of William Jay.
      - Peter Augustus Jay (1877–1933), U.S. General Consul to Egypt, U.S. Minister to El Salvador and Romania and U.S. Ambassador to Argentina. Great-grandson of Peter Augustus Jay.

NOTE: John Jay was also son-in-law of Continental Congressional Delegate William Livingston, brother-in-law of John Cleves Symmes and U.S. Supreme Court Justice Brockholst Livingston, nephew by marriage of New York Colony Assemblymen Robert Livingston and Peter Van Brugh Livingston and Continental Congressional Delegate Philip Livingston, and first cousin by marriage of New York Assemblyman Peter R. Livingston, Continental Congressional Delegate Walter Livingston, and New York State Senator Philip Livingston. Peter Augustus Jay was also son-in-law of New York State Senator Matthew Clarkson.

== Jayapals ==
- Susheela Jayapal (born 1962), Multnomah County Commissioner 2019–2023; candidate for the U.S. Representative from Oregon in 2024. Sister of Pramila Jayapal.
- Pramila Jayapal (born 1965), Member of the Washington Senate 2015–2016; U.S. Representative from Washington 2017–present. Sister of Susheela Jayapal.

== Jeffersons ==
- William J. Jefferson (born 1947), Louisiana State Senator 1980–91, candidate for Mayor of New Orleans, Louisiana 1982 1986; U.S. Representative from Louisiana 1991–2009; candidate for Governor of Louisiana 1999; delegate to the Democratic National Convention 2000 2004 2008. Father of Jalila Jefferson-Bullock.
  - Jalila Jefferson-Bullock, Louisiana State Representative, delegate to the Democratic National Convention 2004, candidate for Louisiana State Senate 2007. Daughter of William J. Jefferson.

== Jeffersons and Randolphs ==
- Peyton Randolph (1721–1775), member of the Continental Congress 1774 1775. First cousin once removed of Thomas Jefferson.
  - Thomas Jefferson (1743–1826), author of the Declaration of Independence USA, one of the founding fathers of the United States. member of the Virginia House of Burgesses 1774–76, member of the Continental Congress 1776, member of the Virginia House of Delegates 1776–79, Governor of Virginia 1779–81, U.S. Minister to France 1785–89, U.S. Secretary of State 1789–93, Vice President of the United States 1797–1801, President of the United States 1801–09. First cousin once removed of Peyton Randolph, father-in-law of Thomas Mann Randolph Jr..
    - John Wayles Eppes (1773–1823), Virginia House Delegate 1801–03, U.S. Representative from Virginia 1803–11 1813–15, U.S. Senator from Virginia 1817–19. Son-in-law of Thomas Jefferson.
    - Thomas Mann Randolph Jr. (1768–1728), Virginia State Senator 1793–94, U.S. Representative from Virginia 1803–07, Governor of Virginia 1819–22. Son-in-law of Thomas Jefferson.
      - Dabney S. Carr (1802–1854), U.S. Minister to Turkey 1843–49. Grandnephew of Thomas Jefferson.
      - Meriwether Lewis Randolph (1810–1837), Secretary of the Arkansas Territory 1835–36. Son of Thomas Mann Randolph Jr.
      - Thomas Jefferson Randolph (1792–1875), Chairman of the 1872 Democratic National Convention. Son of Thomas Mann Randolph Jr..
      - George W. Randolph (1818–1867), Confederate States Secretary of War 1862. Grandson of Thomas Jefferson.
      - Nicholas Philip Trist (1800–1874), U.S. Consul in Havana, Cuba 1833–41; U.S. Diplomatic Agent to Cuba 1834. Son-in-law of Thomas Mann Randolph Jr.
        - T. Jefferson Coolidge (1831–1920), U.S. Minister to France 1892–93. Grandson of Thomas Mann Randolph Jr.
        - Frederick Madison Roberts (1879–1952), California Assemblyman 1919–34, candidate for U.S. Representative from California 1946. Great-grandson of Thomas Jefferson.
          - Lloyd L. Gravely, Mayor of Rocky Mount, North Carolina 1925–28; North Carolina State Senator 1929–32 1935. Descendant of Thomas Jefferson.

NOTE: Thomas Jefferson was also third cousin of U.S. Secretary of State John Marshall and second cousin once removed of U.S. Senator William Segar Archer. Dabney S. Carr was also nephew of U.S. Court of Appeals Judge Dabney Carr. T. Jefferson Coolidge was also son-in-law of U.S. Representative William Appleton. Lloyd L. Gravely was also descendant of Continental Congressional Delegate Patrick Henry.

== Jeffords ==
- Olin M. Jeffords (1890–1964), Chief Justice of the Vermont Supreme Court. Father of James M. Jeffords.
  - James M. Jeffords (1934–2014), Vermont State Senator 1967–68, Attorney General of Vermont 1969–73, candidate for Governor of Vermont 1972, U.S. Representative from Vermont 1975–89, U.S. Senator from Vermont 1989–2007. Son of Olin M. Jeffords.

== Jenifers and Campbells ==
- Daniel of St. Thomas Jenifer (1723–1790), Justice of the Peace in Charles County, Maryland; Maryland Governor's Councilman; Maryland State Senator 1777–81; Delegate to the Continental Congress from Maryland 1788–82; candidate for Governor of Maryland 1782 1785. Uncle of Daniel Jenifer.
- John Campbell (1765–1828), Maryland House Delegate 1792, Maryland State Senator 1792–1800, U.S. Representative from Maryland 1801–11. Father-in-law of Daniel Jenifer.
  - Daniel Jenifer (1791–1855), U.S. Representative from Maryland 1831–33 1835–41. Nephew of Daniel of St. Thomas Jenifer.

== Jenkins ==
- Lemuel Jenkins (1789–1862), U.S. Representative from New York 1823–25. Father of Charles E. Jenkins.
  - Charles E. Jenkins, Wisconsin State Assemblyman 1850–51, Milwaukee County, Wisconsin Judge 1854–56; New York State Assemblyman 1866. Son of Lemuel Jenkins.

== Jesters ==
- George T. Jester (1846–1922), Texas State Representative 1891–92, Texas State Senator 1893–94, Lieutenant Governor of Texas 1895–98. Father of Beauford H. Jester.
  - Beauford H. Jester (1893–1949), Governor of Texas 1947–49, delegate to the Democratic National Convention 1948. Son of George T. Jester.

== Jewetts ==
- Joshua Jewett (1815–1861), Prosecuting Attorney of Hardin County, Kentucky; U.S. Representative from Kentucky 1855–59. Brother of Hugh J. Jewett.
- Hugh J. Jewett (1817–1898), Ohio State Senator 1853, U.S. Attorney in Ohio 1854, Ohio State Representative 1855 1868–69, candidate for Governor of Ohio 1861, candidate for U.S. Senate from Ohio 1863, U.S. Representative from Ohio 1873–74. Brother of Joshua Jewett.

== Johns and Smiths ==
- John N. John Jr., Louisiana State Representative 1974–82. Father of Christopher C. John.
- John Smith, member of Louisiana Legislature. Father-in-law of Christopher C. John.
  - Christopher C. John (born 1960), Crowley, Louisiana Alderman 1984–88; Louisiana State Representative 1988–96; candidate for Lieutenant Governor of Louisiana 1995; U.S. Representative from Louisiana 1997–2005. Son of John N. John Jr.

== Johnses and Van Dykes ==
- Nicholas Van Dyke (1738–1789), delegate to the Delaware Constitutional Convention 1776, Delaware State Senator 1776–78, Delegate to the Continental Congress from Delaware 1777–82, President of Delaware 1783–86. Father of Nicholas Van Dyke.
  - Nicholas Van Dyke (1770–1826), Delaware State Representative 1799, U.S. Representative from Delaware 1807–11, Attorney General of Delaware, Delaware State Senator 1816–17, U.S. Senator from Delaware 1817–26. Son of Nicholas Van Dyke.
  - Kensey Johns (1759–1848), Justice of the Delaware Supreme Court, delegate to the Delaware Constitutional Convention 1792. Son-in-law of Nicholas Van Dyke.
    - Kensey Johns Jr. (1791–1857), U.S. Representative from Delaware 1827–31, Chancellor of Delaware 1832–57. Son of Kensey Johns.

== Johnsons ==
- James Johnson (1774–1826), Kentucky State Senator 1808, Kentucky Presidential elector 1820, U.S. Representative from Kentucky 1825–26. Brother of Richard M. Johnson and John T. Johnson.
- Richard M. Johnson (1780–1850), Kentucky State Representative 1804–06 1819 1850, U.S. Representative from Kentucky 1807–19 1829–37, U.S. Senator from Kentucky 1819–29, Vice President of the United States 1837–41. Brother of James Johnson and John T. Johnson.
- John T. Johnson (1788–1856), U.S. Representative from Kentucky 1821–25, Judge of the Court of Appeals 1826. Brother of James Johnson and Richard M. Johnson.
  - Robert W. Johnson (1814–1879), U.S. Representative from Arkansas 1847–53, U.S. Senator from Arkansas 1853–61, Confederate States Representative from Arkansas 1861, Confederate States Senator from Arkansas 1862–65. Nephew of James Johnson, Richard M. Johnson, and John T. Johnson.

NOTE: Robert W. Johnson was also brother-in-law of U.S. Senator Ambrose Sevier.

== Johnsons of Alabama ==
- Frank M. Johnson, delegate to the Republican National Convention 1936 1940, Alabama State Representative. Father of Frank Minis Johnson.
  - Frank Minis Johnson (1918–1999), delegate to the Republican National Convention 1948, U.S. Attorney in Alabama 1953–55, U.S. District Court Judge in Alabama 1955–79, Judge of the U.S. Court of Appeals 1979–92. Son of Frank M. Johnson.

== Johnsons of California ==
- Grove L. Johnson (1841–1926), California Assemblyman 1878–79 1901–03 1907–09, California State Senator 1880–82, delegate to the California Republican Convention 1884 1888 1892 1908, delegate to the Republican National Convention 1896, U.S. Representative from California 1895–97, Receiver of Public Moneys in California 1921–25. Father of Hiram Johnson.
  - Hiram Johnson (1866–1945), Governor of California 1911–17, candidate for Vice President of the United States 1912, U.S. Senator from California 1917–45, candidate for Republican nominations for President of the United States 1920 1924. Son of Grove L. Johnson.

== Johnsons of Kentucky and Minnesota ==
- James Leeper Johnson (1818–1877), Kentucky State Representative 1844, U.S. Representative from Kentucky 1849–51, candidate for U.S. Representative from Kentucky 1857, Circuit Court Judge in Kentucky 1867. Brother of Richard W. Johnson.
- Richard W. Johnson (1827–1897), candidate for Governor of Minnesota 1881. Brother of James Leeper Johnson.

NOTE: Richard W. Johnson was also son-in-law of Pennsylvania State Representative James Steele and brother-in-law of U.S. Congressional Delegate Henry Hastings Sibley.

== Johnsons of Mississippi ==
- Paul B. Johnson Sr. (1880–1943), Judge in Hattiesburg, Mississippi 1907–08; Circuit Judge in Mississippi; U.S. Representative from Mississippi 1919–23; delegate to the Democratic National Convention 1940; Governor of Mississippi 1940–43. Father of Paul B. Johnson Jr.
  - Paul B. Johnson Jr. (1916–1985), candidate for U.S. Senate from Mississippi 1947, Lieutenant Governor of Mississippi 1960–64, Governor of Mississippi 1864–68. Son of Paul B. Johnson Sr. Uncle of Pete Johnson.
    - Pete Johnson (1948–2025), State Auditor of Mississippi 1988–1992. Grandson of Paul B. Johnson Sr.

== Johnsons of Missouri and Virginia ==
- Joseph Johnson (1785–1877), Virginia House Delegate 1815–16 1818–22 1847–48, U.S. Representative from Virginia 1823 – 27 1833 1835–41 1845–47, delegate to the Democratic National Convention 1844, delegate to the Virginia Constitutional Convention 1850 1851, Governor of Virginia 1851–55. Uncle of Waldo P. Johnson.
  - Waldo P. Johnson (1817–1885), Missouri State Representative, Circuit Attorney in Missouri, Circuit Judge in Missouri 1851–52, U.S. Senator from Missouri 1861–62, Confederate States Senator from Missouri 1863–65, President of the Missouri Constitutional Convention 1875. Nephew of Joseph Johnson.

== Johnsons of Oklahoma ==
- Jed Johnson (1888–1963), Oklahoma State Senator 1920–27, U.S. Representative from Oklahoma 1927–47, Judge of the U.S. Customs Court 1947–63. Father of Jed Johnson Jr.
  - Jed Johnson Jr. (1939–1993), U.S. Representative from Oklahoma 1965–67. Son of Jed Johnson.

== Johnsons and Pattersons ==
- Andrew Johnson (1808–1875), Alderman of Greeneville, Tennessee 1828–30, Mayor of Greenevill, Tennessee 1830–33, member of the Tennessee House of Representatives 1835–39, Tennessee State Senator 1839–43, U.S. Representative from Tennessee 1843–53, Governor of Tennessee 1853–57 1862–65, U.S. Senator from Tennessee 1857–62, Vice President of the United States 1865, President of the United States 1865–69. Father-in-law of David T. Patterson.
  - David T. Patterson (1818–1891), Circuit Court Judge in Tennessee 1854–63, U.S. Senator from Tennessee 1866–69. Son-in-law of Andrew Johnson.

== Johnsons, Robbs, and Baines ==
- Joseph Wilson Baines (1846–1906), Texas State Representative. Father-in-law of Samuel Ealy Johnson Jr.
  - Samuel Ealy Johnson Jr. (1877–1937), Texas State Representative 1905–09 1918–23. Son-in-law of Joseph Wilson Baines.
    - Lyndon B. Johnson (1908–1973), U.S. Representative from Texas, 1937–41 and 1942–49; U.S. Senator from Texas, 1948–61; Senate Majority Leader, 1954–61; Vice President, 1961–63; 36th President, 1963–69; son of Samuel Ealy Johnson Jr.
      - Charles S. Robb (born 1939), Governor of Virginia, 1982–86; U.S. Senator from Virginia, 1989–2001; co-chair of the Iraq Intelligence Commission, 2004; son-in-law of Lyndon Johnson.

== Johnsons and Roberts ==
- Edwin E. Roberts (1870–1933), U.S. Representative from Nevada 1911–19, delegate to the Republican National Convention 1912, candidate for U.S. Senate from Nevada 1918, Mayor of Reno, Nevada. Father-in-law of Walter Johnson.
  - Walter Johnson (1887–1946), National Baseball Hall of Fame pitcher, candidate for U.S. Representative from Maryland 1940. Son-in-law of Edwin E. Roberts.

== Johnstons ==
- Gabriel Johnston (1699–1752), Governor of North Carolina Colony 1734–52. Brother of Samuel Johnston Sr..
- Samuel Johnston Sr., Surveyor-general of North Carolina Colony. Brother of Gabriel Johnston.
  - Samuel Johnston (1733–1816), North Carolina Colony Assemblyman 1760–75, member of the North Carolina Colony Committee of Correspondence 1773, North Carolina Colony Congressman 1774–76, North Carolina State Senator 1779 1783–84, Delegate to the Continental Congress from North Carolina 1780–81, Governor of North Carolina 1787–89, U.S. Senator from North Carolina 1789–93. Son of Samuel Johnston Sr.
  - James Iredell (1751–1799), Justice of the U.S. Supreme Court 1790–99. Son-in-law of Samuel Johnston Sr.
    - James Iredell Jr. (1788–1853), member of the North Carolina House of Commons 1813 1816–28, North Carolina Superior Court Judge 1819, Governor of North Carolina 1827–28, U.S. Senator from North Carolina 1828–31. Son of James Iredell.

== Johnstons of Alabama ==
- Joseph F. Johnston (1843–1913), Governor of Alabama 1896–1900, U.S. Senator from Alabama 1907–13. Father of Forney Johnston.
  - Forney Johnston, delegate to the Democratic National Convention 1924. Son of Joseph F. Johnston.

== Johnstons of Virginia ==
- Charles Clement Johnston (1795–1832), U.S. Representative from Virginia 1831–32. Brother of Joseph E. Johnston.
- Joseph E. Johnston (1807–1891), U.S. Representative from Virginia 1879–81. Brother of Charles Clement Johnston.
  - John W. Johnston (1818–1889), Virginia State Senator 1846, Virginia State Court Judge 1866, U.S. Senator from Virginia 1870–71 1871–83. Nephew of Charles Clement Johnston and Joseph E. Johnston.
    - Henry Bowen (1841–1915), member of the Virginia Legislature, U.S. Representative from Virginia 1883–85 1887–89. Nephew of John W. Johnston.

NOTE: Henry Bowen was also son of U.S. Representative Rees Tate Bowen and cousin of U.S. Representative William B. Campbell.

== Johnstons and Keenans ==
- William Freame Johnston (1808–1872), Governor of Pennsylvania 1848–52. Uncle by marriage of James Keenan.
  - James Keenan (1823–1862), U.S. Consul in Hong Kong, China 1853–62. Nephew by marriage of William Freame Johnston.

NOTE: James Keenan was also nephew of U.S. Consul Hugh Keenan.

== Johnstons and Pattersons ==
- Olin D. Johnston (1896–1965), South Carolina State Representative 1923–24 1927–30, candidate for Democratic nomination for Governor of South Carolina 1930, Governor of South Carolina 1935–39 1943–45, candidate for U.S. Senate from South Carolina 1938 1941, U.S. Senator from South Carolina 1945–65. Father of Elizabeth J. Patterson.
  - Elizabeth J. Patterson (1939–2018), Spartanburg, South Carolina Councilwoman 1975–76; South Carolina State Senator 1979–86; U.S. Representative from South Carolina 1987–93. Daughter of Olin D. Johnston.

== Johnstons and Roemers ==
- Bennett Johnston Jr. (born 1932), Louisiana State Representative 1964–68, Louisiana State Senator 1868–1972, candidate for the Democratic nomination for Governor of Louisiana 1971, U.S. Senator from Louisiana 1972–97. Father-in-law of Timothy J. Roemer.
  - Timothy J. Roemer (born 1956), U.S. Representative from Indiana 1991–2003, delegate to the Democratic National Convention 2000. Son-in-law of Bennett Johnston Jr.

== Johnstons and Russells ==
- Benjamin E. Russell (1845–1909), delegate to the Georgia Constitutional Convention 1877, delegate to the Democratic National Convention 1880, Mayor of Bainbridge, Georgia 1881–82; Georgia State Representative 1882–83; U.S. Representative from Georgia 1893–97. Cousin of Rienzi Johnston.
- Rienzi Johnston (1849–1926), U.S. Senator from Texas 1913, Texas State Senator 1916. Cousin of Benjamin E. Russell.

== Jonases ==
- Charles A. Jonas (1876–1955), Postmaster of Lincolnton, North Carolina 1907–10; Attorney of Lincolnton, North Carolina 1908–12; North Carolina State Senator 1915–19; delegate to the Republican National Convention 1916 1932 1936; North Carolina State Representative 1927–29 1935–37; Republican National Committeeman; U.S. Representative from North Carolina 1929–31; U.S. Attorney in North Carolina 1931–32; candidate for U.S. Senate from North Carolina 1938; candidate for U.S. Representative from North Carolina 1942. Father of Charles R. Jonas.
  - Charles R. Jonas (1904–1988), delegate to the Republican National Convention 1952, U.S. Representative from North Carolina 1953–73. Son of Charles A. Jonas.

== Jonases and Meyers ==
- Benjamin F. Jonas (1834–1911), Louisiana State Representative 1865, U.S. Senator from Louisiana 1879–85. Brother-in-law of Adolph Meyer.
- Adolph Meyer (1842–1908), U.S. Representative from Louisiana 1891–1908. Brother-in-law of Benjamin F. Jonas.

== Joneses of North Carolina ==
- Walter B. Jones Sr. (1913–1992), North Carolina Assemblyman 1955–59, North Carolina State Senator 1965, U.S. Representative from North Carolina 1966–92. Father of Walter B. Jones.
  - Walter B. Jones Jr. (1943–2019), North Carolina State Representative 1983–92, candidate for Democratic nomination for U.S. Representative from North Carolina 1992, U.S. Representative from North Carolina 1995–2019. Son of Walter B. Jones Sr.

== Joneses of Alabama ==
- Thomas G. Jones (1844–1914), candidate for Montgomery, Alabama Alderman 1869; Montgomery, Alabama Alderman 1875–84; Alabama State Representative; Governor of Alabama 1890–94. Father of Walter Burgwyn Jones.
  - Walter Burgwyn Jones (1888–1963), Alabama State Representative 1919–20, Alabama Circuit Court Judge 1920–63. Son of Thomas G. Jones.

== Joneses of Georgia ==
- Noble Jones (1702–1775), one of the first settlers and leading officials of the Province of Georgia, father of Noble Wimberly Jones.
  - Noble Wimberly Jones (1723–1805), Colonial Assemblyman from Georgia 1755 1756 1760–62 1764 1768 1769 1771 1772, Georgia State Representative 1777–78 1783, Delegate to the Continental Congress from Georgia 1781–82, President of the Georgia Constitutional Convention 1795. Father of George Jones.
    - George Jones (1766–1838), Georgia State Representative, Georgia State Senator, Savannah, Georgia Alderman 1793–94 1802–03 1814–15; Mayor of Savannah, Georgia 1812–14; U.S. Senator from Georgia 1807. Son of Noble Jones.

== Joneses of Louisiana ==
- Sam H. Jones (1897–1978), Governor of Louisiana 1940–44, candidate for Democratic nomination for Governor of Louisiana 1948. Father of Robert G. Jones and step-father of William Edwin Boyer.
  - Robert G. Jones (born 1939), Louisiana State Representative 1968–72, Louisiana State Senator 1972–76, candidate for Democratic nomination for Governor of Louisiana 1975. Son of Sam H. Jones and half-brother of William Edwin Boyer.
  - William Edwin "Bill" Boyer (c. 1931 – 1999), mayor of Lake Charles, Louisiana, from 1974 to 1981, stepson of Sam H. Jones and half-brother of Robert G. Jones

== Joneses of West Virginia ==
- E. Bartow Jones, Chairman of the Mason County, West Virginia Republican Party 1940–45; candidate for West Virginia Commissioner of Agriculture 1944; West Virginia State Senator 1949–56. Father of Brereton Jones and B. Ned Jones.
  - Brereton Jones (1939–2023), West Virginia House Delegate 1965–68, Lieutenant Governor of Kentucky 1987–91, Governor of Kentucky 1991–95. Son of E. Bartow Jones.
  - B. Ned Jones (born 1944), West Virginia State Senator 1985–94. Son of E. Bartow Jones.

== Joneses, Links, and Halls ==
- John Winston Jones (1791–1848), Prosecuting Attorney in Virginia, U.S. Representative from Virginia 1835–45, Speaker of the U.S. House of Representatives 1843–45, Virginia House Delegate. Great-grandfather-in-law of Albert Link.
- Harvey Link (1824–1906), Nebraska Territory Representative 1867. Father-in-law of P.L. Hall.
  - P.L. Hall (1850–1923), Chairman of the Nebraska Democratic Party 1898–1904, Democratic National Committeeman 1908–12. Son-in-law of Harvey Link.
    - Albert Link, New York Assemblyman 1918–19. Second cousin thrice removed of Harvey Link.
    - D.D. Link, Chairman of the Jefferson County, West Virginia Republican Party 1942. Second cousin thrice removed of Harvey Link.

== Joneses and Monroes ==
- Joseph Jones (1727–1805), Delegate to the Continental Congress from Virginia 1777 1780–83. Uncle of James Monroe.
  - James Monroe (1758–1831), U.S. Senator from Virginia 1790–94, U.S. Minister to France 1794–96, Governor of Virginia 1799–1802 1811, U.S. Minister to Great Britain 1803–07, U.S. Secretary of State 1811–14 1815–17, U.S. Secretary of War 1814–15, acting U.S. Secretary of State 1814–15, President of the United States 1817–25. Nephew of Joseph Jones.
  - Thomas B. Monroe (1791–1865), Kentucky State Representative 1816, Kentucky Secretary of State 1823–24, U.S. District Attorney of Kentucky 1833–34, Judge of U.S. District Court of Kentucky 1834–61, Confederate States Provisional Congress Delegate 1861–62. Cousin of James Monroe.
    - James Monroe (1799–1870), New York City Alderman 1833–35, U.S. Representative from New York 1839–41, New York State Senator 1850–52. Nephew of James Monroe.
      - Theodore Douglas Robinson (1883–1934), New York Assemblyman 1912, New York State Senator. Great-grandson of James Monroe.
      - Corinne Alsop Cole (1886–1971), Connecticut State Representative 1925, delegate to the Republican National Convention 1936, Connecticut Republican Committeewoman 1940. Great-granddaughter of James Monroe.
      - Joseph Wright Alsop (1876–1953), Connecticut State Representative 1907–09, Connecticut State Senator 1909–13, Connecticut Republican Committeeman 1909–12. Husband of Corinne Alsop Cole.
        - John Alsop (1915–2000), Connecticut State Representative 1947–49, delegate to the Republican National Convention 1952 1960 1972, candidate for Governor of Connecticut. Son of Corinne Alsop Cole and Joseph Wright Alsop.

NOTE: Theodore D. Robinson and Corinne Alsop Cole were also nephew and niece of U.S. President Theodore Roosevelt. Cole was also first cousin by marriage of U.S. President Franklin D. Roosevelt. Joseph Wright Alsop was also son of Connecticut State Senator Joseph W. Alsop.

== Joneses and Rayburns ==
- Samuel T. Rayburn (1882–1961), Texas 1907–13, U.S. Representative from Texas 1913–61, delegate to the Democratic National Convention 1936 1940 1944 1948, Speaker of the U.S. House of Representatives 1940–47 1949–53 1955–61. Former brother-in-law of John Marvin Jones.
- John Marvin Jones (1886–1976), U.S. Representative from Texas 1917–40, Judge of the U.S. Court of Claims 1940–47, Chief Judge of the U.S. Court of Claims 1947–64. Former brother-in-law of Samuel T. Rayburn.

== Joneses and Scotts ==
- John Rice Jones, Attorney General of Indiana Territory, member of the Missouri Territory Legislature 1814, delegate to the Missouri Constitutional Convention 1820, Justice of the Missouri Supreme Court 1820–24. Father George W. Jones and Myers F. Jones.
  - George Wallace Jones (1804–1896), U.S. Congressional Delegate from the Michigan Territory 1835–36, U.S. Congressional Delegate from Wisconsin Territory 1836–39, Surveyor of Wisconsin Territory 1840–48, Surveyor of Iowa Territory 1840–48, U.S. Senator from Iowa 1848–59, U.S. Minister to New Granada 1859–61. Son of John Rice Jones.
  - Myers F. Jones, member of the Missouri Legislature. Son of John Rice Jones.
  - John Scott (1785–1861), U.S. Congressional Delegate from Missouri Territory 1816–17 1817–21, U.S. Representative from Missouri 1821–27. Brother-in-law of George W. Jones.
  - Andrew Scott (1789–1841), Justice of Arkansas Territory Supreme Court 1819–25, Arkansas Territory Representative 1831. Brother-in-law of George W. Jones.
    - John R. Homer Scott, Arkansas State Senator 1873, delegate to the Arkansas Constitutional Convention 1874, Chairman of the Arkansas Democratic Party 1878. Son of Andrew Scott.
    - J. Russel Jones (1823–1909), Illinois State Representative 1860, delegate to the Republican National Convention 1868, Republican National Committeeman 1868–70, U.S. Minister to Belgium 1869–75, U.S. Collector of Customs of Chicago, Illinois 1875–76. Son-in-law of Andrew Scott.

NOTE: John Rice Jones was also father of Texas Republic politician John Rice Jones Jr.

== Jumonvilles ==
- J. E. Jumonville Sr., Democratic member of the Louisiana State Senate from Pointe Coupee Parish from 1968 to 1976, father of J. E. Jumonville Jr.
  - J. E. Jumonville Jr., Democratic member of the Louisiana State Senate from Pointe Coupee Parish from 1976 to 1992, son of J. E. Jumonville Jr.
