= List of Tulane University Law School alumni =

Following is a list of notable alumni of the Tulane University Law School.

== Academia ==
- Winston Chang, 1992–1996 former president of Soochow University (Taiwan); former chairman, Soochow University College of Law
- Twinette Johnson, dean of the David A. Clarke School of Law
- Judith Kelleher Schafer (1942–2014), historian

== Business ==
- Dean Lombardi, JD, president and general manager of the Los Angeles Kings, specialized in labor law
- Terry O'Neill, president of the National Organization for Women (NOW)
- Peter Schloss, JD 1985, CEO of Broadwebasia
- Mike Tannenbaum, JD 1995, former general manager of the New York Jets, graduated with Tulane's Sports Law certificate

== Government and diplomacy ==
- Donald Ensenat, 1973, former chief of Protocol of the United States
- Stephen Douglas Johnson, J.D., 1988; chief counsel, U.S. House of Representatives Subcommittee, Financial Institutions and Consumer Credit, 1995–1997; Bush White House senior advisor, office of Federal Housing Oversight, 2001–2003; Washington, D.C. whistle blower
- Clint Williamson, 1986, US ambassador, United Nations envoy, and international war crimes prosecutor

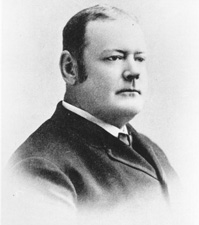
Edward Douglass White, former chief justice of the United States

== Judiciary ==
- Nancy Abudu, 1974, U.S. Court of Appeals for the Eleventh Circuit
- Peter Beer, 1952, U.S. District Court for the Eastern District of Louisiana
- Nannette Jolivette Brown, 1963, United States District Court, Eastern District of Louisiana
- Patricia E. Campbell-Smith, 1992, United States Court of Federal Claims
- Edith Brown Clement, JD 1972, U.S. Court of Appeals for the Fifth Circuit (R)
- W. Eugene Davis, 1936, U.S. Court of Appeals for the Fifth Circuit
- Jimmy Dimos, JD 1963, judge of 4th Judicial District of Louisiana, 1999–2006, former member and speaker of the Louisiana House of Representatives (D)
- John Allen Dixon Jr. (LL.B., 1947), chief justice of the Louisiana Supreme Court
- Dee D. Drell, 1947, United States District Court, Western District of Louisiana
- John M. Duhé Jr., 1957, U.S. Court of Appeals for the Fifth Circuit (R)
- Eldon E. Fallon, 1939, United States District Court, Eastern District of Louisiana
- Martin Feldman, 1957, United States District Court, Eastern District of Louisiana
- Rufus Edward Foster, LL.B. 1895, U.S. Court of Appeals for the Fifth Circuit; 11th dean of the Tulane Law School
- Madeline Haikala, 1964, United States District Court, Northern District of Alabama
- George W. Jack, 1898; Judge of the United States District Court for the Western District of Louisiana 1917–1924, based in Shreveport (D)
- Yvette Kane, 1953, United States District Court, Middle District of Pennsylvania
- F. A. Little Jr., J.D., 1961; retired judge of the United States District Court for the Western District of Louisiana (R)
- Ángel Martín, 1953, former associate justice of the Puerto Rico Supreme Court
- Tucker L. Melancon, 1946, United States District Court, Western District of Louisiana
- Patricia Head Minaldi, 1959, United States District Court, Western District of Louisiana
- Harold A. Moise, 1902, associate justice of the Louisiana Supreme Court, 1948–1958
- Andrew G. T. Moore II, Delaware Supreme Court and founded the Tulane Corporate Law Institute
- Walter Nixon, 1951, impeached federal judge, subject of Nixon v. United States
- William Wiley Norris, III (1936–2016), city, district, and circuit court judge from West Monroe
- William H. Pryor Jr., JD 1987, U.S. Court of Appeals for the Eleventh Circuit; former Attorney General of Alabama
- L. Felipe Restrepo, 1959, U.S. Court of Appeals for the Third Circuit
- Wynne Grey Rogers, Louisiana Supreme Court
- Eleni M. Roumel, 2000, United States Court of Federal Claims
- James D. Simon, 1918, Louisiana Supreme Court
- Sarah S. Vance, 1950, United States District Court, Eastern District of Louisiana
- Jeffrey P. Victory, 1971, associate justice of the Louisiana Supreme Court
- Elizabeth Weaver, 1965, Michigan Supreme Court
- Edward Douglass White, 1868, chief justice of the United States
- Jacques L. Wiener Jr., 1961, U.S. Court of Appeals for the Fifth Circuit
- John Minor Wisdom, 1929, U.S. Court of Appeals for the Fifth Circuit, received the Presidential Medal of Freedom in 1993

== Law ==
- Dean Andrews Jr. (1922–1981), American attorney involved in the JFK assassination investigation
- Jim Garrison, 1949, New Orleans district attorney (D), played by Kevin Costner in the Oliver Stone film JFK
- Bolivar Edwards Kemp Jr., 1897, Louisiana state attorney general 1948–1952
- Philip H. Mecom, J.D. former United States attorney for the district of western Louisiana
- Jefferson B. Snyder, district attorney in Madison Parish (D)

== Literature ==
- Jan Crull Jr., J.D., 1990, filmmaker, Native American rights advocate, attorney, and investment banker
- Whitney Gaskell née Kelly, 1997, novelist
- Robert Harling, movie screenwriter, producer and director
- Jonathan Hensleigh, JD 1985, writer of Die Hard with a Vengeance (1995), Jumanji (1995), and Armageddon (1998)

== Military ==
- Whitfield Jack, attended 1930; Shreveport lawyer and officer of the United States Army in World War II and United States Army Reserve, 1946–1966 (D)

== Politics ==
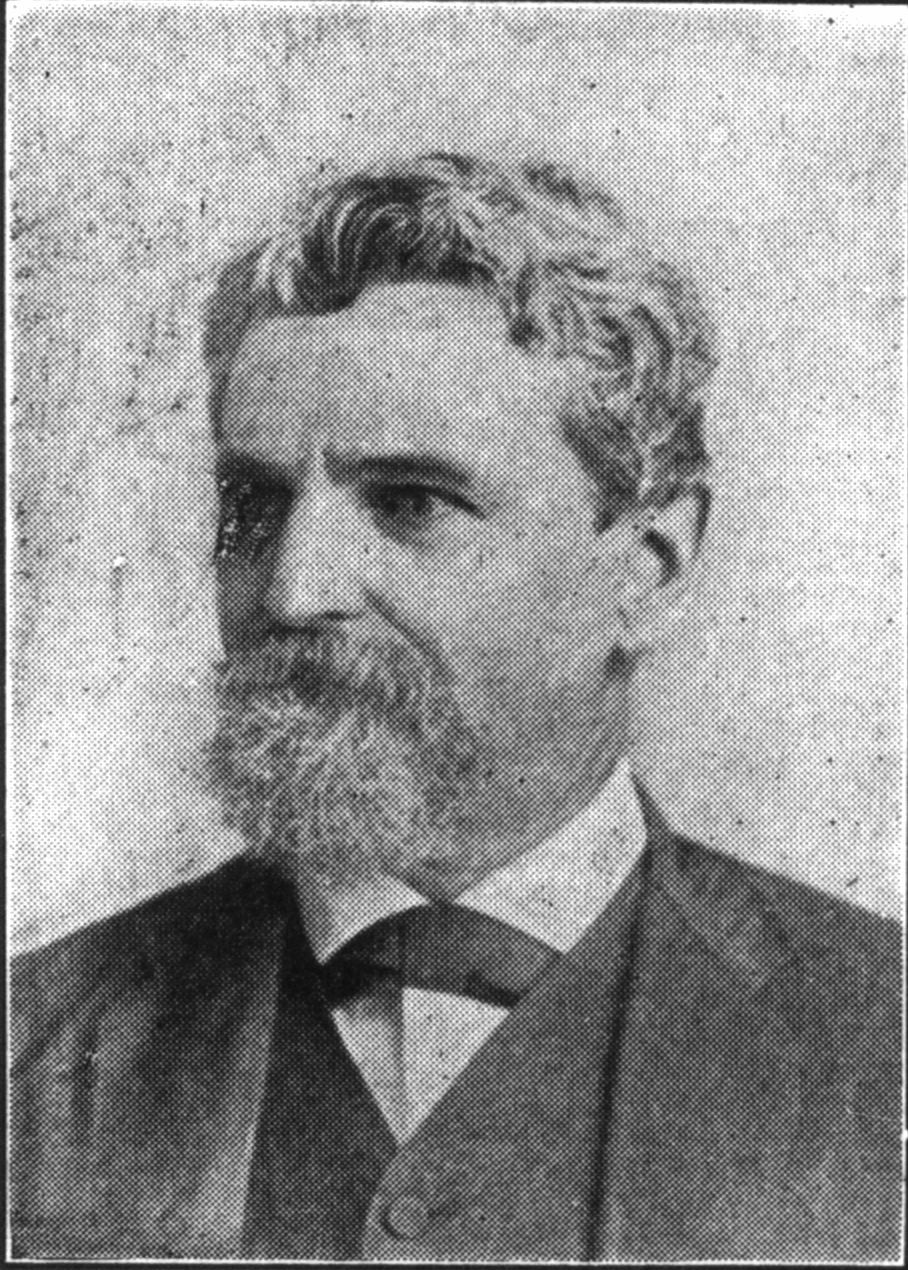
Francis T. Nicholls

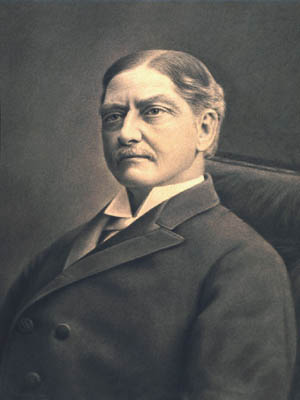
Newton Crain Blanchard

=== Governors ===
- Newton C. Blanchard, 1870, governor of Louisiana (D)
- Murphy J. Foster, 1871, governor of Louisiana (D)
- Alvin Olin King, governor of Louisiana (D)
- Huey Long, 1915, governor of Louisiana (D)
- Francis T. Nicholls, governor of Louisiana (D)
- Jared Y. Sanders Sr., 1893, governor of Louisiana (D)
- Oramel H. Simpson, 1893, governor of Louisiana (D)
- David C. Treen, 1950, governor of Louisiana (R)
- Bob Wise, 1975, governor of West Virginia (D)

=== U.S. senators ===
- Edwin S. Broussard, 1901, U.S. senator (D)
- Robert F. Broussard, 1889, U.S. senator (D)
- Allen J. Ellender, 1913, U.S. senator (D)
- Randall Lee Gibson, U.S. senator (D), whom Gibson Hall is named after
- John H. Overton, 1897, U.S. senator (D)
- Luther Strange, 1979, U.S. senator (R)
- David Vitter, 1988, U.S. senator (R)

=== U.S. representatives ===
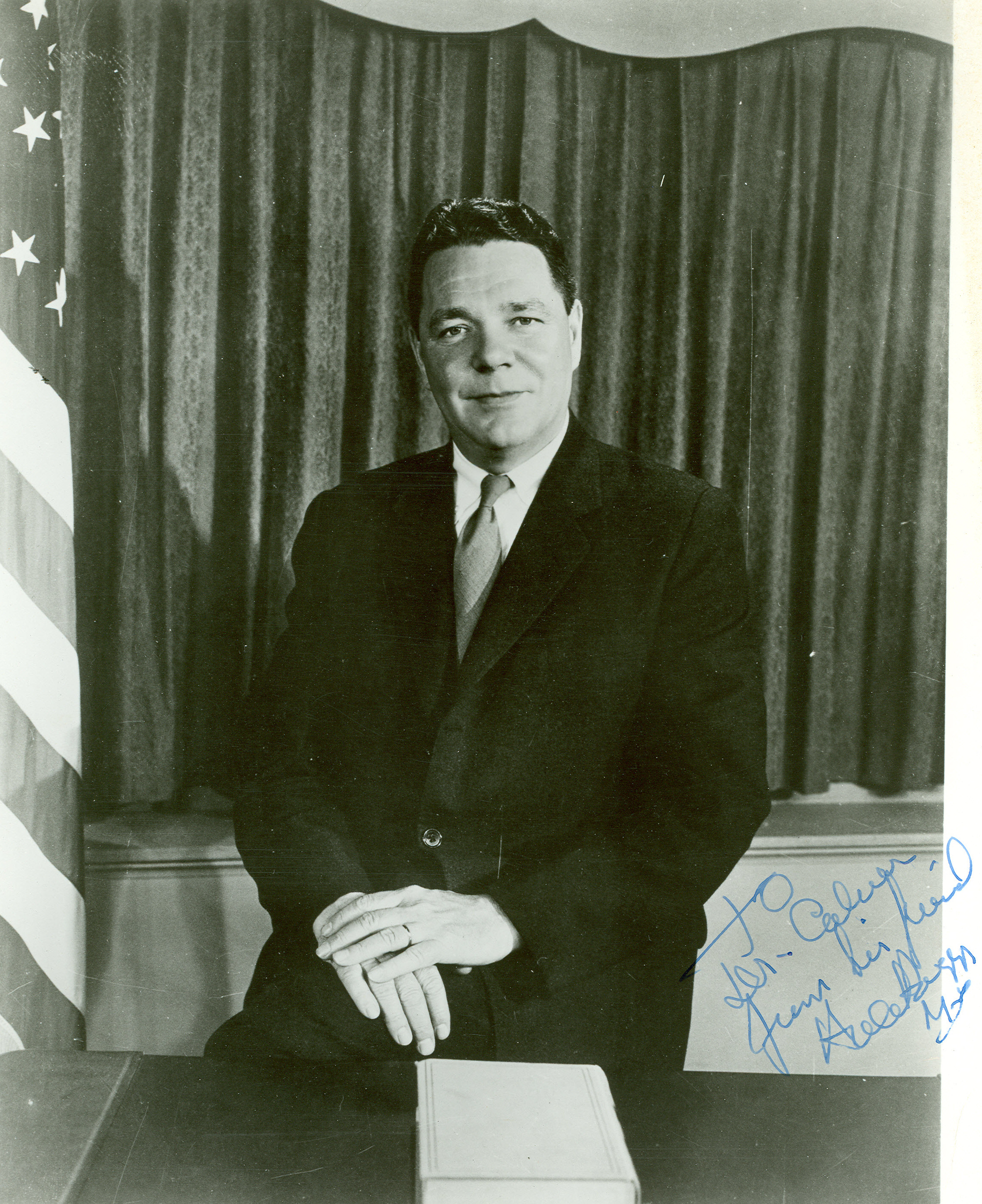
Hale Boggs

- Hale Boggs, 1937, U.S. representative, 1941–1943, 1946–1972 (D)
- James "Jimmy" Domengeaux, 1931, U.S. representative (D)
- Bob Livingston, 1968, U.S. representative, 1977–1999 (R)
- Lewis L. Morgan, 1899, U.S. representative, 1912–1917 (D)
- James H. Morrison, 1934, U.S. representative, 1943–1967 (D)
- John Rarick, 1949, U.S. representative, 1967–1975 (D)
- Cedric Richmond, JD 1998, U.S. representative, 2011–2021 (D)
- Jared Y. Sanders Jr., 1914, U.S. representative, 1934–1937, 1941–1943 (D)

=== State ===
- Buddy Caldwell, 1973, attorney general of Louisiana (R)
- Edward M. Carmouche, Master of Civil Law 1940, chairman of the Louisiana Democratic Party 1966–1968; attorney in Lake Charles
- Philip Ciaccio, state representative, New Orleans City Council member, state circuit judge 1982–1998
- W. T. Cunningham, Law, judge of the 11th Judicial District in Natchitoches and Red River parishes, member of the Louisiana House of Representatives 1908–1912
- Grey Ferris, Mississippi state senator (D)
- Harvey Fields, state senator for Union and Morehouse parishes 1916–1920, former law partner and political ally of Huey Pierce Long Jr. (D)
- Alexi Giannoulias, 2003, former Illinois State Treasurer (D)
- Philip H. Gilbert, district attorney, state district court judge, state senator, lieutenant governor from Assumption Parish (D)
- John Grenier, 1953, Alabama Republican Party figure (R)
- William Pike Hall Sr., Louisiana state senator for Caddo and DeSoto parishes, 1924–1932, Shreveport attorney (D)
- Lloyd Hendrick, state senator for Caddo and Desoto parishes 1940–1948
- Sam A. LeBlanc III, J.D. 1963; state legislator, temporary federal appeals court judge; lawyer in New Orleans; retired to St. Francisville (D)
- Samuel A. LeBlanc I, Law 1908; state legislator, state district and appeals court judge, justice of the Louisiana Supreme Court, 1949–1954 (D)
- Walt Leger III, Law 2003; state legislator, 2008–2020; speaker pro tempore, Louisiana House of Representatives, 2012–2020, New Orleans, Louisiana
- Jean-Paul Morrell, 2004, member of both houses of the Louisiana State Legislature
- George T. Oubre, member of the Louisiana State Senate from St. James Parish, 1968–1972; lost runoff election to William J. Guste in 1971 for state attorney general
- Todd Schuler, Maryland state delegate (D)
- Jasper K. Smith (non-degreed), Louisiana state representative from Caddo Parish 1944–1948 and 1952–1964
- Jeff R. Thompson, 1995, member of the Louisiana House from Bossier Parish and incoming 9th Judicial District Court judge (R)

=== Local ===
- Shaun Abreu, 2018, New York City Council
- Ravinder Bhalla, mayor of Hoboken, New Jersey (2017–)
- Paul Capdevielle, 1868, mayor of New Orleans, 1900–1904
- Robert Poydasheff, mayor of Columbus, Georgia (2003–2007) (R)
- T. Semmes Walmsley, 1912, mayor of New Orleans, 1929–1936 (D)

=== Other offices ===
- Kenneth McClintock, J.D., 1980, 13th president of the Puerto Rico Senate, current secretary of state and lieutenant governor of Puerto Rico
