= Louisiana's 26th House of Representatives district =

American legislative district

Louisiana's 26th State House of Representatives district
Representative
Ed Larvadain III; D–Alexandria

Louisiana's 26th House of Representatives district is one of 105 Louisiana House of Representatives districts. It is currently represented by Democrat Ed Larvadain III of Alexandria.

== Geography ==
HD26 includes a large part of the city of Alexandria.

== Election results ==
Year	Winning candidate	Party	Percent	Opponent	Party	Percent	Opponent	Party	Percent
2011	Herbert Dixon	Democratic	100%						
2015 - Special	Jeff Hall	Democratic	84.1%	Daniel Williams	Democratic	11.4%	Alice "Red" Hammond	Democratic	4.6%
2015	Jeff Hall	Democratic	100%						
2019 - Special	Ed Larvadain III	Democratic	61.1%	Sandra Franklin	Democratic	38.9%			
2019	Ed Larvadain III	Democratic	54.1%	Sandra Franklin	Democratic	26.7%	Ken'Travius Coleman	Democratic	19.2%
2023	Ed Larvadain III	Democratic	61.5%	Sandra Franklin	Democratic	20.2%	Reddex Washington	Democratic	18.3%
