= Wellborn Jack =

American politician (1907–1991)

Wellborn Jack, Sr.
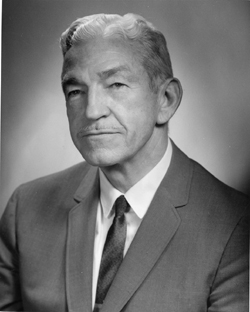
- Official State Representative Photograph of Jack Wellborn Sr.

Louisiana State Representative for Caddo Parish (at-large)
- In office 1940–1964
- Preceded by: At-large delegation: Dr. P. T. Alexander; William J. B. Chandler; John Jolley, Jr. Ben R. Simpson
- Succeeded by: J. Bennett Johnston, Jr.

Member of the Caddo Parish Police Jury
- In office 1976–1984
- Succeeded by: Position Abolished

Personal details
- Born: November 27, 1907 Shreveport, Louisiana, U.S.
- Died: June 1, 1991 (aged 83)
- Resting place: Forest Park East Cemetery in Shreveport
- Party: Democratic
- Spouse: Martha Elizabeth DeWitt Jack (married 1935-1991, his death)
- Relations: George Whitfield Jack, Jr. (brother) William Pike Hall Sr. (first cousin) Pike Hall Jr. (first cousin once removed)
- Children: 3, including Wellborn Jack Jr.
- Parent: George Whitfield Jack, Sr.
- Education: Centenary College of Louisiana (Bachelors of Arts); Tulane University (Juris Doctor)
- Occupation: Lawyer

Wellborn Jack, Sr. (November 27, 1907 – June 1, 1991), was an attorney from Shreveport, Louisiana, who was a Democratic member of the Louisiana House of Representatives from Caddo Parish serving from 1940 to 1964. He finished in sixth place for five at-large seats in the general election held on March 3, 1964.

== Early life ==
Jack is descended within the United States from an Irishman, Patrick Jack, who operated a tavern in Charlotte, North Carolina, prior to the American Revolution. Jack's father, George Whitfield Jack, Sr., a native of Natchitoches, Louisiana and a graduate of Tulane University Law School, was an educator-turned-lawyer who served in Shreveport from 1917 until his death in 1924 as a judge of the United States District Court for the Western District of Louisiana. He was appointed to the bench by U.S. President Woodrow Wilson.

== Career ==
Following his father's steps, he also received a Juris Doctor degree from Tulane University Law School after completing his undergraduate at Centenary College of Louisiana.

== Career ==
Wellborn Jack practiced law with his brother, George Whitfield Jack, Jr., who served as a colonel under General Matthew Ridgway in World War II. He later founded the law firm, Jack & Jack, with his son, Wellborn Jack Jr. (1936–2023). Jack, Jr., a specialist in employment and labor law and an environmentalist recalled that his father had little interest in genealogy and said, "What matters most is not what you sprang from but what you sprang at."

== Political career ==
=== State representative ===
Just weeks after taking his oath of office as a state representative, Jack, along with the former mayor of Minden, J. Frank Colbert, ran unsuccessfully for Louisiana's 4th congressional district seat in the United States House of Representatives. He was eliminated from the runoff election, with victory claimed by the three-term incumbent Overton Brooks, also of Shreveport.

Like virtually all of the Shreveport-area politicians during the 1950s, Jack was known for his fervent support of racial segregation. In 1956, he opposed a bill which would have exempted the Sugar Bowl in New Orleans from the state ban on "interracial activities". He supported a bill to require the labeling of blood by race of the donor. The raising of the Confederate flag at the Caddo Parish Courthouse embodied the sentiments of white segregationists of Jack's era.

In 1962, Jack joined his House colleague, Representative Parey Branton of Shongaloo in Webster Parish, in calling for a change in the method by which Louisiana allocates its electoral votes. The two urged adoption of the framework used by Maine and Nebraska under which one elector is allotted for each congressional district to the winner by plurality in that district, and two at-large electoral votes are assigned to the top vote-getter statewide, plurality or majority. The plan was not adopted. It could have enabled Louisiana to choose split electors, as Alabama did in 1960 and New Jersey in 1860.

Jack's House tenure extended from the administrations of Governors Sam Houston Jones to the second term of Jimmie Davis. During his long career in the House, Jack served alongside numerous colleagues who reached the highest point in state politics, including Taddy Aycock, Bill Dodd, C. H. "Sammy" Downs, John McKeithen, Louis J. Michot, deLesseps Story Morrison, Sr., Dave L. Pearce, and William M. Rainach, along with his Caddo colleagues Algie D. Brown, Frank Fulco, and James C. Gardner.

Jack lost his House seat after twenty-four years because two Republicans, Morley A. Hudson and Taylor W. O'Hearn, led the field of legislative candidates in 1964. Hudson and O'Hearn, the first two Republicans to serve in the Louisiana legislature since Reconstruction, benefited from Shreveport Republican Charlton Lyons, who carried the GOP gubernatorial banner in a ground-breaking but unsuccessful race against the Democrat John McKeithen of rural Caldwell Parish south of Monroe. In addition to Jack, the other Democrat eliminated in the 1964 election was Jasper K. Smith, a lawyer from Vivian in northern Caddo Parish.

Days after President Lyndon B. Johnson signed into law the Civil Rights Act of 1964, Jack wrote a letter to the former Shreveport Journal reaffirming his own belief in segregation: "The white man and the Negro man are happy with their lot here in this area ..."

=== Later Public Office ===
In 1966, two years after his legislative service lapsed, Jack ran unsuccessfully for the Louisiana Public Service Commission, a utility regulatory agency, in an attempt to win the seat held by the appointed John S. Hunt, II, of Monroe, a nephew of Governors Huey Pierce Long, Sr., and Earl Kemp Long. In that campaign Jack declared himself as one opposed to all kinds of "federal encroachment." He was joined in the race against Hunt by two of his former legislative colleagues, Parey Branton and John Sidney Garrett of Haynesville. Though Branton finished in sixth place in the contest, he led by a plurality in his own Webster Parish. Hunt and Garrett, the two leading candidates, met in a runoff election on September 24. Hunt had enjoyed a considerable plurality in the first primary round of balloting and then defeated Garrett to hold on to the position. John McKeithen was the previous public service commissioner from the district, and as governor had named Hunt as his own successor.

From 1976 to 1984, Jack was an elected member of the final two terms of the former Caddo Parish Police Jury, the parish governing body. He lost his position on the police jury, when it was reorganized in 1984 as the Caddo Parish Commission.

Jack died of congestive heart failure and is interred at Forest Park East Cemetery in Shreveport.

Political offices
Preceded by At-large delegation: Dr. P. T. Alexander; William J. B. Chandler; John Jolley, Jr. Ben R. Simpson	Louisiana State Representative for Caddo Parish; Wellborn Jack, Sr. 1940–1964	Succeeded by J. Bennett Johnston, Jr.
