= Ben F. Holt =

American politician (1925–1995)

Benjamin F. Holt

Louisiana State Representative for Rapides Parish
- In office 1956–1960
- Preceded by: At-large members: Cecil R. Blair; Lloyd George Teekell H. N. Goff
- Succeeded by: At-large members: Charles K. McHenry; Robert J. Munson Ed Rand

Personal details
- Born: November 1, 1925 Jena, La Salle Parish; Louisiana, USA
- Died: September 18, 1995 (aged 69) Pineville, Rapides Parish; Louisiana
- Resting place: Forest Lawn Memorial Park near Pineville, Louisiana
- Party: Democratic
- Spouse: Joyce Ivoyne Lemmons Holt (married 1946-1995, his death)
- Relations: Judge Jack Holt (brother)
- Children: Beverly Gayle Holt Henagan
- Parent(s): Robert Frank and Eva Mae Russell Holt

Benjamin F. Holt, known as Ben F. Holt (November 1, 1925 – September 18, 1995), was a Conservative Democrat from Pineville, Louisiana, who served a single term in the Louisiana House of Representatives for Rapides Parish from 1956 to 1960, during the administration of Governor Earl Kemp Long.

== Political career ==
In the legislature, Holt emerged as a frequent critic of the Long administration. He opposed Long's attempt in a special session to remove Theo Cangelosi of Baton Rouge from the chairmanship of the Louisiana State University board of trustees. Long quarreled with his former friend Cangelosi regarding Long's divorce from his wife, Blanche R. Long, and Long's brief confinement in 1959 to a mental institution. Holt claimed that Cangelosi's removal for personal reasons would hurt the national image of LSU and weaken the institution.

In 1960, after he had left the legislature, Holt was a member of the Louisiana State Democratic Central Committee and allied with the forces opposed to the Kennedy-Johnson ticket. Along with the controversial segregationist political boss, Judge Leander Perez of Plaquemines Parish in south Louisiana, Holt supported free or unpledged electors, rather than the national-oriented slate organized by Judge Edmund Reggie of Crowley, later the father-in-law of U.S. senator Edward M. Kennedy of Massachusetts. That movement coalesced in the since defunct Louisiana States Rights' Party, which carried for that election the support of such public figures as the 1959 gubernatorial candidate William M. Rainach, former U.S. representative Jared Y. Sanders, Jr., later Speaker of the Louisiana House of Representatives John Sidney Garrett, and future Republican governor David C. Treen. Nevertheless, Kennedy was an easy winner in Louisiana over the Republican candidate, Vice President Richard M. Nixon.

In the summer of 1960, Holt ran unsuccessfully in the Democratic primary election for the United States House of Representatives for Louisiana's 8th congressional district, since disbanded because of population loss. Holt was eliminated from the runoff election between former governor Earl Long and the short-term incumbent representative Harold B. McSween of Alexandria. Long died a few days after his final election victory; the seat still went to McSween, who was chosen as the party nominee by the Democratic State Central Committee, of which Holt was a member. Holt attended Long's burial in Winnfield and described the vacuum left in Democratic ranks by the former governor's untimely death.

== Family ==
Holt was one of two sons born within a year of each other in Jena in La Salle Parish, to Robert "Bob" Holt and the former Eva Russell. He was reared and educated in Pollock in Grant Parish. Holt's older brother, Jack Holt (1924–2013), was a B-24 pilot who flew in the last bombing missions over Germany in World War II. A lawyer in practice in Alexandria, Jack Holt was the first municipal judge in Pineville, a position which he held for two decades. A graduate of Louisiana College in Pineville and the Louisiana State University Law Center in Baton Rouge, Jack Holt was an active deacon and leader in the First Baptist Church in Pineville. Jack's son and Ben Holt's nephew, Robert Earl "Bobby" Holt, Sr. (1948–2017), was a cattle rancher and then real estate developer in Rapides Parish who also lived for a time in Alaska and Colorado.

Ben Holt's widow was the former Joyce Ivoyne Lemmons (September 30, 1926 – January 24, 2016), a Pollock native who resided in Tioga in Rapides Parish. The Holts are interred at Forest Lawn Memorial Park in Ball, north of Pineville; his brother, at Greenwood Memorial Park in Pineville.

Preceded by At-large members: Cecil R. Blair; Lloyd George Teekell H. N. Goff	Louisiana State Representative for Rapides Parish; 1956–1960	Succeeded by At-large members: Charles K. McHenry; Robert J. Munson Ed Rand
