= H. N. Goff =

American politician (1910–1978)

Hardy Nathaniel Goff

Louisiana State Representative for Rapides Parish
- In office 1952–1956
- Preceded by: At-large members: W. George Bowdon Jr. T. C. Brister Lawrence T. Fuglaar
- Succeeded by: At-large members: Ben F. Holt; Robert J. Munson Lloyd George Teekell

Personal details
- Born: July 9, 1910
- Died: July 2, 1978 (aged 67)
- Resting place: Alexandria Memorial Gardens in Alexandria, Louisiana
- Party: Democratic
- Occupation: Businessman

Hardy Nathaniel Goff (July 9, 1910 – July 2, 1978), was a businessman from Alexandria, Louisiana, who served as a Democrat from 1952 to 1956 in the Louisiana House of Representatives during the administration of Governor Robert F. Kennon. His colleagues were his fellow Alexandria Democrats Cecil R. Blair and Lloyd George Teekell.

Goff owned an insurance agency in Alexandria. A subdivision is also named for him. Goff died at age 67 and is interred at Alexandria Memorial Gardens.

Preceded by At-large members: W. George Bowdon Jr. T. C. Brister; Lawrence T. Fuglaar	Louisiana State Representative for Rapides Parish; 1952–1956; Served alongside: Cecil R. Blair, James R. Eubank, and Lloyd George Teekell	Succeeded by At-large members: Ben F. Holt; Robert J. Munson; Lloyd George Teekell
