= James R. Eubank =

American politician (1914–1952)

James Rowland Eubank

Louisiana State Representative for Rapides Parish
- In office May 1952 – November 9, 1952
- Preceded by: Lawrence T. Fuglaar W. George Bowdon, Jr. T. C. Brister
- Succeeded by: Lloyd George Teekell

Personal details
- Born: December 8, 1914
- Died: November 9, 1952 (aged 37) Alexandria, Louisiana, US
- Resting place: Greenwood Memorial Park in Pineville, Louisiana
- Party: Democratic
- Spouse: Katherine Bringhurst Eubank
- Relations: Swords Lee (maternal grandfather)
- Children: 2
- Education: Louisiana State University Law Center
- Occupation: Lawyer

Military service
- Branch/service: United States Army
- Battles/wars: World War II

James Rowland Eubank (December 8, 1914 – November 9, 1952) was a lawyer from Alexandria, Louisiana, who served for six months during 1952 in the Louisiana House of Representatives for Rapides Parish. He died in office at the age of thirty-seven from a heart attack.

Eubank was a floor leader for Governor Robert F. Kennon.

Eubank served in the United States Army during World War II. He is interred alongside his parents at Greenwood Memorial Park in Pineville, Louisiana.

Preceded by W. George Bowdon, Jr. T. C. Brister Lawrence T. Fuglaar	Louisiana State Representative for Rapides Parish; James Rowland Eubank (alongside Cecil R. Blair and H. N. Goff); May 1952–November 1952	Succeeded by Lloyd George Teekell
