= Lawrence T. Fuglaar =

American politician (1895–1972)

Lawrence Tyler Fuglaar, Sr.

Louisiana State Representative for Rapides Parish
- In office 1948–1952
- Preceded by: At-large members: Carl B. Close; C. H. "Sammy" Downs John R. Hunter, Jr.
- Succeeded by: At-large members: Cecil R. Blair; James R. Eubank; Lloyd George Teekell H. N. Goff

Personal details
- Born: September 6, 1895 Pineville, Louisiana, US
- Died: April 18, 1972 (aged 76) Drowned at Toledo Bend Reservoir, Texas, US
- Party: Democratic
- Spouse(s): (1) Hilda Johnson Fuglaar (died 1930) (2) Leona J. Fuglaar
- Children: 5

Lawrence Tyler Fuglaar, Sr. (September 6, 1895 – April 18, 1972), was a Democrat from Pineville, Louisiana, who served in the Louisiana House of Representatives from 1948 to 1952 during the second administration of Governor Earl Kemp Long.

In 1972, Fuglaar drowned when his boat capsized while he was fishing with his wife on Toledo Bend Reservoir near Hemphill in Sabine County in East Texas. His second wife, Leona J. Fuglaar, summoned for help and survived.

Preceded by At-large members: Carl B. Close; C. H. "Sammy" Downs John R. Hunter Jr.	Louisiana State Representative for Rapides Parish; 1948–1952; With: W. George Bowdon Jr. T. C. Brister	Succeeded by At-large members: Cecil R. Blair; James R. Eubank; Lloyd George Teekell H. N. Goff
