= Ned Randolph =

American politician from Louisiana

Mayor of Alexandria, Louisiana
- In office December 1986 – December 2006
- Preceded by: John K. Snyder
- Succeeded by: Jacques Roy

Member of the Louisiana House of Representatives from the 29th district
- In office 1976–1984
- Preceded by: Cecil R. Blair
- Succeeded by: William Joseph "Joe" McPherson, Jr.

Member of the Louisiana House of Representatives from the 26th district
- In office 1972–1976
- Preceded by: At-large delegation: T. C. Brister; W. K. Brown; R. W. "Buzzy" Graham Robert J. Munson
- Succeeded by: Jock Scott

Personal details
- Born: Edward Gordon Randolph, Jr. February 1, 1942 Alexandria, Louisiana, U.S.
- Died: October 4, 2016 (aged 74) Alexandria, Louisiana, U.S.
- Resting place: Greenwood Cemetery; Pineville, Louisiana, U.S.
- Party: Democratic
- Spouse: Deborah Broussard Randolph (m. 1994)
- Children: 3
- Occupation: Attorney

Military service
- Allegiance: United States; Louisiana
- Branch/service: United States Air Force; Louisiana Air National Guard
- Years of service: 1967-1971
- Rank: Captain
- Battles/wars: Vietnam War
- Randolph served in both houses of the Louisiana State Legislature and as mayor of Alexandria, but was unsuccessful in two campaigns for the United States House of Representatives.

Edward Gordon "Ned" Randolph Jr. (February 1, 1942 – October 4, 2016), was an American politician who served in the Louisiana House of Representatives from 1972 to 1976, in the Louisiana State Senate from 1976 to 1984, and as mayor of Alexandria, Louisiana from 1986 to 2006. Randolph ran for a seat in the United States House of Representatives in 1982 and 1992, losing both campaigns. In 1997, Randolph lost a bid for a seat on the Louisiana Circuit Courts of Appeal. Randolph was inducted into the Louisiana Political Museum and Hall of Fame in 2008.

== Death and legacy ==
Randolph died on October 4, 2016, from complications of Alzheimer's disease. An outpouring of remembrances by members of the Louisiana House of Representatives, Louisiana State Senate, former governors, Governor John Bel Edwards, and numerous other former and current local, state, and national public servants followed.

On November 27, 2018, the Alexandria City Council voted to name the downtown convention in Randolph's honor to focus upon the late mayor's emphasis on economic development. The official name is the Alexandria Edward G. "Ned" Randolph Riverfront Center; in short form, the Randolph Riverfront Center. First opened in 1996 with a price tag of $17.2 million, of which $13 million was state funded, the center has more than 67,000 square feet of events space and is connected to the Hotel Bentley and the Holiday Inn Downtown.

== See also ==
- List of mayors of Alexandria, Louisiana

Louisiana State Senate
Preceded by At-large membership: T. C. Brister; W. K. Brown; R. W. "Buzzy" Graham Robert J. Munson	Louisiana State Representative from District 26 (Rapides Parish); Edward Gordon "Ned" Randolph, Jr. 1972–1976	Succeeded by Jock Scott
Preceded by Cecil R. Blair	Louisiana State Senator from District 29 (Rapides Parish); Edward Gordon "Ned" Randolph, Jr. 1976–1984	Succeeded by William Joseph "Joe" McPherson, Jr.
Political offices
Preceded by John K. Snyder	Mayor of Alexandria, Louisiana; Edward Gordon "Ned" Randolph, Jr. 1986–2006	Succeeded by Jacques Roy
Preceded by Clarence W. Hawkins of Bastrop	President of the Louisiana Municipal Association; Edward Gordon "Ned" Randolph, Jr. 2001–2002	Succeeded by Bobby R. Simpson of East Baton Rouge Parish
