= Senator Stafford (disambiguation) =

Robert Stafford (1913–2006) was a U.S. Senator from Vermont from 1971 to 1989. Senator Stafford may also refer to:

- Grove Stafford (1897–1975), Louisiana State Senate
- Ronald B. Stafford (1936–2005), New York State Senate
- Matthew Stafford (politician) (1852–1950), Senate of Ireland
