= 1960 Louisiana lieutenant gubernatorial election =

- April 19, 1960

Nominee	Taddy Aycock	Clark C. Boardman
Party	Democratic	Republican
Popular vote	392,421	68,186
Percentage	83.16%	14.45%
Lieutenant Governor before election
Lether Edward Frazar
Democratic
Elected Lieutenant Governor
Taddy Aycock
Democratic

The 1960 Louisiana lieutenant gubernatorial election was held on April 19, 1960, in order to elect the lieutenant governor of Louisiana. Democratic nominee and former Speaker of the Louisiana House of Representatives Taddy Aycock defeated Republican nominee Clark C. Boardman and States Rights nominee Vaughn L. Phelps.

== Democratic primary ==
The Democratic primary election was held on December 5, 1959, but as no candidate received a majority of the votes cast, a runoff was held in January 1960 between incumbent mayor of Alexandria William George Bowdon Jr. and former Speaker of the Louisiana House of Representatives Taddy Aycock. Former speaker Taddy Aycock won the runoff but the results of the election are unknown, and was thus elected as the nominee for the general election.

=== Results ===
Candidate	First Round		Run-off	
Candidate	Votes	%	Votes	%
Taddy Aycock	219,551	27.88	0	–
William George Bowdon Jr.	227,758	28.92	0	–
Earl Long	157,452	19.99		
Cy D. F. Courtney	105,637	13.41		
William J. White	61,440	7.80		
Frank A. Jordan Jr.	15,766	2.00		
Total	787,604	100.00		

== General election ==
On election day, April 19, 1960, Democratic nominee Taddy Aycock won the election by a margin of 324,235 votes against his foremost opponent Republican nominee Clark C. Boardman, thereby retaining Democratic control over the office of lieutenant governor. Aycock was sworn in as the 45th lieutenant governor of Louisiana on May 10, 1960.

=== Results ===
Louisiana lieutenant gubernatorial election, 1960
Party	Candidate	Votes	%
Democratic	Taddy Aycock	392,421	83.16
Republican	Clark C. Boardman	68,186	14.45
States' Rights	Vaughn L. Phelps	11,299	2.39
Total votes		471,906	100.00
Democratic hold			
