= Carl B. Close =

American politician (1907–1980)

Carl Buell Close Sr.

Louisiana State Representative for Rapides Parish
- In office 1944–1947

Mayor of Alexandria, Louisiana
- In office 1947–1953
- Preceded by: J. A. Blackman
- Succeeded by: William George Bowdon Jr.

Personal details
- Born: October 17, 1907 Robertsville, Conway County, Arkansas, US
- Died: December 28, 1980 (aged 73) Alexandria, Louisiana
- Resting place: Forest Lawn Memorial Park in Pineville, Louisiana
- Party: Democratic
- Spouses: Ella Jordan Close (married 1935-1959, her death); Ilie Jewel Willis Close (surviving spouse)
- Children: 1

Carl Buell Close Sr. (October 17, 1907 – December 28, 1980), was a Democratic politician from Alexandria, Louisiana, who served as a member of the Louisiana House of Representatives from 1944 to 1947, when he stepped down to become the mayor of his adopted city of Alexandria, a post he held until 1953.

== Early life ==
Close was one of six children of a country physician, Edgar Close (1871-1948), originally from Carbondale in southern Illinois, and the former Mary Louvenia Patton (1873-1948), a native of Harrison in Boone County in northwestern Arkansas. Close was born in rural Robertsville near Morrilton in Conway County in north central Arkansas.

== Personal life ==
Edgar and Mary Close married in 1891 and died in 1948 some eight months apart. In 1935, Carl Close married Sarah Ella Jordan (1907-1959) of Atkins in Pope County, Arkansas. Their son and only child, Carl Close Jr., was born in 1936 in New Orleans. The junior Close graduated from Bolton High School in Alexandria and Louisiana Tech University in Ruston, was an officer in the United States Air Force, and worked as data processing specialist in Alexandria, where he died in 2000 at the age of sixty-three. Close Sr., subsequently married the former Ilie Jewel Willis (1907-1995).

== Political career ==
Close served in the House during the administration of Governor Jimmie Davis alongside the two other at-large representatives from Rapides Parish, John R. Hunter Jr., and C. H. "Sammy" Downs, later a state senator and a gubernatorial aide under John J. McKeithen. Close became mayor halfway into an unexpired term. He served with Commissioners Ben F. Bradford and W. H. Smith, who like Close was a former state representative. In 1948, Close attracted attention by discounting the debilitating effects of a drought in Central Louisiana. Two weeks later, W. W. Thomas at the municipal airport seeded a cloud with forty pounds of dry ice. Soon .85 of an inch of rainfall followed. In 1949, Close won a full term as the mayor.

Close was succeeded in the House and as mayor by the same man, his fellow Democrat, William George Bowdon Jr., who held the mayoralty for sixteen years until his third-place finish in the 1969 Democratic primary. Ed Karst then defeated John K. Snyder for the position. Close, Bowdon, Karst, and Karst's successor, John K. Snyder, all served under the former city commission system, which was superseded in 1977 by the mayor-council home rule charter. Carroll E. Lanier in the spring of 1977 became the first mayor under the mayor-council government.

Close died in Alexandria at the age of seventy-three. He is interred at Forest Lawn Memorial Park near Pineville, along with his first wife and son. His daughter-in-law, Betty Anne Reeves Close (born 1937) of Alexandria, and two grandsons survive.

== See also ==
- List of mayors of Alexandria, Louisiana

Preceded by At-large members: T. C. Brister; Neil Haven Klock W. H. Smith	Louisiana State Representative for Rapides Parish; Carl Buell Close Sr. 1944–1947	Succeeded by At-large members: T. C. Brister; William George Bowdon Jr. Lawrence T. Fuglaar
Preceded by J. A. Blackman	Mayor of Alexandria, Louisiana; Carl Buell Close Sr. 1947–1953	Succeeded by William George Bowdon Jr.
