= 1968 Louisiana lieutenant gubernatorial election =

- February 6, 1968
| Nominee | Taddy Aycock |
| Party | Democratic |
| Popular vote | 351,045 |
| Percentage | 100.00% |
- Parish results Aycock: 90–100%
Lieutenant Governor before election
Taddy Aycock
Democratic
Elected Lieutenant Governor
Taddy Aycock
Democratic

The 1968 Louisiana lieutenant gubernatorial election was held on February 6, 1968, in order to elect the lieutenant governor of Louisiana. Democratic nominee and incumbent lieutenant governor Taddy Aycock won re-election as he ran unopposed. This was the last Louisiana lieutenant gubernatorial election where a candidate ran unopposed.

== General election ==
On election day, February 6, 1968, Democratic nominee Taddy Aycock won re-election with 351,045 votes as he ran unopposed, thereby retaining Democratic control over the office of lieutenant governor. Aycock was sworn in for his third term on May 14, 1968.

=== Results ===
Louisiana lieutenant gubernatorial election, 1968
| Party | Candidate | Votes | % |
|---|---|---|---|
| Democratic | Taddy Aycock (incumbent) | 351,045 | 100.00 |
| Total votes | | 351,045 | 100.00 |
| Democratic hold | | | |
