= List of mayors of Alexandria, Louisiana =

The following is a list of mayors of the city of Alexandria, Louisiana, United States.

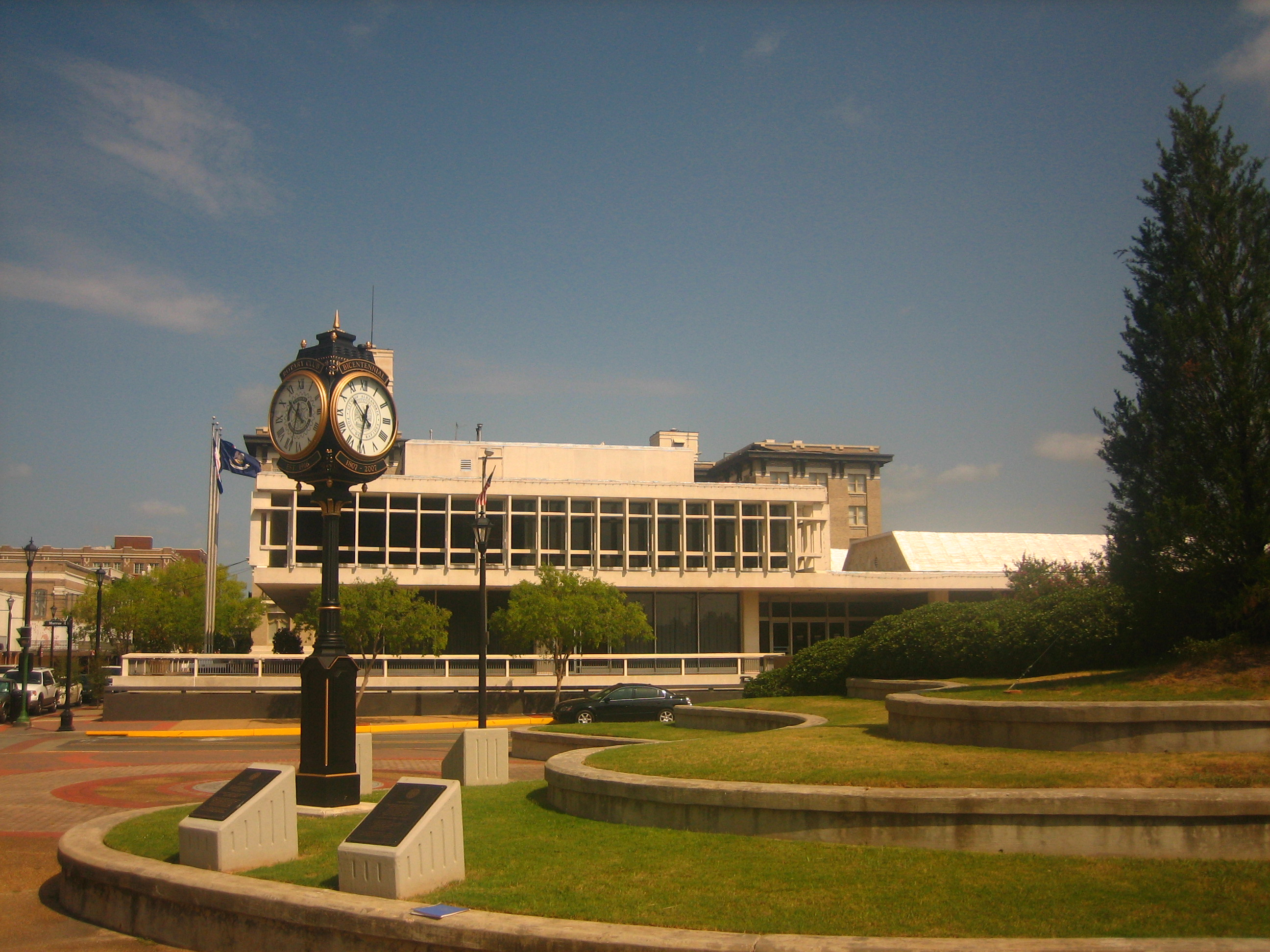
City hall building in Alexandria, Louisiana (photo 2008)

- E. Weil, c.1876
- Jas. Andrews Jr., c.1881
- W.C. McGimsey, c.1884
- Thomas Crawley, c.1885-1890
- F.M. Welch, c.1902
- J.P. Turregano, c.1909
- William W. Whittington Jr., c.1913-1914
- J.F. Foisy, c.1923
- V. V. Lamkin, c.1937
- W. George Bowdon Sr., 1941–1945
- J. A. Blackman, 1945–1947
- Carl B. Close, 1947–1953
- William George Bowdon Jr., 1953–1969
- Ed Karst, 1969–1973
- John K. Snyder, 1973–1977, 1982–1986
- Carroll E. Lanier, 1977–1982
- Ned Randolph, 1986–2006
- Jacques Roy, 2006–2018, 2022–present
- Jeff Hall, 2018–2022

== See also ==
- Alexandria history
