= Wellborn Jack Jr. =

American lawyer (1936–2023)

- Born: July 23, 1936; Shreveport, Louisiana, U.S.
- Died: April 4, 2023 (aged 86); Shreveport, Louisiana, U.S.
- Occupation: Lawyer
- Known for: PTSD-based legal defense, environmental activism
- Parent: Wellborn Jack Sr. (father)
- Relatives: George W. Jack (grandfather); Whitfield Jack (uncle); William Pike Hall Sr. (uncle); Pike Hall Jr. (cousin)

Wellborn Jack Jr. (July 23, 1936 – April 4, 2023) was an American attorney. He was known during his career noted for his legal work in defense of combat veterans with post-traumatic stress disorder, including the first successful PTSD-based defense of a veteran in a murder case.

== Early life and education ==
Wellborn Jack Jr. was born in Shreveport, Louisiana, and was the son of Wellborn Jack Sr., a member of the Louisiana House of Representatives, and a grandson of George Whitfield Jack Sr. Jack Jr. graduated from C. E. Byrd High School and earned his undergraduate and law degrees from Louisiana State University, where he was the editor-in-chief of the Louisiana Law Review.

== Legal career ==
Jack Jr. practiced law for several years alongside his father. He gained prominence starting in 1977, when he took up the defense of a Vietnam veteran who had been accused of murdering his brother-in-law. During his first trial, in 1978, the accused was found guilty of first-degree murder, but Jack obtained a remand on appeal to the Louisiana Supreme Court over reversible error in jury instructions. In 1980, the American Psychiatric Association recognized post-traumatic stress disorder in the Diagnostic and Statistical Manual of Mental Disorders III, and Jack employed PTSD as a defense, citing traumatic events in the accused's childhood and his experience in Vietnam. After the second trial in 1981, the accused was acquitted on the basis of insanity. Legal scholars consider this the first use of PTSD as a successful defense in a criminal trial.

Jack's law review article on the PTSD case has been cited by legal scholars on several occasions.

== Environmental activism and personal life ==
In addition to his legal career, Jack supported environmental causes. He played a key role in the creation of the Caney Creek Wilderness Area in Arkansas. He was a member of the Ozark Society and named "Conservationist of the Year" for his contributions and legal work in this area. Jack successfully led a lawsuit that in 1971 temporarily blocked construction by the Army Corps of Engineers of a dam on the Cossatot River—since the 1990s designated a National Wild and Scenic River—in southwestern Arkansas.

Jack died in 2023 at the age of 86 in Shreveport.
