= C. H. Downs =

American politician (1911–1985)

Member of the Louisiana House of Representatives
- In office 1944–1948 Serving with Carl B. Close; John R. Hunter Jr.
- Preceded by: T. C. Brister; Neil Haven Klock; W. H. Smith
- Succeeded by: T. C. Brister; W. George Bowdon Jr. Lawrence T. Fuglaar

Member of the Louisiana State Senate
- In office 1948–1952
- Preceded by: Grove Stafford
- Succeeded by: John R. Hunter Jr.
- In office 1960–1964
- Preceded by: John R. Hunter Jr.
- Succeeded by: Cecil R. Blair

Personal details
- Born: Crawford Hugh Downs; October 1, 1911 Effie, Louisiana, U.S.
- Died: May 14, 1985 (aged 73) Alexandria, Louisiana, U.S.
- Party: Democratic
- Spouse: Laura Eskew
- Children: 2
- Education: Louisiana Christian University; Louisiana State University

Crawford Hugh "Sammy" Downs (October 1, 1911 – May 14, 1985) was an American politician. He served as a Democratic member of the Louisiana House of Representatives. Downs also served as a member of the Louisiana State Senate.

== Life and career ==
Davis was born in Effie, Louisiana, the son of Callie McCann and U. T. Downs, a mayor and sheriff. He attended Louisiana Christian University, where he earned his bachelor's degree in 1932. He then attended Louisiana State University, where he earned his law and master's degree. Downs taught athletics at the Glenmora High School, and was the head teacher at the Cheneyville High School.

In 1944, Downs was elected to the Louisiana House of Representatives, serving until 1948. In that year, Downs was elected to the Louisiana State Senate, succeeding Grove Stafford. In 1952, Downs was succeeded by John R. Hunter Jr. He then succeeded Hunter in 1956. Downs was succeeded by Cecil R. Blair in 1960. He was later the executive counsel for the 49th Governor of Louisiana, John McKeithen. Downs was the chairperson of the Louisiana Democratic Party. In 1964 was one of the master of ceremonies at John McKeithen's inauguration.

According to Life magazine, McKeithen described Downs as "the only Mafia link I know of in my administration". Davis was involved in 1973 in a case involving the Shoup Voting Machine Corporation which resulted in a hung jury.

Downs died in May 1985 at the Rapides General Hospital in Alexandria, Louisiana, at the age of 73. He was buried in Greenwood Memorial Park.
