= Jacques Roy (mayor) =

Mayor of Alexandria, Louisiana

Jacques Maurice Roy

25th mayor of Alexandria, Louisiana
- Incumbent
- Assumed office December 5, 2022
- Preceded by: Jeff Hall (D)

23rd mayor of Alexandria, Louisiana
- In office December 4, 2006 – December 4, 2018
- Preceded by: Ned Randolph (D)
- Succeeded by: Jeff Hall

Personal details
- Born: September 25, 1970 (age 56) Alexandria, Louisiana, US
- Party: Democratic
- Spouse: Wendy Hendrix Roy
- Relations: Christopher Roy Jr. (brother)
- Children: 2
- Profession: Attorney
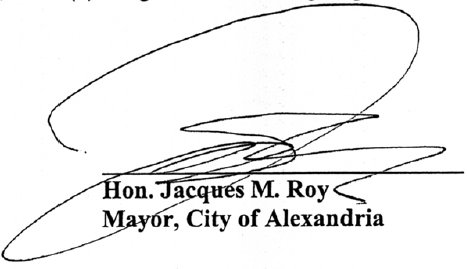
- Signature
- Website: www.jacquesroyformayor.com

Jacques Maurice Roy (born September 25, 1970) was the twenty-third mayor of Alexandria, the parish seat of Rapides Parish in Central Louisiana. He is a Democrat.

== Early life ==
Roy is the son of Christopher Roy Sr., an ad hoc judge of the Louisiana Third Circuit Court of Appeal. He is the brother of Christopher Roy Jr., a former one-term member of the Louisiana House of Representatives and a 2014 candidate for district attorney of the 9th Judicial District Court, based in Alexandria.

Roy graduated in 1988 from Holy Savior Menard Central High School, the Roman Catholic secondary institution in Alexandria. Roy attended Louisiana State University, at which he majored in Political Science, with concentration in American government and politics, and Southern University Law Center, both in Baton Rouge. Prior being elected mayor, Roy practiced law with his brother Chris Jr., in Alexandria.

In 1995, Roy married the former Wendy Hendrix (born February 26, 1972), formerly of Pine Bluff, Arkansas. They have a daughter and a son.

== Election history ==
Roy announced his candidacy for mayor during the first week of August 2006, the fifth of seven candidates to step forward. He campaigned on the issues of smart growth, government transparency, and inclusiveness.

On September 20 that year, Roy finished in first place in the nonpartisan blanket primary, having received over 33 percent of the vote. Delores Brewer, a Republican and chief of staff to outgoing Democratic Mayor Ned Randolph, finished in second place by a margin of only seventeen votes over Roy's fellow Democrat and Alexandria City Councilman-at-large, Roosevelt Johnson, an African American.

Although both Roy and Brewer promised to stay positive during the general election, Brewer quickly went on the offensive. She launched two highly controversial television commercials, one of which was covered nationally.

On November 7, 2006, Roy was elected by a landslide. He captured 76 percent of the vote. In 2010, Roy easily won re-election in the primary, winning more than 63 percent of the vote in a crowded field.

In his bid for a third term as mayor in the primary election on November 4, 2014, Roy faced Jamar Gailes, Jeff Hall, Mitzi "Gibson" LaSalle, and Nicholas R. P. Wright.

Roy was considered a potential Democratic candidate in 2016 for the United States Senate seat vacated by Republican David Vitter, who failed in a bid for governor in 2015. Roy never filed for the race, and victory went to Democrat-turned-Republican John N. Kennedy, the former state treasurer.

On November 8, 2022, Roy was elected Mayor of the City of Alexandria gaining 51% of the vote against his multiple opponents including Jeff Hall the incumbent candidate. Roy began his 4th term as Mayor on December 5, 2022.

== Accomplishments ==
During his first term, Roy launched the Special Planned Activity Redevelopment Corridors (SPARC) Initiative. Architect Frederic Schwartz called SPARC "the most concise vision" for revitalization in the country.

Former mayor Joseph Riley of Charleston, South Carolina, praised Roy, saying "Show me a community with real inventive, aggressive, thoughtful, creative leadership (like Roy), and I will show you a community on the move," to The Town Talk.

Roy created the program Diversity in Action, which significantly increased the number of small, emerging, minority, and women-owned businesses in Alexandria.

During his first term, Roy ordered a comprehensive audit of the Alexandria Police Department, which was conducted by the International Association of Chiefs of Police.

On July 15, 2013, Roy was among nine mayors who established Social Media Giving Day to encourage citizens to support charities via social media.

Roy was involved with the Louisiana Municipal Association. He co-chaired Louisiana's first World Cultural Economic Forum, which was spearheaded by then Lieutenant Governor Mitch Landrieu, the mayor of New Orleans.

== Stepping down ==
Roy did not seek a fourth term in the nonpartisan blanket primary on November 6, 2018, and finished his term in December 2018. Jeff Hall, who lost to Roy in 2014 and the next year became a state representative, again ran for mayor on "a pro-business, pro-people platform that brings jobs back, grows existing businesses, and makes city government something that actually works. Do you think the city is better today than it was eleven years ago?" Hall defeated Catherine Louise Davidson and Kay Michiels in the race.

In 2022, Roy won 53 to 22 percent over Hall to obtain his fourth nonconsecutive term as mayor.

== See also ==
- List of mayors of Alexandria, Louisiana

== Notes ==
1. Louisiana Secretary of State Official Parish Election Results for Election Date: 11/07/06
2. Louisiana Secretary of State Election Results by Precinct-Official Results for Election Date: 11/07/06 Mayor, City of Alexandria
3. Louisiana Secretary of State Official Parish Election Results Results for Election Date: 9/30/06
4. Louisiana Secretary of State Election Results by Precinct-Official Results for Election Date: 9/30/06 Mayor City of Alexandria
5. JacquesRoyForMayor.com
6. Louisiana Secretary of State Parish Elected Officials: Rapides
7. Campaign Ads - What Do You Think? KALB-TV Video blog
8. Brewer, Roy and Johnson Interviews Election Night KALB-TV Video blog
9. Conversation with the Candidates - The Race for Mayor of Alexandria KALB-TV Video blog
10. SPARC and the Economy
11. Alexandria SPARC summit speaker: Leadership, infrastructure investment key to progress
12. Diversity in Action
13. Mayor Roy: There Is a New Deposit in the Bank of Justice
14. Jacques Roy Executive Order 2009-2
15. Untapping Kinetic Energy: Civic Potential Under the Surface
16. Landrieu Praises Alexandria Mayor's Vision, Leadership

Political offices
Preceded by Ned Randolph	Mayor of Alexandria, Louisiana; 2006–2018	Succeeded by Jeff Hall
Preceded by Jeff Hall	Mayor of Alexandria, Louisiana; 2022–	Succeeded by Incumbent
