= Ed Rand =

American politician (1920–1999)

Warren Ed Rand

Louisiana State Representative for Rapides Parish
- In office 1960–1964
- Preceded by: At-large members: Ben F. Holt; Lloyd George Teekell Robert J. Munson
- Succeeded by: At-large members: Larry Parker; Robert J. Munson William P. Polk

Personal details
- Born: February 4, 1920 Alexandria; Rapides Parish; Louisiana, US
- Died: March 26, 1999 (aged 79) Alexandria, Louisiana
- Resting place: Greenwood Memorial Park in Pineville, Louisiana
- Party: Democratic
- Spouse: Florence Marie Robinson Rand
- Relations: Whitfield Jack (brother-in-law)
- Children: Ellen R. Thrash; Two grandsons
- Education: University of Louisiana at Lafayette
- Occupation: Businessman

Warren Ed Rand (February 4, 1920 – March 26, 1999), was a Democratic member of the Louisiana House of Representatives from Alexandria, Louisiana, who served a single term from 1960 to 1964 during the administration of Governor Jimmie Davis.

Rand graduated from the University of Louisiana at Lafayette, then known as the University of Southwestern Louisiana in Lafayette. He was a past president of the Alexandria Jaycees and a long-term member of the First United Methodist Church on Jackson Street in Alexandria. He was engaged in the real estate and life insurance businesses in Alexandria. He had a second residence on an oxbow lake of the Mississippi River, Lake St. John, in Concordia Parish in eastern Louisiana.

At the time Rand served his single term in the legislature, Rapides Parish had three at-large members of the lower House. Single-member districts did not begin until 1972, with the first administration of Governor Edwin Edwards.

Rand was a son of Dr. Paul King Rand Sr. (1888–1956), and the former Ellen Blythe White (1890–1972). His sister, Frances Abigail (1914–1974), was married to the Shreveport attorney Whitfield Jack. Rand married the former Florence Marie Robinson (1925–2005); the couple had a daughter, Ellen R. Thrash of Baton Rouge, and two grandsons. They are interred at Greenwood Memorial Park in Pineville, Louisiana.

Preceded by At-large members: Ben F. Holt; Lloyd George Teekell Robert J. Munson	Louisiana State Representative for Rapides Parish; 1960–1964	Succeeded by At-large members: William P. Polk; Robert J. Munson Larry Parker
