= Jasper K. Smith =

American attorney and politician

Jasper Keith Smith, Jr.
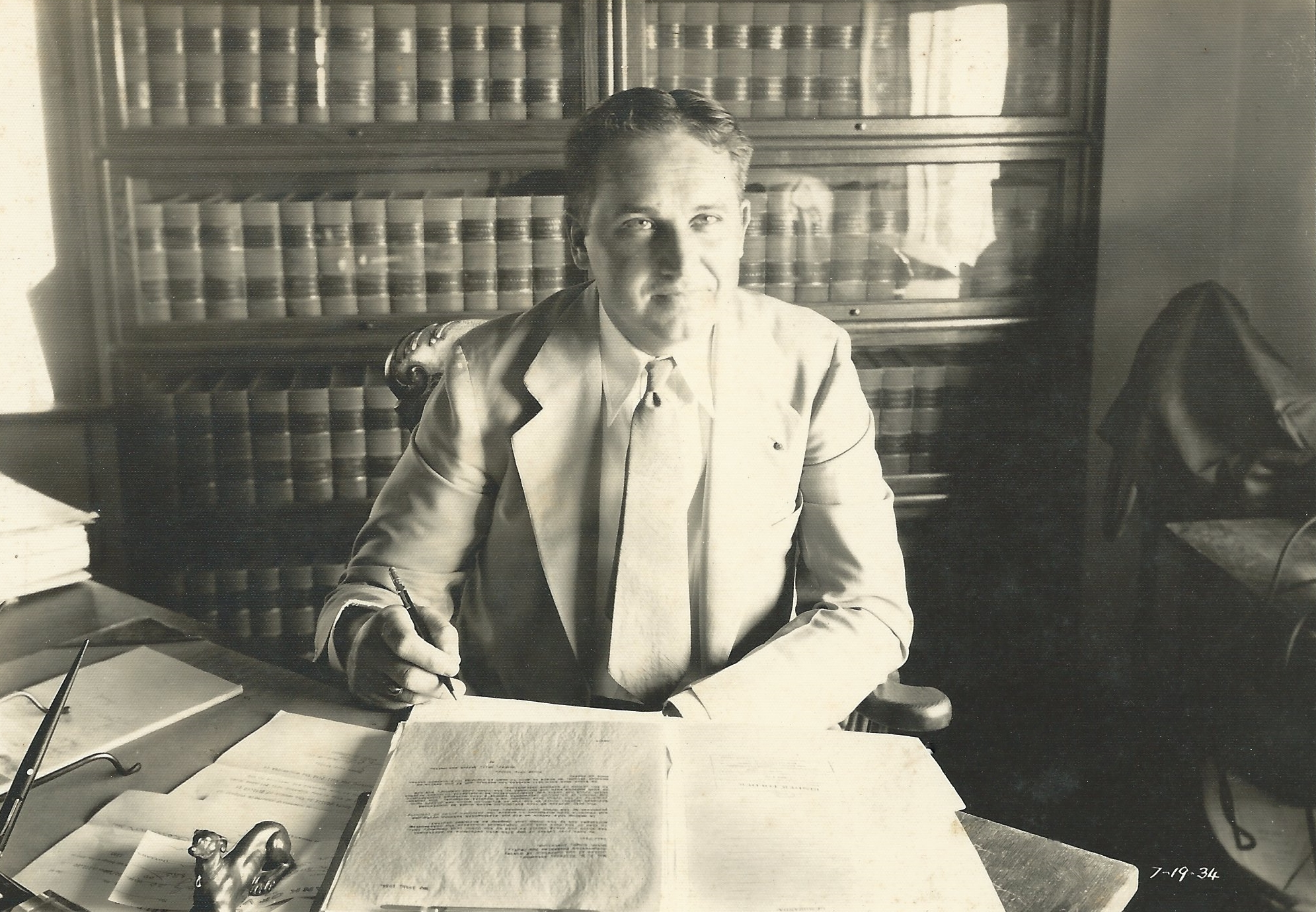
- Jasper K Smith in his one-room law office in Vivian on Jul 19, 1934

Louisiana State Representative from Caddo Parish (at-large seat)
- In office 1944–1948
- Preceded by: At-large membership: H. H. Huckaby; Wellborn Jack; Turner B. Morgan Beatrice Hawthorne Moore
- Succeeded by: Algie D. Brown Edwin F. Hunter, Jr. Wellborn Jack Keith M. Pyburn
- In office 1952–1964
- Preceded by: At-large delegation: Algie D. Brown; Edwin F. Hunter, Jr. Wellborn Jack Keith M. Pyburn
- Succeeded by: At-large delegation: Morley A. Hudson; Taylor W. O'Hearn; Algie D. Brown; Frank Fulco J. Bennett Johnston, Jr.

Personal details
- Born: June 20, 1905 Shreveport, Caddo Parish; Louisiana, USA
- Died: May 18, 1992 (aged 86)
- Resting place: Vivian Cemetery in Vivian, Louisiana
- Party: Democratic
- Spouse: Lavonya Pullen Smith Jacqueline Tippett Smith
- Children: Jasper "Jake" Smith, III John Smith Suzi Smith
- Parent(s): Jasper K. Smith, Sr. Julia Hollingsworth Stewart
- Education: Davidson College; Tulane University Law School
- Occupation: Lawyer

Jasper Keith "Jap" Smith, Jr. (June 20, 1905 – May 18, 1992), was an attorney and politician from Louisiana who served in the Louisiana House of Representatives.

Political offices
Preceded by At-large delegation: H. H. Huckaby; Wellborn Jack; Turner B. Morgan; Beatrice Hawthorne Moore	Louisiana State Representative from Caddo Parish Jasper Keith Smith, Jr. 1944–1948	Succeeded by At-large delegation: Algie D. Brown; Edwin F. Hunter, Jr. Wellborn Jack; Keith M. Pyburn
Preceded by At-large delegation: Algie D. Brown; Edwin F. Hunter, Jr. Wellborn Jack; Keith M. Pyburn	Louisiana State Representative from Caddo Parish Jasper Keith Smith, Jr. 1952–1964	Succeeded by At-large delegation: Morley A. Hudson; Taylor W. O'Hearn; Algie D. Brown; Frank Fulco; J. ennett Johnston, Jr.
