= Ed Larvadain =

American attorney and politician

Member of the Louisiana House of Representatives from the 26th district
- Incumbent
- Assumed office 2019
- Preceded by: Jeff Hall

Personal details
- Party: Democratic
- Education: Southern University (BA, JD)

Ed Larvadain III is an American attorney and politician serving as a member of the Louisiana House of Representatives from the 26th district. He assumed office in 2019.

== Education ==
Larvadain's father, Ed Larvadain Jr., was a prominent civil rights attorney in Alexandria, Louisiana. Larvadain earned a Bachelor of Arts degree in political science from Southern University and a Juris Doctor from the Southern University Law Center.

== Career ==
Since graduating from law school in 1992, Larvadain has worked as an attorney. Larvadain was elected to the Louisiana House of Representatives in 2018 and assumed office in 2019. He is a member of the Civil Law and Procedure Committee.
