= William George Bowdon Jr. =

American politician from Louisiana (1921–2005)

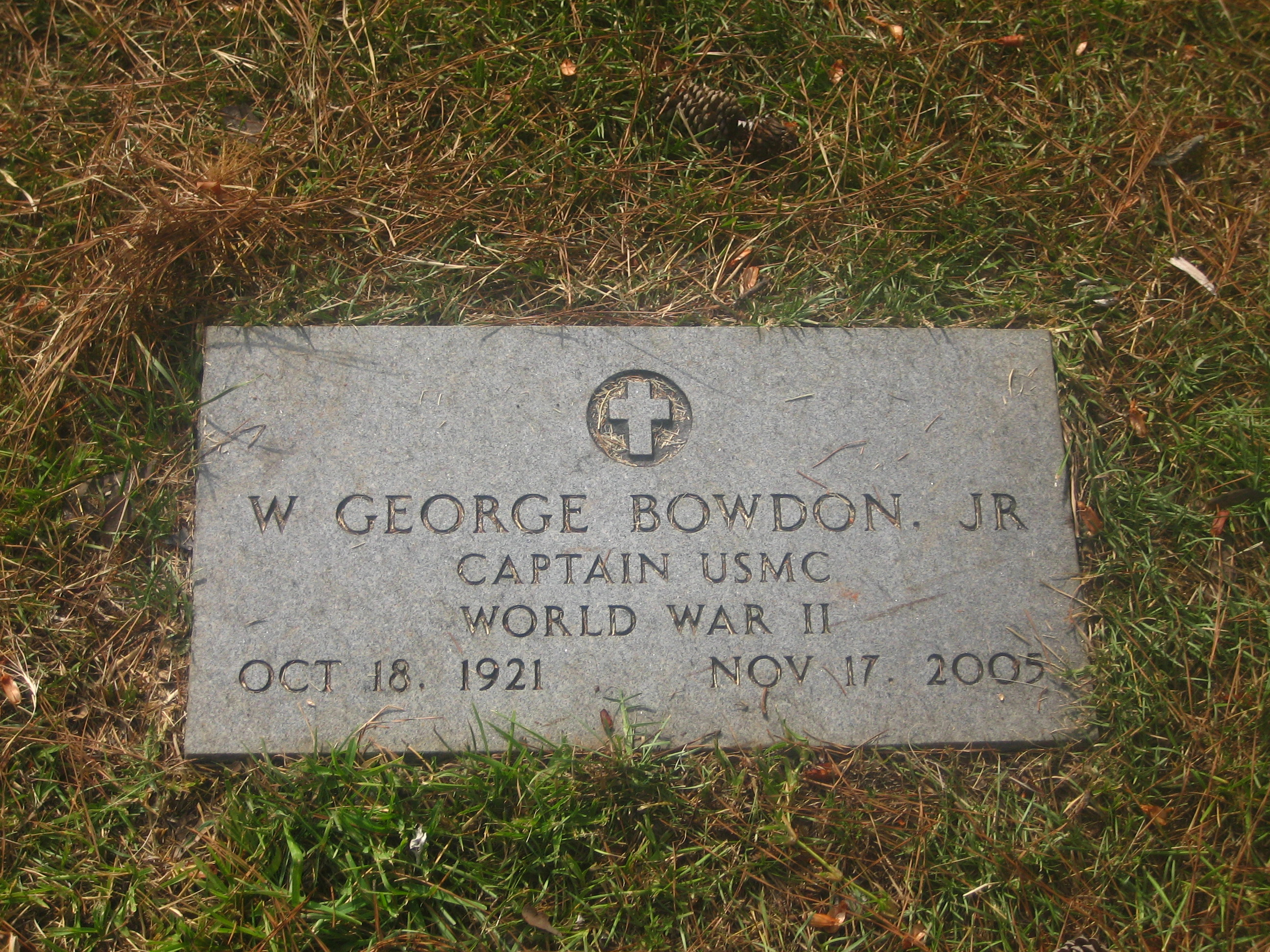

Mayor of Alexandria, Louisiana
- In office 1953–1969
- Preceded by: Carl B. Close
- Succeeded by: Ed Karst

Member of the Louisiana House of Representatives for Rapides Parish
- In office 1948–1952

Personal details
- Born: October 18, 1921 Alexandria, Louisiana, U.S.
- Died: November 17, 2005 (aged 84) Alexandria, Louisiana, U.S.
- Party: Democratic
- Children: 1
- Education: Louisiana State University

William George Bowdon Jr. (October 18, 1921 – November 17, 2005) was an American politician who served in the Louisiana House of Representatives and as the youngest ever mayor of Alexandria from 1953 to 1969. He was a member of the Democratic party.

== Early life ==
William George Bowdon Jr. was born in Alexandria, Louisiana on October 18, 1921, to William George Bowdon Sr. and Mary Lou Middleton. He studied at Bolton High School and graduated from the Louisiana State University in 1943 and entered the United States Marine Corps shortly thereafter. He completed enlisted training in Parris Island, South Carolina and was later commissioned upon completing officer training at Marine Corps Base Quantico in Virginia. For the remainder of World War II, Captain Bowdon was stationed in the Northern Mariana Islands. Upon his return to Alexandria in 1946, he married Ina Vee Smithin 1947 and had a son.

== Political career ==
William George Bowdon Jr. was first elected to the Louisiana House of Representatives in 1948 to represent Rapides Parish for a single term. After his service in the Louisiana House of Representatives, he was elected mayor of Alexandria in 1953, thereby following in his father's footsteps who had served as mayor from 1941 to 1945. He was re-elected in 1957 and became a member of the Louisiana Municipal Association that same year. He also served as the Association's president from 1958 to 1959. It was during the end of his second term as mayor that he decided to run for lieutenant governor of Louisiana. Bowdon won the Democratic primary for lieutenant governor on December 5, 1959, but as he only received 28.92% of the vote, a runoff had to be held between him and former Speaker of the Louisiana House of Representatives Taddy Aycock in January 1960. Bowdon lost to Aycock in the runoff election and thus returned to his mayoral duties in Alexandria. Bowdon was re-elected twice more in 1961 and 1965 before his tenure came to an end following his third-place finish in the 1969 Democratic primary. Bowdon served the remainder of his term whereupon he retired from politics.

== Later life and death ==
William George Bowdon Jr. remained active in his real estate business following his 16-year tenure as mayor, but he was indicted in 1969 on theft charges for allegedly using city employees to work on personal property. He pleaded guilty to stealing $6,641 and was sentenced to five years imprisonment in 1971, however he only ended up serving less than a year at the Louisiana State Penitentiary before being released. Bowdon suffered a heart attack in October 2005, and was thus hospitalised at Christus St. Frances Cabrini Hospital until he was allowed to return home on November 16. He died at his home in Alexandria, Louisiana the following day from a second heart attack and was buried at Greenwood Memorial Park in Pineville, Louisiana on November 21, 2005.

== See also ==
- Louisiana House of Representatives
- Alexandria, Louisiana
- List of mayors of Alexandria, Louisiana
