= Grove Stafford =

American politician (1897–1975)

- Grove Stafford

Member of the Louisiana State Senate
- In office 1940–1948
- Preceded by: George W. Lee
- Succeeded by: C. H. "Sammy" Downs

Personal details
- Born: David Grove Stafford Sr. September 26, 1897 Alexandria, Louisiana, U.S.
- Died: June 21, 1975 (aged 77) Alexandria, Louisiana, U.S.
- Resting place: Greenwood Memorial Park, Pineville, Rapides Parish, Louisiana, U.S.
- Party: Democratic
- Children: 4
- Relatives: Leroy Augustus Stafford (grandfather); Thomas Overton Moore (maternal great-grandfather)
- Education: Louisiana State University; Tulane University

David Grove Stafford Sr. (September 26, 1897 – June 21, 1975) was an American politician. He served as a Democratic member of the Louisiana State Senate.

Born in Alexandria, Louisiana. Stafford was the grandson of brigadier general Leroy Augustus Stafford and the great-grandson of attorney and politician Thomas Overton Moore. He attended Alexandria Senior High School. Stafford attended Louisiana State University, and earned a law degree at Tulane University, also playing football for both Universities. He served in World War I.

In 1940, Stafford was elected to the Louisiana State Senate, serving until 1948. He was elected as president of the Alexandria Bar Association in 1975, two months before his death.

Stafford died in June 1975 at his home in Alexandria, Louisiana, at the age of 77. He was buried in Greenwood Memorial Park.
