= Jeff Hall (politician) =

American politician (born 1951)

Jeffrey W. Hall

24th Mayor of Alexandria, Louisiana
- In office December 4, 2018 – December 5, 2022
- Preceded by: Jacques Roy
- Succeeded by: Jacques Roy

Member of the Louisiana House of Representatives from the 26th district
- In office February 2015 – December 2018
- Preceded by: Herbert Dixon
- Succeeded by: Ed Larvadain

Personal details
- Born: December 26, 1951 (age 74)
- Party: Democratic
- Education: Grambling State University

Jeffrey W. Hall (born December 26, 1951) is an American politician and accountant who served as the 24th mayor of Alexandria, Louisiana from 2018 to 2022. On taking office on December 4, 2018, he stepped down as a Democratic member of the Louisiana House of Representatives for District 26 in Rapides Parish, a position which he assumed in 2015.

== Early life and education ==
Hall graduated from Grambling State University in Grambling, Louisiana. He has resided in Pineville, Opelousas, and Mansfield, Louisiana, and Amarillo, Texas.

== Career ==
Hall stressed economic development, jobs, and resolving the $1 billion state budget shortfall as the principal issues he would face as state representative.

In 2018, Hall announced that he would again run for mayor of Alexandria. Mayor Jacques Roy, first elected in 2006, chose not seek a fourth term in the November 6 primary.

Hall placed first in the Democratic primary and won the general election with 7,842 votes. Turnout was just under 50 percent of registered voters.

On November 8, 2022, Hall was defeated by his predecessor, Jacques Roy, in the Alexandria mayoral race, receiving 22% of the vote to Roy's 55%.

== See also ==
- List of mayors of Alexandria, Louisiana

Preceded by Jacques Roy	24th Mayor of Alexandria, Louisiana; 2018–2022	Succeeded by Jacques Roy

Preceded by Herbert Dixon	Louisiana State Representative for District 26 (Rapides Parish); 2015–2018	Succeeded by Ed Larvadain
