= W. K. Brown =

American politician (1923–2011)

Member of the Louisiana House of Representatives
- In office 1960–1972
- Preceded by: Willard L. Rambo
- Succeeded by: Richard S. Thompson

Personal details
- Born: William Kirkland Brown; January 7, 1923 Dry Prong, Louisiana, U.S.
- Died: July 13, 2011 (aged 88) Alexandria, Louisiana, U.S.
- Party: Democratic
- Spouse: Mae Foster
- Children: 1
- Education: Louisiana State University

William Kirland Brown (January 7, 1923 – July 13, 2011) was an American politician. He served as a Democratic member of the Louisiana House of Representatives.

== Life and career ==
Brown was born in Dry Prong, Louisiana. He attended Dry Prong High School and Louisiana State University. He served in the United States Navy during World War II.

Brown served in the Louisiana House of Representatives from 1960 to 1972.

Brown died on July 13, 2011 at the St. Frances Cabrini Hospital in Alexandria, Louisiana, at the age of 88. He was buried in Forest Lawn Memorial Park.
