= Pike Hall Jr. =

American judge (1931–1999)

Caddo Parish School Board at-large member
- In office 1964–1970

Judge of the Louisiana Court of Appeal for the Second Circuit
- In office 1971–1990

Chief Judge of the Louisiana Court of Appeal for the Second Circuit
- In office 1985–1990

Associate Justice of the Louisiana Supreme Court
- In office 1990–1994
- Succeeded by: Jeffrey P. Victory

Personal details
- Born: May 27, 1931 Shreveport, Caddo Parish; Louisiana, USA
- Died: November 25, 1999 (aged 68) Shreveport, Louisiana
- Party: Democratic
- Spouse: Anne Oden Hall
- Relations: George W. Jack (great-uncle) Whitfield Jack (first cousin once removed) Wellborn Jack (first cousin once removed)
- Children: Brevard Hall Knight Pike Hall III Five grandchildren
- Parent(s): William Pike Hall, Sr. Hazel Tucker Hall
- Education: C. E. Byrd High School Washington and Lee University Louisiana State University Law Center
- Occupation: Lawyer

William Pike Hall Jr., known as Pike Hall Jr. (May 27, 1931 – November 25, 1999), was an associate justice of the Louisiana Supreme Court from 1990 to 1994.

Hall attended Washington and Lee University in Lexington, Virginia, and Louisiana State University, and received a J.D. from the Louisiana State University Law Center in Baton Rouge in 1953.

Hall practiced in Shreveport for a time, and served on the Caddo Parish School Board. In 1970, Hall was elected to the Louisiana Court of Appeal for the Second Circuit, where he served until 1990, when he became an associate justice of the Louisiana Supreme Court. He served in that position until his retirement from the bench in 1994.

Hall died in Shreveport at the age of 68. The appeals court building in Shreveport was named in his honor.

Political offices
Preceded by Missing	Associate Justice of the Louisiana Supreme Court; 1990–1994	Succeeded by Jeffrey P. Victory
