= William Pike Hall Sr. =

American politician

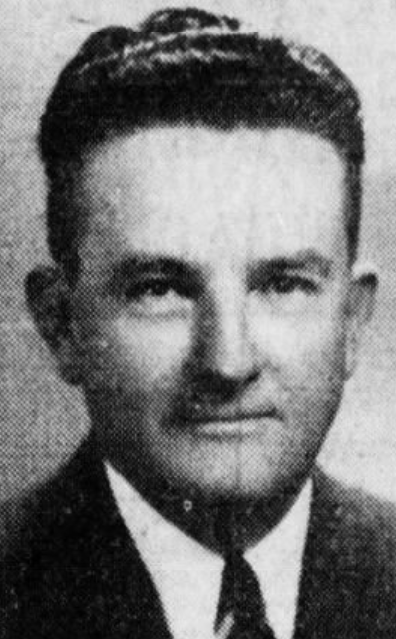
- Hall in 1945

Member of the Louisiana State Senate
- In office 1924–1932
- Preceded by: E. Wayles Browne
- Succeeded by: Cecil Morgan

Personal details
- Born: William Pike Hall; October 19, 1896 Mansfield, Louisiana, U.S.
- Died: December 16, 1945 (aged 49) Caddo Parish, Louisiana, U.S.
- Party: Democratic
- Spouse: Hazel Tucker (m. 1925)
- Children: 2; including Pike Hall Jr.
- Relatives: George W. Jack (uncle); Wellborn Jack (cousin); Whitfield Jack (cousin); Wellborn Jack Jr. (nephew)
- Education: Sewanee: The University of the South; Tulane University; Columbia Law School; Centenary College of Louisiana

William Pike Hall (October 19, 1896 – December 16, 1945) was an American politician. A member of the Democratic Party, he served in the Louisiana State Senate from 1924 to 1932.

== Life and career ==
Hall was born in Mansfield, Louisiana, the son of W. P. Hall, a state district judge, and Ida Jack. He was the nephew of George W. Jack, a United States federal judge, and was the cousin of Wellborn Jack, a Louisiana representative, and Whitfield Jack, a United States Army Reserve major general. He attended Sewanee: The University of the South and Tulane University. He served in the United States Army during World War I, which after his discharge, he attended Columbia Law School, earning his LL.B. degree in 1922.

Hall served in the Louisiana State Senate from 1924 to 1932. After his service in the Senate, he attended and graduated from Centenary College of Louisiana, which after graduating, he worked as an attorney in Shreveport, Louisiana.

== Death ==
Hall died on December 16, 1945, in Caddo Parish, Louisiana, at the age of 49.
