= Whitfield Jack =

United States Army general and attorney (1906–1989)

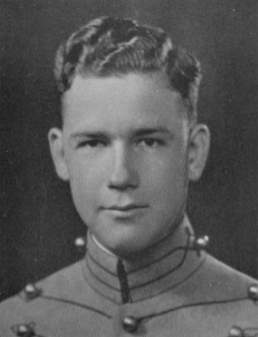
- Jack in 1928
- Born: George Whitfield Jack Jr. July 10, 1906; Shreveport, Louisiana, U.S
- Died: April 23, 1989 (aged 82); Shreveport, Louisiana, U.S.
- Education: Centenary College of Louisiana; United States Military Academy; Tulane University Law School; Yale Law School
- Occupation: Attorney
- Political party: Democratic
- Parent: George W. Jack (father)
- Relatives: Wellborn Jack (brother); William Pike Hall Sr. (cousin); Wellborn Jack Jr. (nephew); Pike Hall Jr. (nephew); Ed Rand (brother-in-law)

George Whitfield Jack Jr. (July 10, 1906 – April 23, 1989) was a United States Army colonel during World War II, and was a United States Army Reserve major general. A member of the Democratic Party, he worked as an attorney in Shreveport, Louisiana.

Jack was born in Shreveport, Louisiana, the son of judge George W. Jack and brother of Wellborn Jack, a Louisiana representative. He was the cousin of William Pike Hall Sr., a Louisiana state senator, and was the uncle of Wellborn Jack Jr., an attorney in Shreveport, Louisiana, and Pike Hall Jr., an associate justice of the Louisiana Supreme Court.
