= John Sidney Garrett =

American politician (1921–2005)

Garrett in a 1967 campaign advertisement

John Sidney Garrett (October 29, 1921 – May 28, 2005) was an American politician who served in the Louisiana House of Representatives from 1948 to 1972 as a Democrat, and as speaker from 1968 to 1972.
