= Lloyd George Teekell =

American politician (1922–1996)

Louisiana State Representative from Rapides Parish
- In office 1953–1960
- Preceded by: James R. Eubank
- Succeeded by: At-large members: Charles K. McHenry; Robert J. Munson Ed Rand

Judge of the 9th Judicial District Court in Alexandria, Louisiana
- In office February 1979 – December 1990

Personal details
- Born: March 12, 1922 Rapides Parish; Louisiana, US
- Died: October 9, 1996 (aged 74) Alexandria, Louisiana
- Resting place: Greenwood Memorial Park in Pineville, Louisiana
- Party: Democratic
- Spouse: Norma Ruth Warren Teekell (1934-1999)
- Children: Jesse Warren Teekell Lisa Teekell-Truett Michele Teekell Barnett
- Education: Louisiana State University; Louisiana State University Law Center
- Occupation: Lawyer and Judge

Lloyd George Teekell (March 12, 1922 – October 9, 1996) was a Democratic politician from Alexandria, Louisiana, who served in the Louisiana House of Representatives from 1953 to 1960. Thereafter from 1979 to 1990, he was a judge of the Louisiana 9th Judicial District Court.

== Biography ==
Teekell was born in rural Elmer in Rapides Parish. Reared in Glenmora in south Rapides Parish, Teekell graduated in 1948 from Louisiana State University in Baton Rouge. At LSU, he was listed in Who's Who Among Students in American Colleges and Universities and was the vice-president of the student body and president of the student senate. In 1951, Teekell obtained his law degree from the Louisiana State University Law Center. Teekell's law school classmates included other later Alexandria political figures U.S. Representative Gillis William Long, Judge Guy E. Humphries Jr., District Attorney Edwin O. Ware, III, and assistant DA and Ware's law partner, Gus Voltz Jr. (c. 1922–2008). Also in the class were later state Representatives George B. Holstead of Ruston and Risley C. Triche of Napoleonville.

Two years out of law school, Teekell won a special election in 1953 to fill the seat vacated by the death in November 1952 of freshman Representative James R. Eubank of Alexandria. He remained in the House for seven years under Governors Robert F. Kennon and Earl Kemp Long

In 1975, Teekell attempted to return to the House in single-member District 26; the one-term incumbent Ned Randolph bowed out to run successfully for the Louisiana State Senate against the veteran incumbent, Cecil R. Blair. Teekell faced a young Democratic attorney, later Republican convert, Jock Scott, in the first ever nonpartisan blanket primary held in Louisiana. A son of United States District Judge Nauman Scott, Jock Scott polled 3,908 votes (54.7 percent) to Teekell's 3,233 ballots (45.3 percent).

On May 3, 1978, Teekell was named president of the Alexandria Bar Association. The next year he joined the district court and served for eleven years until his retirement in 1990.

Teekell operated a ranch near Boyce in north Rapides Parish. He and his wife, the former Norma Ruth "Susie" Warren (1934–1999), had three children, Jesse Warren Teekell of Alexandria, Lisa Teekell-Truett of Plano, Texas, and Michele Teekell Barnett of Baton Rouge. Lloyd and Norma Teekell are interred at Greenwood Memorial Park in Pineville.

Preceded by James R. Eubank	Louisiana State Representative from Rapides Parish; 1953–1960	Succeeded by At-large members: Charles K. McHenry; Robert J. Munson Ed Rand
