= George W. Jack =

American judge

Judge of the United States District Court for the Western District of Louisiana
- In office March 16, 1917 – March 15, 1924
- Appointed by: Woodrow Wilson
- Preceded by: Alexander Boarman
- Succeeded by: Benjamin C. Dawkins Sr.

Personal details
- Born: George Whitfield Jack; November 1, 1875 Natchitoches, Louisiana
- Died: March 15, 1924 (aged 48) Shreveport, Louisiana
- Children: 5; including Whitfield Jack and Wellborn Jack
- Relatives: William Pike Hall Sr. (nephew); Pike Hall Jr. (great-nephew); Wellborn Jack Jr. (grandson)
- Education: Tulane University Law School (LL.B.)

George Whitfield Jack (November 1, 1875 – March 15, 1924) was a United States district judge of the United States District Court for the Western District of Louisiana.

Jack was nominated by President Woodrow Wilson on March 6, 1917, to a seat vacated by Alexander Boarman. He was confirmed by the United States Senate on March 16, 1917, and received commission the same day. Jack's service was terminated on March 15, 1924, due to death.

== Education and career ==
Born on November 1, 1875, in Natchitoches, Louisiana, Jack received a Bachelor of Laws in 1898 from Tulane University Law School. He entered private practice in Shreveport, Louisiana from 1898 to 1910. He was the city attorney for Shreveport from 1910 to 1913. He was the United States Attorney for the Western District of Louisiana from 1913 to 1917.

== Federal judicial service ==
Jack was nominated by President Woodrow Wilson on March 6, 1917, to a seat on the United States District Court for the Western District of Louisiana vacated by Judge Alexander Boarman. He was confirmed by the United States Senate on March 16, 1917, and received his commission the same day. His service terminated on March 15, 1924, due to his death in Shreveport.

== Sources ==
- "Jack, George Whitfield - Federal Judicial Center". www.fjc.gov.

Legal offices
Preceded by Alexander Boarman	Judge of the United States District Court for the Western District of Louisiana; 1917–1924	Succeeded by Benjamin C. Dawkins Sr.
