= Taddy Aycock =

American politician (1915–1987)

Clarence C. "Taddy" Aycock
- Aycock (1963)

45th Lieutenant Governor of Louisiana
- In office May 10, 1960 – May 9, 1972
- Governor: Jimmie H. Davis; John J. McKeithen
- Preceded by: Lether Edward Frazar
- Succeeded by: James Edward "Jimmy" Fitzmorris, Jr.

Louisiana State Representative (St. Mary Parish)
- In office 1952–1960
- Preceded by: C. Russel Brownell, Jr.
- Succeeded by: H. V. Fronden

Speaker of the Louisiana House of Representatives
- In office 1952–1956
- Preceded by: Lorris M. Wimberly
- Succeeded by: Lorris M. Wimberly

Personal details
- Born: January 13, 1915 Franklin, St. Mary Parish; Louisiana, USA
- Died: January 6, 1987 (aged 71)
- Resting place: Franklin Cemetery in Franklin, Louisiana
- Party: Democratic
- Spouse: Elaine Champagne Aycock (1918–2011)
- Children: 6
- Education: Loyola University New Orleans
- Occupation: Attorney
- Awards: Bronze Star

Military service
- Allegiance: United States
- Branch/service: United States Army
- Battles/wars: World War II

Clarence C. "Taddy" Aycock (January 13, 1915 – January 6, 1987), an American conservative Democrat from Franklin in St. Mary Parish, was the only three-term lieutenant governor in 20th century Louisiana history. He served from 1960 to 1972. Aycock failed in his only bid for governor in the 1971 Democratic primary. Few lieutenant governors in Louisiana have been elected directly to the governorship; former Governor Kathleen Babineaux Blanco of Lafayette, is a prominent exception.

Aycock was born in Franklin to Clarence A. Aycock (1885–1948) and the former Inez Crask. He received his law degree in 1937 from Loyola University in New Orleans and launched his law practice in Franklin. He won the Bronze Star while serving in Europe during World War II. In 1945, Aycock married the former Elaine Champagne (1918–2011). They had six children.

== Speaker of the Louisiana House, 1952 ==
Aycock was elected to the Louisiana House of Representatives in 1952 and, though a freshman member, was tapped by incoming Governor Robert F. Kennon as his choice for Speaker. In Louisiana, House Speakers routinely have the recommendation of the governor regardless of the separation of powers between executive and legislative branches. He was reelected to the legislature in 1956 but was not recommended for retention as Speaker by Kennon's successor, Earl Kemp Long. Long instead called Lorris M. Wimberly back as Speaker and then sent Wimberly to head the Department of Public Works in the summer of 1956. Wimberly's abrupt departure led to the accession of Speaker Robert Joseph "Bob" Angelle of St. Martin Parish. Aycock was associated with the anti-Long faction within the Louisiana Democratic Party.

== Election as lieutenant governor, 1960 & 1964 ==
Aycock first won the Democratic nomination for lieutenant governor in 1959–1960. At that time, under the Louisiana Constitution of 1921, the lieutenant governor presided over the state Senate. In the 1974 Constitution, senators chose a "Senate President" to preside over the body, with a ceremonial President Pro Tem in the second position. These Senate presidents also have the recommendation of the governor.

Aycock and then Mayor W. George Bowdon, Jr., of Alexandria led the primary field in December 1959 and went into a January 1960 runoff. Losing candidates included sitting Governor Earl Long, who was actually waging his third campaign (the last two unsuccessful) for lieutenant governor, and Mayor William J. "Bill" White (December 25, 1910 – December 12, 1990) of Gretna in Jefferson Parish, a ticket-mate of State Auditor William J. "Bill" Dodd, then of Baton Rouge. Ernest J. Wright, a labor organizer from New Orleans, was the first African-American candidate for lieutenant governor in the 1963 primary, the first member of his race to seek the office since the era of Reconstruction. Aycock was in the second round of balloting Jimmie Davis' choice for lieutenant governor; his intraparty rival, George Bowdon, was endorsed from the start by the losing runoff candidate, Mayor deLesseps Story Morrison of New Orleans.

In the general election held on April 19, 1960, Aycock defeated Republican Clark Clinton Boardman. Aycock polled 392,421 votes (83.2 percent) to Boardman's 68,186 (14.4 percent). (Vaughn L. Phelps (born 1920), also of Monroe, the nominee of the Louisiana States' Rights Party, received 11,299 votes, the remaining 2.4 percent.) Boardman, at seventy-two, did not wage an active campaign. He was the first Republican in modern times even to seek the lieutenant governor's position. Not until 1987, eleven months after Aycock's death, did a Republican, Paul Hardy of St. Martinville in St. Martin Parish, win the position, which had been otherwise reserved for Louisiana Democrats.

In December 1963 – January 1964, Aycock ran as an "independent" Democrat, meaning that he did not align himself to any gubernatorial candidate. He might have favored Robert Kennon, who was seeking a comeback as governor and who had made him Speaker, but he preferred to make his race alone. Kennon therefore ran with former state Representative Francis Dugas, a lawyer from Thibodaux in Lafourche Parish. Aycock was thrust into a runoff with Chep Morrison's next choice for the position, attorney Claude B. Duval of Houma in Terrebonne Parish. Omitted in the primary runoff was Dugas and McKeithen's ticket-mate, former Mayor Ashton J. Mouton of Lafayette. Duval, an "old-school" orator, was as conservative as Aycock, but he, like his gubernatorial ticket mate Morrison, fared poorly in central and northern Louisiana. In 1968, Duval entered the state Senate for the first of three terms with his former rival, Lieutenant Governor Aycock, as the presiding officer. Duval and Aycock also had something else in common: they came from adjoining south Louisiana parishes, and both were in the anti-Long tradition of Louisiana politics.

== Endorsing Goldwater for president ==
In the fall of 1964, Aycock endorsed Republican presidential nominee Barry M. Goldwater of Arizona, rather than his fellow Democrat, President Lyndon B. Johnson. Governor John J. McKeithen, many of whose backers also voted for Aycock for the second position, remained neutral in the presidential race. The states' two powerful Democratic senators, Allen J. Ellender of Houma and Russell B. Long of Baton Rouge, however, endorsed the Johnson-Humphrey elector slate. Goldwater won Louisiana's ten electoral votes: he was only the second Republican to have done so in modern times, the other having been Dwight D. Eisenhower in 1956.

Several other Democrats joined Aycock in supporting Goldwater: Secretary of State Wade O. Martin, Jr., former Governors Sam Houston Jones of Lake Charles and Robert Kennon of Minden, Caddo Parish Sheriff J. Howell Flournoy, Monroe Mayor W. L. "Jack" Howard, and Plaquemines Parish political "boss" Leander H. Perez. The Republicans held a rally at Tulane University in New Orleans to honor Goldwater and former Democrat-turned-Republican Senator Strom Thurmond of South Carolina as well as the defecting Louisiana Democrats, with then congressional candidate David C. Treen acting as master of ceremonies. Goldwater and Thurmond also made a stop thereafter in Shreveport.

== McKeithen blocks Aycock's aspirations, 1967 ==
Aycock had planned to seek the governorship in the 1967 Democratic primary, but he ran into a major roadblock. In 1966, McKeithen proposed a change to the state's term limits law, and Amendment 1 was adopted into the state Constitution on November 8, 1966. The amendment allows a Louisiana governor to be elected to two consecutive four-year terms, but not a third-term unless he first sits out a term. When Aycock gauged how powerful McKeithen had become, he backed away from a gubernatorial challenge and ran instead for reelection as lieutenant governor, again without tying himself to any gubernatorial candidate. He had no serious opposition for his third term.

== Running for governor, 1971 ==
Aycock presumably could have had a fourth term as lieutenant governor for the asking, but he entered the 1971 Democratic primary for governor. The field was so crowded that the lieutenant governor never made it into the top tier of candidates, headed by then U.S. Representative Edwin Washington Edwards of Crowley, State Senator J. Bennett Johnston, Jr., of Shreveport, then former U.S. Representative Gillis William Long of Alexandria, and former Governor Jimmie Davis, then of Baton Rouge. Aycock, the most conservative candidate in the field, finished in sixth place with 88,465 votes. Davis and Aycock, who had been the winning intraparty ticket in 1960, were opposing each other in 1971. As it turned out, neither was a serious factor in the race.

In 1971, the runoff featured the newer, more moderate candidates, Edwards and Johnston. Edwards narrowly won the second primary and then went on to defeat Republican David Treen, then of Jefferson Parish, in the general election held on February 1, 1972.

Eleven candidates, ten Democratic and one Republican, entered the race to succeed Aycock, including two bankers, outgoing State Representative P.J. Mills of Shreveport and State Senator Jamar Adcock of Monroe, and two candidates from Webster Parish, state Representative Parey P. Branton and businessman Edward Kennon, later a member of the Louisiana Public Service Commission. The eventual Democratic nominee, Jimmy Fitzmorris, a former member of the New Orleans City Council, easily defeated the Republican choice, Treen's running-mate, former state Representative Morley A. Hudson of Shreveport.

== Aycock's legacy ==
Aycock never sought another office but returned to Franklin to practice law. He pushed for the name change of Southwestern Louisiana Institute to the University of Southwestern Louisiana (since University of Louisiana at Lafayette). He supported the French heritage movement and the Acadiana Regional Airport in New Iberia in Iberia Parish.

At the time of his death, he was serving in an advisory capacity with Louisiana Land & Exploration Company. He died in the first few days of 1987, another primary election year for governor and other state constitutional offices. Survivors included his wife; three sons, Joseph Wesley "Jody" Aycock (born 1947), Dr. Kenneth J. Aycock (born 1949), and Larry Thomas Aycock (born 1955) and three daughters, Mrs. Dirk (Barbara) Ory (born 1946), Mrs. Michael (Mary Margaret) Valls (born 1951), and Mrs. Greg (Susan) Fleniken (born 1958); his sister, Mrs. Steven (Mary Ida Aycock) Dupuis (November 17, 1918 – February 27, 2009), and his stepmother, Amy W. Aycock (December 19, 1909 – May 29, 2006). He is interred at Franklin Cemetery in his native Franklin, Louisiana.

Party political offices
Preceded by Lether Edward Frazar	Democratic nominee for Lieutenant Governor of Louisiana; 1960, 1964, 1968	Succeeded by Jimmy Fitzmorris
Louisiana House of Representatives
Preceded by C. Russel Brownell, Jr.	Louisiana State Representative for St. Mary Parish; 1952–1960	Succeeded by H. V. Fronden
Political offices
Preceded by Lorris M. Wimberly	Speaker of the Louisiana House of Representatives; 1952–1956	Succeeded by Lorris M. Wimberly
Preceded by Lether Frazar	Lieutenant Governor of Louisiana; 1960–1972	Succeeded by Jimmy Fitzmorris
