= T. C. Brister =

American politician (1896–1978)

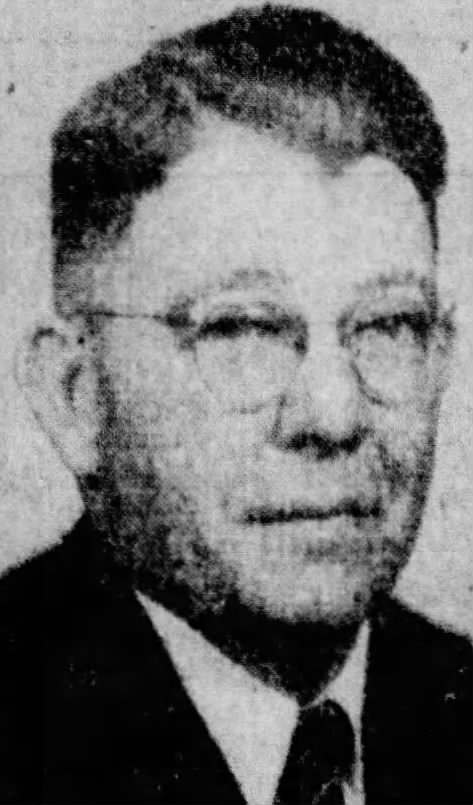
- Brister in 1944

Member of the Louisiana House of Representatives
- In office 1940–1944
- In office 1948–1952
- In office 1968–1972

Personal details
- Born: Tennessee Chesmond Brister; May 28, 1896 Winn Parish, Louisiana, U.S.
- Died: November 26, 1976 (aged 70) Alexandria, Louisiana, U.S.
- Party: Democratic

Tennessee Chesmond Brister (May 28, 1896 – November 26, 1976) was an American politician. A member of the Democratic Party, he served in the Louisiana House of Representatives from 1940 to 1944, from 1948 to 1952 and from 1968 to 1972.

== Life and career ==
Brister was born in Winn Parish, Louisiana, the son of Allen Cicero and Marry Brister. He served in the signal corps in France during World War I, which after his discharge, he worked as a businessman in Pineville, Louisiana.

Brister served in the Louisiana House of Representatives from 1940 to 1944 and again from 1948 to 1952. After his service in the House, in 1954, he ran as a Democratic candidate for mayor of Pineville, Louisiana. He received 442 votes, but lost in the Democratic primary election to candidate S. J. Sasser, who won with 854 votes, which after losing in the mayoral election, he served again in the House from 1968 to 1972.

== Death ==
Brister died on November 26, 1976, at the Rapides General Hospital in Alexandria, Louisiana, at the age of 80.
