= W. C. Friley =

William Christopher "W. C." Friley

First President of Hardin-Simmons University
- In office 1892–1894
- Succeeded by: George O. Thatcher

2nd President of Louisiana College
- In office 1909–1910
- Preceded by: Edwin O. Ware, Sr.
- Succeeded by: Claybrook Cottingham

Personal details
- Born: July 12, 1845 Yazoo County, Mississippi, US
- Died: April 11, 1911 (aged 65) Franklin County, Texas, US
- Resting place: Bryan City Cemetery in Bryan, Texas
- Spouse: Ellen Douglas Friley (married 1872-1911, his death)
- Children: 2
- Education: Mississippi College
- Occupation: College president and clergyman

William Christopher Friley, known as W. C. Friley (July 12, 1845 – April 11, 1911), was a Southern Baptist clergyman and college president. He was from 1892 to 1894 the first president of Hardin-Simmons University in Abilene, Texas, and the second president from 1909 to 1910 of Louisiana College in Pineville, Louisiana. The two assignments were fifteen years apart.

== Background ==
A native of Mississippi, Friley fought as a teenager for the Confederate Army in the American Civil War. He graduated in 1871 from Baptist-affiliated Mississippi College in Clinton, as did two later Louisiana College presidents, Edgar Godbold and Rory Lee.

Friley's first pastorate after receiving his degree was in Yazoo City, Mississippi, and Friley received high marks from the state mission board for his work there.

== Baptist career ==
A clear outline of Friley's life is missing; He seems to have appeared at unlikely places in time across Mississippi, Louisiana, and Texas. He was a Baptist pastor in Monroe, Louisiana, and thereafter he was listed as the correspondence secretary at the Louisiana Baptist Convention. In November 1880, through a series of revivals, helped to establish the First Baptist Church in Opelousas in St. Landry Parish in South Louisiana.

Friley was the founding president of the former Ruston College in Ruston, Louisiana, a forerunner institution to Louisiana Tech University, which lasted for seven years and had annual enrollments of about 250 students. Louisiana Tech was launched in 1894 as "Louisiana Polytechnic Institute", by which time Friley had arrived at and already left Hardin-Simmons. Because it is the first college built in Texas west of Fort Worth, Hardin-Simmons, then known as Simmons College, is often called a "true pioneer institution". While at Hardin-Simmons, he was half-owner of the denominational newspaper, West Texas Baptists, but he sold his interest even before he left Abilene.

In 1899, he was a pastor in Mexia in Limestone County and was in the process of relocating to Rockwall in the Dallas-Fort Worth Metroplex.

== Family and death ==
Friley and his wife, the former Ellen Douglas, also a Mississippi native, had two children. Daughter Mittie K Friley Howell (1878-1962) was born in DeSoto Parish south of Shreveport in northwestern Louisiana. Their son, Charles Edwin Friley (1887-1958), also born in Louisiana, had a highly successful career in higher education. He attended Sam Houston Teachers College in Huntsville, Texas, Baylor University in Waco, Texas, and graduated from Texas A&M University in College Station. Charles Friley received a Master of Science degree from Columbia University in New York City. At Texas A&M, Friley was registrar from 1912 to 1924 and dean of arts and sciences from 1924 to 1932. In 1932, he became the dean of the science division at Iowa State University in Ames, Iowa. He was named vice president of the institution in 1935 and elevated to president in 1936, a position which he held until 1953. Charles Friley's first wife died in their fifth year of marriage and left behind two sons; there was a daughter from the marriage to Vera. He then married for a third time.

Friley died the year after leaving Louisiana College.

Preceded by N/A	First president of Hardin-Simmons University in Abilene, Texas; 1892–1894	Succeeded by George O. Thatcher
Preceded by Edwin O. Ware, Sr.	2nd President of Louisiana College in Pineville, Louisiana; 1909–1910	Succeeded by Claybrook Cottingham
