= List of presidents of Louisiana Christian University =

Louisiana Christian University was established in 1906 by the Louisiana Baptist Convention in Pineville, Louisiana

== List of presidents ==
- 1906-1909 - Edwin O. Ware, Sr.
- 1909-1910 - W. C. Friley
- 1910-1941 - Claybrook C. Cottingham
- 1941 (interim) - Hal Monroe Weathersby
- 1941-1951 - Edgar Godbold
- 1951-1975 - G. Earl Guinn
- 1975-1997 - Robert L. Lynn
- 1997-2004 - Rory Lee
- 2004 (interim) - John "Bud" Traylor
- 2005-2014 - Joe W. Aguillard
- 2014-2015 (interim) - Argile Smith
- 2015-2024 - Rick Brewer (academic)
- 2024-2025 (interim) - David Jeffreys
- 2025-present - Mark Johnson
