= Edgar Godbold =

American clergyman (1879-1952)

Edgar S. Godbold

4th President of Louisiana College
- In office 1942–1951
- Preceded by: Claybrook Cottingham
- Succeeded by: G. Earl Guinn

Personal details
- Born: December 2, 1879 Auburn, Mississippi, US
- Died: November 21, 1952 (aged 72) Alexandria, Louisiana, US
- Resting place: Forest Lawn Memorial Park in Ball, Louisiana
- Spouse(s): (1) Margaret Irene Coleman (m. 1909-1938, her death) (2) Lucie T. Sprecher (m. 1940-1952, his death)
- Education: Mississippi College; University of Chicago
- Occupation: College professor and president Baptist denominational official

Military service
- Battles/wars: World War I

Edgar S. Godbold (December 2, 1879 – November 21, 1952) was an American educator and clergyman. He was the fourth president of Southern Baptist-affiliated Louisiana College in Pineville, Louisiana, a position which he held from 1942 until his retirement in 1951.

== Background ==
A native of Auburn in Lincoln County in southwestern Mississippi, Godbold was the oldest of six children of Thomas Rowan "Tom" Godbold and the former Mary S. "Mollie" Terry. The parents are interred in Amite County, Mississippi.

Godbold graduated from Auburn High School and in 1905 and 1910, respectively, received his bachelor's and master's degrees from Baptist-affiliated Mississippi College in Clinton. He was from 1905 to 1906 a principal in Lawrence County in southwestern Mississippi. From 1906 to 1907, he attended the University of Chicago, from which he received his doctorate. He was called to overseas duty in World War I from 1918 to 1919.

== Baptist career ==
From 1906 to 1912, he was a biology professor at Mississippi College; then, he taught in his field at Louisiana College from 1913 to 1918. From 1912 to 1918, he was the executive secretary of the Louisiana Baptist Education Commission. From 1919 to 1923, Godbold was the corresponding secretary of the executive board of the Louisiana Baptist Convention, based in Alexandria. Decades later near the end of his life, he was from 1950 to 1951 the president of the Louisiana Baptist Convention.

From 1923 to 1929, Godbold was president of Baptist-affiliated Howard Payne College in Brownwood, Texas. After Howard Payne, Godbold was from 1929 to 1942 the executive secretary and then superintendent of the Missouri Baptist Convention, based in the state capital in Jefferson City, Missouri. During this time he was elected in 1930 as the vice president of the Southern Baptist Education Association.

Godbold returned to Louisiana College as president in 1942, having succeeded the interim president and college dean, Hal Monroe Weathersby (1885–1965). Godbold worked to raise funds for capital development, much of which came during the 1950s after he had left the college presidency. He raised $42,000 in forty days to build the three-story men's residence dormitory, Godbold Hall. In 1951, Godbold announced that he would retire as LC president and was succeeded in the summer of that year by G. Earl Guinn. According to Oscar Hoffmeyer's Louisiana College, 75 Years: A Pictorial History, the institution had approached Billy Graham about taking the LC presidency, but Graham declined to be considered in order to continue with his evangelistic ministry. Graham had been introduced to Louisiana Baptists by Leonard F. Sanderson, Sr. (1914-2005), the director of evangelism for the Tennessee Baptist Convention, who later was employed for many years by the Louisiana Baptist Convention.

== Death and legacy ==
In 1909, then residing in Clinton, Mississippi, Godbold married the former Margaret Irene Coleman in Robinsonville, now known as Tunica Resorts, in northwestern Mississippi. She died in 1938 in Kansas City, Missouri. In 1940, at the age of sixty-one while still living in Missouri, Godbold remarried. His second wife, Lucy "Lucie" T. Sprecher (1893-1973), died at the age of eighty in a nursing home in Natchitoches, Louisiana. After Edgar's death, Lucie married a man named Roberts, who predeceased her.

After he left LC, Godbold remained president emeritus with fund-raising duties until his death in 1952. Edgar and Lucie Godbold are interred side by side at Forest Lawn Memorial Park near Pineville in Ball, Louisiana.

The Godbold-Ware Plaza, named for Edgar Godbold and Edwin O. Ware, Sr., the first president of Louisiana College, was dedicated on March 15, 2011 by current LC president Joe W. Aguillard. Remarks can be observed here.

Preceded by Claybrook Cottingham	4th President of Louisiana College in Pineville, Louisiana; 1942–1951	Succeeded by G. Earl Guinn
