= Caskey School of Divinity =

Divinity school affiliated with Louisiana College

- Type: Private
- Active: 2010–2015
- Affiliations: Louisiana College, Louisiana Baptist Convention
- Dean: Charles L. Quarles
- Location: 1140 College Drive, Pineville, Louisiana 71360, Pineville, Louisiana, USA
- Website: divinity.lacollege.edu/

Caskey School of Divinity (active 2010–2015), located in Pineville, Louisiana, was a divinity school affiliated with Louisiana College and the Louisiana Baptist Convention.

== Loss of funding ==
In 2013, the dean of the Caskey Divinity School, Charles Quarles, filed a whistleblower report against the then-president of Louisiana College, Joe W. Aguillard, alleging that Aguillard had misappropriated funds from the Caskey Divinity School for another, unauthorized project. A follow-up investigation by a New Orleans law firm confirmed the whistleblower report, concluding that Aguillard had "intentionally misled the Louisiana College administration, the Board of Trustees, and donors regarding a $10 million pledge from the Cason Foundation.". During an April 30 meeting of Louisiana College's board of trustees, the board voted to exonerate Aguillard despite the whistleblower's reports. The board likewise refused to hear any statements from the Caskey School's primary donor, Edgar Cason. As a result, the Cason foundation revoked any further funding for the Caskey School of Divinity.

After the loss of funding and the Board's exoneration of Aguillard, Charles Quarles offered his resignation from the school. Three other professors associated with the divinity school, including the Associate Dean Jason Hiles, had already been served notice of non-renewal of their contracts as a result of accusations by President Aguillard. Aguillard had claimed, soon after the filing of Quarles' whistleblower report, that the non-renewals were due to a theological conflict concerning calvinism. As a result of the loss of the majority of the school's faculty, many of its full time students withdrew from the Caskey Divinity school. The Associate Dean of Christian Ministry, Argile Smith, took over the responsibilities of Dean at the Caskey School until he succeeded President Aguillard as interim president of Louisiana College in 2016. The Cason Foundation allowed the remaining students to finish their studies without losing their scholarships, but no further scholarships were to be offered (the school's primary source of finances).

== Academics ==
The school offered a Master of Arts (M.A.) in Pastoral Ministry, an M.A. in Biblical & Theological Studies, an Associate of Arts (A.A.) in Pastoral Ministry, and a Certificate in Pastoral Ministry. The school was accredited by the Southern Association of Colleges and Schools (SACS).
