= G. Earl Guinn =

George Earl Guinn

5th President of Louisiana Christian University
- In office 1951 – July 1, 1975
- Preceded by: Edgar Godbold
- Succeeded by: Robert L. Lynn

Personal details
- Born: August 21, 1912 Polk County, Tennessee, US
- Died: June 7, 2004 (aged 91) Alexandria, Rapides Parish
- Resting place: Forest Lawn Memorial Park in Ball, Louisiana
- Spouse(s): (1) Gail Holmes Guinn (died 1969) (2) Neva Norsworthy Guinn (surviving spouse)
- Education: Louisiana College; New Orleans Baptist Theological Seminary
- Occupation: College president and clergyman

George Earl Guinn, known as G. Earl Guinn (August 21, 1912 – June 7, 2004), was from 1951 to 1975 the fifth president of Southern Baptist-affiliated Louisiana Christian University in Pineville, Louisiana.

== Background ==
Guinn was the youngest of six children of Mr. and Mrs. John Guinn; his father (1872-1920) was born and died in Polk County, Tennessee. Guinn graduated from LC in 1937 and was the first LCU president to have been an alumnus of the institution. He obtained his doctorate from New Orleans Baptist Theological Seminary. Prior to his appointment as the LCU president in the summer of 1951, Guinn had been a pastor in several Southern Baptist churches, including First Baptist in Bossier City, Louisiana, and had been an associate professor of theology at Southwestern Baptist Theological Seminary in Fort Worth, Texas.

== LCU President ==
Guinn launched the first construction program since the founding of Louisiana Christian University in 1906. In 1953, LCU alumnus Simon W. Tudor of Pineville donated twenty-seven acres of additional land to the college. Projects completed under Guinn were the Warner Cottage and the Morgan Walker Student Center (now Hixson Student Center), named for Morgan W. Walker Sr., the founder of what became Continental Trailways. A two-story presidents house was constructed in 1956; it is now the Robert L. and Bonnie Lynn Alumni and Development Center named for Guinn's successor as president, Robert L. Lynn and Lynn's wife, Dr. Bonnie Moore Lynn.

Other buildings added during Guinn's period as president were the Richard W. Norton Memorial Library, Tudor Hall, Weathersby Fine Arts Building, H.O. West Physical Education Building, and twenty student apartments. To raise money for a science center, religious education building, and auditorium, Guinn launched a $2 million fundraising operation through the Louisiana Baptist Convention, the first statewide campaign in the history of Southern Baptists to raise funds for Christian higher education. LCU football, first played in 1907, was discontinued in 1969.

The Guinn Religious Education Center, completed in 1973, is named in his honor. It contains classroom space for the religion department, the 300-seat Frances S. Bolton Chapel, and the 1,800-seat Guinn Auditorium, where student assemblies are held. The facility houses the Gladys Tatum West Pipe Organ, a 185-rank, five-manual Moeller organ, among the largest such instruments in the South. The Dr. G. Earl Guinn Endowed Forensic Scholarship is awarded to a student in the debate squad.

Thus far, Guinn is the second longest-serving LCU president, topped by Claybrook Cottingham, the president from 1910 to 1941, who thereafter headed Louisiana Tech University until his accidental death in 1949. Guinn's successor, Robert L. Lynn, served twenty-two years from 1975 to 1997.

In retirement, Guin spoke against the conservative resurgence, which began in 1979 in the Southern Baptist Convention. In a 2001 address to a group called "Mainstream Southern Baptists", he claimed that church donations had declined under conservative control and proclaimed:

...The human hunger for freedom cannot be suppressed forever. This insistence on liberty has been at the heart of the Baptist movement from its inception. ... It is to the Lord Jesus Christ and to Him alone that the soul is accountable.

Apparently those who hatched the scheme to take control of the [national and state] convention and force creedal conformity upon the constituency underestimated the importance of soul freedom in Baptist experience and history. They have captured the apparatus but find themselves losing much of the funding it formerly enjoyed. The victors have no power to tax, and Baptists are not inclined to support that in which representation is denied.

The disenfranchisement of all but the "faithful" has led to a Baptist tea party that is growing in attendance. Baptist universities and colleges in a number of states have broken away in the interest of freedom and excellence in education. State conventions are altering patterns of giving. Several alliances and fellowships have been organized. A number of new seminaries have been created. Some churches have severed their relationship with the SBC. ... An unknown number of Baptists, including pastors, embarrassed and denied opportunity to serve, have gone to other denominations. The invitation of some convention leaders to conform or get out is seen by many as an invitation to the Tea Party and they are accepting. ...

== Personal life and death ==
Guinn was first married to the former Gail Holmes (1914-1969). After her death, he wed the former Neva Norsworthy (born July 1927) of Alexandria, a donor to both Louisiana College and the moderate Baptist publication Baptists Today that opposes the SBC conservative resurgence.

Guinn died in Alexandria at the age of ninety-one. He is interred beside his first wife at Forest Lawn Memorial Park north of Pineville in Ball.

Preceded by Edgar Godbold	5th President of Louisiana College in Pineville, Louisiana; 1951–1975	Succeeded by Robert L. Lynn
