= Rick Brewer (academic) =

American academic

Richard Bennett Brewer Jr.

9th President of Louisiana Christian University
- In office April 7, 2015 – March 8, 2024
- Preceded by: Argile Smith (interim)
- Succeeded by: Dr. David Jeffreys (Acting President)

Personal details
- Born: April 19, 1956 (age 70) New Orleans, Louisiana, U.S.
- Height: 5 ft 3 in (160 cm)
- Spouse: Catherine W. Brewer (former)
- Children: 2
- Parent(s): Richard Sr. and Frances Dike Brewer
- Education: Charleston Southern University (BA); University of South Carolina (MBA)

Richard Bennett Brewer Jr. (born April 19, 1956) is an American academic administrator who is former ninth president of the Southern Baptist-affiliated Louisiana Christian University.

== Early life and education ==
He was born in New Orleans, where his father attended seminary. Brewer earned a Ph.D. in educational leadership from the University of South Carolina and an MBA and BS in history from Charleston Southern University.

== Career ==
He was director of external relations, assistant to the president, and interim director of sports at Charleston Southern University, as well as vice president for planning, student affairs, and athletics. Brewer doubled enrollment from 1,600 to more than 3,400 students at the South Carolina Baptist Convention-affiliated school, increased endowment support, and raised freshman-to-sophomore retention from 50 to 78 percent.

He has been a member of the president's cabinet since 1989. He also was an evaluator for the Southern Association of colleges and Colleges Commission on Colleges (SACS-COC)

In 2015 Brewer become president and chief executive officer of Louisiana Christian University. In 2023, he was elected as the Chairman of the Board of Presidents for both the Louisiana Association of Independent Colleges and Universities and the International Association of Baptist Colleges & Universities.

Brewer addressed nearly $30 million in deferred maintenance and campus refurbishing while adding over $5 million in new technology, exceeded enrollment of 300 new students for the third time in University's history. He has raised more than $37 million from 2805 contributors.

During his administration Louisiana College attained university status and changed its name to Louisiana Christian University.

== Disputes ==
In 2018, a federal lawsuit alleged that Brewer refused to hire a candidate Joshua Bonadona for football coach because of his Jewish heritage. According to news reports, Brewer refused to hire the coach because of his “Jewish blood.” Brewer denied these charges. In 2020, Brewer settled a lawsuit with the Bonadona, without disclosing the terms.

In 2019, Assistant Professor Russell Meek resigned in protest of the failure by the Louisiana University administration to condemn misogynistic comments made by Joshua Joy Dara, a local Baptist pastor and Republican candidate for the Louisiana state Senate. On Feb. 25, 2019, audio recordings of a conversation between Russell Meek and Louisiana College administrators show that the administrators, including Brewer, exerted pressure to conceal criticism of Mr. Dara.

In 2021, news reports indicated that Brewer's administration censors students and faculty on social media. A student was censored by the Louisiana Christian University administrators after asking questions on social media about the policies of the Trump administration. Faculty members have resigned in response to efforts by the Brewer administration to silence their dissent. The 2020-2021 student handbook (p. 104) reads "as a private institution, LCU may restrict “free expression” if it deems that the speech is detrimental or harmful to LCU’s core values and mission."

In 2015, Brewer requested and obtained an exemption to Title IX, a law preventing sexual discrimination, thus allowing the Louisiana Christian University to discriminate against its students on the basis of sexual orientation, gender identity, marital status, pregnancy or receipt of abortion while still receiving federal funds. In 2019, Brewer led LCU to withdraw from the Council of Christian Colleges and Universities (CCCU) because CCCU supported civil rights protections for LGBT students.

Preceded by Argile Smith (interim)	10th President of Louisiana Christian University in Pineville, Louisiana; 2015–	Succeeded by Incumbent
