= Auburn, Mississippi =

- Unincorporated community
- Location within Mississippi Location within the United States
- Coordinates: 31°21′34″N 90°36′28″W
- Country: United States
- State: Mississippi
- County: Lincoln
- Elevation: 430 ft (130 m)
- Time zone: UTC-6 (Central (CST))
  - Summer (DST): UTC-5 (CDT)
- ZIP code: 39664
- Area code: 601
- GNIS feature ID: 666423

Auburn is an unincorporated community located in Lincoln County, Mississippi, United States. Auburn is approximately 5.6 miles (9.0 km) east-northeast of Smithdale near U.S. Route 98.

In 1900, Auburn was home to a high school and masonic lodge and had a population of 57.

A post office operated under the name Auburn from 1890 to 1953.

== Notable person ==
- Edgar Godbold, president of Louisiana College from 1942 to 1951
