= Aguillard =

Aguillard may refer to:

- Edwards vs. Aguillard (1987), a United States Supreme Court case
- Joe W. Aguillard (born July 15, 1956), president of the Southern Baptist-affiliated Louisiana College
