= Charles J. Cavanaugh =

American biologist and academic (1911–2004)

- Born: January 23, 1911; Leesville, Louisiana
- Died: February 18, 2004 (aged 93); Pineville, Louisiana
- Occupations: Biologist; Professor of Biology at the Louisiana College

Charles J. Cavanaugh (23 January 1911 - 18 February 2004) was a biologist and professor of biology at the Louisiana College from 1945 to 1977. He was born in Leesville, Louisiana and died in Pineville, Louisiana. The C. J. Cavanaugh endowed chair in biology was created in his honor.
