= W. H. Johnson =

W. H. Johnson may refer to:

- William Johnson (bishop) (died 1960), the 5th Anglican Bishop of Ballarat, Australia
- William Johnson (surveyor) (died 1883), British surveyor in India
- W. H. Johnson Jr., American politician from Mississippi
