= Argile Smith =

Argile Asa Smith Jr.

9th President Louisiana Christian University
- In office August 1, 2014 (interim) – April 7, 2015
- Preceded by: Joe W. Aguillard; Aguillard became president emeritus for one year effective August 1, 2014.
- Succeeded by: Rick Brewer

Personal details
- Born: July 9, 1955 (age 71) Poplarville, Mississippi, U.S.
- Spouse: Connie Kathleen Saucier Smith (married 1975)
- Children: 3
- Education: William Carey College (BA); New Orleans Baptist Theological Seminary (MDiv, PhD)

Argile Asa Smith Jr. (born July 9, 1955) is an American clergyman and academic administrator who served as interim president of Louisiana Christian University from August 2014 to April 2015.

== Background ==
Born in Poplarville, Mississippi, Smith received a B.A. in Religion from William Carey College in 1977 and a Master of Divinity and Ph.D. from New Orleans Baptist Theological Seminary, thereafter remaining at the seminary as a professor for fourteen years. He became dean of the Southern Baptist-affiliated Louisiana College in 2011, and interim president in August 2014. In 2015, Smith was succeeded as president by Rick Brewer.

Preceded by Joe W. Aguillard	9th president of Louisiana College in Pineville, Louisiana; 2014–2015	Succeeded by Rick Brewer
