= Robert L. Lynn =

American poet (1931–2020)

Robert Lee Lynn

6th President of Louisiana Christian University
- In office July 1, 1975 – 1997
- Preceded by: G. Earl Guinn
- Succeeded by: Rory Lee

Personal details
- Born: November 19, 1931 Oklahoma, US; Reared in Carter County
- Died: September 8, 2020 (aged 88)
- Resting place: Oklahoma, US
- Spouse: Bonnie Moore Lynn
- Children: Susan L. "Susy" Calonkey; Chris Lynn
- Education: Oklahoma Baptist University Columbia University Graduate School of Journalism; Southwestern Baptist Theological Seminary University of Oklahoma
- Occupation: Retired college president; poet

Robert Lee Lynn (November 19, 1931 – September 8, 2020) was a prize-winning poet in suburban Atlanta, Georgia, who from 1975 to 1997 was the sixth president of Southern Baptist-affiliated Louisiana Christian University in Pineville, Louisiana. Previously he was an administrator and interim president at his alma mater, Oklahoma Baptist University, and managing editor for All Church Press in Fort Worth, TX.

== Background ==
Lynn graduated in 1949 from Fox High School in Fox, a small community with a considerable Native American population in Carter County in southern Oklahoma. In 1953, Lynn graduated from Oklahoma Baptist University, a Christian liberal arts college in Shawnee in Pottawatomie County in central Oklahoma. He subsequently attended the Columbia University Graduate School of Journalism in New York City, Southwestern Baptist Theological Seminary in Fort Worth, Texas, and earned his Ph.D at the University of Oklahoma at Norman. From 1952 to 1953, while completing his undergraduate degree at OBU he was a reporter for The Shawnee News-Star. From 1953 to 1967, he was affiliated with the All Church Press in Fort Worth, including a stint as the managing editor.

== College administration ==
From 1967 to 1972, Lynn was the assistant to the OBU president and in 1970 the OBU interim president. From 1973 until 1975, he was the vice president for administration at OBU. Lynn became the LCU president on July 1, 1975, having succeeded G. Earl Guinn, who had served as president since 1951. As it turned out, Lynn was president for just two years less than his predecessor. Lynn often addressed church and civic groups around the state on the advantages of attending a small Christian liberal arts college. At LC, Lynn stressed a sense of community, honest values, and the development of the habit of lifelong learning. Lynn wrote a regular column for the state denominational newspaper, the Baptist Message published by the Louisiana Baptist Convention in Alexandria. It was said that Lynn knew each student by name and some of the students's interests.

At LCU, Lynn served on the commission of the Southern Association of Colleges and Schools and maintained the accreditation of the school throughout his tenure. Lynn served too on the council of presidents of the National Association of Intercollegiate Athletics, the National Association of Independent Colleges and Universities, and the Association of Southern Baptist Colleges and Schools. He was president of the local United Way, vice-president of the Central Louisiana Chamber of Commerce, president of Alexandria Rotary International, and a member of the higher education transition team of Governor Murphy J. Foster, Jr.

Under Lynn's presidency, LCU received national recognition for academic quality and Christian atmosphere. The institution was recognized by U.S. News & World Report, "Barron's 300 Best College Buys", and the Templeton Foundation's Honor Roll for Character-Building Colleges. Upon Lynn's retirement, State Senator B.G. Dyess of Rapides Parish, honored him with a resolution which cites Lynn's achievement at the institution and within the community.

The former Louisiana Christian University president's home, constructed in 1956 and last occupied by the Lynns as a residence, is now the Robert L. and Bonnie Lynn Alumni and Development Center. Efforts are underway to have the two-story brick structure placed on the state list of historic places.

When Lynn left LCU, fundamentalists in the denomination said that he had moved the institution away from its biblical and moral roots. Lynn, however, said that the factionalism in the Louisiana Baptist Convention played no part in his decision to retire.

== Poetry ==
After completing twenty-two years as LCU president, Lynn concentrated on his poetry in his home in Duluth, Georgia. His interest in poetry began when he was the LCU president after he noticed that many students seemed to prefer verse to speeches. He kept a notebook on his bed stand to record creative bursts which came to him in the middle of the night. Hence he titled one volume of his poetry, Midnight Verse. His poems have been inspired by people who came to his mind while sleeping or events and scenes which left a particular impression. Lynn has either written or edited ten books, including his first volume of poetry entitled Service Yields Its Own Rewards. For three years, he was the editor of The Reach of Song, a collection of the Georgia Poetry Society.

Lynn read his poems in such forums as the "Poetry in the Schools Program" of the Georgia Poetry Society. In 2010, for instance, he presented poems to eight hundred sixth graders in Gwinnett County, Georgia. He was affiliated with poetry societies in Oklahoma, Georgia, and Alabama. One of Lynn's best known poems is "Cancer Is So Limited", written in 2007 and published in the 2013 book Cancer Is So Limited and Other Poems of Faith.

Lynn and his wife, Dr. Bonnie Moore Lynn (also born 1931), resided in Norman, in Cleveland County, Oklahoma.

Preceded by G. Earl Guinn	6th President of Louisiana College in Pineville, Louisiana; 1975–1997	Succeeded by Rory Lee
