= KZLC-LP =

- Pineville, Louisiana; United States
- Frequency: 95.5 MHz
- Branding: The Voice of Louisiana College

Programming
- Format: Christian
- Affiliations: Louisiana College

Ownership
- Owner: Louisiana College

History
- First air date: 1992

Technical information
- Licensing authority: FCC
- Facility ID: 123498
- Class: L1
- ERP: 37 watts
- HAAT: 48.5 meters (159 ft)
- Transmitter coordinates: 31°19′24.00″N 92°25′48.00″W

Links
- Public license information: LMS
- Website: Official Website

KZLC-LP (95.5 FM) is an American radio station broadcasting a Christian-based variety format. Licensed to Pineville, Louisiana, United States, the station is owned by Louisiana Christian University.
