= Roy Hebron =

Roy Eugene Hebron (born September 4, 1954) is a former mayor of Ball in Rapides Parish, Louisiana.

A Democrat, Hebron was initially elected mayor in 1986. In 2011, he pleaded guilty to one count of conspiracy to defraud the Federal Emergency Management Agency and was sentenced to imprisonment for a term of four years. The guilty plea stemmed from Hebron's having overbilled FEMA regarding the reconstruction from Hurricane Gustav in 2008. Town clerk Brenda Kimball was also imprisoned in the case. Four other municipal figures, including former police Chief Jay Barber, pleaded guilty to various charges to defraud the U.S. government but avoided jail time.

Judge Dee D. Drell of the United States District Court for the Western District of Louisiana in Alexandria ordered Hebron to pay $105,566 in restitution to FEMA, a fine of $25,000 fine, and $100 special assessment, collectively totaling $130,666. Hebron's life insurance was garnished to pay part of the amount owed. In 2012, Hebron received notice that his municipal retirement account would be garnished to secure the remaining $68,237 he owes for theft. He was released from the minimum security prison in Pensacola, Florida, on December 19, 2014.

Hebron's popularity in Ball was affirmed once again when he was handily elected on November 6, 2018, to return to the mayoral office. He handily unseated the Republican incumbent, Neil S. Kavanagh, 817 votes (56 percent) to 380 (26 percent). Another 254 votes (18 percent) went to a second Republican candidate, Gene Decker. However, Hebron was unable to be sworn in because of a constitutional amendment passed in the November 2018 election which prevents felons from holding office for five years after the conclusion of their sentences.
