= Rory Lee =

American Southern Baptist clergyman, educator and college administrator

Rory R. Lee

7th President of Louisiana Christian University
- In office 1997–2004
- Preceded by: Robert L. Lynn
- Succeeded by: Joe W. Aguillard

Personal details
- Born: April 14, 1949 (age 77) Place of birth missing
- Spouse: Janet S. Lee
- Children: Lauren and Lacey Lee
- Education: Mississippi College; University of Mississippi

Rory R. Lee (born April 14, 1949) is a Southern Baptist clergyman, educator, and former college administrator and president who has been since 2004 the executive director of Baptist Children's Village, a statewide ministry based in Ridgeland, Mississippi, which provides group homes for children along with psychological and spiritual counseling for families.

== Background ==
In 1971, Lee received his bachelor's degree in Bible studies from Mississippi College in Clinton, Mississippi, where he was already working as an admissions counselor while still studying for his degree. In 1973, he obtained his master's degree in counseling from MC. Thereafter, he became the dean of men and from 1976 to 1994 the bi-vocational pastor of Antioch Baptist Church in Hazlehurst in Copiah County south of the capital city of Jackson. During his tenure at Antioch, the church grew in membership, missions, stewardship, and Bible studies. In the meantime, Lee in 1984 earned his doctorate from the University of Mississippi at Oxford.

Lee and his wife, Janet, have two children, Lauren and Lacey.

== College administration ==
At Mississippi College, Lee was successively dean of admissions, director of development, vice president for development, and from 1989 to 1997 the vice president for institutional advancement. In 1993, Lee was named for eleven months the MC interim president after president Lewis Nobles was removed for the embezzlement of college funds. Lee resigned from the pastorate at Antioch to devote full-time to the interim college presidency. Lee remained as vice president for institutional advancement for two years after a new president was selected, but in 1996, he left MC to begin a one-year stint as president of Baptist-affiliated William Carey College in Hattiesburg, Mississippi. There, Lee coordinated the strategic planning process of the institution and formulated telecommunications and faculty development plans.

In 1997, Lee was named the seventh president of Louisiana Christian University in Pineville, Louisiana. Pastor Thomas James "Jim" Spencer (1938-2006) of Kingsville Baptist Church in Ball, chairman at the time of the LCU trustees, said that the unanimous selection of Lee to replace the retiring Robert L. Lynn had been "a unifying effort for the board. Dr. Lee is an outstanding young man who is both a professional college administrator and a dedicated Christian servant. ... that all Louisiana Baptists can rally around and support."

At LCU, Lee worked for the construction of new facilities on campus, the addition of two new sports to the athletic program, and an increase in the number of faculty members with terminal degrees in their field. He described his view of academic freedom as "absolutely critical to academic excellence in a college. Teachers must have the freedom to teach their disciplines. But at a Christian college, academic freedom is bordered by the mission statement of the college."

Controversy preceded Lee's decision to resign as president effective in June 2004. In December 2003, LCU trustees revised the college policy on academic freedom, a decision made after Lee had removed two books used in a class from the campus bookstore. Lee took that action after a student complained about a love scene and profanity in both books. The revised policy requires that faculty submit their textbooks for approval by the department chairperson and the vice president for academic affairs.

== Baptist Children's Village ==
After seven years, Lee left LCU to assume his current position in Ridgeland in Madison County in the Jackson metropolitan area as the executive director of the Baptist Children's Village, which provides short-term and long-term care for abandoned, neglected, or abused children. Lee said that his duties can make one "very sad and very angry. But we’ve learned not to dwell on those negative feelings. Instead, we focus on showing Christ's love not only to the children, but also to their families. This is a healing ministry." Lee said that his life goal is to have "no repeat customers" and to eliminate the need for a facility like Baptist Children's Village.

Lee said that his preparation for his ministerial and administrative duties came through his longstanding ties to Mississippi College, which in 2011 named him "Alumnus of the Year".

Preceded by Robert L. Lynn	7th President of Louisiana Christian University in Pineville, Louisiana; 1997–2004	Succeeded by Joe W. Aguillard
