= W. H. Johnson Jr. =

American politician and lawyer from Mississippi

William Harvey Johnson Jr.
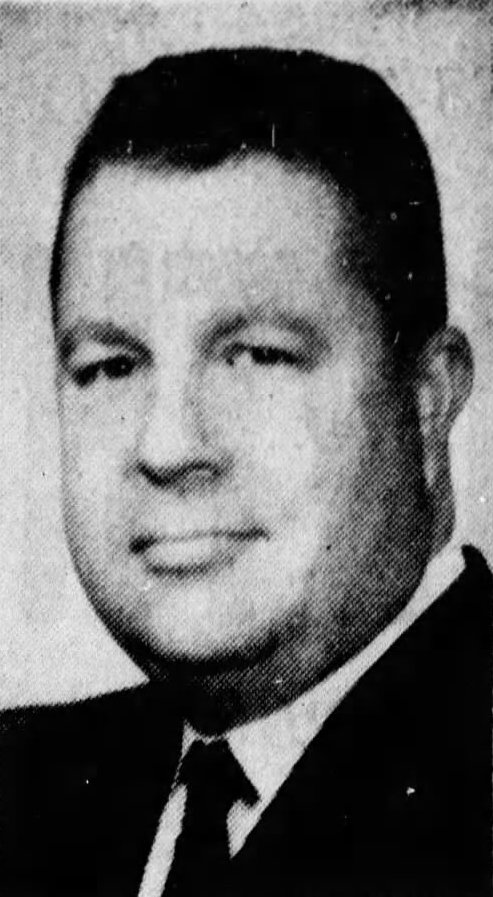
- Johnson circa 1962

Member of the Mississippi House of Representatives
- In office 1952–1964

Personal details
- Born: May 10, 1919 Ball, Louisiana, US
- Died: March 22, 2004 (aged 84) Jackson, Mississippi, US
- Education: East Central Junior College; Mississippi College (BA); University of Mississippi (LLB)

Military service
- Allegiance: United States
- Branch/service: Army Air Corps
- Years of service: 1941–1945
- Rank: Major
- Unit: 381st Bomber group

William Harvey Johnson Jr. (May 10, 1919 – March 22, 2004) was an American politician and lawyer from Mississippi. He served for Newton County in the Mississippi House of Representatives from 1952 to 1964.

== Biography ==
William Harvey Johnson Jr. was born on May 10, 1919, in Ball, Louisiana, to William Harvey Johnson Sr. and Lela Johnson. He attended Harperville High School, graduating in 1935. He then graduated from East Central Junior College in 1937 and received his B.A. from Mississippi College in 1939.

Johnson enlisted in the U.S. Army Air Corps in 1941 and served for four years in the European theatre of World War II. He started as an aviation cadet but rose to the rank of major, and ultimately earned two Distinguished Flying Crosses, four Air Medals, and a Presidential Citation.

Johnson enrolled at University of Mississippi Law School in January 1946, and earned his LLB in January 1948. Later that year, he opened his own law office in Decatur, Mississippi.

In 1952, he was elected to the Mississippi House of Representatives representing Newton County. According to his campaign ads, he was pro-segregation. He served in the house for twelve years. He also was elected as district attorney for the 8th Circuit Court District of Mississippi in 1963.

Johnson continued to run his private practice until his retirement in 1999. On March 22, 2004, Johnson died at St. Dominic Jackson Memorial Hospital in Jackson, Mississippi. His funeral was held on March 25, and he was buried in Decatur Cemetery.
