= Ball, Louisiana =

- Town
- Town of Ball
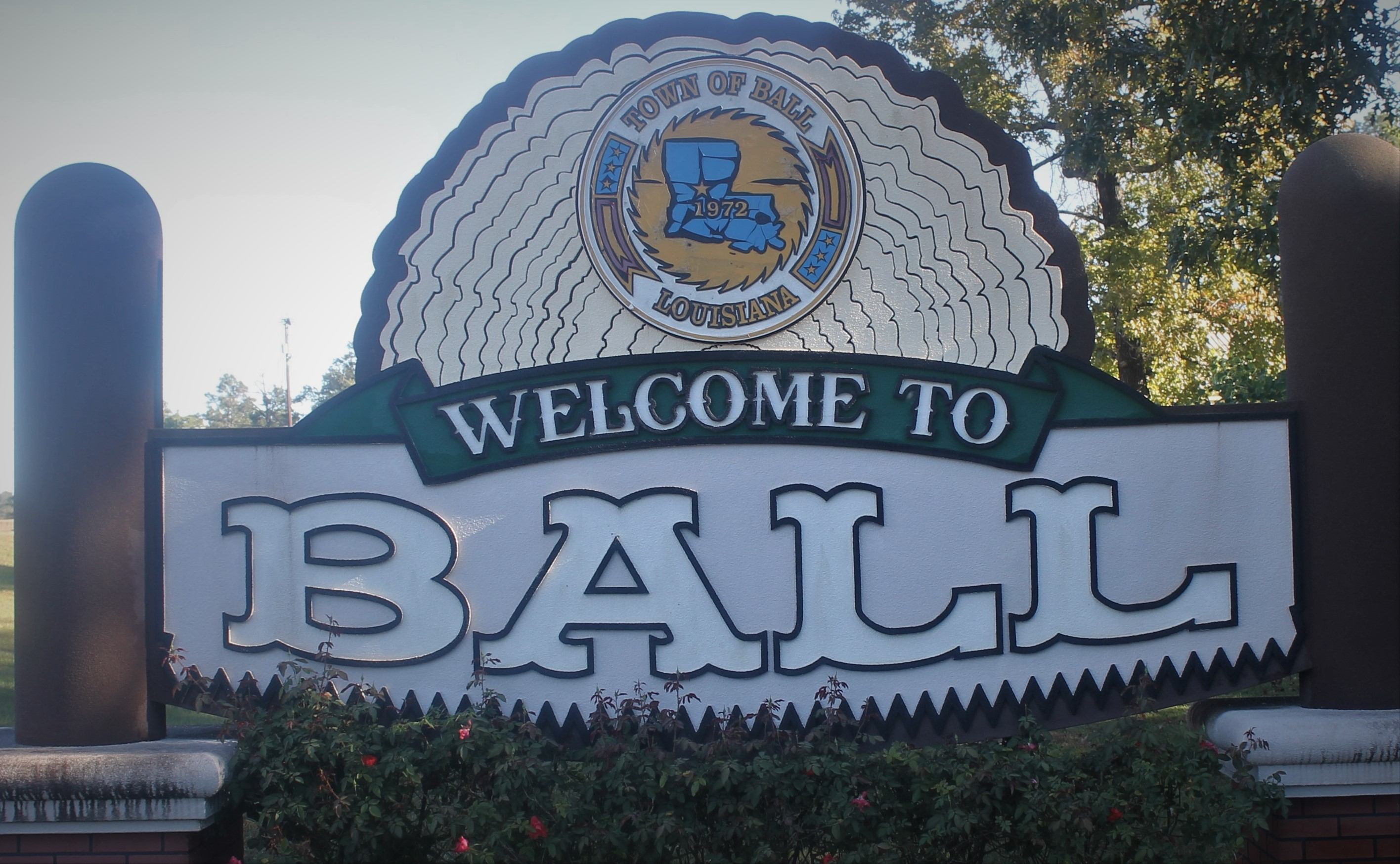
- Welcome sign for Ball (established 1972)

- Location of Ball in Rapides Parish, Louisiana.

- Location of Louisiana in the United States
- Coordinates: 31°24′40″N 92°23′50″W
- Country: United States
- State: Louisiana
- Parish: Rapides
- Incorporated: May 1972

Area
  - Total: 7.95 sq mi (20.59 km^{2})
  - Land: 7.95 sq mi (20.59 km^{2})
  - Water: 0 sq mi (0.00 km^{2})
- Elevation: 161 ft (49 m)

Population (2020)
  - Total: 3,961
  - Rank: RA: 3rd
  - Density: 498.2/sq mi (192.34/km^{2})
- Time zone: UTC-6 (CST)
  - Summer (DST): UTC-5 (CDT)
- ZIP code: 71405
- Area code: 318
- FIPS code: 22-04055
- GNIS feature ID: 2405204
- Website: https://www.townofball.com/

Ball is a town in Rapides Parish, just north of Pineville, Louisiana, United States. Established in 1972, it is part of the Alexandria, Louisiana Metropolitan Statistical Area. As of the 2020 census, Ball had a population of 3,961.

== History ==
Ball had its start as a logging town with a sawmill.

The earliest record of settlers in Ball dates to between 1840 and 1863. In 1893 Captain Chittenden Edwin Ball, a native of Union County, Kentucky, who captained steamboats up the Red River to Alexandria, named a sawmill town after himself. The captain settled in Rapides Parish in the late 1880s, where he established the Sweet Home Mill. In 1940 Camp Livingston was constructed, bringing with it job opportunities and a population boom. The number of military personnel stationed at Camp Livingston reached a peak of 42,500 in 1942. The end of World War II in 1945 brought about the closing of the base but many families decided to stay in the community. Discussion of incorporation began in the 1960s and in May 1972 incorporation was completed with the finalization of the town charter under "The Lawrason Act".

In 2011, former mayor Roy Hebron, a Democrat, was sentenced to four years imprisonment for corruption. Hebron intended to return to the office after his election on November 6, 2018, when he handily unseated the Republican incumbent, Neil S. Kavanagh, 817 (56 percent) to 380 (26 percent). Another 254 votes (18 percent) went to a second Republican candidate, Gene Decker. However, Hebron was unable to be sworn in because of a constitutional amendment passed in the November 2018 election which prevents felons from holding office for five years after the conclusion of their sentences.

== Geography ==
According to the United States Census Bureau, the town has a total area of 8.0 square miles (21 km^{2}), all land.

=== Climate ===
This climatic region is typified by large seasonal temperature differences, with warm to hot (and often humid) summers and cold (sometimes severely cold) winters. The heat has a heavy feel and can be dangerous due to the heat index which is caused by humid air. According to the Köppen Climate Classification system, Ball has a humid subtropical climate, abbreviated "Cfa" on climate maps.

Climate data for Ball, Louisiana
Month	Jan	Feb	Mar	Apr	May	Jun	Jul	Aug	Sep	Oct	Nov	Dec	Year
Mean daily maximum °F (°C)	55 (13)	60 (16)	68 (20)	77 (25)	82 (28)	89 (32)	91 (33)	89 (32)	86 (30)	77 (25)	66 (19)	59 (15)	75 (24)
Mean daily minimum °F (°C)	35 (2)	37 (3)	44 (7)	53 (12)	59 (15)	66 (19)	69 (21)	68 (20)	64 (18)	51 (11)	42 (6)	37 (3)	51 (11)
Average precipitation inches (mm)	5.1 (130)	4.2 (110)	5.1 (130)	4.3 (110)	5.1 (130)	2.7 (69)	5.1 (130)	3.9 (99)	3.8 (97)	3 (76)	3.9 (99)	6.5 (170)	52.9 (1,340)
Source: Weatherbase

== Demographics ==
Historical population
Census	Pop.	Note	%±
1980	3,405		—
1990	3,305		−2.9%
2000	3,681		11.4%
2010	4,000		8.7%
2020	3,961		−1.0%
2025 (est.)	3,793	▼	−4.2%
Ball Census

=== 2020 census ===
As of the 2020 census, Ball had a population of 3,961. The median age was 38.3 years. 25.0% of residents were under the age of 18 and 16.9% of residents were 65 years of age or older. For every 100 females there were 89.3 males, and for every 100 females age 18 and over there were 83.5 males age 18 and over.

78.9% of residents lived in urban areas, while 21.1% lived in rural areas.

There were 1,578 households in Ball, including 877 family households. Of all households, 35.7% had children under the age of 18 living in them, 43.9% were married-couple households, 16.7% were households with a male householder and no spouse or partner present, and 33.1% were households with a female householder and no spouse or partner present. About 26.8% of all households were made up of individuals and 12.2% had someone living alone who was 65 years of age or older.

There were 1,713 housing units, of which 7.9% were vacant. The homeowner vacancy rate was 1.2% and the rental vacancy rate was 6.1%.

Ball racial composition
Race	Number	Percentage
White (non-Hispanic)	3,058	77.2%
Black or African American (non-Hispanic)	455	11.49%
Native American	30	0.76%
Asian	21	0.53%
Pacific Islander	1	0.03%
Other/Mixed	236	5.96%
Hispanic or Latino	160	4.04%

=== 2000 census ===
As of the census of 2000, there were 3,681 people, 1,435 households, and 1,057 families residing in the town. The population density was 458.1 inhabitants per square mile (176.9/km^{2}). There were 1,524 housing units at an average density of 189.7 per square mile (73.2/km^{2}). The racial makeup of the town was 96.74% White, 1.58% African American, 0.65% Native American, 0.35% Asian, 0.03% Pacific Islander, 0.22% from other races, and 0.43% from two or more races. Hispanic or Latino of any race were 1.41% of the population.

There were 1,435 households, out of which 37.8% had children under the age of 18 living with them, 53.0% were married couples living together, 16.7% had a female householder with no husband present, and 26.3% were non-families. 23.1% of all households were made up of individuals, and 8.7% had someone living alone who was 65 years of age or older. The average household size was 2.55 and the average family size was 2.97.

In the town, the population was spread out, with 27.9% under the age of 18, 10.2% from 18 to 24, 28.3% from 25 to 44, 22.9% from 45 to 64, and 10.6% who were 65 years of age or older. The median age was 34 years. For every 100 females, there were 90.7 males. For every 100 females age 18 and over, there were 82.3 males.

The median income for a household in the town was $31,500, and the median income for a family was $38,588. Males had a median income of $31,667 versus $20,323 for females. The per capita income for the town was $14,178. About 10.1% of families and 13.6% of the population were below the poverty line, including 15.0% of those under age 18 and 7.6% of those age 65 or over.

== Education ==
Ball residents are zoned to Rapides Parish School Board schools. Ball is home to two elementary schools within the city limits that residents may go to, Ball Elementary School and Paradise Elementary School. Some residents may also go to three nearby schools in Tioga: Tioga Elementary School, Tioga Junior High School, and Tioga High School.

== Highway ==
- U.S. Route 165

== Notable people ==
- W. H. Johnson Jr., state legislator in Mississippi

== Gallery ==
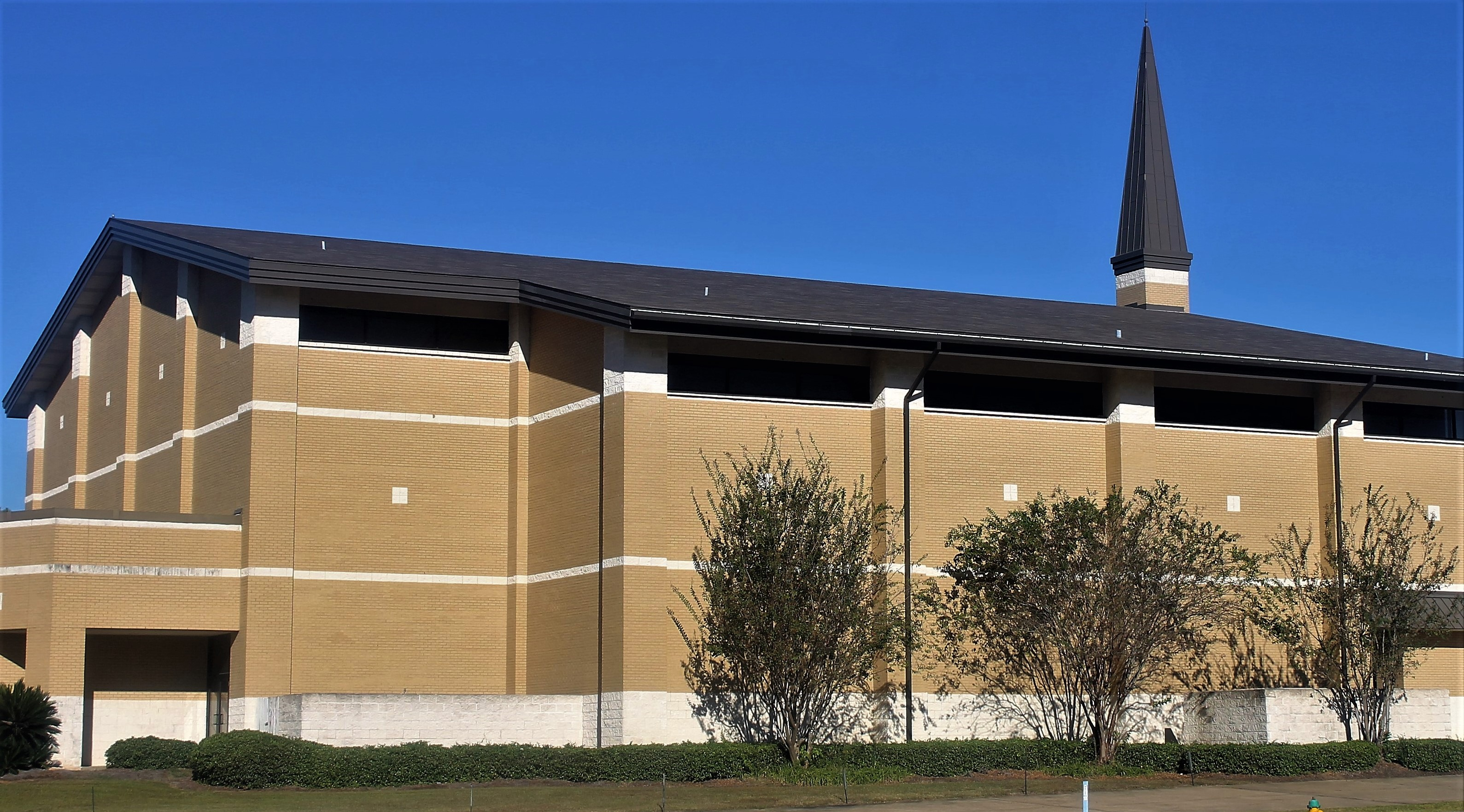
Kingsville Baptist Church, a Southern Baptist congregation at 3911 Monroe Highway in Ball, is located across from Forest Lawn Memorial Park.

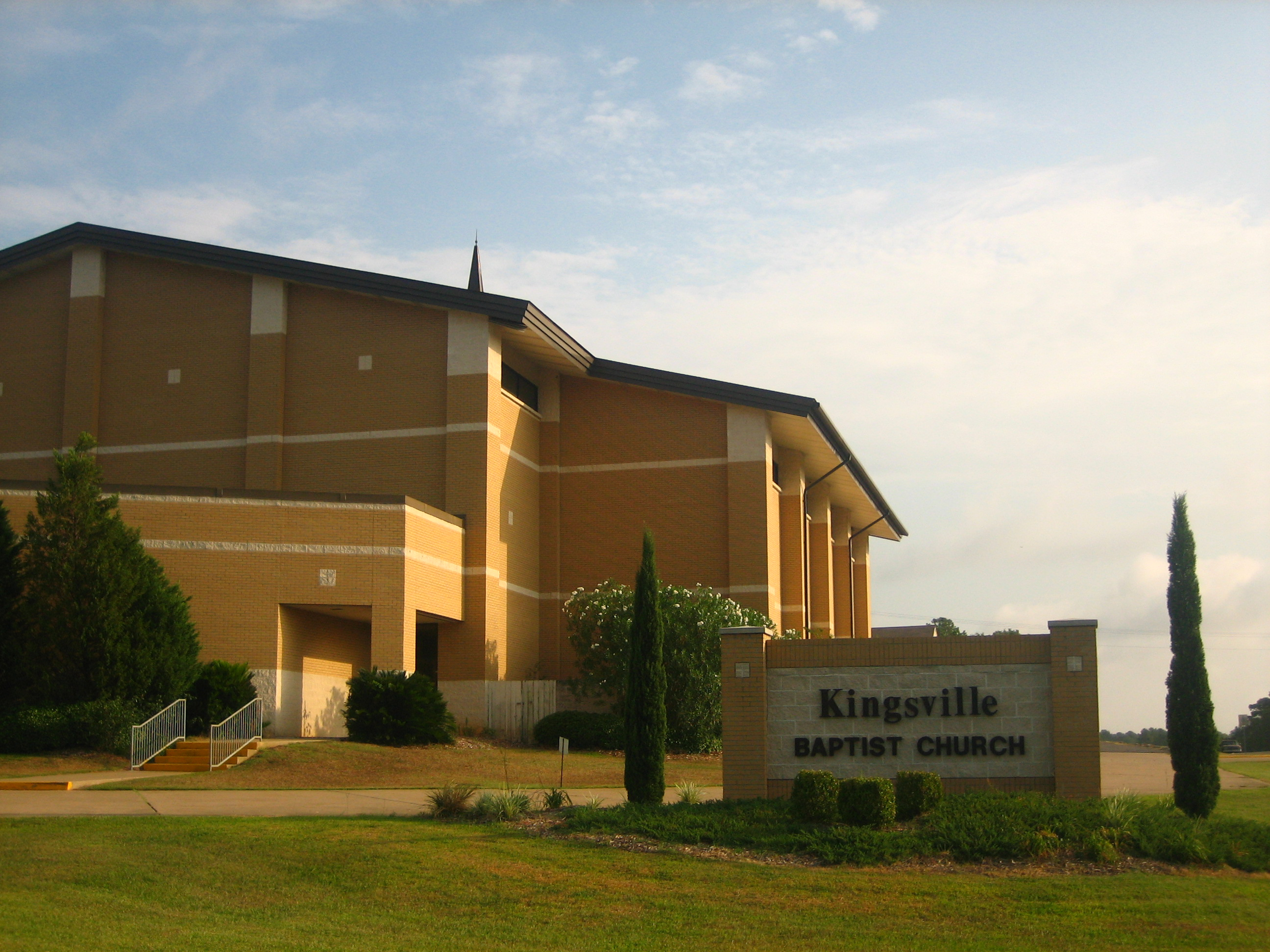
Kingsville Baptist Church (front side).
