= Louisiana Christian University =

Baptist university in Pineville, Louisiana, US

Coordinates: 31°19′31″N 92°25′36″W

- Former names: Louisiana College (1906–2021)
- Motto: Latin: Deo, Veritati, Patriae
- Motto in English: God, Truth, Country
- Type: Private college
- Established: October 3, 1906; 119 years ago
- Founder: Edwin O. Ware
- Religious affiliation: Louisiana Baptist Convention (Southern Baptist Convention)
- Endowment: US$38.8 million
- President: Mark Johnson
- Provost: Henry Robertson
- Students: 936 (fall 2024)
- Undergraduates: 763 (fall 2024)
- Postgraduates: 173 (fall 2024)
- Location: Pineville, Louisiana, United States
- Campus: Suburban, 81 acres (33 ha)
- Colors: Orange & Royal Blue
- Nickname: Wildcats and Lady Wildcats
- Sporting affiliations: NAIA – RRAC (primary); NAIA – Sooner (football)
- Website: lcuniversity.edu
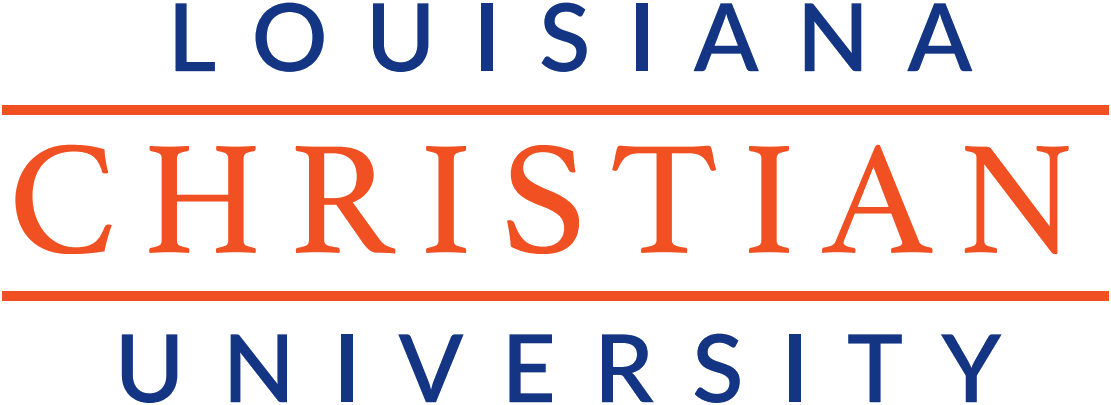

Louisiana Christian University (LCU) is a private Baptist university in Pineville, Louisiana, United States. It is affiliated with the Louisiana Baptist Convention (Southern Baptist Convention). Founded in 1906 as Louisiana College, it took its current name in 2021. The university enrolled 936 students in 2024. The athletic teams are known as the Louisiana Christian Wildcats and Lady Wildcats.

== History ==
=== Early history ===
Louisiana Christian University was founded as Louisiana College on October 3, 1906, in Pineville, across the Red River from the larger city of Alexandria. The college began in tents with four professors and nineteen students.

Baptist clergyman and educator Edwin O. Ware, Sr., is considered to have been the principal founder of the institution. From 1906 to 1907, Ware was the college's financial agent and its first president from 1908 to 1909. LCU is the successor to two earlier Louisiana Baptist schools: Mount Lebanon College and Keatchie Female College. After a history beset with financial difficulties, both schools came under the control of the Louisiana Baptist Convention in 1899. The state convention selected an Education Commission to administer the schools, understanding that both would be succeeded by a more centrally located institution as soon as a suitable campus could be chosen. When Louisiana College was opened in 1906, Mount Lebanon College closed, followed by Keatchie a few years later. Since the first class of nineteen students in 1906, more than ten thousand students have graduated.

In 1920, the school completed Alexandria Hall. It is now listed on the National Register of Historic Places.

Until 1921, Louisiana College was administered by the Education Commission. The new charter established a board of trustees. The first administrative head of Louisiana College was W. F. Taylor, whose title was faculty chair. Since its opening under President Edwin Ware, LC has had nine presidents:

- W. C. Friley, 1909–1910, also the first president of Hardin–Simmons University in Abilene, Texas
- Claybrook Cottingham, 1910-1942
- Edgar Godbold, 1942-1951
- G. Earl Guinn, 1951-1975
- Robert L. Lynn, 1975-1997
- Rory Lee, 1997-2005
- Joe W. Aguillard, 2005-2014
- Argile Smith, 2014-2015 (interim)
- Rick Brewer, 2015–2024
- David Jeffreys, 2024-2025 (interim)
- Mark Johnson, 2025-present

=== Since 2000 ===
In 2012, the Louisiana Baptist Convention approved Louisiana College to seek $12 million in donations from member churches within the state as part of the institution's $50 million capital improvements program. The $12 million had been intended to improve on-campus housing. Although the campaign has since been abandoned, many residence halls were renovated shortly after the inauguration of Rick Brewer as a part of his "Campus Beautification" campaign. LC ended its fiscal year on July 31, 2012, with a $1.3 million deficit; the institution spent $30.5 million during that time but collected only $29.2 million in revenues.

In 2013, LCU reported an enrollment growth of 50 percent relative to 2006.

In December 2013, the Southern Association of Colleges and Schools (SACS) reaffirmed LC's regional accreditation after two years of warning status. Less than three months later, SACS announced that it would investigate after LC officials were accused of having submitted documents that contain forged signatures and other inconsistencies in its official reports to the agency. Three months later, SACS placed the university on probation because of an "'integrity issue,' as well as its failure to comply with the accreditor's standards regarding 'external influence,' personnel appointments, administrative staff evaluations, control of finances, and its administration of federal student aid funds."

Some students called for a strike against Aguillard on March 24, 2014, at LC's Guinn Auditorium. Three days later, LC trustees asked Aguillard to resign and the following day ten LC trustees released a public letter critical of his leadership.

On April 15, 2014, the trustees removed Aguillard as president and named Argile Smith, the associate dean of the Christian ministry of the Caskey School of Divinity, as the interim leader and began the search for a permanent successor.

The college was granted an exception to Title IX in 2015, which allows it to discriminate against LGBT students for religious reasons.

In 2020, the college was admitted into the National Association of Intercollegiate Athletics.

On September 24, 2020, President Rick Brewer announced that the college would be undergoing an organizational restructuring. This restructuring included naming a Provost, a first for the historic institution. Cheryl Clark, previously serving as Vice President of Academic Affairs, was named provost.

At the start of the fall semester in 2021, the college welcomed its largest first-year class ever, with 350 students showing up for the opening day of Wildcat Welcome Weekend: the largest first-year class in the school's 115-year history.

Louisiana College in Pineville formally announced its new name Louisiana Christian University on November 16, 2021, during a meeting of the Louisiana Baptist Convention, according to a Wednesday news release, although in November 2022 it was brought to the attention of the Louisiana Baptist Convention that the school had failed to change its name with the state of Louisiana. A motion was brought before the convention to refer to LC by its legal name (Louisiana College) until such a time as the school's legal name had changed, but the motion was denied.

=== Dispute over divinity school ===
On December 14, 2010, the LC trustees received a $1 million contribution from an anonymous foundation to launch a divinity school on the Pineville campus. The school was named the Caskey School of Divinity after a Southern Baptist minister who "tirelessly worked and evangelized in Louisiana". The founding dean for the school was Charles Quarles. Louisiana College was able to grant up to the master's degree under Level 3 status of the Southern Association of Colleges and Schools (SACS). The school began classes in fall 2011. Quarles explained the goals of the Caskey School of Divinity:

Louisiana College will establish a divinity school that will train coming generations of Christian leaders:

1. To correctly handle the word of truth (2 Tim 2:15)
2. To preach the word (2 Tim 4:2)
3. To emphasize the great truths of the Christian faith in their preaching and teaching(1 Tim 4:16)
4. To share the gospel passionately with the lost (2 Tim 4:5)
5. To model outstanding Christian character (1 Tim 3).

— Charles Quarles

Meanwhile, funding for the divinity school came into question. The Cason Foundation, which donated $5 million to LC to fund the divinity school, announced that it will no longer financially support the college because of "actions of President (Joe) Aguillard which we believe to be unethical and potentially illegal." Edgar Cason and his wife, Flora Jean Caskey Cason, who established the foundation in honor of her father, informed LC trustees by letter on April 15 that it would end its ties to LC. A probe into the matter by a law firm in New Orleans claims that Aguillard had improperly diverted some $60,000 in divinity school donations to LC projects in Tanzania, Africa. Five LC board members, however, have defended Aguillard and maintained that he did not act improperly regarding the funds. Cason questioned why the LC trustees did not permit him to address the board at its March meeting.

A special committee of the trustees voted 4–3 to clear Aguillard of wrongdoing regarding the diverted funds. One of the dissenting votes was cast by Tony Perkins, a former member of the Louisiana House of Representatives and the president of the Family Research Council. Perkins subsequently questioned in an email to Kris Chenier, chair of the special panel and the pastor of the Trinity Heights Baptist Church in Shreveport, why the committee had implied that the vote to clear Aguillard had been unanimous rather than by the one-vote margin. On April 30, the trustees called a special meeting to consider the dispute over the divinity school. Trustees voted for the time being to retain Aguillard as president and laid spiritual hands over him. It was not disclosed how many of the thirty-four trustees were present for the special meeting or the vote breakdown, but the trustees declared the matter closed for further consideration.

== Campus ==
Louisiana Christian University is on an 81-acre (33 ha) campus in Pineville. The school has twenty-five academic and residential buildings, which include:

- Alexandria Hall, constructed in 1920, houses most of the LC administrative offices and the departments of history, business, human behavior, teacher education, English, and foreign languages. Within Alexandria Hall is the Ruth O'Quinn Center for Liberal Arts and Professional Studies. Designed to upgrade technology resources, the center is named for Ruth Margaret Granger O'Quinn (1925-2021), a 1960 LC alumnus, retired classroom teacher, and a former member of the Rapides Parish School Board. She was the widow of Hansel B. O'Quinn (1916-1967; LC Class of 1954). In 2013, O'Quinn was named an LC "Distinguished Alumnus."
- Cavanaugh Hall of Science, built in 1969, contains offices, classrooms, and laboratory facilities for the departments of biology, chemistry, mathematics, and nursing. The building was named in 1975 to honor Charles J. Cavanaugh, an LC professor of biology from 1945 to 1977.
- Weathersby Fine Arts Building, completed in 1961 and completely renovated in 1993, contains the departments of art and music. The building features an exhibition gallery with an adjacent storeroom and a 151-seat recital hall.
- Guinn Auditorium and Religious Education Center, built in 1973 in an earlier capital improvements program, is home to the religious studies department and contains the 300-seat Frances Bolton Chapel and the 1,800-seat Guinn Auditorium. The auditorium is home to the Gladys Tatum West pipe organ, a 185-rank, five-manual Moeller organ, one of the largest such instruments in the Southern United States. The building is named in honor of past president G. Earl Guinn.
- Martin Performing Arts Center, built in 1992, houses the media communications, journalism, and theatre departments, a 400-seat black-box theatre, a television studio, and KZLC-LP Radio, 95.5 MHz FM.
- H. O. West Physical Education Building, which contains a 4,800-seat gymnasium, a heated swimming pool, and the department of health and physical education, is named for the late retailer H.O. West of Minden, the husband of Gladys Tatum West.
- Norton Library, which contains more than 130,000 volumes, 174,000 government documents, 75,000 items in microfilm, and subscribes to over 500 periodicals. The building was built in 1955.
- Tudor Hall, a men's residence hall that has a capacity of 168 men. The building was constructed in 1957. The hall is currently undergoing renovation to all of the dormitories, which is expected to be completed by late 2020.
- English Village, a men's apartment complex open to upper-level students, houses ninety-two students and is noted for its Lincoln Log-style design.
- Church Hall, a former Methodist church renovated into a men's residence hall, is open to upper-level students and houses the football fieldhouse and the security and information technology offices.
- Cottingham Hall, a women's residence hall, is named in honor of Claybrook Cottingham, a native of Virginia, who was the LC president from 1910 until 1941, when he became the president of Louisiana Tech University in Ruston. Built in 1940, Cottingham Hall houses three hundred women. It is the largest residential building on the campus.
- College Drive Apartments, the newest building on the Louisiana College campus, was completed in 2001. This apartment building is open to upper-level women and can house forty-five.
- Hixson Student Center and Granberry Conference Center, remodeled in 1997, is the hub of student activities. It houses the post office, a commons area, a game room, various student life offices, a short-order restaurant, and the campus bookstore.
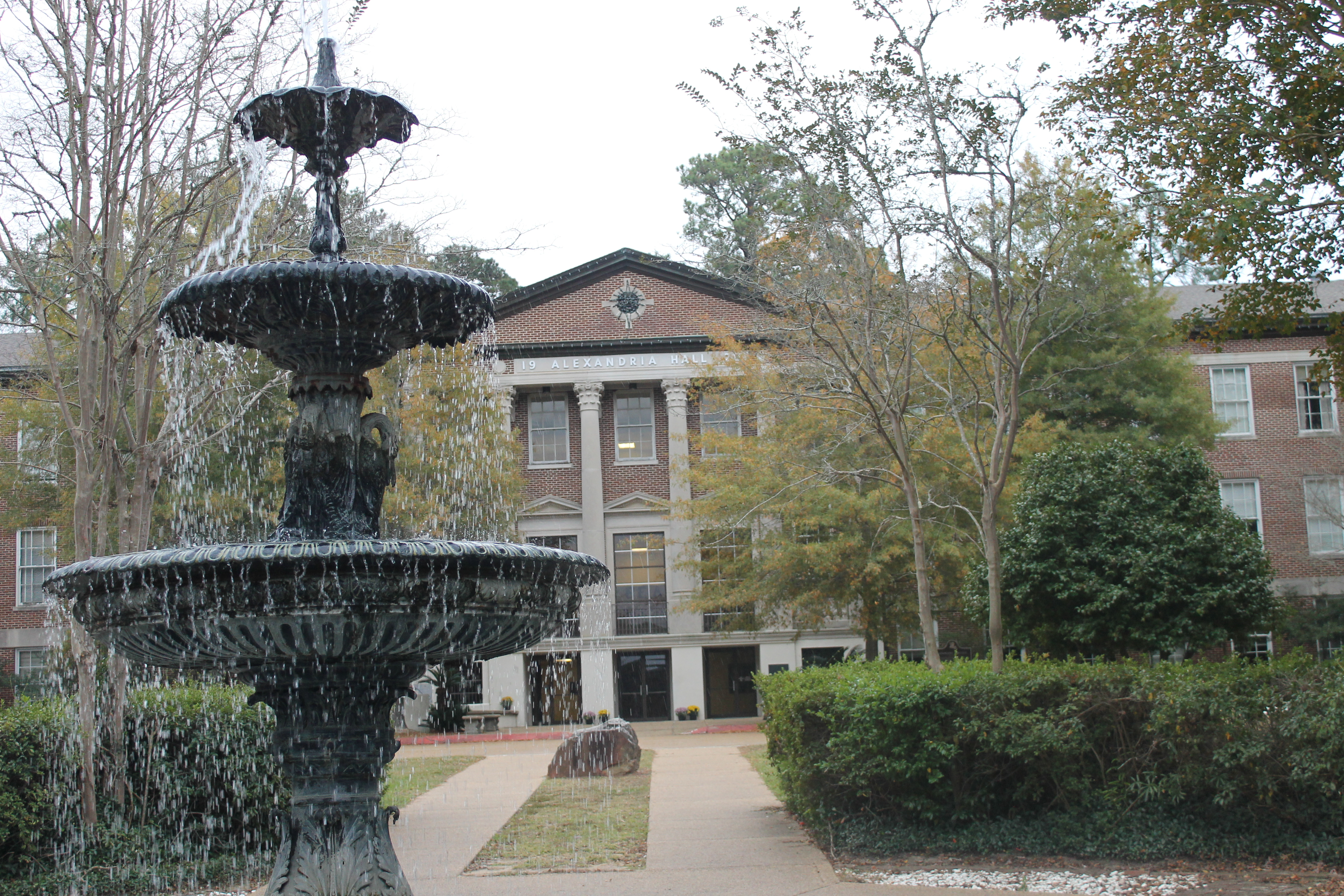
Alexandria Hall houses the administrative offices

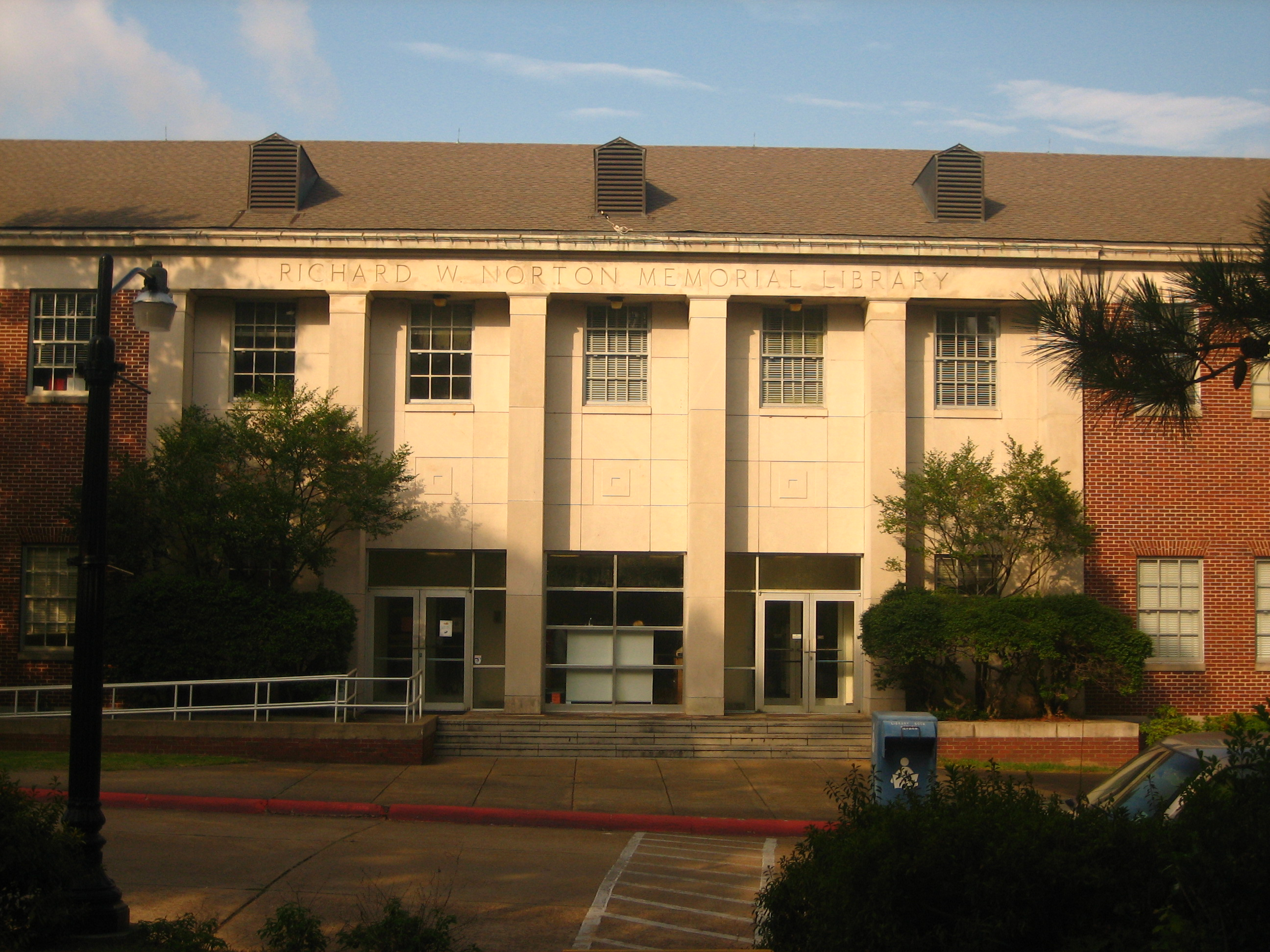
Richard W. Norton Memorial Library

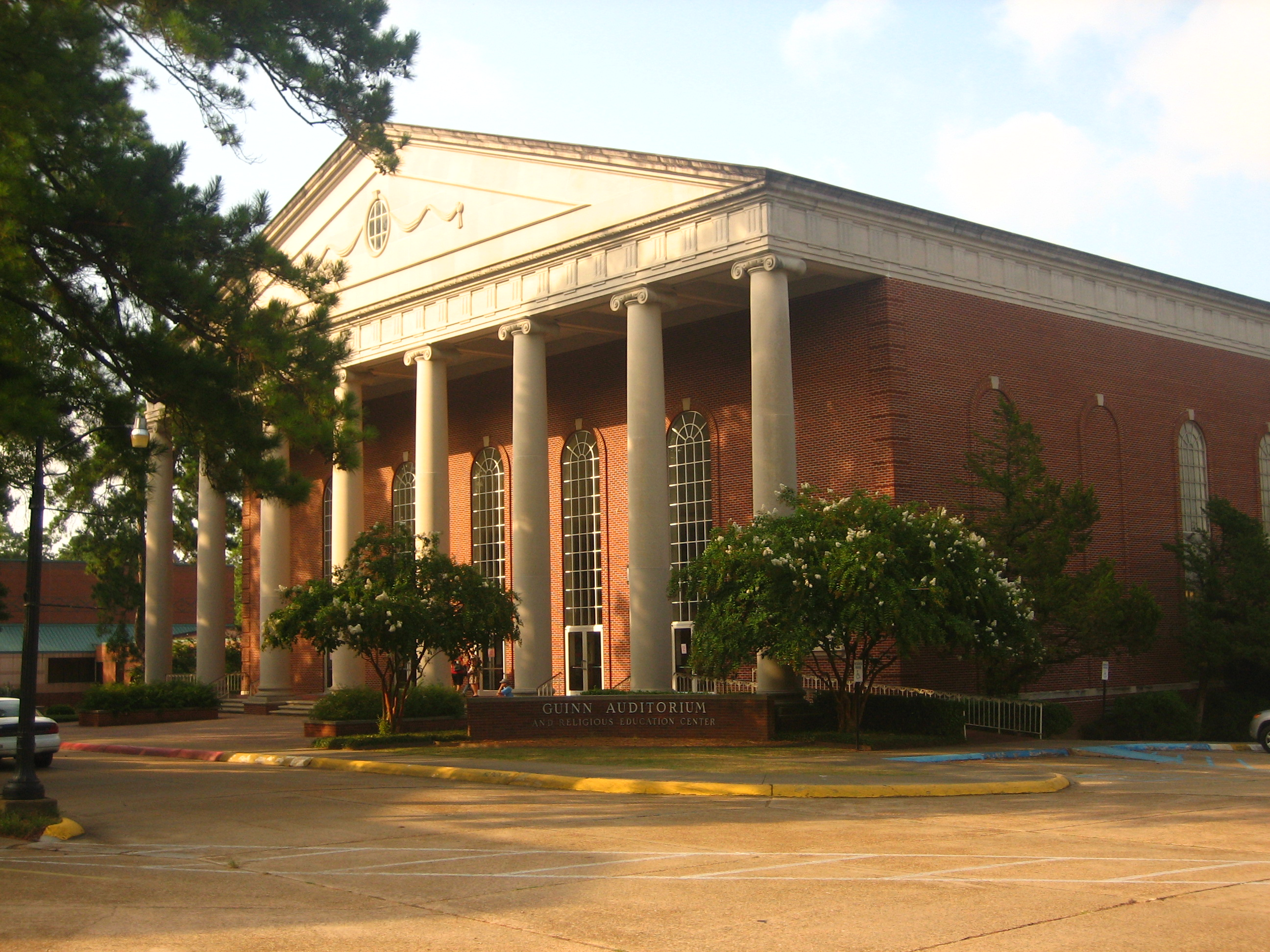
Guinn Auditorium

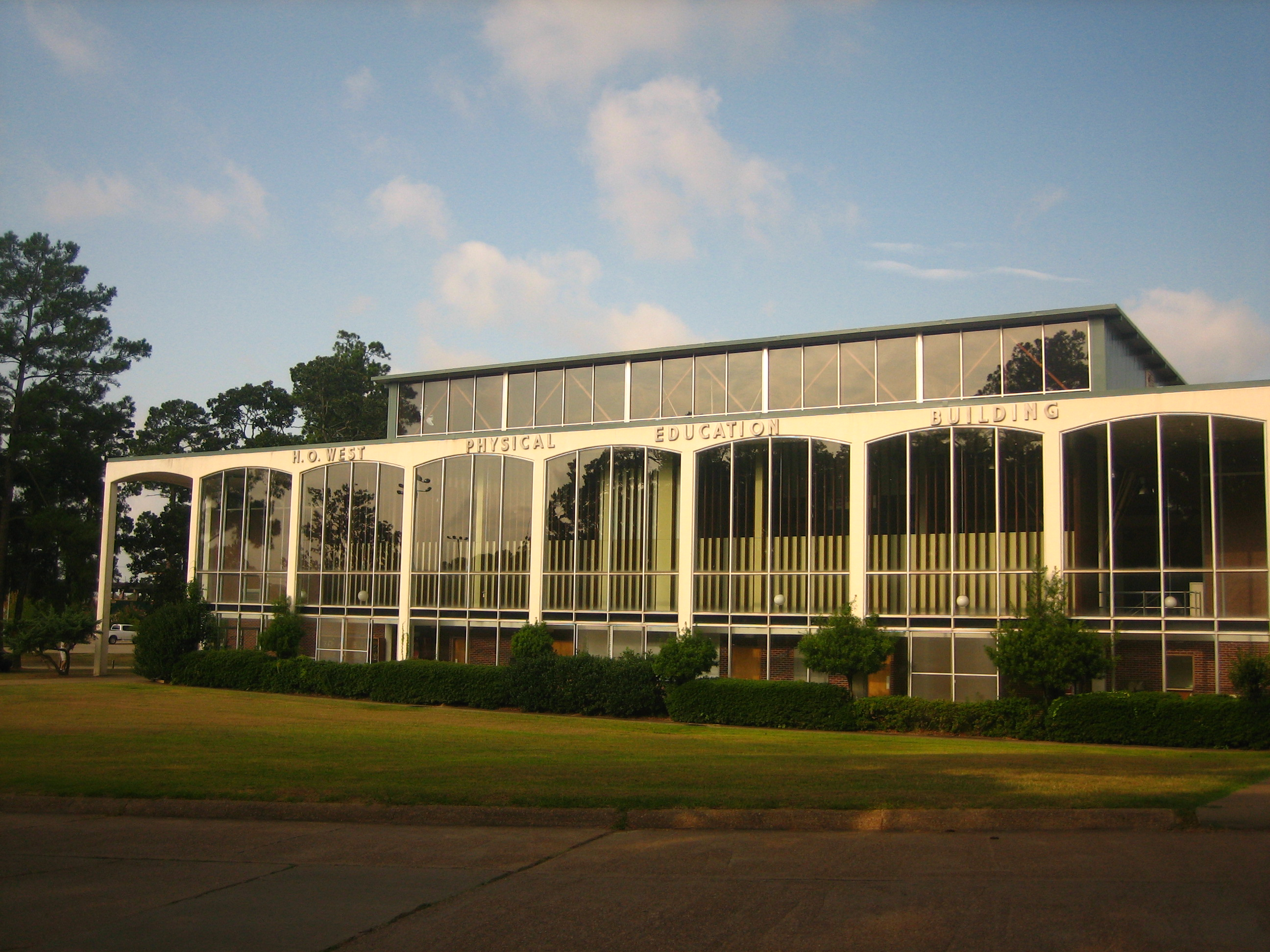
H.O. West Physical Education Building

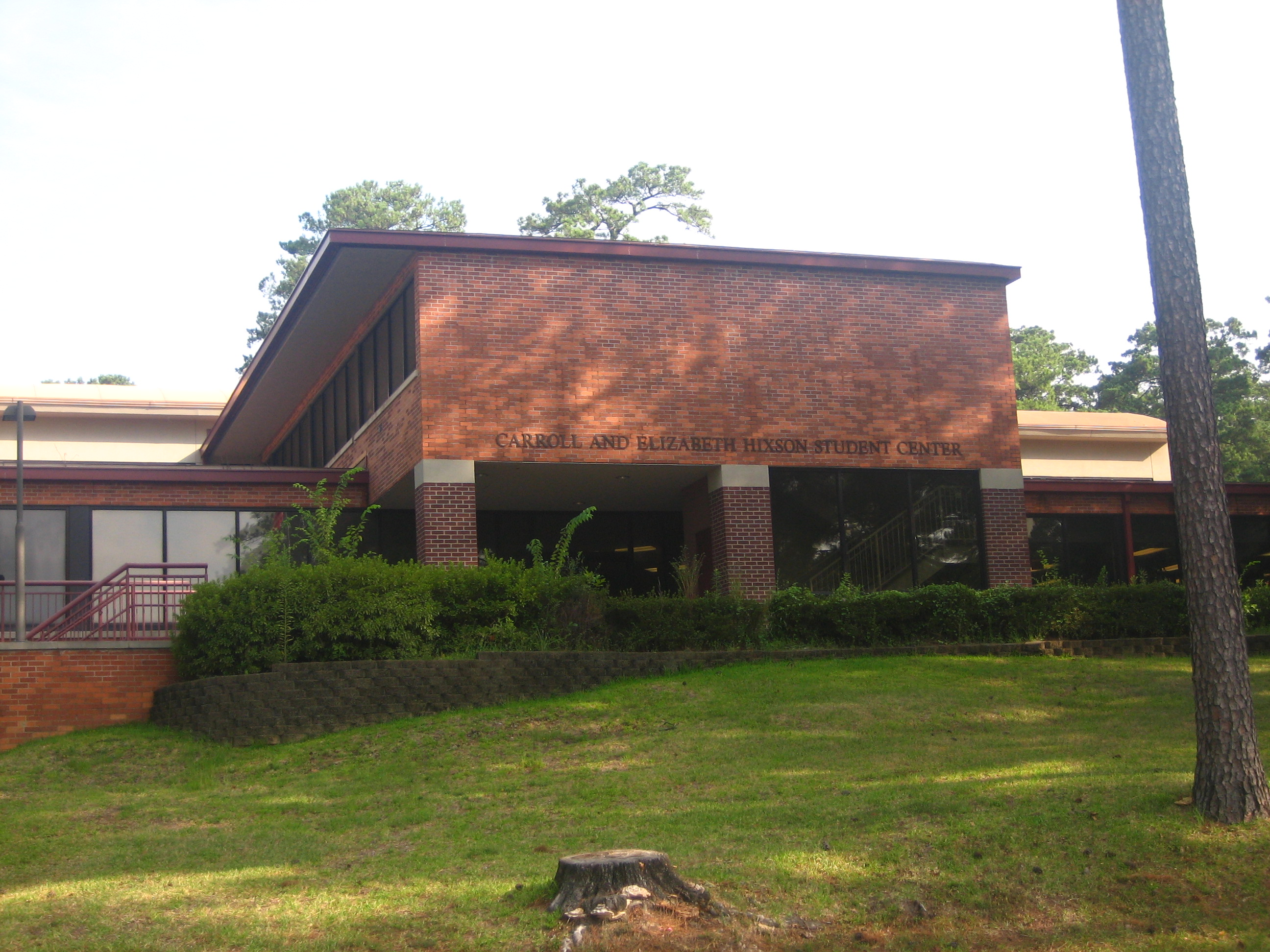
Student Center named for Carroll and Elizabeth Hixson

== Academics ==
Academic rankings

Regional
- U.S. News & World Report: 106 (South)

Louisiana Christian University awards the Bachelor of Arts, Bachelor of Music, Bachelor of Science, Bachelor of Science in Nursing, Bachelor of Social Work, and Bachelor of General Studies degrees. It offers more than seventy majors, minors, and pre-professional programs.

== Views ==
=== LGBTQ+ issues ===
Louisiana College withdrew from the Council of Christian Colleges and Universities (CCCU) in 2019 because CCCU supported civil rights protections for LGBT students. The college states that one should "seek to live in purity before the Lord" by rejecting feelings of same-sex attraction.

LCU maintains a close relationship with Alliance Defending Freedom; during the 2021–2022 school year, LCU held multiple events featuring ADF Regional Director Shannon Kendrick, as well as senior counsel Gregory S. Baylor. The events were held as part of the university's "Christ Church Culture" series, which are mandatory attendance for students receiving various scholarships provided by the school, comprising over half of the student body population.

In September 2022, LCU graduate and founder/executive director of anti-LGBT group Living Hope Ministries, Ricky Chelette, spoke at both C3 and LCU's weekly chapel service, attendance of which is mandatory for students.

=== Creationism and evolution ===
Louisiana Christian University supports the teaching of intelligent design, a pseudo-scientific theory on the origin of life. In Alexandria Hall, the famous Sebastian C. Adams' Synchronological Chart of Universal History (1881) charts the biblical history narrative as it intersects with contemporary history. Notably, this chart covers 6,000 years compatible with young-earth creationist views on biblical history. Wade Warren, who holds the Cavanaugh Chair in Biology, has endorsed the inclusion of language in educational standards that cast doubt on the validity of Darwin's theory of evolution. Moreover, Warren has publicly argued that "the evidence today is suggesting that the Darwinian model is failing and that life itself was intentionally designed." In late 2019, Ken Ham, the founder of Answers in Genesis was scheduled to speak at the annual Values and Ethics Conference. Ultimately, Ham was unable to visit for personal reasons.

== Law school in Shreveport ==
In 2007, Louisiana College announced plans for a law school named for Judge Paul Pressler, a leading figure in the Southern Baptist Convention, which would open in 2009. In 2010, the college announced that the law school would be located in Shreveport, and Mike Johnson would be its inaugural dean. In 2011, the college purchased the former Joe D. Waggoner Federal Building for the law school, but the building required extensive renovation, including asbestos removal. Johnson resigned as dean in 2012, and in 2013, the Waggoner building was sold to the state. The proposed school was unable to meet its fundraising goals or receive accreditation to award law degrees, and never opened.

In May 2022, Guidepost Solutions released an independent report stating that the law school's namesake was the defendant in a civil lawsuit alleging that he repeatedly sexually abused the plaintiff, beginning when the plaintiff was 14. Two other men have submitted affidavits accusing Pressler of sexual misconduct.

== Student life ==
Louisiana Christian University has several treasured traditions carried out by its students. While LCU lacks many student organizations, traditions are handed down mostly through word of mouth. One of the first traditions learned about at LCU is the marriage swing located in front of Cottingham Hall. Legend holds that if a couple sits on the swing simultaneously, they are destined to be married. This leads to apprehension to sit on the swing, although many take their chances. Several have even proposed at the marriage swing. However, the original marriage swing was broken in the spring semester of the 2010–2011 school year and replaced by a replica. Even had this not occurred, the purported mystical effects of the marriage swing would have been rendered null in the spring of 2015 when the student government paid to have every swing on campus replaced. Another tradition once held was the annual rolling of Cottingham Forest during Mom's Weekend. Every year, LCU held a Mom's Weekend event when girls and their moms would share time on campus. On the first night of this weekend, the male students of LCU would collect toilet paper and use it to TP the trees immediately in front of Cottingham Hall. In the morning, the girls would awake to a white wintery wonderland. The practice ceased shortly after current LCU president Rick Brewer took leadership of the school.

== Athletics ==
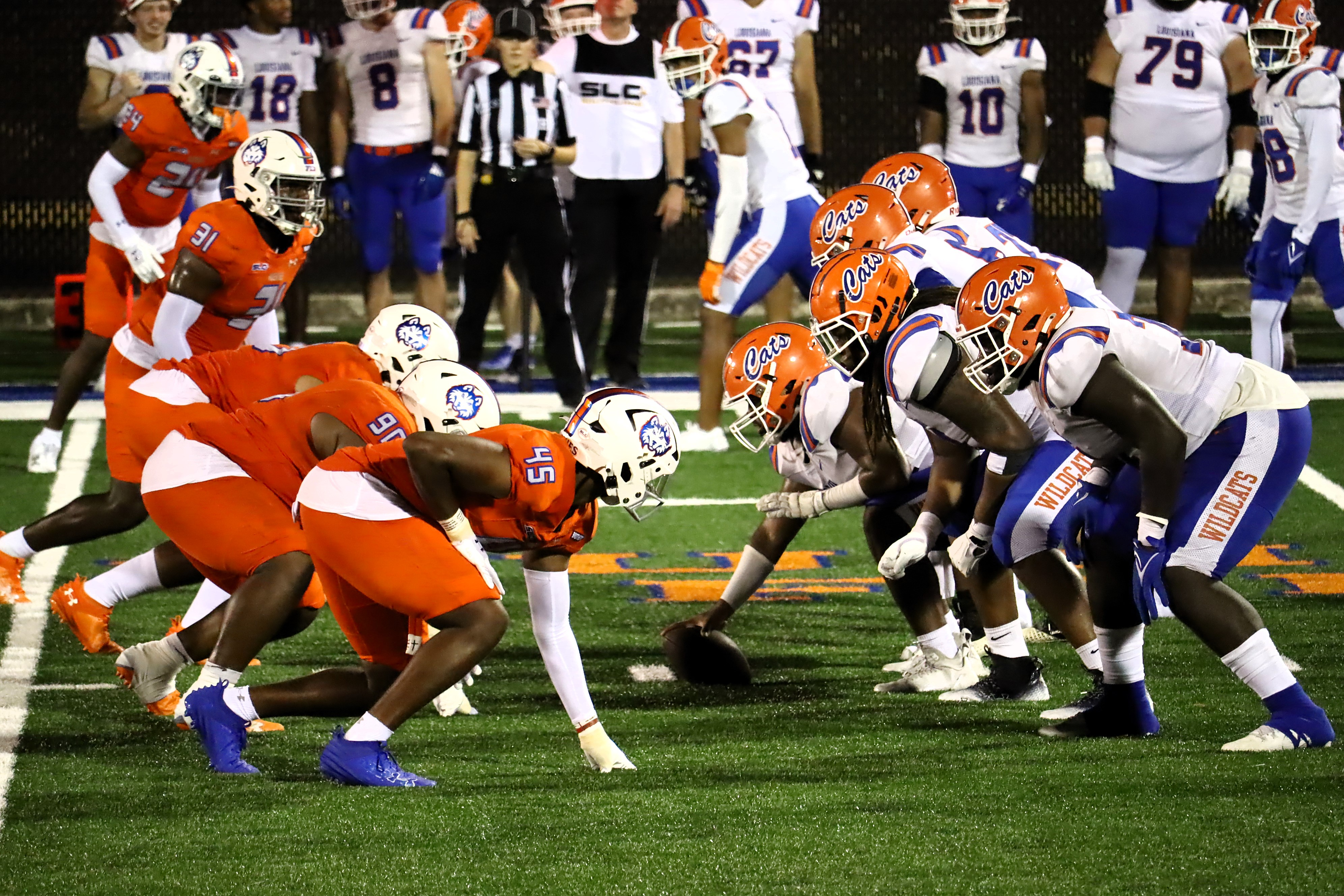
The Wildcats football team (right) lines up on offense during a 2024 game against Houston Christian University.

The Louisiana Christian athletic teams are called the Wildcats and Lady Wildcats. The university is a member of the National Association of Intercollegiate Athletics (NAIA), primarily competing in the Red River Athletic Conference (RRAC) for most of its sports since the 2021–22 academic year; while its football team competes in the Sooner Athletic Conference (SAC). The Wildcats and Lady Wildcats previously competed in the American Southwest Conference (ASC) of the Division III ranks of the National Collegiate Athletic Association (NCAA) from 2000–01 to 2020–21; and in the NAIA's Gulf Coast Athletic Conference (GCAC) from 1981–82 to 1999–2000.

Louisiana Christian competes in nine intercollegiate varsity sports: Men's sports include baseball, basketball, football, golf, and soccer; women's sports include basketball, soccer, softball, and volleyball. Former sports included men's and women's cross country, women's golf, men's and women's tennis, and men's and women's track & field.

== Notable people ==
=== Faculty ===
- W.C. Friley (1845-1911), first president of Hardin-Simmons University (1892-94) and second president of Louisiana College (1909-10)
- Robert L. Lynn (1931-2020), president of Louisiana College from 1975-1997
- Edgar Godbold (1879-1952), former LC biology professor and later president of Howard Payne College (1923-29) and Louisiana College (1942-51). President of the Louisiana Baptist Convention from 1950-51
- Charles J. Cavanaugh, Professor of Biology, taught for 32 years and retired in 1977. Built a strong pre-med program.

=== Alumni ===
==== Politics ====
- Chris Broadwater, District 86 state representative from Tangipahoa Parish (January 2012-December 2017)
- Jackson B. Davis (1918–2016), former state senator; attended LC from 1933 to 1934
- Jimmie Davis (1899–2000), popular singer and 47th Governor of Louisiana (1944–1948 and 1960–1964). The former governor has a tuition-free scholarship in his name for incoming first-year students, along with a historical marker located near Alexandria Hall. Member of the Country Music Hall of Fame
- C. H. "Sammy" Downs (Class of 1932, 1911–1985), member of both houses of the Louisiana state legislature from Rapides Parish and advisor to Governors Earl Kemp Long and John McKeithen
- Rufus D. Hayes (1913–2002), first Louisiana insurance commissioner, 1957–1964
- Edith Killgore Kirkpatrick (1918-2014), member of Louisiana Board of Regents; state Baptist official; wife of Claude Kirkpatrick
- Richard Land (born 1946), member of the Board of Reference for the establishment of Judge Paul Pressler School of Law in Shreveport
- George S. Long (1883–1958), U.S. representative from the defunct Eighth Congressional District
- Lance Harris (born 1961), Republican majority leader of the Louisiana House of Representatives from 2013-20 and representative from the 25th District of the Louisiana House of Representatives from 2012-2024

==== Media ====
- Winston De Ville (born 1937), Louisiana genealogist and publisher.
- Baylus Benjamin McKinney (1886–1952), singer, songwriter, and music editor; composed "The Nail Scarred Hand", "I Am Satisfied with Jesus", and "Wherever He Leads I'll Go".
- Tinka Milinović, Bosnian-American recording artist.

==== Sports ====
- Jeremy Vujnovich (Born 1990), former NFL offensive lineman
- Ben McLaughlin (Born 1986), former LCU quarterback. 2010 Melberger Award winner and Gagliardi Trophy finalist; current LCU head football coach
- Ernie Duplechin (1932-2020), former head football coach and athletic director at McNeese State University
- Ronnie Thompson (Born 1944), longtime high school and collegiate football coach in Texas from 1968-2008.
- Devone Payne (1913-1958), former head football coach and athletic director at Northeast Louisiana University.
- Dennis Duncan (1943-2014), 1965 NFL draft selection and later all-star in the Canadian Football League
- Jesse Hickman (1939-2022), a former professional baseball player with the Kansas City Athletics of the MLB
- John T. Curtis, Jr. (Born 1947), head football coach and headmaster at John Curtis Christian School in River Ridge, Louisiana. Winningest high school football coach of all-time nationally

==== Education ====
- G. Earl Guinn (1912–2004), first LC graduate to be president of the college (1951–1975)
- Garnie W. McGinty (1900–1984), Louisiana historian began his studies at LC but graduated from Northwestern State University in Natchitoches

==== Religion ====
- Wilmer Clemont Fields (1922–2018) (BA), Southern Baptist minister and SBC executive.
