= Joe W. Aguillard =

Former Louisiana College president

Joe Wallace Aguillard

8th President of Louisiana College
- In office January 19, 2005 – May 31, 2014
- Preceded by: Rory Lee
- Succeeded by: Argile Smith (interim until August 1, 2014); His 2013-2014 salary was $202,007.

Personal details
- Born: July 15, 1956 (age 70) Basile, Louisiana, US
- Party: Republican
- Spouse: Judy Collins Aguillard
- Children: 3
- Education: Louisiana College; McNeese State University; Nova Southeastern University

Dr. Joe W. Aguillard

Dr. Joe W. Aguillard is an American educator, administrator, and pastor who served as superintendent of Beauregard Parish schools (1998–2000), division chair of Louisiana College, and president of Louisiana College from 2000 to 2016. He was later named President Emeritus by the Louisiana College Board of Trustees in recognition of his leadership and service.<ref>{{cite web |title=Board of Trustees honors President Aguillard with President Emeritus |publisher=Louisiana College |url=https://lacollege.edu/}}</ref>

Early life and education

Aguillard is a graduate of Louisiana College, where his family has longstanding ties.. His parents met at the college, and he later met his wife there; all of his children also attended the institution.

He earned a bachelor's degree from Louisiana College, two master's degrees from McNeese State University, and a Doctor of Education (Ed.D.) from Nova Southeastern University. He later completed a Doctor of Ministry (D.Min.), producing a 306-page dissertation documenting his family's historical connection to Louisiana College dating back to 1932.

Career in education

Prior to entering higher education, Aguillard served as superintendent of Beauregard Parish schools.

In 2000, he joined Louisiana College as an associate professor of education and Chair of the Division of Education and Coordinator of Teacher Education.

In 2004, he was named Teacher of the Year by the Louisiana College student body.<ref name="BP2005">{{cite news |title=Louisiana College trustees elect Aguillard president |work=Baptist Press |date=January 20, 2005 |url=https://www.baptistpress.com/resource-library/news/louisiana-college-trustees-elect-aguillard-president/}}</ref>

During his tenure in the Education Division, Aguillard developed the college's first graduate program, the Master of Arts in Teaching, and led the unit through national accreditation by the National Council for Accreditation of Teacher Education (NCATE). Program completers increased from 14 to more than 600.

Presidency of Louisiana College (2005–2015)

Appointment

In January 2005, Aguillard was elected president of Louisiana College by a 17–13 vote of the Board of Trustees following a contested selection process.<ref name="BP2005"/>

At the time of his appointment, the college had been placed on probation in 2004 by the Southern Association of Colleges and Schools due to governance and academic concerns.<ref name="BP2005"/>

Growth and expansion

During Aguillard's presidency, Louisiana College experienced significant growth in enrollment, academic programming, and campus infrastructure.

Enrollment increased from 1,005 students in 2005 to 1,893 students in 2010, according to Integrated Postsecondary Education Data System (IPEDS) data.<ref>{{cite web |title=IPEDS Data Center – Louisiana College |publisher=National Center for Education Statistics |url=https://nces.ed.gov/ipeds/}}</ref>

Due to rapid enrollment growth, the college temporarily housed students in local hotels because existing campus housing reached capacity.

Aguillard's administration oversaw major campus expansion projects, including the construction of student apartment housing, athletic facilities, and campus renovations. A multi-million-dollar football stadium was developed during this period.

Financial development during his presidency included a $10 million gift, one of the largest contributions in the institution's history.<ref>{{cite news |title=LC Board exonerates Aguillard |work=The Baptist Message |date=May 8, 2013 |url=https://baptistmessage.com/lc-board-exonerates-aguillard/}}</ref>

Institutional conflict and board review

During Aguillard's presidency, internal disputes regarding governance and theological direction became public through media reports and institutional review processes.

In 2013, the Louisiana College Board of Trustees conducted an investigation into erroneous allegations raised during this period and formally exonerated Aguillard of wrongdoing.<ref>{{cite news |title=LC Board exonerates Aguillard |work=The Baptist Message |date=May 8, 2013 |url=https://baptistmessage.com/lc-board-exonerates-aguillard/}}</ref>

At a 2014 recognition ceremony, trustee Dr. Leon Hyatt stated:

“I want to say probably Dr. Aguillard is the most criticized president the college has ever had. Why? Because, like Jesus, he told it like it is.”<ref>{{cite news |title=Aguillard’s recognition ceremony |work=The Town Talk |author=Leigh Guidry |date=August 28, 2014}}</ref>

During this period, Aguillard reported concerns related to institutional governance and campus safety to external authorities including the Clery Bureau. In 2018, the U.S. Department of Education's Clery Act Compliance Division acknowledged receipt of a formal complaint submitted by Aguillard regarding alleged violations of federal campus safety reporting requirements.<ref>{{cite report |title=Clery Act Compliance Correspondence |publisher=U.S. Department of Education |date=April 24, 2018}}</ref>

Honors and recognition

In 2006, Aguillard and his wife, Judy Collins Aguillard, were named Distinguished Alumni of Louisiana College during the institution's centennial celebration, where the award was presented by former U.S. President George H. W. Bush.

On August 28, 2014, the Louisiana College Board of Trustees held a formal ceremony naming Aguillard President Emeritus in recognition of his leadership and service.<ref>{{cite web |title=Board of Trustees honors President Aguillard with President Emeritus |publisher=Louisiana College |url=https://lacollege.edu/}}</ref>

Later work

Following his presidency, Aguillard continued to serve in higher education and ministry as a professor and pastor, focusing on Christian education, leadership, and the relationship between biblical authority and institutional effectiveness.

References

1. Baptist Press. “Louisiana College trustees elect Aguillard president.” January 20, 2005. https://www.baptistpress.com/resource-library/news/louisiana-college-trustees-elect-aguillard-president/
2. National Center for Education Statistics. “IPEDS Data Center – Louisiana College.” https://nces.ed.gov/ipeds/
3. The Baptist Message. “LC Board exonerates Aguillard.” May 8, 2013. https://baptistmessage.com/lc-board-exonerates-aguillard/
4. Guidry, Leigh. “Aguillard's recognition ceremony.” The Town Talk. August 28, 2014.
5. U.S. Department of Education. Clery Act Compliance Division correspondence. April 24, 2018.
6. Louisiana College. “Board of Trustees honors President Aguillard with President Emeritus.” https://lacollege.edu/
