= Louisiana Baptist Convention =

Association of Baptist churches

- Classification: Western Christian
- Orientation: Protestant
- Theology: Baptist
- Polity: Congregational
- Executive Director: Steve Horn
- Associations: Southern Baptist Convention
- Region: Louisiana
- Origin: 1848; Mount Lebanon, Louisiana
- Congregations: 1,600 (2023)
- Members: 620,000 (2023)
- Other name(s): Louisiana Baptists
- Official website: louisianabaptists.org

The Louisiana Baptist Convention (LBC) or Louisiana Baptists is a Baptist state convention affiliated with the Southern Baptists. Comprising approximately 1,600 affiliated churches and 620,000 members, the Louisiana Baptist Convention's offices are located in the city of Alexandria. The executive director of the Louisiana Baptists is Steve Horn.

== History ==
In 1848, the Louisiana Baptist Convention was organized by 13 Baptists as the Baptist State Convention of North Louisiana; they met at Mount Lebanon. By 1853, the name of the convention was changed to the Baptist State Convention of Louisiana, before changing its name to the present Louisiana Baptist Convention.

In 1906, the convention's membership established the present-day Louisiana Christian University, and Baptist Hospital in Alexandria, Baton Rouge General Hospital, and Baptist Hospital in New Orleans were founded between the 1920s and 1940s.

In 2012, Fred Luter Jr. of the Louisiana Baptists was elected the first African American president of the Southern Baptist Convention. Following his election, an alternate descriptor for Southern Baptists—the Great Commission Baptists—was approved and gained notable use by the 2020s for racial and regional inclusion.

== Beliefs ==
Churches affiliated with the Louisiana Baptists are also affiliated with the Southern Baptist Convention at large; these churches subscribe to variations of the Baptist Faith & Message.

== Partner ministries ==
Louisiana Baptists are primarily supported through the Cooperative Program of the Southern Baptist Convention; in the U.S. state of Louisiana, the Southern Baptists own and operate the New Orleans Baptist Theological Seminary, though the Louisiana Baptist Convention operates Louisiana Christian University (formerly Louisiana College). The Louisiana Baptist Convention also owns and operates a state newspaper, The Baptist Message. The state convention also has partnerships with the SBC's North American Mission Board, International Mission Board, Lifeway, and other prominent Southern Baptist entities.
