= Pineville, Louisiana =

Pineville
- City
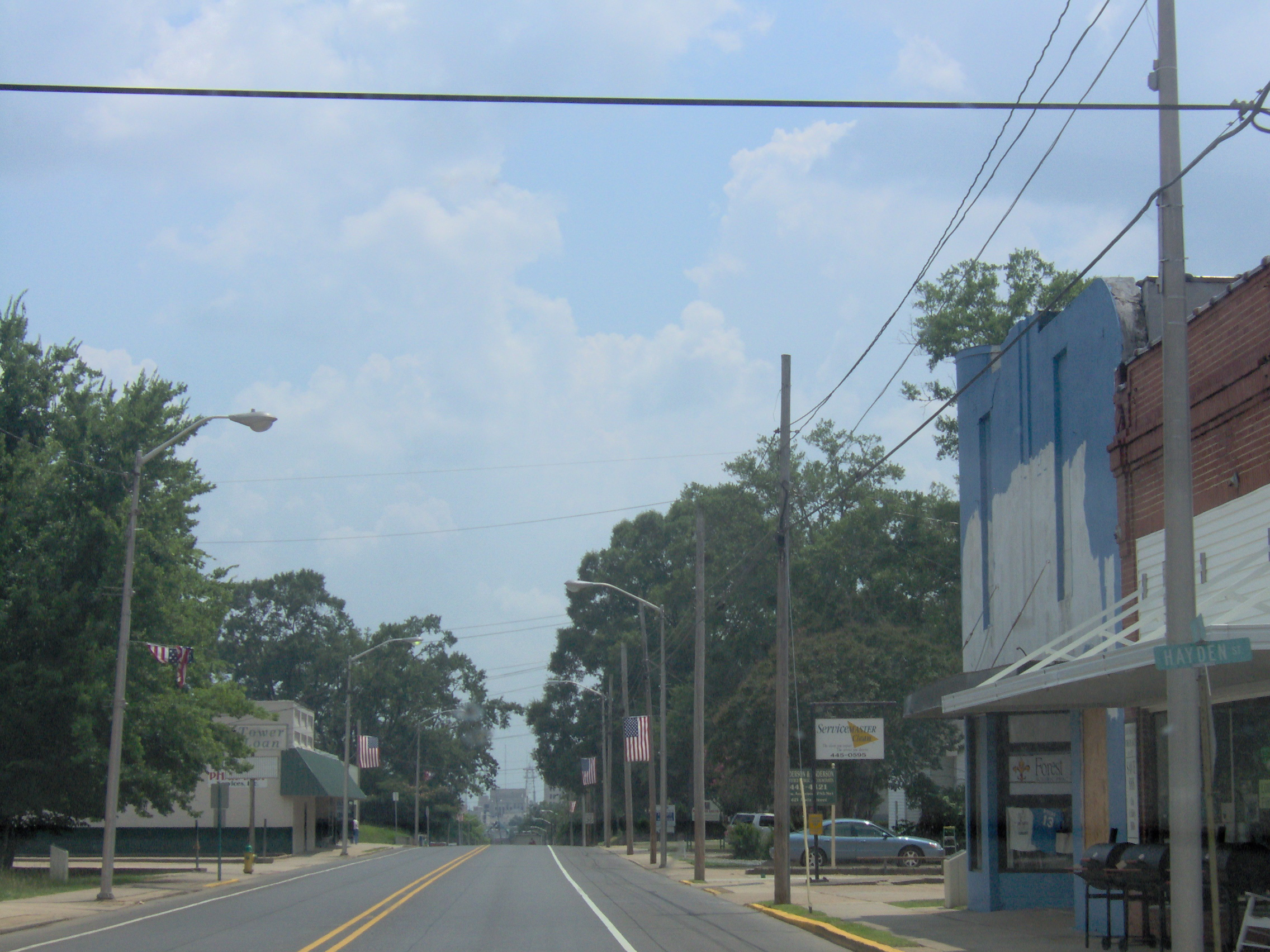

- Location of Pineville in Rapides Parish, Louisiana.

- Location of Louisiana in the United States
- Coordinates: 31°20′20″N 92°24′45″W
- Country: United States
- State: Louisiana
- Parish: Rapides

Government
  - Mayor: Joe Bishop

Area
  - Total: 13.14 sq mi (34.04 km^{2})
  - Land: 12.62 sq mi (32.68 km^{2})
  - Water: 0.53 sq mi (1.36 km^{2})
- Elevation: 118 ft (36 m)

Population (2020)
  - Total: 14,384
  - Rank: RA: 2nd
  - Density: 1,140.0/sq mi (440.15/km^{2})
- Time zone: UTC-6 (CST)
  - Summer (DST): UTC-5 (CDT)
- ZIP code: 71360
- FIPS code: 22-60530
- Website: City of Pineville

Pineville is a city in Rapides Parish, Louisiana, United States. It is located across the Red River from the larger Alexandria, and is part of the Alexandria Metropolitan Statistical Area. In the 2020 census, Pineville had a population of 14,384.

The Central Louisiana State Hospital, the Pinecrest Supports and Services Center, the Huey P. Long Memorial Hospital (closed), the Alexandria Veterans Administration Medical Center, and the Alexandria National Cemetery are all located in Pineville. The city is also home to several large non-government employers including Baker Manufacturing, Procter & Gamble, and Crest Industries.

== History ==
Louisiana State University was founded by the Louisiana General Assembly in 1853. It was founded under the name Louisiana State Seminary of Learning & Military Academy and was located near Pineville. The first academic session began on January 2, 1860, with General William Tecumseh Sherman of Ohio as superintendent.

Pineville was historically a "dry" city, with no alcohol legally available in the community. In a referendum held in the 1980s, voters continued to support a ban on alcohol. Mayor Clarence Fields, who took office in 1999, supported holding another referendum to permit the sale of liquor in restaurants. In a special election in 2013, voters approved liquor sales in restaurants.

== Geography ==
According to the United States Census Bureau, the city has a total area of 12.1 square miles (31.3 km^{2}), of which 11.5 square miles (29.7 km^{2}) is land and 0.6 square mile (1.6 km^{2}) (4.97%) is water.

=== Climate ===
This climatic region is typified by large seasonal temperature differences, with warm to hot and humid summers and mild winters. According to the Köppen Climate Classification system, Pineville has a humid subtropical climate, abbreviated "Cfa" on climate maps.

Climate data for Pineville, Louisiana
Month	Jan	Feb	Mar	Apr	May	Jun	Jul	Aug	Sep	Oct	Nov	Dec	Year
Mean daily maximum °F (°C)	59 (15)	63 (17)	70 (21)	77 (25)	85 (29)	90 (32)	93 (34)	93 (34)	89 (32)	79 (26)	69 (21)	60 (16)	77 (25)
Mean daily minimum °F (°C)	38 (3)	42 (6)	49 (9)	56 (13)	65 (18)	71 (22)	74 (23)	73 (23)	68 (20)	57 (14)	48 (9)	40 (4)	54 (12)
Average precipitation inches (mm)	5.44 (138)	5.53 (140)	5.3 (130)	4.55 (116)	4.72 (120)	5.38 (137)	4.39 (112)	4.11 (104)	3.93 (100)	5.27 (134)	6.19 (157)	6.24 (158)	61.05 (1,546)
Source: Accuweather

== Demographics ==
Historical population
Census	Pop.	Note	%±
1860	393		—
1870	414		5.3%
1880	763		84.3%
1890	540		−29.2%
1900	617		14.3%
1910	1,212		96.4%
1920	2,188		80.5%
1930	3,612		65.1%
1940	4,297		19.0%
1950	6,423		49.5%
1960	8,636		34.5%
1970	8,951		3.6%
1980	12,034		34.4%
1990	12,251		1.8%
2000	13,829		12.9%
2010	14,555		5.2%
2020	14,384		−1.2%
2025 (est.)	13,967	▼	−2.9%
U.S. Decennial Census

=== 2020 census ===
In the 2020 census, Pineville had a population of 14,384. The median age was 36.3 years. 22.9% of residents were under the age of 18 and 15.9% were 65 years of age or older. For every 100 females, there were 95.3 males, and for every 100 females age 18 and over, there were 90.7 males age 18 and over.

There were 5,743 households and 3,063 families in Pineville, of which 30.7% had children under the age of 18 living in them. Of all households, 32.9% were married-couple households, 20.9% were households with a male householder and no spouse or partner present, and 39.8% were households with a female householder and no spouse or partner present. About 35.3% of all households were made up of individuals, and 13.6% had someone living alone who was 65 years of age or older.

There were 6,322 housing units, of which 9.2% were vacant. The homeowner vacancy rate was 1.6% and the rental vacancy rate was 6.5%. 96.4% of residents lived in urban areas, while 3.6% lived in rural areas.

Pineville racial composition
Race	Number	Percentage
White (non-Hispanic)	8,013	55.71%
Black or African American (non-Hispanic)	4,753	33.04%
Native American	68	0.47%
Asian	253	1.76%
Pacific Islander	8	0.06%
Other/Mixed	798	5.55%
Hispanic or Latino	491	3.41%

=== 2000 census ===
In the 2000 census, there were 13,829 people, 4,994 households, and 3,121 families residing in the city. The population density was 1,204.8 inhabitants per square mile (465.2/km^{2}). There were 5,448 housing units at an average density of 474.6 per square mile (183.2/km^{2}). The racial makeup of the city was 69.57% White, 26.08% African American, 0.51% Native American, 1.90% Asian, 0.09% Pacific Islander, 0.30% from other races, and 1.55% from two or more races. Hispanic or Latino of any race were 1.14% of the population.

There were 4,994 households, out of which 30.8% had children under the age of eighteen living with them, 44.4% were married couples living together, 14.6% had a female householder with no husband present, and 37.5% were non-families. 32.5% of all households were made up of individuals, and 12.2% had someone living alone who was 65 years of age or older. The average household size was 2.35 and the average family size was 3.00.

22.5% of the population were aged under the age of 18, 13.1% from 18 to 24, 29.1% from 25 to 44, 22.2% from 45 to 64, and 13.1% who were 65 years of age or older. The median age was 35 years. For every 100 females, there were 97.8 males. For every 100 females age 18 and over, there were 97.3 males.

The median income for a household in the city was $29,159, and the median income for a family was $37,735. Males had a median income of $30,205 versus $21,154 for females. The per capita income for the city was $15,969. About 14.3% of families and 20.8% of the population were below the poverty line, including 20.5% of those under age 18 and 19.9% of those age 65 or over.

== Arts and culture ==
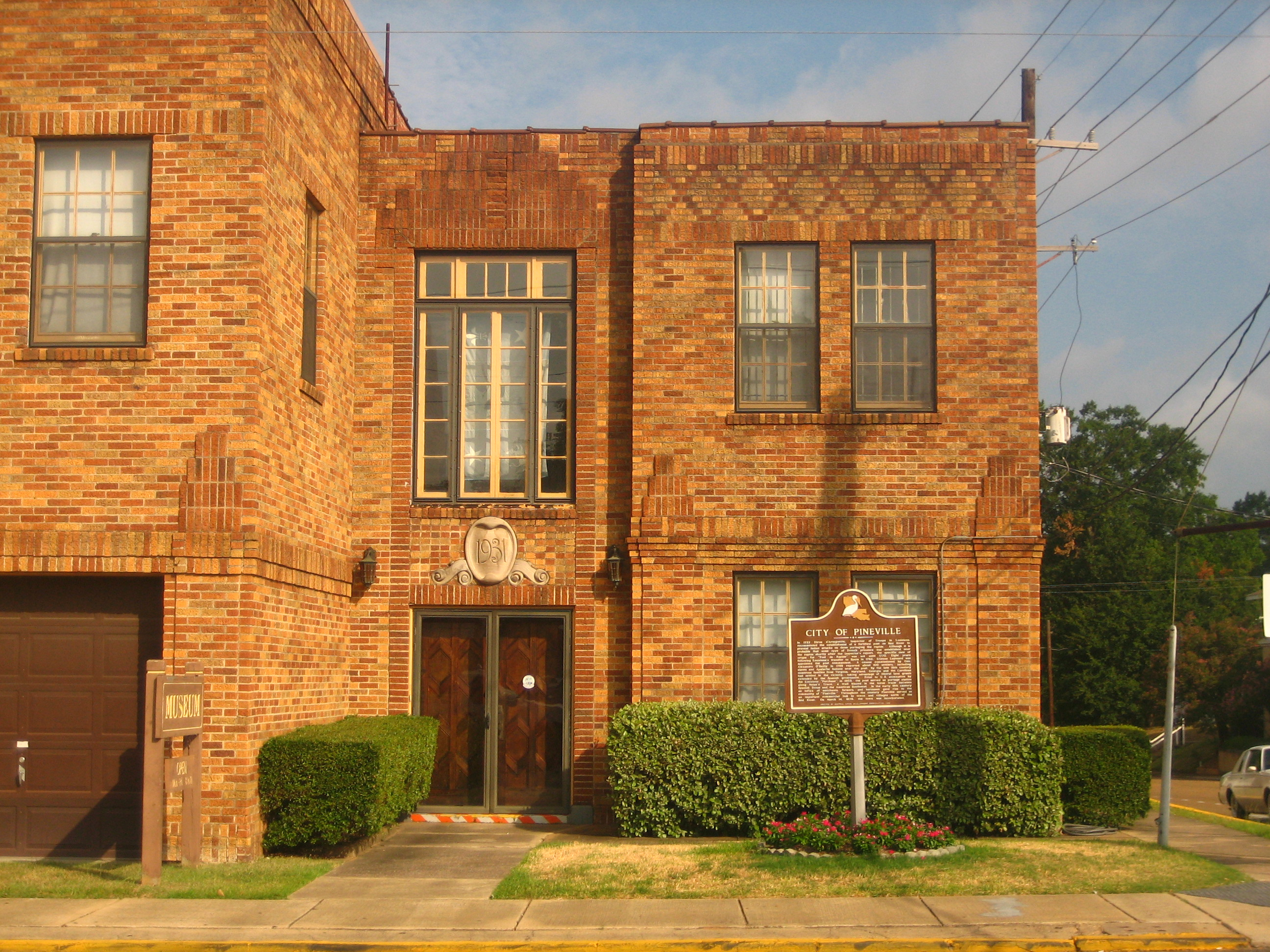
The former Pineville City Hall building now houses the only museum in Louisiana dedicated to municipal government

Louisiana Maneuvers Museum is located at Louisiana National Guard Training Center Pineville.

Old Town Hall Museum "is the only museum in the entire state of Louisiana dedicated to municipal government".

== Education ==
In 1906, the Southern Baptist–affiliated Louisiana College—now known as Louisiana Christian University—opened in Pineville.

The Rapides Parish School Board operates public schools. Pineville High School is in Pineville.

Rapides Parish is in the service area of Central Louisiana Technical Community College.

== Infrastructure ==
The J. Levy Dabadie Correctional Center was located at Camp Beauregard. It closed in July 2012.

From 1939 to 2014, the Huey P. Long Medical Center, a state charity hospital named former governor Huey Long, operated Pineville.

The Curtis-Coleman Memorial Bridge, the replacement for the former O. K. Allen Bridge, named for former Governor Oscar K. Allen, links Alexandria and Pineville across the Red River. The bridge is named for Israel "Bo" Curtis, educator in Rapides Parish and State Representative, and Lemon "Billy" Coleman,Jr. who was an educator in Rapides Parish and a Pineville City Council Member.

Louisiana National Guard Training Center Pineville, formerly Camp Beauregard, in Pineville is operated by the Louisiana Army National Guard. It is the headquarters of the 225th Engineer Brigade and is one of the largest engineer units in the US Army.

The Pineville Expressway is a freeway that carries U.S. Route 167 from downtown Alexandria into Pineville for about ten miles before ending at an interchange with U.S. Route 71 in Creola.

== Media ==
=== Radio ===
Pineville is the second-most populous city of the Alexandria media market for radio.

=== Television ===
Pineville is part of the Alexandria media market for television.

== Notable people ==
- Joe W. Aguillard, president of Louisiana Christian University from 2005 to 2014
- Mark Johnson, president of Louisiana Christian University
- Cody Ford, NFL player for the Cincinnati Bengals
- W. C. Friley, president of Louisiana Christian University from 1909 to 1910
- Faith Ford, actress
- Lawrence T. Fuglaar, state representative for Rapides Parish from 1948 to 1952
- Justin Gaston, actor, model, and singer who was also a contestant on Nashville Star.
- G. Earl Guinn, president of Louisiana College from 1951 to 1975
- Jeff Hall, state representative for District 26 in Rapides Parish
- Henry E. Hardtner, lumber magnate, state legislator, and forestry conservationist
- Ben F. Holt, state representative from Rapides Parish from 1956 to 1960
- Jay F. Honeycutt, director of NASA's Kennedy Space Center from 1995-1997.
- Anjanette Kirkland, track and field athlete
- Rory Lee, president of Louisiana College from 1997 to 2004
- Rashard Lewis, professional basketball player with the Miami Heat
- Jay Luneau, Louisiana State Senator
- Robert L. Lynn, Louisiana College president from 1975 to 1997; now a poet in Duluth, Georgia
- Kenny Mixon, played football at Pineville High, LSU and with NFL.
- Vernon W. Pickett, United States Army first lieutenant and namesake of Fort Pickett
- T. B. Porter, bulldogger and calf roper
- Hugh Thompson Jr., United States Army major who played a role in ending the My Lai massacre in the Vietnam War
- Tommy Tenney, evangelist and author
