= Louisiana Tech University College of Education =

- Established: 1894
- Parent institution: Louisiana Tech University
- Affiliations: SACS-COC; NCATE/CAEP; APA; CACREP; NSCA
- Dean: Donald Schillinger
- Faculty: 41
- Administrative staff: 11
- Students: 2,871
- Undergraduates: 1,023
- Postgraduates: 506
- Location: Ruston, Louisiana, U.S. 32.527198°N 92.649885°W
- Campus: Rural
- Website: education.latech.edu

The College of Education at Louisiana Tech University is one of the five colleges comprising Louisiana Tech University. The mission of the College traces back to the origins of Louisiana Tech in 1894, where the preparation of teachers was a mission of the institution. Today, the College of Education consists of three separate departments awarding thirty-five different academic degrees ranging from the baccalaureate to the doctoral levels.

== History ==
Since its founding in 1894, Louisiana Tech has prioritized the education of teachers. The Laboratory School, A.E. Phillips School, was established by the Legislature in 1916. On November 12, 1925, the State Board of Education approved teacher education curricula, and on March 15, 1926, it recognized the reorganization of these curricula. A Department of Education was formally recognized in 1933, and in April 1934, authorization was granted to organize a separate school. In July 1970, the school was elevated to the status of a College of Education.

In 1948, physical education was transferred from the School of Arts and Sciences to the School of Education as a department. In 1955, the education offerings were divided, creating the Departments of Elementary and Secondary Education and the Department of Special Education. In 1965, the organization expanded to include a Department of Psychology and Guidance, and in 1970, the Division of Research and Publications was established. In July, 1972, the State Board approved a reorganization of the College which created a Division of Research and Service and a Division of Curriculum and Instruction. In the Division of Curriculum and Instruction, three areas of instruction were created; teacher education which included all elementary and secondary programs, psychology and counseling, and health and physical education which included programs for men and women.

In July, 1975, the instructional program in special education was moved from Teacher Education to the area of Counseling and Psychology and the name of the area was changed to Behavioral Sciences.

In January 1994 a new organization plan was approved and the Department of Curriculum, Instruction, and Leadership replaced the former Teacher Education area.

By actions of the State Board of Education on December 17, 1957, January 31, 1958, April 3, 1958, April 18, 1961, July 29, 1968, and February 19, 1974, authorization was given to grant the Master of Arts degree in Art Education, Elementary Education, English Education, Industrial/Organizational Psychology, Music Education, Social Studies Education, Special Education, and Vocational Guidance, and the Master of Science degree in Biology Education, Business Education, Chemistry Education, Mathematics Education, Physics Education, and Health and Physical Education. In April, 1967, the State Board of Education granted approval to offer the Specialist Degree, and on November 1, 1968, authority was granted to offer extension or off-campus courses. In 1994, authority was granted to offer the Ph.D. in Counseling Psychology and the Ed.D. in Curriculum and Instruction and Educational Leadership.

== Academic departments ==
The Louisiana Tech University College of Education is organized into three main academic departments.

- The Department of Curriculum, Instruction, and Leadership
- The Department of Kinesiology
- The Department of Psychology and Behavioral Sciences

== Centers ==
=== A.E. Phillips Laboratory School ===
A.E. Phillips Laboratory School was created by an act of the Louisiana State Legislature in 1916. Since that time, it has served as the laboratory school for Louisiana Tech University.

=== Applied Research for Organizational Solutions ===
AROS Consulting, often referred to as "AROS", is the consulting arm of the Department of Psychology's Industrial and Organizational Psychology doctoral program. Founded in 2010 the AROS program is intended to provide students with experience in applied industrial and organizational psychology outside of the traditional classroom environment.

=== Clinical Residency and Recruitment Center ===
The Clinical Residency and Recruitment Center, often called the CRRC, is a center in the Department of Curriculum, Instruction, and Leadership at Louisiana Tech University. The center was initially funded in 2015, as part of a Louisiana Department of Education grant (from the U.S. Department of Education), to design a center to support full-year teacher residencies, school district partnerships, and the recruitment of education majors to the teaching profession.

=== Professional Development and Research Institute on Blindness ===
The Professional Development and Research Institute on Blindness, sometimes only called "PDRIB", is a research center of the College of Education at Louisiana Tech University. The program was founded in 1996, as part of a grant from the U.S. Department of Education, to create a non-discriminatory program to provide training to individuals interested in teaching braille and cane travel to blind students.

=== Psychological Services Clinic ===
The Louisiana Tech Psychological Services Clinic is operated by the Department of Psychology, and serves as a clinical training center for students in the Counseling Psychology Ph.D. program.

=== Science and Technology Education Center ===
The Science and Technology Education Center, more commonly abbreviated as "SciTEC", is a research and professional development center in the Louisiana Tech University College of Education that promotes the advancement of STEM education. The center is primarily concerned with: advancing STEM education in Louisiana schools, providing professional development opportunities for teachers in STEM areas, addressing the number of uncertified teachers in Louisiana schools, and helping improve the rates at which economically disadvantaged and minority students enter postsecondary education programs.

==== The IDEA Place ====
The IDEA Place is a hands-on math and science learning center located on the campus of Louisiana Tech University in Woodard Hall. Built on the philosophy that real objects, direct experiences, and enjoyment promote learning, The IDEA Place was approved by the Louisiana Board of Regents in 1991. The IDEA Place opened to the public on April 23, 1994.

==== NASA Educator Resource Center ====
In 1999, Louisiana Tech University was selected by the National Aeronautics and Space Administration as the host institution for Louisiana's NASA Educator Resource Center. Educator Resource Centers are established by NASA to disseminate and assist educators in utilizing NASA-developed educational resources. It is the only NASA Educator Resource Center in Louisiana

=== Sport and Movement Science Laboratory ===
The Sport and Movement Science Laboratory is an interdisciplinary instructional and research center of the Department of Kinesiology that is primarily concerned with research combining motor control, exercise physiology, and biomechanics.

In addition to research supporting the academic goals of Louisiana Tech, the laboratory is also engaged in research of strength and conditioning in support of Louisiana Tech athletics.

== Notable alumni ==
- Leon Barmore, former head coach of the Lady Techsters
- Randy Moffett, former President of the University of Louisiana System
- Scotty Robertson, form NBA coach of the Chicago Bulls, Detroit Pistons, and New Orleans Jazz
- Wayne Watson, Dove Award-winning Christian recording artist

== Rankings ==
- #143 Best Graduate Education Schools, 2015 U.S. News & World Report
- #209 Best Graduate Psychology Programs, 2015 U.S. News & World Report
