= Randy Moffett =

Louisiana higher education figure

President of the University of Louisiana System
- In office July 25, 2008 – December 31, 2012
- Preceded by: Sally Clausen
- Succeeded by: Sandra Woodley

President of Southeastern Louisiana University
- In office July 2001 – June 2008
- Succeeded by: John L. Crain

Personal details
- Born: Michael Randolph Moffett; January 10, 1947 (age 78); Jonesboro, Louisiana, U.S.
- Spouse: Barbara Spruill
- Children: 3
- Education: Louisiana Tech University; Northwestern State University; Louisiana State University (EdD)

Randolph Moffett, known as Randy Moffett (born January 10, 1947), is a former president of the University of Louisiana System. He was appointed to the position on July 25, 2008 and retired at the end of 2012.

== Biography ==
A native of Jonesboro in Jackson Parish, Moffett holds a bachelor's degree from Louisiana Tech University in Ruston, a master's degree from Northwestern State University in Natchitoches, and an Ed.D. in educational administration from Louisiana State University in Baton Rouge.

Prior to serving as president of Southeastern, Moffett was the institutional provost and vice president for academic affairs.

=== President of Southeastern Louisiana University ===
From 2001 July to June 2008, Moffett was the president of Southeastern Louisiana University at Hammond, Louisiana. After leaving his position as president of Southeastern, he was honored by a Resolution of Commendation from the University's Faculty Senate.

=== President of the University of Louisiana System ===
He served as president of the University of Louisiana System from 2008 to 2012. During that period, he dealt with funding challenges for the eight ULS campuses. In 2012, two of the universities in the ULS system, Southeastern Louisiana University and Louisiana State University was censured by the American Association of University Professors for violations of AAUP standards on faculty rights. In response, he claimed that “placing universities on a censure list has little, if any, practical implication," a list on which they remain as of 2025.

== Personal life ==
He is married to the former Barbara Spruill, RN, Ph.D. The couple has a son and two daughters.
