= William Wainwright =

William Wainwright may refer to:

- William John Wainwright (1855–1931), British artist from Birmingham
- William Wainwright (land developer) (1836–?), developer of Rockaway Beach, Queens in New York
- Bill Wainwright (1908-2000), British communist activist
- William L. Wainwright (born 1947), American member of the North Carolina General Assembly
- William S. Wainwright, American president of Southeastern Louisiana University
- William Mark Wainwright or William Orbit (1956–2026), English musician and record producer
