= John L. Crain =

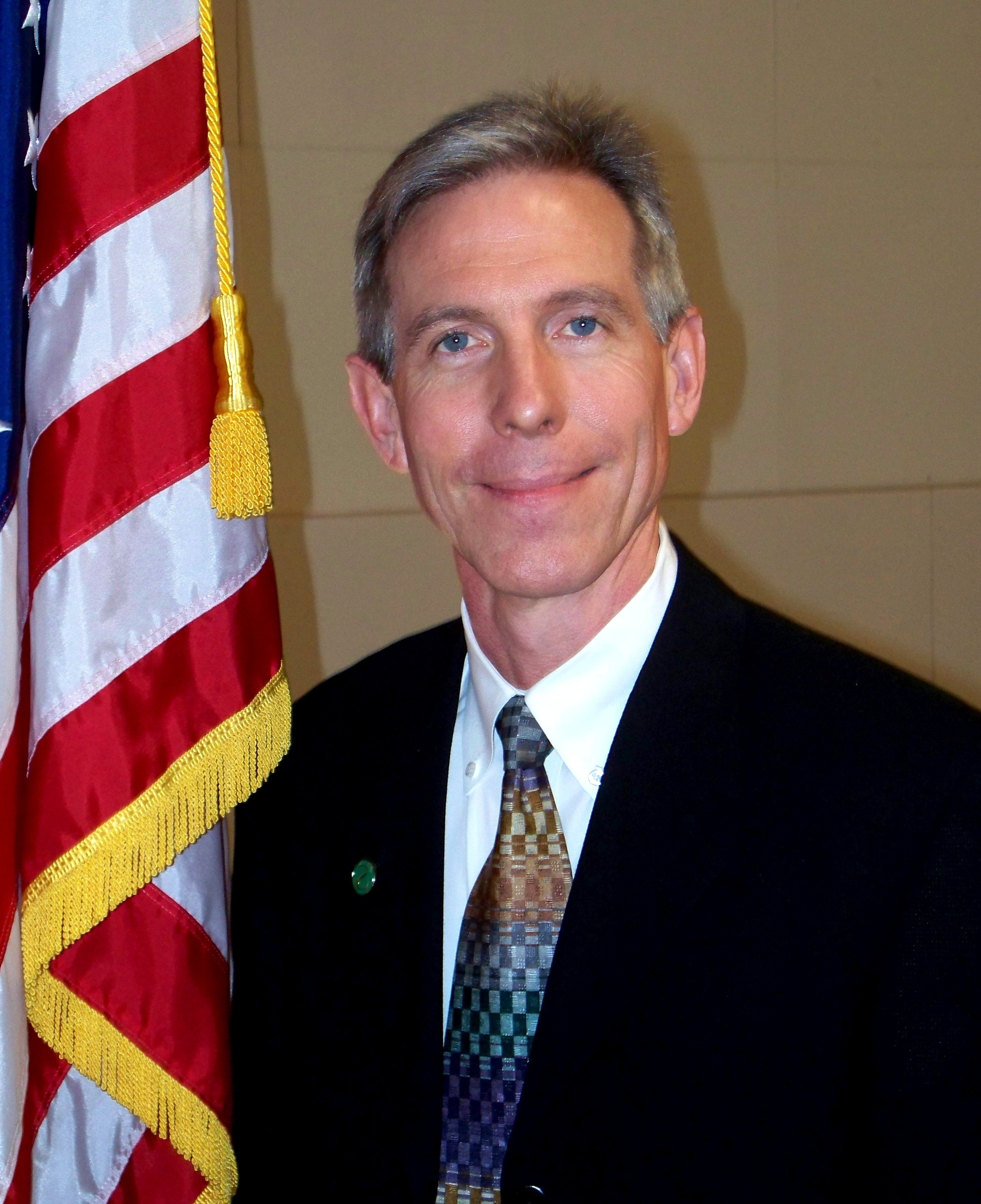

14th President of Southeastern Louisiana University
- In office February 17, 2009 – May 15, 2023
- Preceded by: Randy Moffett
- Succeeded by: William S. Wainwright

Personal details
- Born: 1960 (age 65–66) Franklinton, Louisiana, U.S.
- Education: Southeastern Louisiana University (BS, MBA); University of Mississippi (PhD)
- Awards: Southeastern Louisiana University President's Award for Excellence in Research 1994

John Luther Crain (born 1960, in Franklinton, Louisiana) is an American accountant and academic administrator and formerly served as president of Southeastern Louisiana University, having been appointed to the position on February 17, 2009, by the Board of Supervisors of the University of Louisiana System. He succeeded Randy Moffett. Crain so far has served the longest presidency at Southeastern Louisiana University and in the UL system.

== Education ==
Crain graduated from Franklinton High School in 1978, and later earned B.S. and MBA degrees from Southeastern Louisiana University. He then received a Ph.D. in accountancy from the University of Mississippi. He is an inactive CPA.

== Career ==
Crain previously served as interim president, provost, vice president for academic affairs, accounting department head, president of the Faculty Senate, and tenured professor of accounting. He began full-time employment as an assistant professor of accounting at Southeastern in 1987 and held his first administrative position as interim director of the university's Small Business Development Center. In 1992, Crain received the Southeastern President's Award for Excellence in Research. Crane has authored 63 articles in academic journals.
