= Weaver, Alabama =

City in Alabama, United States

Weaver
- City
- Flag Seal

- Location of Weaver in Calhoun County, Alabama.
- Coordinates: 33°45′18″N 85°48′44″W
- Country: United States
- State: Alabama
- County: Calhoun

Area
  - Total: 3.48 sq mi (9.02 km^{2})
  - Land: 3.48 sq mi (9.01 km^{2})
  - Water: 0.0039 sq mi (0.01 km^{2})
- Elevation: 781 ft (238 m)

Population (2020)
  - Total: 3,339
  - Density: 960/sq mi (370.6/km^{2})
- Time zone: UTC-6 (Central (CST))
  - Summer (DST): UTC-5 (CDT)
- ZIP code: 36277
- Area code: 256
- FIPS code: 01-80352
- GNIS feature ID: 2405699
- Website: weaveral.gov

Weaver is a city in Calhoun County, Alabama, United States. At the 2020 census, the population was 3,339. It is included in the Anniston-Oxford, Alabama Metropolitan Statistical Area.

== Geography ==
Weaver is bordered by the city of Anniston to the south.

According to the U.S. Census Bureau, Weaver has a total area of 3.5 square miles (9.0 km^{2}), of which 0.004 square miles (0.01 km^{2}), or 0.12%, is water.

== Demographics ==
Historical population
Census	Pop.	Note	%±
1950	74		—
1960	140		89.2%
1970	209		49.3%
1980	276		32.1%
1990	271		−1.8%
2000	261		−3.7%
2010	3,038		1,064.0%
2020	3,339		9.9%
U.S. Decennial Census; 2013 Estimate

=== 2020 census ===
As of the 2020 census, Weaver had a population of 3,339. The median age was 35.5 years. 24.6% of residents were under the age of 18 and 15.8% of residents were 65 years of age or older. For every 100 females there were 89.7 males, and for every 100 females age 18 and over there were 85.9 males age 18 and over.

95.1% of residents lived in urban areas, while 4.9% lived in rural areas.

There were 1,273 households in Weaver, of which 38.8% had children under the age of 18 living in them. Of all households, 46.2% were married-couple households, 15.6% were households with a male householder and no spouse or partner present, and 30.3% were households with a female householder and no spouse or partner present. About 23.6% of all households were made up of individuals and 10.5% had someone living alone who was 65 years of age or older. There were 800 families.

There were 1,375 housing units, of which 7.4% were vacant. The homeowner vacancy rate was 2.0% and the rental vacancy rate was 4.6%.

Racial composition as of the 2020 census
Race	Number	Percent
White	2,546	76.3%
Black or African American	462	13.8%
American Indian and Alaska Native	27	0.8%
Asian	37	1.1%
Native Hawaiian and Other Pacific Islander	13	0.4%
Some other race	45	1.3%
Two or more races	209	6.3%
Hispanic or Latino (of any race)	149	4.5%

=== Demographic estimates ===
In 2019, the population density was 77 people per square mile (30 people/km^{2}).

=== Income and poverty ===
The median income for a household in the city was $40,791, and the median income for a family was $48,478. Males had a median income of $34,125 versus $25,573 for females. The per capita income for the city was $20,078. About 10.9% of families and 11.5% of the population were below the poverty line, including 12.2% of those under age 18 and 5.1% of those age 65 or over.

== Government ==
Past (2017) the mayor of the City of Weaver was Wayne Willis.

Currently (2021) the mayor of the City of Weaver is Jeff Clendenning.

== Education ==
Weaver is home to two public schools:

- Weaver High School (Grades 7–12)
- Weaver Elementary School (Grades K-6)

The public schools in Weaver are run by Calhoun County Schools. Weaver High School's sports teams, the Bearcats, compete in Class 3A of the Alabama High School Athletic Association (AHSAA).

Weaver High School has served as a cornerstone and community center for Weaver, Alabama since 1968. The school holds various AHSAA records but none as dominating as the 221 consecutive boys wrestling dual-meet wins. Weaver wrestler Michael Sutton was the first high school wrestler to win 6 consecutive individual state championships (1999-2004). A 27th individual state title was won by Christian Cortez, making him the fourth ASHAA state champion under Andy Fulmer. Others to receive state titles within the Fulmer era are Jake Taylor, Daren Allison and DeAnthony Smith. As of 2024, Weaver has won 12 Traditional Wresting State championships and one State Duels Championship Class 1A-4A including 4x back to back in 1996-1999 and 2001-2004 and currently a 3x back to back 2021–Present.

== Notable people ==
- Mike Rogers, U.S. representative
- Sandra Woodley, president of the University of Louisiana System
