= Kathy Johnson (academic administrator) =

American professor of psychology

8th President of the University of New Orleans
- Incumbent
- Assumed office November 1, 2023
- Preceded by: Jeannine O'Rourke (interim); John Nicklow

Personal details
- Education: University of Massachusetts Amherst (BS, MS); Emory University (PhD)

Academic background
- Thesis: The effect of expertise on hierarchical systems of categorization (1992)
- Doctoral advisor: Carolyn B. Mervis

Academic work
- Discipline: Psychology
- Institutions: Indiana University–Purdue University Indianapolis; University of New Orleans

Kathy E. Johnson is an American psychologist and academic administrator who was the eighth president of the University of New Orleans. She was the chief academic officer of the Indiana University–Purdue University Indianapolis from 2015 to 2023.

== Career ==
Johnson earned a B.S. in psychology, summa cum laude (1987), and an M.S. in developmental psychology (1989) from the University of Massachusetts Amherst. She completed a Ph.D. in psychology focusing on cognition and development from Emory University in 1992.

Johnson joined the Indiana University–Purdue University Indianapolis (IUPUI) in 1993 as an assistant professor of psychology. She was promoted to associate professor in 1999 and professor in 2006. She served as chair of the department of psychology from 2008 to 2011. From 2011 to 2015, she was the associate vice chancellor for undergraduate education. In August 2015, she was promoted to executive vice chancellor and chief academic officer. While at the Indiana University-Purdue University Indianapolis she launched the Forum Network and the Institute for Engaged Learning. She was also involved with external organizations being the Coalition of Urban Serving Universities, the Association of Public and Land Grant Universities, and Complete College America.

In September 2023, she was named the 8th president of the University of New Orleans. She was the first female president of the institution.

In May 2026, she was named as St. Louis University's executive vice president and provost, becoming effective July 13, 2026.

== Personal life ==
Johnson is married to Richard Foran and they have five children.
