= Jeannine O'Rourke =

American academic administrator

Interim President of the University of New Orleans
- In office July 1, 2023 – November 1, 2023
- Preceded by: John Nicklow
- Succeeded by: Kathy Johnson

Personal details
- Born: Jeannine O'Rourke New Orleans, Louisiana, U.S.
- Children: 2
- Education: Louisiana State University (BA, MPA); University of New Orleans (PhD)

Academic background
- Thesis: College Students' Epistemological Beliefs: Differences by Domain and Educational Level. (2000)
- Doctoral advisor: Michael Stokes Paulsen

Jeannine O'Rourke Kahn is an American academic administrator serving as the provost and vice president for academic affairs for the University of Louisiana System since 2016. She became the interim president of University of New Orleans in July 2023.

== Life ==
O'Rourke was born in New Orleans to Bill and Cynthia O'Rourke. She earned a bachelor's degree in sociology (1990) and a Master of Public Administration (1992) from Louisiana State University (LSU). She completed a Ph.D. in higher education administration from the University of New Orleans (UNO) in 2000. Michael Stokes Paulsen was her major professor. O'Rourke's dissertation was titled College Students' Epistemological Beliefs: Differences by Domain and Educational Level.

O'Rourke was a Greek adviser at LSU. She later worked as a consultant for Booz Allen Hamilton and a career adviser at UNO. O'Rourke served as an academic adviser at Delgado Community College. She rejoined LSU as an assistant to the vice provost and later assistant vice chancellor. O'Rourke served as the assistant commissioner for academic affairs for the board of regents. In 2016, O'Rourke became the provost and vice president for academic affairs for the University of Louisiana System. In May 2023, she was named as the interim president of UNO following the resignation of John Nicklow. She assumed the role on July 1, 2023.

O'Rourke married Brad Kahn. She has two sons.
