= The Tech Talk =

- The May 15, 2014, front page of The Tech Talk
- Type: Student newspaper
- Founded: 1926
- Ceased publication: 2019
- Language: English
- Headquarters: Ruston, Louisiana
- OCLC number: 6174750
- Website: Archived official website at the Wayback Machine (archived 2021-05-06)

The Tech Talk was the student newspaper of Louisiana Tech University. The print edition of The Tech Talk was published on Thursdays during the regular school year, except during vacation and examination periods.

== History ==
The first newspaper published at Louisiana Tech was The Industrialist, published from 1897 to 1906. The next Louisiana Tech newspaper was called The Spizzerinktum. In 1926, the newspaper changed names to The Hilly Billy, and later in 1926, the name was changed to its current name, The Tech Talk.

In 2018, the print edition of the newspaper was discontinued, with the student newspaper converting to a digital publication. The Tech Talk ceased publication in 2019.
