= William S. Wainwright =

American administrator

William Wainwright

15th President of Southeastern Louisiana University
- Incumbent
- Assumed office June 2023
- Preceded by: John L. Crain

Personal details
- Education: University of Louisiana at Lafayette (BS); Northwestern State University (MEd); University of New Orleans (EdD)

William S. Wainwright is an American administrator who is the 15th president of Southeastern Louisiana University in Hammond, Louisiana.

== Education ==
Wainwright received his Bachelor of Science from the University of Southwestern Louisiana, now University of Louisiana at Lafayette, in criminal justice. He also has earned a masters of education from Northwestern State University and a doctorate of education from University of New Orleans.

== Career ==
Wainwright started his career as a grant coordinator for Louisiana Technical College in Bogalusa, Louisiana. He became the Dean of the Hammond, Louisiana Area Campus. During this time he worked with the community of Hammond on their Chamber of Commerce. He also created partnerships with the Tangipahoa Parish school system creating dual enrollment programs.

Beginning in June 2023 Wainwright became the 15th president of Southeastern Louisiana University.
