= Louisiana Tech University =

Public university in Ruston, Louisiana, US

- Former name: List: Industrial Institute and College of Louisiana (1894–1898) Louisiana Industrial Institute (1898–1921) Louisiana Polytechnic Institute (1921–1970)
- Motto: "Union, Confidence, Justice"
- Type: Public research university
- Established: July 6, 1894; 132 years ago
- Parent institution: University of Louisiana System
- Accreditation: SACS
- Academic affiliations: Space-grant
- Endowment: $117.9 million (2021)
- Budget: $140.0 million (2021)
- President: James B. "Jim" Henderson
- Students: 11,084
- Undergraduates: 10,183
- Postgraduates: 990
- Location: Ruston, Louisiana, United States; 32°31′39″N 92°38′51″W
- Campus: 1,774 acres (7.18 km^{2}); Distant town
- Other campuses: Bossier City; Shreveport
- Newspaper: The Tech Talk
- Colors: Blue and red
- Nicknames: Bulldogs; Lady Techsters; Dogs
- Sporting affiliations: NCAA Division I FBS – Sun Belt
- Mascots: Champ & Tech
- Website: www.latech.edu
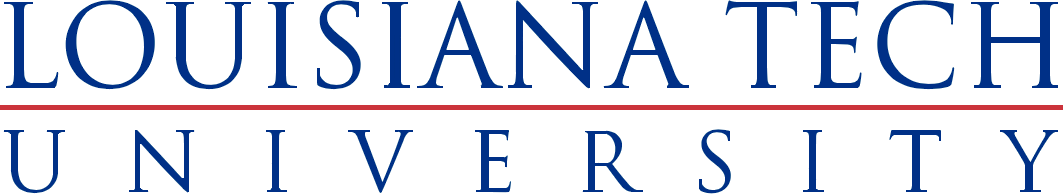

Louisiana Tech University (Louisiana Tech, La. Tech, or simply Tech) is a public research university in Ruston, Louisiana, United States. It is part of the University of Louisiana System and classified among "R2: Doctoral Universities – High research activity".

Louisiana Tech opened as the Industrial Institute and College of Louisiana in 1894 during the Second Industrial Revolution. The original mission of the college was for the education of students in the arts and sciences for the purpose of developing an industrial economy in post-Reconstruction Louisiana. Four years later in 1898, the state constitution changed the school's name to Louisiana Industrial Institute. In 1921, the college changed its name to Louisiana Polytechnic Institute to reflect its development as a larger institute of technology. Louisiana Polytechnic Institute became desegregated in the 1960s. It officially changed its name to Louisiana Tech University in 1970 as it satisfied criteria of a research university.

Louisiana Tech enrolled 12,463 students in five academic colleges during the Fall 2018 academic quarter including 1,282 students in the graduate school. In addition to the main campus in Ruston, Louisiana Tech holds classes at the Louisiana Tech University Shreveport Center, Academic Success Center in Bossier City, Barksdale Air Force Base Instructional Site, and on the CenturyLink campus in Monroe.

Louisiana Tech fields 16 varsity NCAA Division I sports teams (7 men's, 9 women's teams) and is a member of the Sun Belt Conference of the Football Bowl Subdivision. The university is known for its Bulldogs football team and Lady Techsters women's basketball program which won three national championship titles (1981, 1982, 1988) and made 13 Final Four appearances in the program's history.

== History ==
=== Early years ===
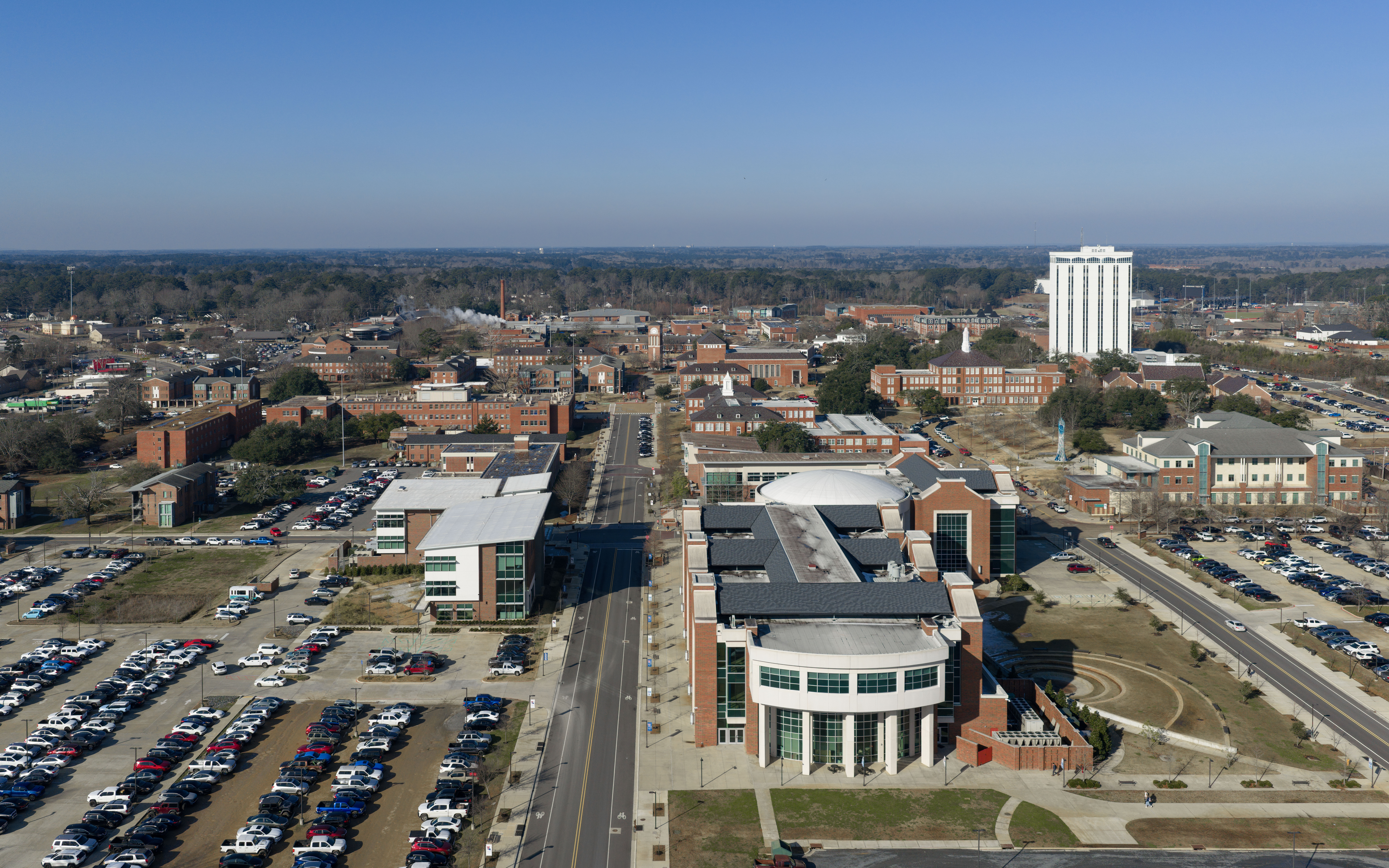
Aerial view of campus

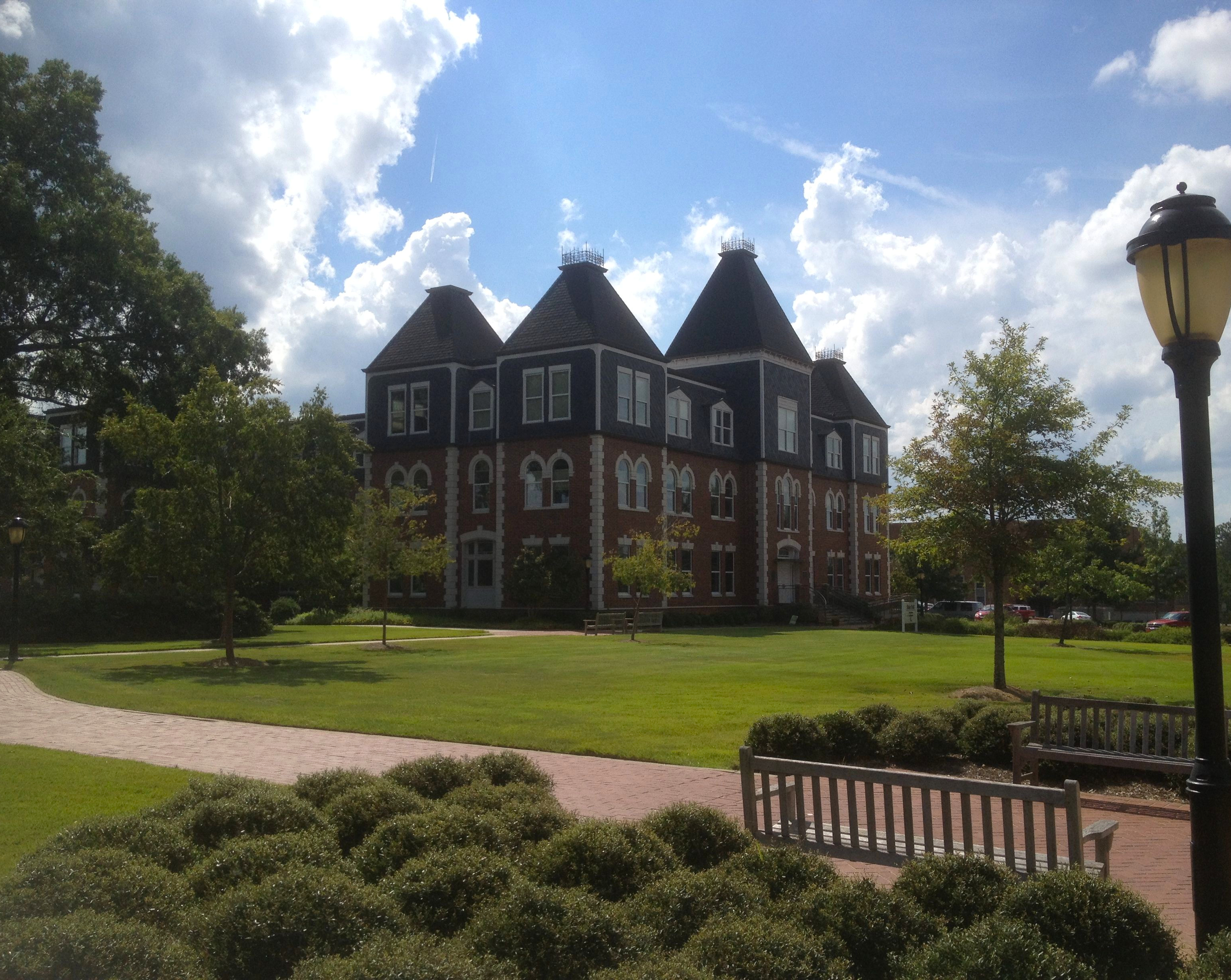
Hale Hall, once a men's dormitory, is now the home of the Louisiana Tech School of Architecture & Office of Admissions.

Ruston College, a forerunner to Louisiana Tech, was established in the middle 1880s by W. C. Friley, a Southern Baptist pastor. This institution lasted for seven years and had annual enrollments of about 250 students. Friley subsequently from 1892 to 1894 served as the first president of Hardin–Simmons University in Abilene, Texas, and from 1909 to 1910, as the second president of Louisiana College in Pineville.

On May 14, 1894, the Lincoln Parish Police Jury held a special session to outline plans to secure a regional industrial school. The police jury (a body similar to a county court or county commission in other states) called upon State Representative George M. Lomax to introduce the proposed legislation during the upcoming session. Representative Lomax, Jackson Parish Representative J. T. M. Hancock, and journalist, lawyer, and future judge John B. Holstead fought for the passage of the bill. On July 6, 1894, the proposed bill was approved as Act No. 68 of the General Assembly of Louisiana. The act established "The Industrial Institute and College of Louisiana", an industrial institute created for the education of white children in the arts and sciences.

In 1894, Colonel Arthur T. Prescott was elected as the first president of the college. He moved to Ruston and began overseeing the construction of a two-story main building. The brick building housed eight large classrooms, an auditorium, a chemical laboratory, and two offices. A frame building was also built nearby and was used for the instruction of mechanics. The main building was located on a plot of 20 acres (81,000 m^{2}) that was donated to the school by Francis P. Stubbs. On September 23, 1895, the school started its first session with six faculty members and 202 students.

In May 1897, Harry Howard became the first graduate. Colonel Prescott awarded him with a Bachelor of Industry degree, but there was no formal commencement. The first formal commencement was held in the Ruston Opera House the following May with ten graduates receiving their diplomas.

Article 256 of the 1898 state constitution changed the school's name to Louisiana Industrial Institute. Two years later, the course of study was reorganized into two years of preparatory work and three years of college level courses. Students who were high school graduates were admitted to the seventh quarter (college level) of study without examination. As years went by, courses changed and admissions requirements tightened. From 1917 to 1925, several curricula were organized according to the junior college standards and were offered leading to the Bachelor of Industry degree. In 1919, the Board of Trustees enlarged the curricula and started granting a standard baccalaureate degree. The first of these was granted on June 15, 1921, a Bachelor of Science in Engineering.

The Constitution adopted June 18, 1921, changed the name of the school in Article XII, Section 9, from Louisiana Industrial Institute to Louisiana Polytechnic Institute, or "Louisiana Tech" for short.

=== Expansion ===
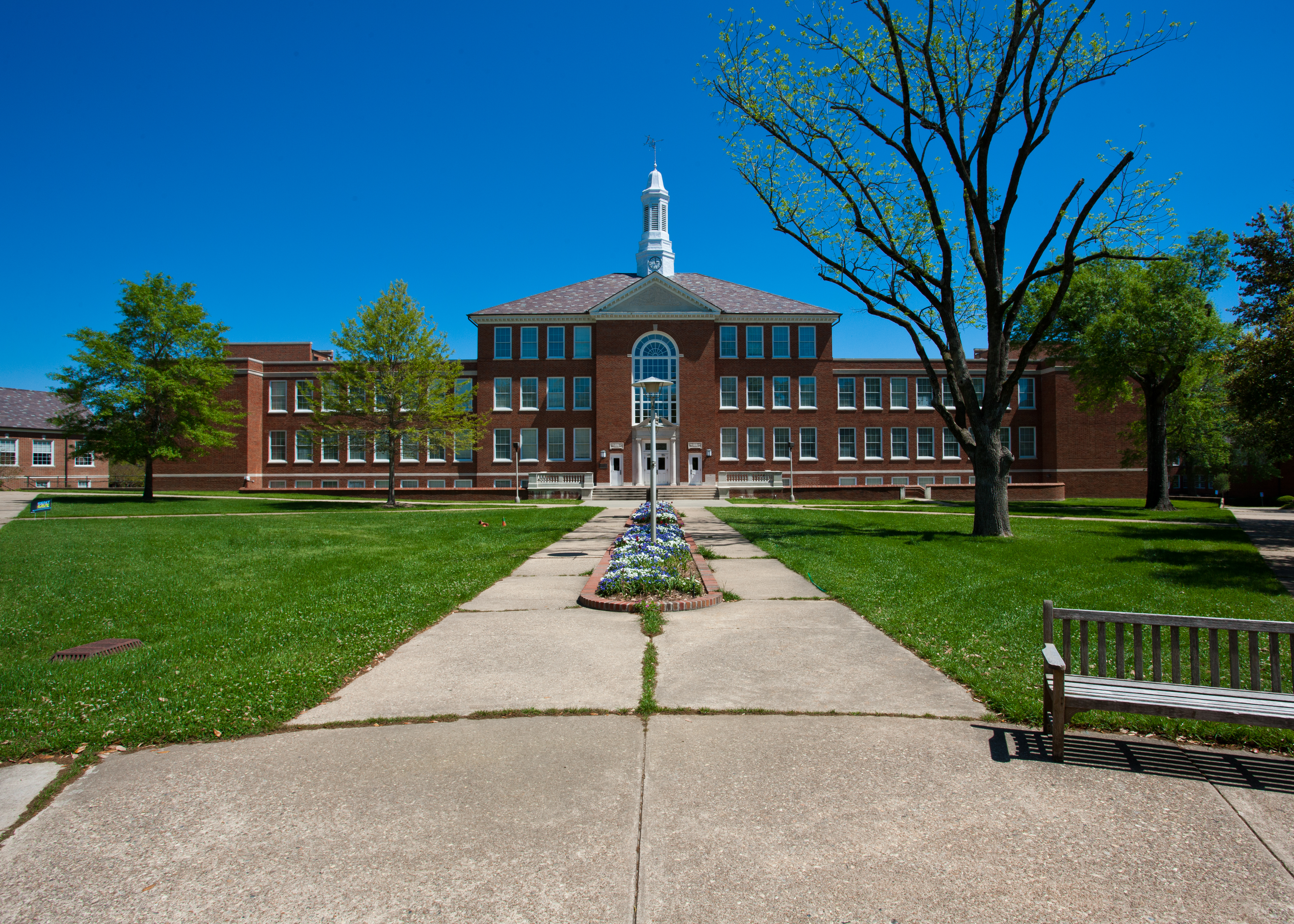
Keeny Hall: Administrative building dates to the middle 1930s; designed, along with several other Tech buildings by architect Edward F. Neild of Shreveport.

The Main Building, also known as Old Main, was destroyed after a fire in December 1936, but the columns that marked the entrance remain in place behind Prescott Memorial Library. By June 1936, construction on a new administration building had begun. On completion in January 1937, it was named Leche Hall in honor of then Governor Richard W. Leche of New Orleans. The building was renamed after the death of former university president, J. E. Keeny, and remains the remodeled Keeny Hall.

Louisiana Polytechnic Institute experienced an infrastructure growth spurt in 1939 and 1940. Seven buildings were designed by architect Edward F. Neild and completed at a cost of $2,054,270. These were Aswell Hall (girls' dormitory), Robinson Hall (men's dormitory for juniors and seniors), Tolliver Hall (880-seat dining hall), Bogard Hall (the Engineering Building), the S.J. Wages Power Plant, Reese Agricultural Hall (located on the South Campus Tech Farm), and the Howard Auditorium & Fine Arts Building.

During World War II, Louisiana Polytechnic Institute was one of 131 colleges and universities nationally that took part in the V-12 Navy College Training Program which offered students a path to a Navy commission.

After World War II, old army barracks were used to construct the student union and bookstore. It was known as the "Tonk" because it resembled a honky tonk. The building was replaced 15 years later but its nickname remained.

In 1959, four students were awarded the first master's degrees by the institution.

=== University era ===
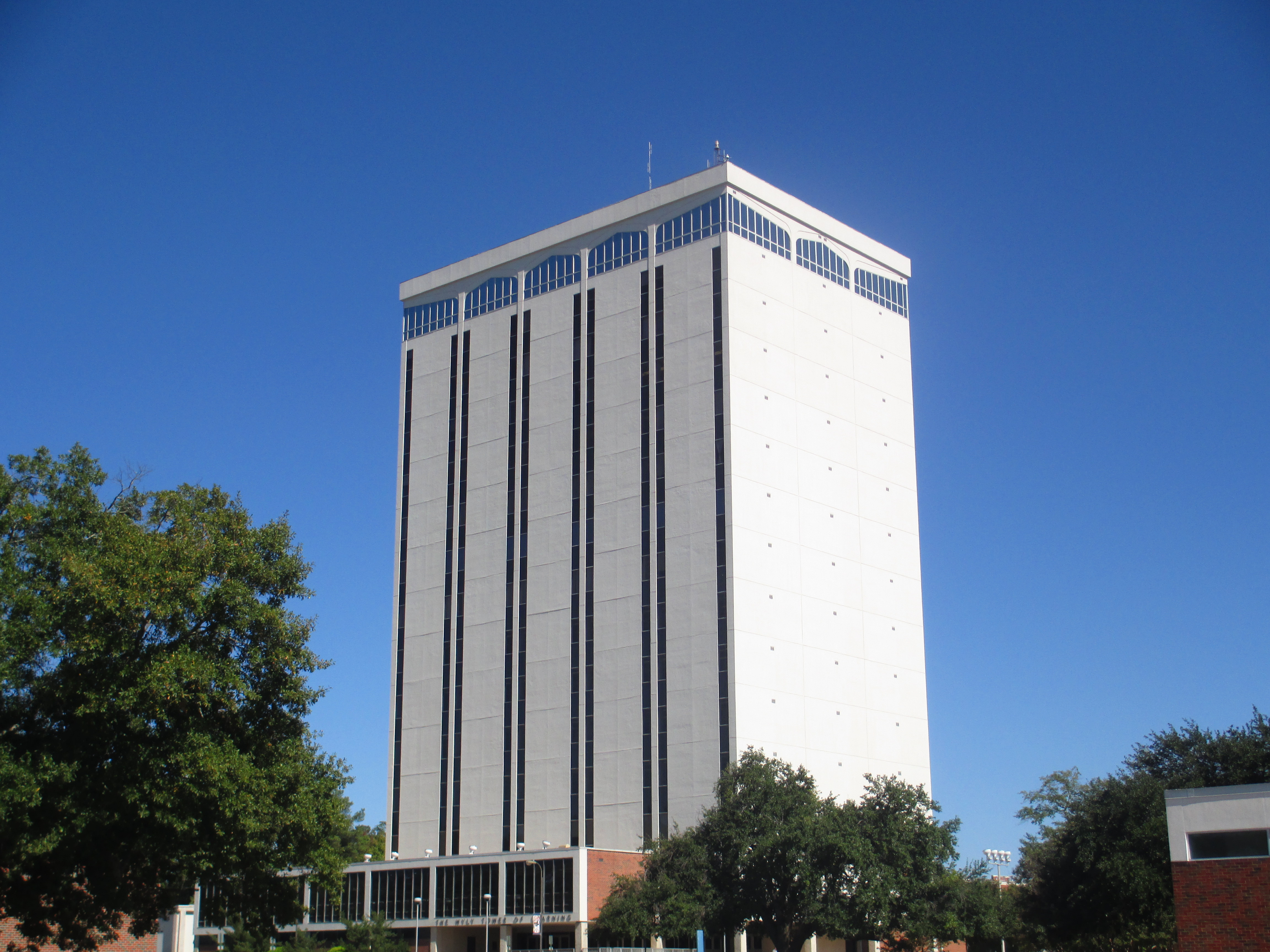
The 16-story Wyly Tower of Learning, named for the benefactors Sam Wyly and Charles Wyly, is the most prominent building on the Louisiana Tech campus in Ruston, Louisiana. It was designed by the Bastrop architect Hugh G. Parker Jr. Though the Wyly Tower is the landmark campus structure, the university is planning to have the structure razed to make way for a revised library facility. The tower has been cited for lack of ventilation, asbestos, difficulty of providing fire protection, and stairwells do not exit to the exterior of the building.

In 1962, Foster Jay Taylor became the 12th President of the Louisiana Polytechnic Institute, having succeeded Ralph L. Ropp. During his twenty-five years at president, Dr. Taylor oversaw the transformation of the former Louisiana Polytechnic Institute into Louisiana Tech University. The university's enrollment grew from about 3,000 students in 1962 to roughly 12,000 students in 1987. The first African-American students at Louisiana Tech, James Earl Potts (a transfer student from the nearby HBCU Grambling State University) and Bertha Bradford-Robinson, were admitted in the spring of 1965.

Most of the modern buildings on the Main Campus were either built or renovated during Taylor's tenure as university president. The main athletic facilities were constructed during the Taylor Era including Joe Aillet Stadium, the Thomas Assembly Center, J.C. Love Field, and the Lady Techster Softball Complex. In addition to the athletic facilities, the 16-story Wyly Tower, Student Bookstore, Nethken Hall (Electrical Engineering building), the University President's House, and the current College of Business Building were built on the Main Campus. In order to house the increasing student body of Louisiana Tech, Taylor led the construction of Graham, Harper, Kidd, Caruthers, and Neilson residence halls.

Taylor's time as Louisiana Tech president also marked the beginning of Lady Techster athletics. In 1974, Taylor established the Lady Techsters women's basketball program with a $5,000 appropriation. He hired Sonja Hogg, a 28-year-old PE instructor at Ruston High School, as the Lady Techsters' first head coach. Under Coach Hogg and her successor Leon Barmore, the Lady Techsters won three National Championships during the 1980s. In 1980, Taylor founded the Lady Techster Softball team with Barry Canterbury as the team's first head coach. The team made seven straight teams to the NCAA softball tournament and three trips to the Women's College World Series during the 1980s.

The first doctorate was awarded in 1971, a PhD in chemical engineering.

In 1992, Louisiana Tech became a "selective admissions" university. This university has increased their admissions criteria four times since 2000 by raising the minimum overall grade point average, composite ACT score, and class ranking.

Louisiana Tech has earned recognition from the Louisiana Board of Regents for its graduation rate and retention rate. According to a report of the Louisiana Board of Regents published in December 2011, Louisiana Tech has the second-highest graduation rate among the fourteen public universities in the state of Louisiana. The 53.3% 6-year graduation rate is the highest in the University of Louisiana System. Louisiana Tech has a 78.64% retention rate among incoming freshmen who stay with the same school after the first year, the top rate in the University of Louisiana System. The average time-to-degree ratio for Tech's graduates is 4.7 years, the fastest in the UL System.

Louisiana Tech became the first in the world to confer a Bachelor of Science degree in nanosystems engineering when Josh Brown earned his degree in May 2007. Continuing its mission as an engineering pioneer, Louisiana Tech also launched the nation's first cyber engineering BS degree in 2012.

As of May 2017, Louisiana Tech has awarded more than 100,900 degrees.

== Campus ==
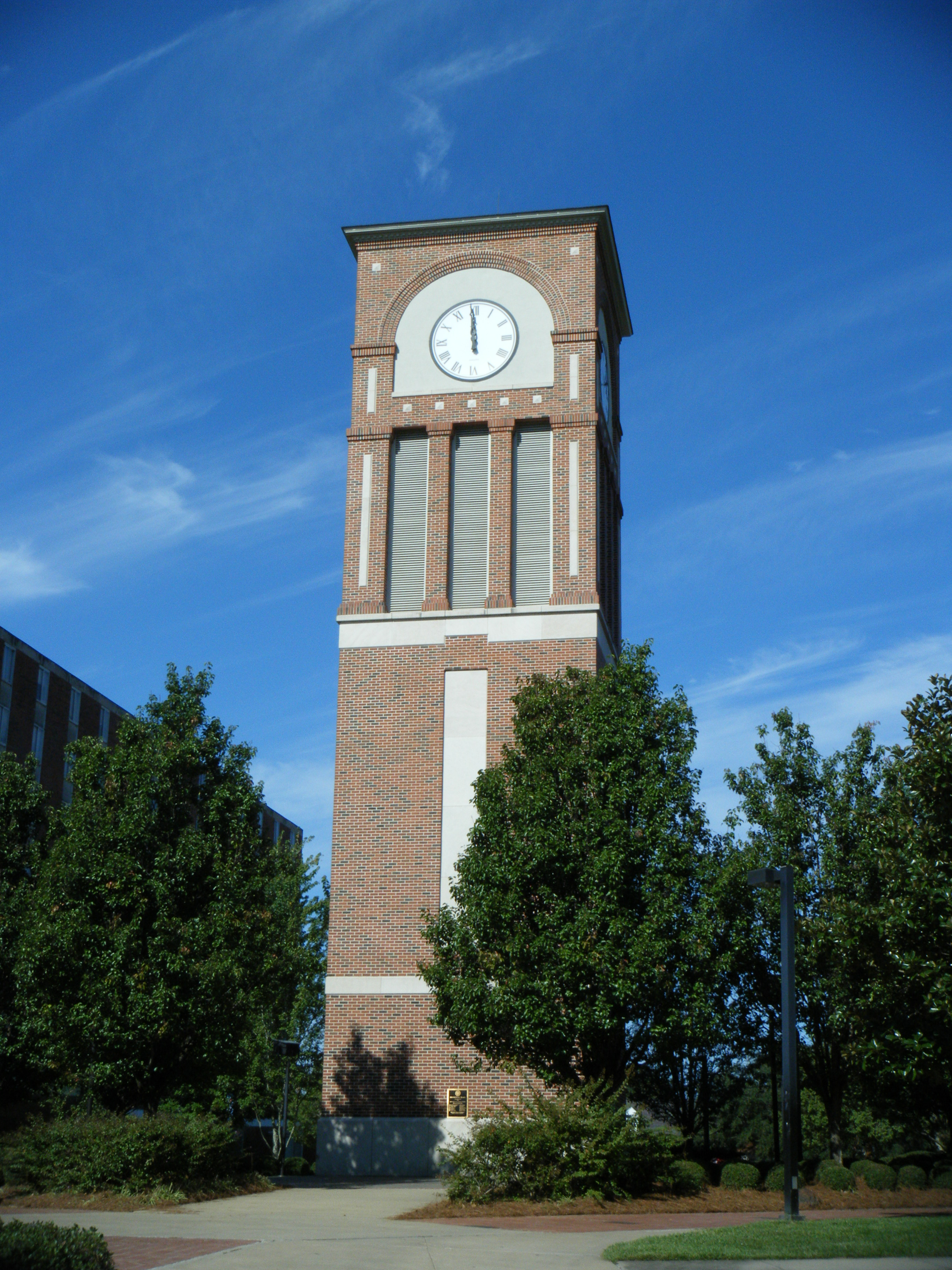
The Centennial Plaza Clock Tower

The campus of Louisiana Tech University is located in Ruston, Louisiana. The major roads that border or intersect the Tech campus are Tech Drive, California Avenue, Alabama Avenue, and Railroad Avenue. Interstate 20 and U.S. Highways 80 and 167 are located within one mile (1.6 km) of the Main Campus. In addition, a set of railroad tracks operated by Kansas City Southern Railway bisects the campus near Railroad Avenue.

The portion of the Main Campus located west of Tech Drive and north of the railroad include all of the university's major athletic facilities except for J.C. Love Field. The land east of Tech Drive and north of the railroad include the Lambright Intramural Center, J.C. Love Field, and the University Park Apartments. Most of the older residence halls are located near California Avenue and along Tech Drive south of the railroad tracks. The older part of the Main Campus is located south of Railroad Avenue. The Enterprise Campus is located on a 50-acre (200,000 m^{2}) plot of land east of Homer Street and bordering the oldest part of the Main Campus.

In addition to the Main Campus, Louisiana Tech also has 474 acres (1.92 km^{2}) of land located on the South Campus, 167 acres (0.68 km^{2}) of farm land west of the Main Campus, 603 acres (2.44 km^{2}) of forest land in Winn, Natchitoches, and Union Parishes, 30 acres (120,000 m^{2}) of land in Shreveport, a 44-acre (180,000 m^{2}) golf course in Lincoln Parish, 14 acres (57,000 m^{2}) of land for an arboretum west of the Main Campus, and a Flight Operations Center at Ruston Regional Airport.

=== Main campus ===
The Main Campus at Louisiana Tech University originated in 1894 as a 20-acre (81,000 m^{2}) plot of land with only two buildings, The Old Main Building and a frame building nearby used by the Department of Mechanics (the forerunner of the College of Engineering and Science). Today, the Main Campus is housed on 280 acres (1.1 km^{2}) of land with 86 buildings including 22 apartment buildings for the University Park Apartments on the north part of the campus. Many of the buildings, especially the older buildings, on the Main Campus are built in the Colonial Revival style. Bogard Hall, Howard Auditorium, Keeny Hall, University Hall (formerly the original Prescott Library), Reese Hall, Robinson Hall, and Tolliver Hall are all included on the National Register of Historic Places.

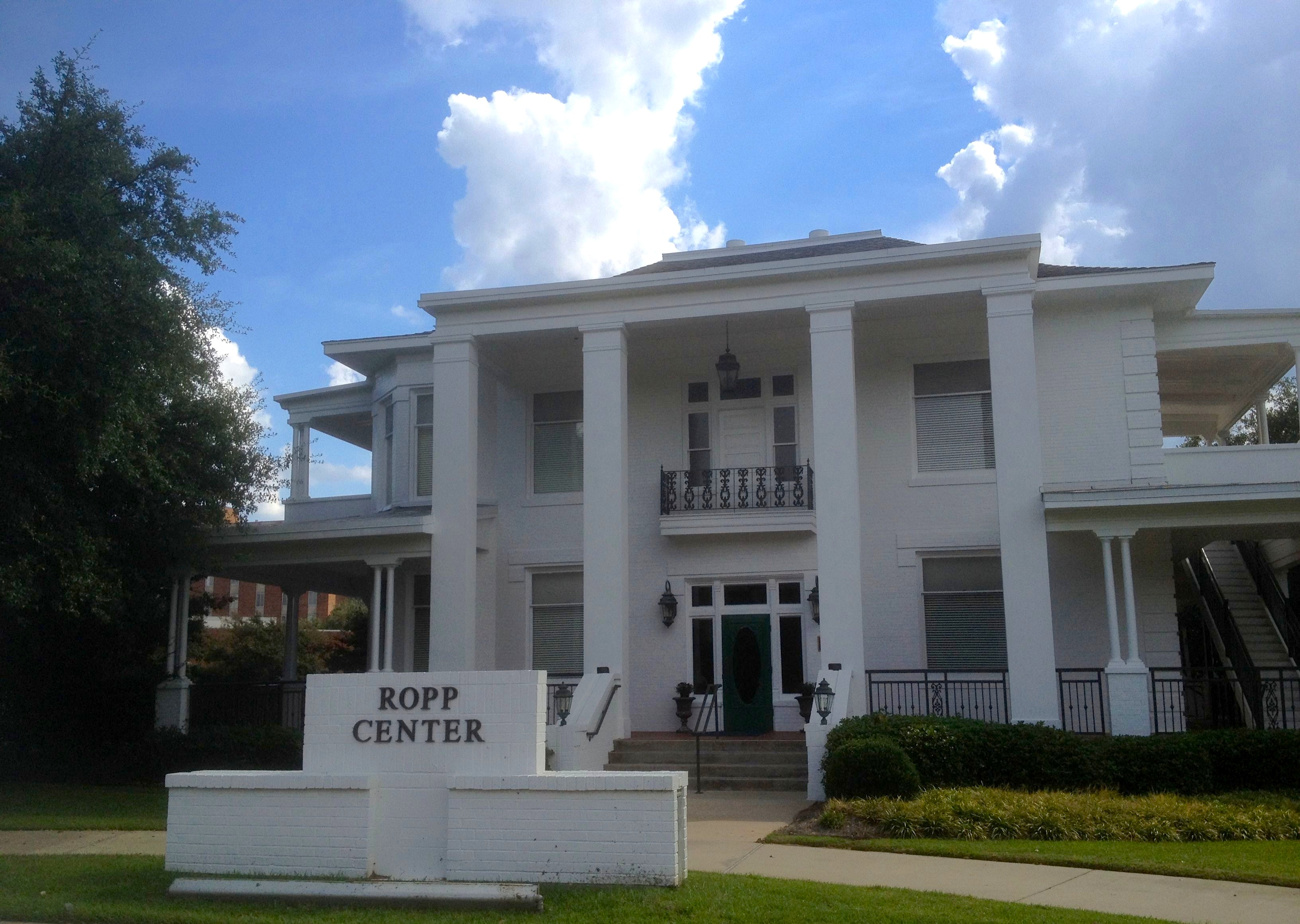
Ropp Center: The oldest existing building on the Tech campus

The oldest existing building on Louisiana Tech's campus is the Ropp Center. The Italian-style, wood-frame house was constructed in 1911 and is named after Ralph L. Ropp, Louisiana Tech's president from 1949 to 1962. The Ropp Center was the home of seven Louisiana Tech Presidents until a new president's house was built in 1972 on the west side of Tech's campus. The Ropp Center was used by the College of Home Economics for thirteen years until the Office of Special Programs moved into the building in 1985. In 2002, a $1 million renovation was completed to transform the Ropp Center into a faculty and staff club that is used for special events and housing for on-campus guests.

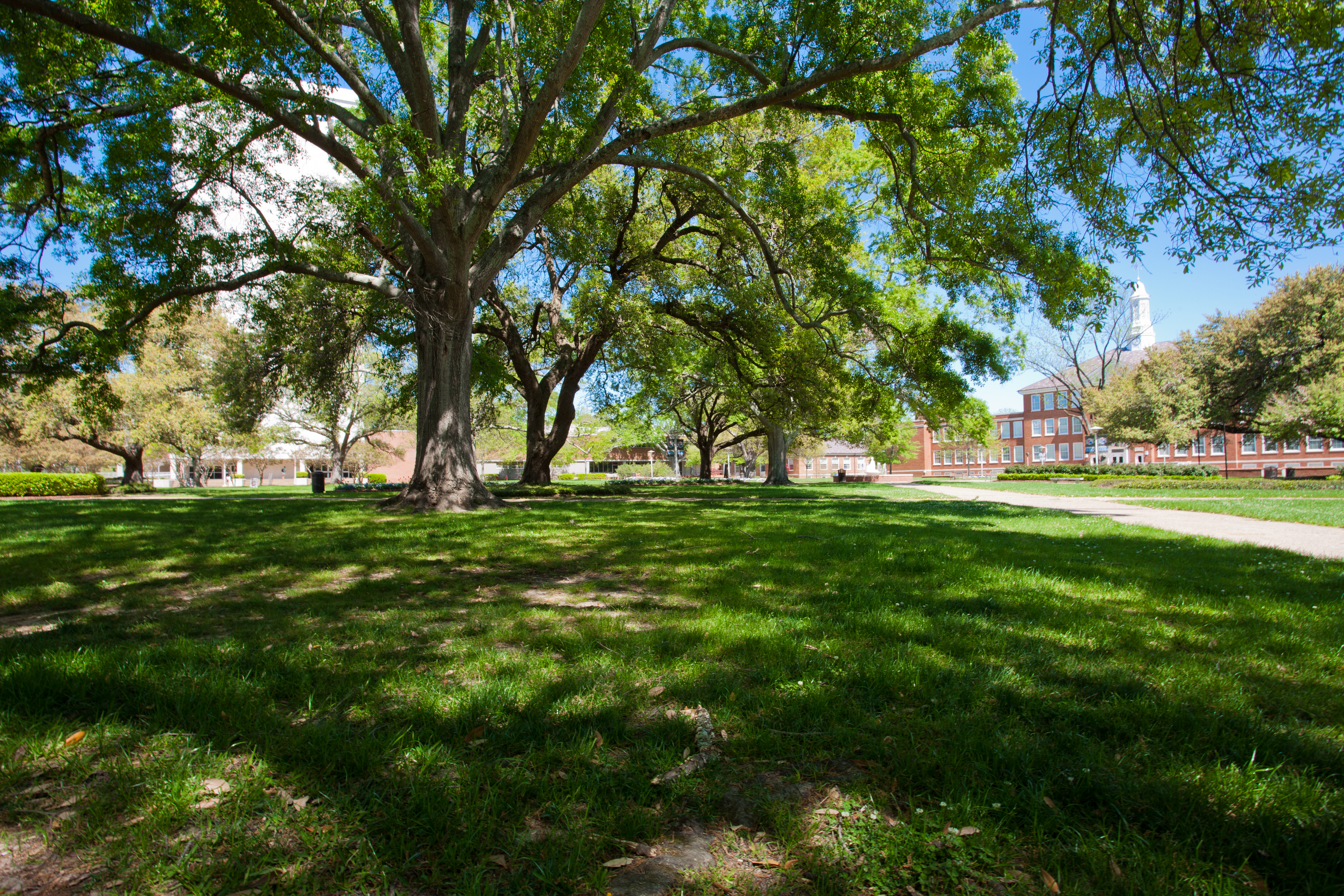
The Quadrangle (The Quad)

The Quadrangle (the Quad) is the focal point of the oldest part of the Main Campus. The Quad is described on the university’s website as being “considered […] one of the most peaceful and beautiful locations at Louisiana Tech”. Large oak trees and park benches all around the Quad provide students and visitors a quiet place to study and relax. At the center of the Quad is The Lady of the Mist sculpture and fountain, a landmark for students and alumni alike. The buildings surrounding the Quad are Keeny Hall, Howard Auditorium, the Student Center, the Bookstore, the Wyly Tower of Learning, the current Prescott Memorial Library, and the original Prescott Library now known as University Hall.

Another popular location on the Main Campus is Centennial Plaza. In 1994, Centennial Plaza was constructed to commemorate the 100th anniversary of Louisiana Tech's founding. The plaza was funded by a student self-assessed fee and designed specifically for the use and enjoyment of the student body. Centennial Plaza is used for special events throughout the year, such as Christmas in the Plaza, movie events, and student organizational fairs. Centennial Plaza is one of the main gathering points of the students due to the plaza's close proximity to the on-campus restaurants, coffee shops, dining halls, university post office, and offices for Student Life, SGA, and Union Board. At the center of the plaza is the Clock Tower which has the sound and digital capabilities to play the Alma Mater, Fight Song, and any other songs and calls as needed. The Alumni Brick Walkway runs through Centennial Plaza and around the Clock Tower. A large Louisiana Tech seal marks the middle of Centennial Plaza just west of the Clock Tower. Centennial Plaza is enclosed by Tolliver Hall, the Student Center, Howard Auditorium, and Harper Residence Hall.

Louisiana Tech has two main dining halls on Wisteria Drive on the west end of Centennial Plaza. The first dining hall is the Student Center which is home to the cafeteria, a smaller dining hall for eating and socializing, the La Tech Cafe, several small restaurants including Chick-fil-A, and the Tonk. The Student Center is also home to the CEnIT Innovation Lab, several large study areas, and a conference room. One of the three bronze bulldog statues is located on the first floor of the Student Center near the entrance of the Tonk. Students pet the bulldog statue for good luck as they walk by the statue.

The second student center on the Tech campus is Tolliver Hall. Tolliver Hall, named after Tech's first full-time dietitian Irene Tolliver, is located at the west end of Centennial Plaza near the Wisteria Student Center. This two-story building was built in the 1920s as one of three dining halls at Louisiana Tech. The eating area in the second floor remained open until it was shut down in the 1980s. In 2003, nearly $3 million was spent to renovate Tolliver Hall into a modern cyber student center. The second floor now houses a cyber cafe which includes computer stations, a McAlister's Deli restaurant, several smaller restaurants, a large dining area with big-screen televisions, and smaller tables surrounding the floor for dining and studying. The offices of the Louisiana Tech Student Government Association, Union Board, the International Student Office, and multicultural affairs are also housed on the second floor. The first floor is used as the post office for Tech's students, faculty, and administration officials.

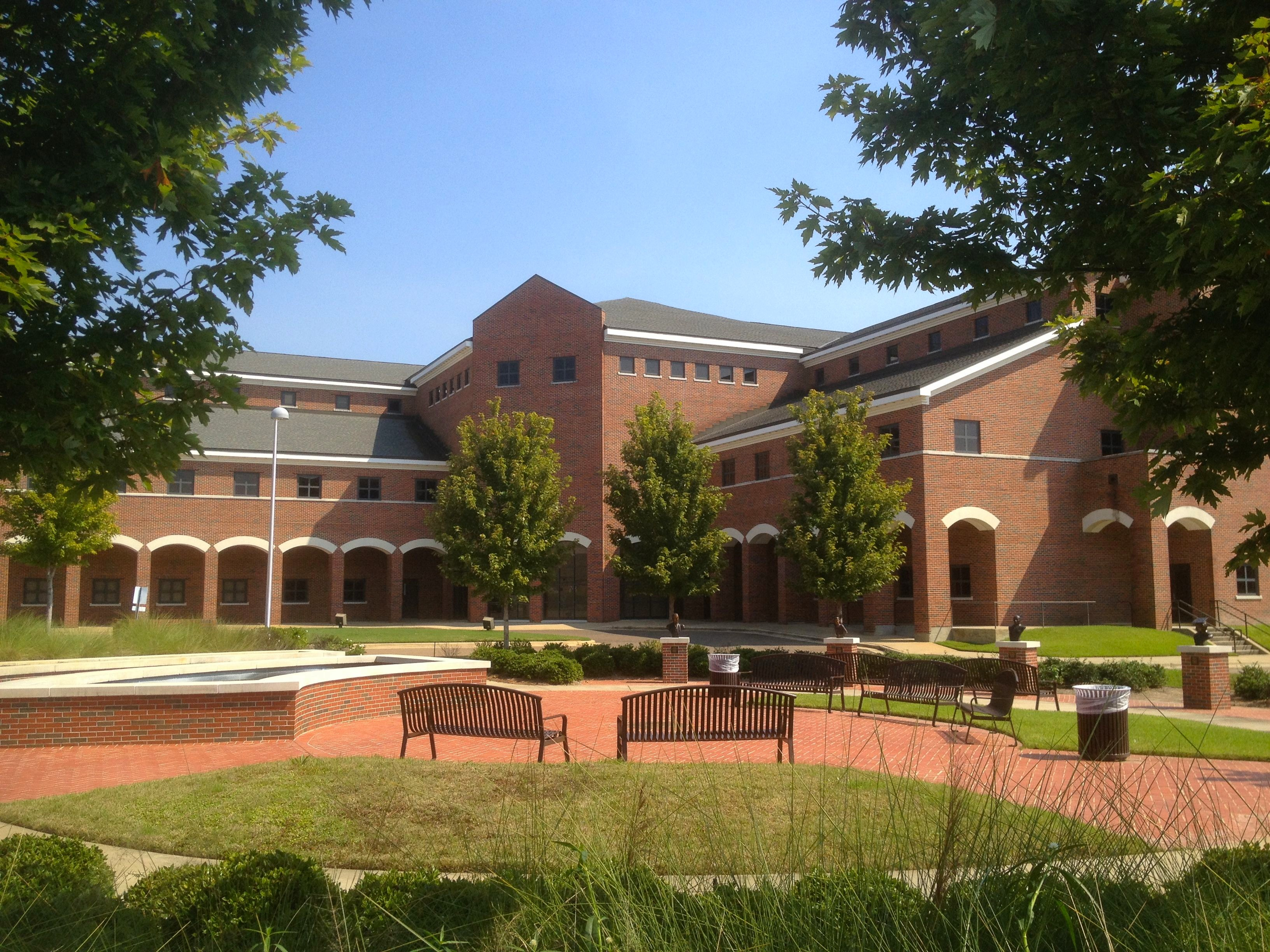
Davison Hall: Home of the Professional Aviation Department

In the past decade, Louisiana Tech built new buildings and renovated some of the Main Campus' older buildings. The university erected Davison Hall (home of the university's Professional Aviation program), the Micromanufacturing Building, and the Biomedical Engineering Building on the south end of the Main Campus along Hergot Avenue. Tech tore down the old Hale Hall and constructed a brand-new Hale Hall in the style and design of the predecessor in 2004. On the eastern edge of the campus, the university renovated the building now known as University Hall, redesigned the bookstore interior, and made needed repairs to Keeny Hall and Howard Auditorium. All of the major athletics facilities on the north part of the Main Campus have received major upgrades and renovations in the past five years.

Construction started in early 2011 on a new College of Business building. The 42,000-square-foot (3,900 m^{2}) facility serves as the centerpiece of the entrepreneurship and business programs of the College of Business. The building features new classrooms, two auditoriums, computer labs, research centers, meeting rooms, and career and student support centers. Louisiana Tech has announced plans to construct a new 60,000-square-foot (5,600 m^{2}) College of Engineering and Science building adjacent to Bogard Hall.

The campus also hosts the Idea Place, a science museum; A.E. Phillips Lab School, a K-8 school which is recognized as a "Five Star School" by the Louisiana Department of Education; and the Joe D. Waggonner Center for Bipartisan Politics and Public Policy.

=== South Campus ===
South Campus is located southwest of the main campus in Ruston and covers nearly 900 acres (364 ha). It is home to the School of Agricultural Science and Forestry, Center for Rural Development, Equine Center, John D. Griffin Horticultural Garden, the Trenchless Technology Center (TTC) laboratories, and Tech Farm. The Tech Farm Salesroom markets dairy, meat, and plant products produced and processed by Tech Farm to the public. Students enrolled in agriculture or forestry programs attend classes in Reese Hall, the agricultural laboratory, and in Lomax Hall, the forestry and plant science complex which is home to the Louisiana Tech Greenhouses, Horticultural Conservatory, and the Spatial Data Laboratory.

=== Enterprise Campus ===
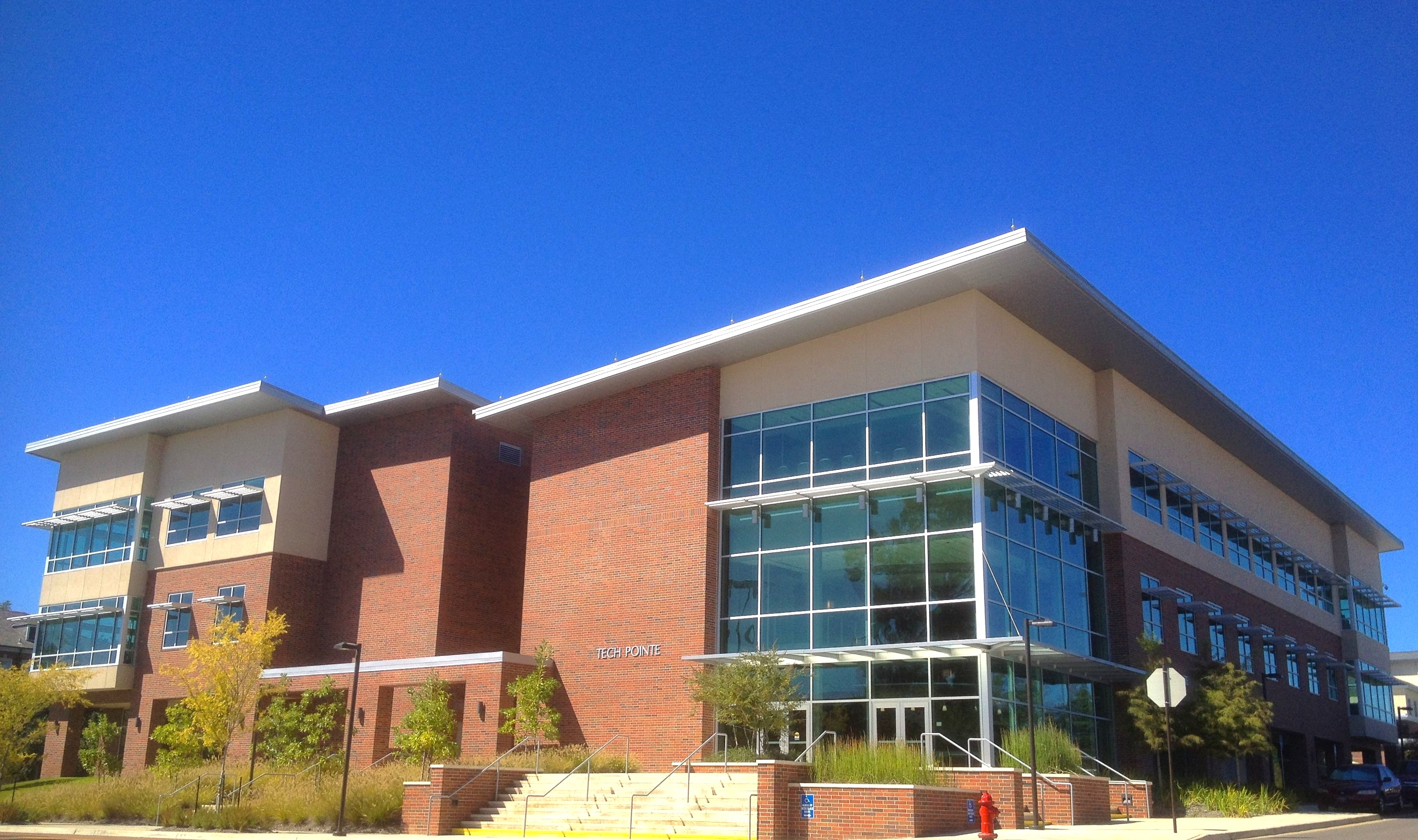
Tech Pointe

In Fall Quarter 2009, the university broke ground on the new Enterprise Campus which will expand the campus by 50 acres (20 ha) upon completion. The Enterprise Campus will be a green building project and will be a research facility available to technology companies and businesses. The Enterprise campus will also try to bridge the Engineering and Business colleges with the addition of the Entrepreneurship and Innovation Center (EIC).

In 2010, Louisiana Tech finished the renovations of the old Visual Arts Building by transforming that building into the new Entrepreneurship and Innovation (E&I) Center. The E&I Center will be the central hub for the Center for Entrepreneurship and Information Technology's (CEnIT) programs and is located between the College of Business building and Bogard Hall (COES).

Louisiana Tech broke ground on Tech Pointe, the first building on the Enterprise Campus, in 2010. Tech Pointe will house the Cyberspace Research Laboratory as well as high-tech companies and start-up technology companies. The 42,000-square-foot (3,900 m^{2}) facility will include access to the Louisiana Optical Network Initiative (LONI), fiber-optic and Internet networks, advanced computing capabilities, and other information technology supports needed to meet the demands of 24/7 high-tech companies and specialized cyber security research. Tech Pointe is scheduled for completion sometime in 2011.

The university recently unveiled plans to build a new College of Engineering and Science (COES) building. The three-story, 127,000-square-foot (11,800 m^{2}) building will provide new active learning class labs; engineering shops; and meeting rooms for classes in math, science, and engineering. The new COES building will provide new learning space for the university's first-year and second-year engineering and science students for the first time since the completion of Bogard Hall in 1940. Upon completion of the new College of Engineering and Science building, Louisiana Tech plans to renovate and improve Bogard Hall.

=== Barksdale Campus ===
Since September 1965, Louisiana Tech has offered on-base degree programs through its satellite campus at Barksdale Air Force Base in Bossier City, Louisiana. The university works in conjunction with the Department of the Air Force to provide postsecondary education programs that are designed to meet the needs of Air Force personnel. While the primary focus of the Barksdale campus is to educate Air Force personnel, civilians are permitted to take part in the classes offered at the Barksdale campus if space is available. All courses offered at Tech Barksdale are taught on-base or online. The administrative offices for the Louisiana Tech Barksdale Air Force Program are located in the Base Education Center.

== Academics ==
=== Student body ===
As of the Fall 2018 quarter, Louisiana Tech had an enrollment of 12,463 students pursuing degrees in five academic colleges. The student body has members from every Louisiana parish, 43 U.S. states, and 64 foreign countries. Louisiana residents account for 85.0% of the student population, while out-of-state students and international students account for 11.1% and 4.0% of the student body, respectively. The student body at Louisiana Tech is 69.4% white, 13.3% black, 3.8% international students, and 13.5% other or "unknown" ethnicity. The student body consists of 50.2% women and 49.8% men.

The Fall 2016 incoming freshmen class at Louisiana Tech consisted of 2,018 students. This incoming freshmen class had an average 24.7 ACT score, with 31% scoring between 27–36 and 45% scoring between 22 and 26. Of the 2015 freshmen class, 83.0% are Louisiana residents, 16.3% are out-of-state students, and 0.7% are international students. Louisiana Tech's 2015 freshman class includes ten National Merit Scholars and one National Achievement Scholar.

As of Fall 2015, the College of Engineering and Science had the largest enrollment of any college at Louisiana Tech with 22.9% of the student body. The College of Education, College of Liberal Arts, the College of Applied and Natural Sciences, and the College of Business had 18.4%, 14.0%, 13.1%, and 9.5%, respectively. About 22.2% of the student body were enrolled in Basic and Career Studies.

=== Rankings ===
Academic rankings

National
- Forbes: 437
- U.S. News & World Report: 318 (tie)
- Washington Monthly: 411
- WSJ/College Pulse: >600

Global
- THE: 801–1000
- U.S. News & World Report: 770

In the 2022–2023 U.S. News & World Report ranking of public universities, Louisiana Tech is ranked 163rd, and Louisiana Tech is ranked in Tier One of national universities at 317th. Forbes 2022 edition of America's Top Colleges ranked Louisiana Tech as the 204th best public college in the nation, the 230th best research university in the nation, the 437th best college overall, and the 93rd best college in the South. According to Washington Monthly's 2022 National University Rankings, which consider research, community service, social mobility, and net price of attendance, Louisiana Tech ranked 411th nationally. The Wall Street Journal/Times Higher Education College Rankings 2022 ranked Louisiana Tech >600 in the United States. Times Higher Education World University Rankings 2020 which measure an institution's performance across teaching, research, knowledge transfer, and international outlook ranked Louisiana Tech 801–1000th in the world. Times Higher Education World University Rankings named Louisiana Tech one of twenty universities in the world that are rising stars and could challenge the elites to become globally renowned by the year 2030.

Money magazine named Louisiana Tech the best college in Louisiana in their 2016 The Best College in Every State publication. In addition, Louisiana Tech ranked 235th in Money's Best Colleges, which ranked schools based on value by assessing educational quality, affordability, and alumni success. Forbes 2019 edition of America's Best Value Colleges ranked Louisiana Tech as the 159th best overall value for all American colleges and universities. In the 2018 Kiplinger's Personal Finance Best College Values rankings, Louisiana Tech ranked No. 1 for all Louisiana public colleges, 65th of all public colleges in the nation, and 189th of all public and private colleges in the United States. In the 2016 U.S. News & World Report Best Colleges rankings, Louisiana Tech ranked No. 1 among public national universities and 6th among all national universities for graduating students with the least amount of debt. Louisiana Tech ranked 6th in Business Insider's 2015 Most Underrated Colleges In America rankings. According to the 2015–2016 PayScale College Salary Report salary potential for all alumni, Louisiana Tech ranks first among all public and private institutions in Louisiana, 60th nationally among public schools, 84th nationally among research universities, and 184th nationally among all universities and colleges.

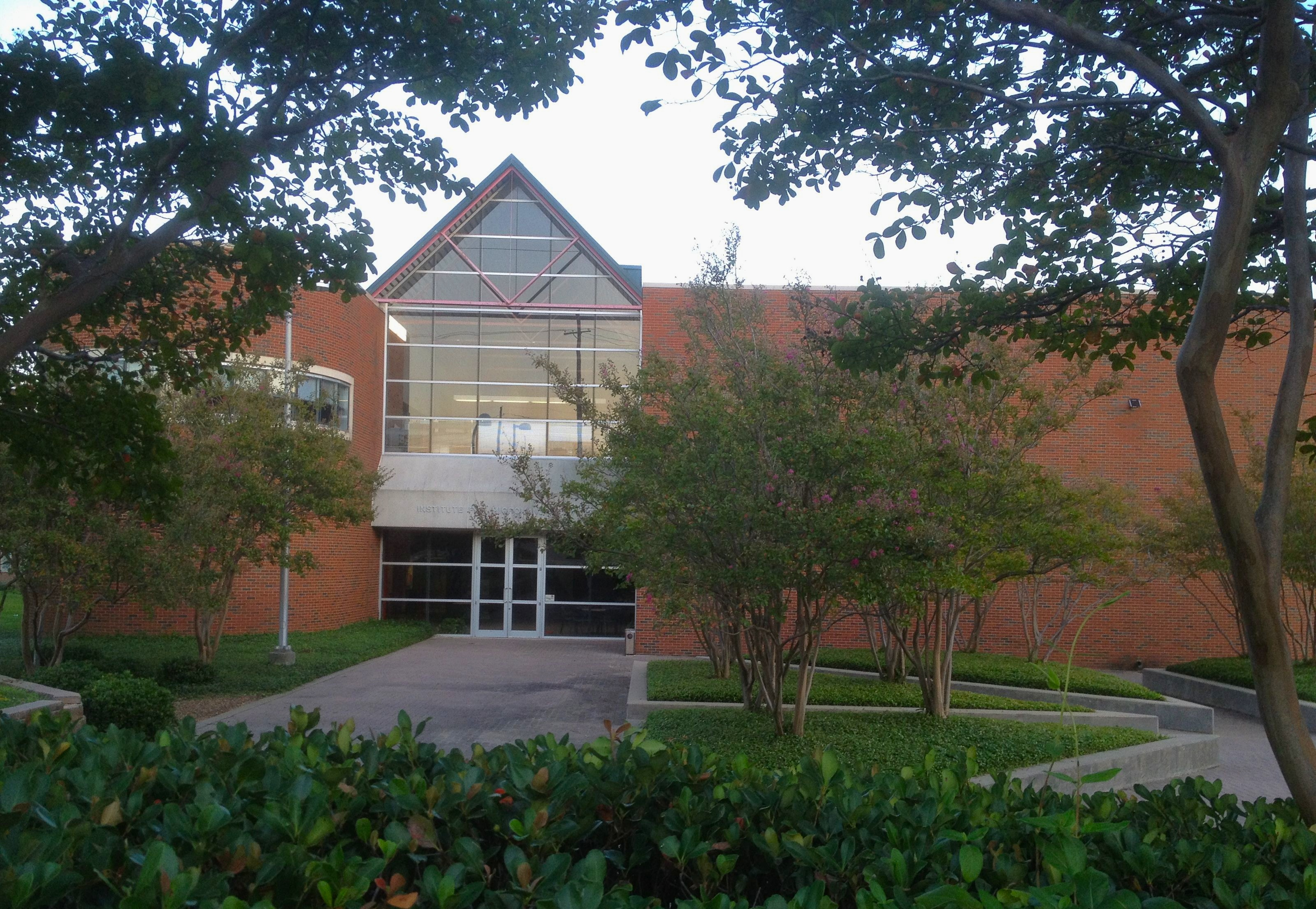
Institute for Micromanufacturing

Several of Louisiana Tech's graduate programs were named to the 2021 U.S. News & World Report list of Best Graduate Schools including the College of Business, Doctor of Audiology, Biomedical Engineering, College of Education, Master of Arts in Speech–Language Pathology, and College of Engineering. In the 2020 U.S. News & World Report Best Colleges rankings, Louisiana Tech's undergraduate engineering program ranked 134th in the nation, and Tech's undergraduate business program ranked 224th. The online Professional MBA was named to the 2020 U.S. News list of Best Online Programs. In the 2019 U.S. News & World Report Best Grad Schools rankings, Louisiana Tech ranked 145th in engineering, 141st in speech–language pathology, and 185th in education.

=== Colleges ===
The university confers associate, bachelor's and master's degrees through its five academic colleges. Additionally, Louisiana Tech offers doctoral degrees in audiology, business administration, counseling psychology (accredited by the American Psychological Association), industrial/organizational psychology, computational analysis and modeling, engineering, and biomedical engineering, with a joint MD–PhD program with the Louisiana State University Health Sciences Center Shreveport.

==== College of Applied and Natural Sciences ====
The College of Applied and Natural Sciences is made up of the School of Agricultural Sciences and Forestry, School of Biological Sciences, Department of Health Informatics and Information Management, School of Human Ecology, and Division of Nursing.

==== College of Business ====
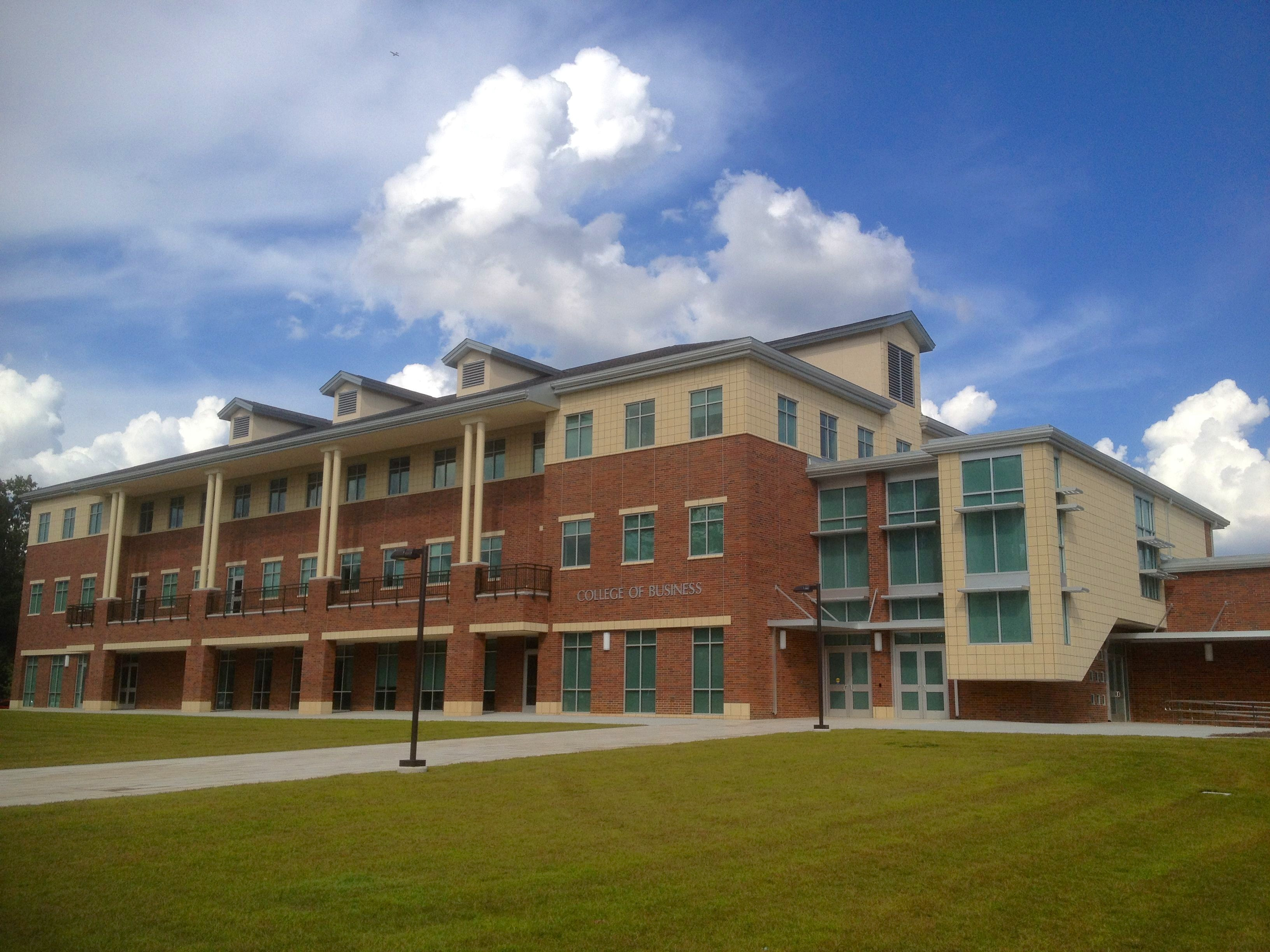
College of Business

Louisiana Tech University's College of Business houses the Department of Economics & Finance, Department of Marketing & Analysis, Department of Management & Sustainable Supply Chain Management, School of Accountancy, and Department of Computer Information Systems. The college offers eight undergraduate degree programs in addition to the Master of Business Administration, Master of Accountancy, and Doctor of Philosophy (Ph.D.) in Business Administration.

The MBA is offered in several delivery modes including Traditional, Professional (online), Hybrid (with a focus on Information Assurance), and Executive. The Executive MBA is housed in Louisiana Tech's Bossier City Academic Success Center and is specifically designed for students who already have management experience. Structured to provide minimal disruption to work schedules, students pursuing the Executive MBA meet for classes every other weekend (Friday evenings and all-day on Saturday). The College of Business also offers several certificate programs.

The college has been accredited by AACSB International since 1955, when the School of Business Administration was one of 78 schools of business in the United States to become members of the American Association of Collegiate Schools of Business. The MBA program was initially accredited in 1978, and the School of Accountancy was among the initial 20 schools receiving separate Accounting accreditation and the first in Louisiana.

The college houses the Center for Information Assurance, the Center for Entrepreneurship and Information Technology (CEnIT), the Academy of Marketing Science, and the Center for Economic Research, as well as The DATA BASE for Advances in Information Systems journal. It is also designated by the National Security Agency (NSA) and the Department of Homeland Security (DHS) as a Center of Academic Excellence in Cyber Defense Research and Education.

==== College of Education ====
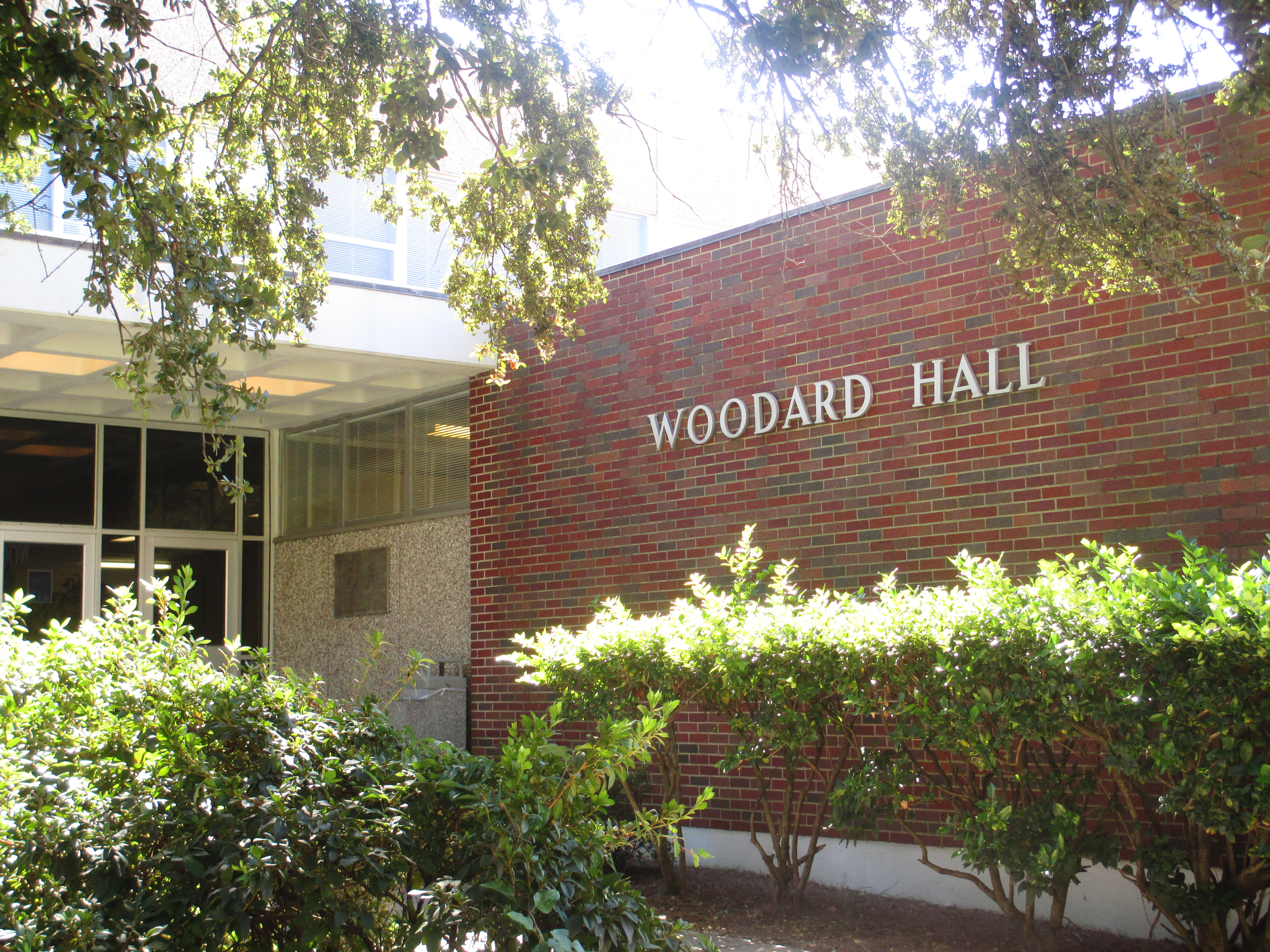
Woodard Hall, headquarters of the Tech Education Department, opened in the 1960s.

The College of Education traces its mission back to the origins of Louisiana Tech in 1894, where the preparation of teachers was one of the early missions of the institution. In 1970, the School of Education was elevated to the level of College.

Today, the College of Education consists of three separate departments: The Department of Curriculum, Instruction, and Leadership, The Department of Kinesiology, and The Department of Psychology and Behavioral Sciences. Together, the three academic departments award thirty-five different academic degrees ranging from the baccalaureate to the doctoral levels.

Notable subdivisions of the College of Education include A.E. Phillips Laboratory School, the Science and Technology Education Center, the NASA Educator Resource Center, The IDEA Place, and the Professional Development and Research Institute on Blindness.

==== College of Engineering and Science ====
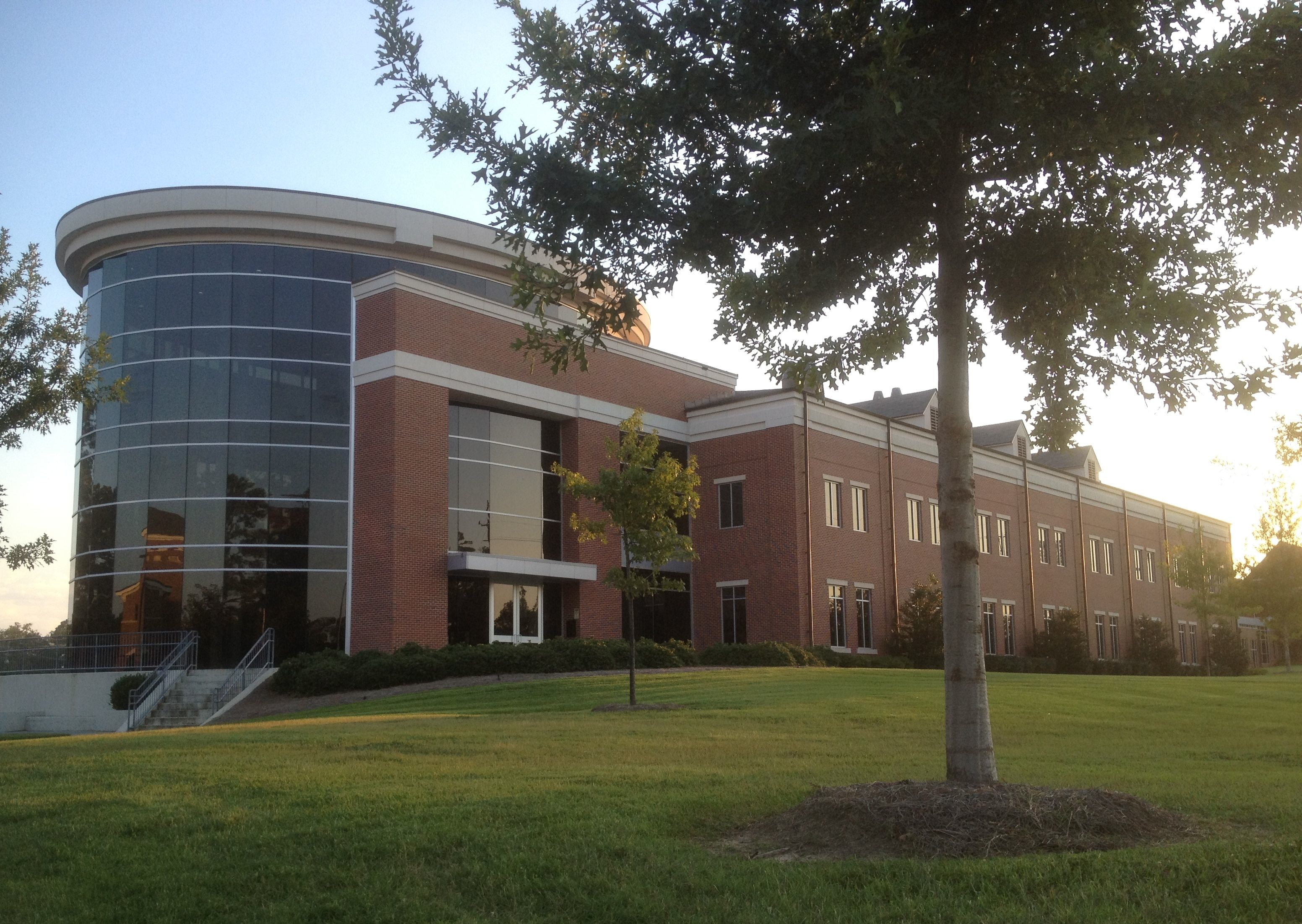
Biomedical Engineering Building

The College of Engineering and Science (COES) is the engineering school at Louisiana Tech University. The COES offers thirteen undergraduate degrees including seven engineering degrees, two engineering technology degrees, and four science degrees. The college also offers seven Master of Science degrees and four Doctorate degrees.

The college started as the Department of Mechanics in 1894 with a two-year program in Mechanic Arts. Since its founding, the college expanded its degree program to include chemical engineering, civil engineering, electrical engineering, industrial engineering, and mechanical engineering. The COES began offering one of the first biomedical engineering curriculum programs in the United States in 1972 and the first nanosystems engineering BS degree in 2005. Louisiana Tech launched the nation's first cyber engineering BS degree in 2012.

Bogard Hall is the second home of the College of Engineering and Science. Louisiana Tech constructed the building in 1940 and named it after Frank Bogard, the former Dean of Engineering at Louisiana Tech. The college also utilizes Nethken Hall, the Biomedical Engineering Building, the Institute for Micromanufacturing, the Engineering Annex building, the Trenchless Technology Center (TTC), and parts of Carson-Taylor Hall for the college's activities. In early 2011, Louisiana Tech announced plans to construct a new Integrated Engineering and Science Building adjacent to Bogard Hall. The 60,000-square-foot (5,600 m^{2}) building now provides classrooms and meeting rooms for engineering, science, and math students at Louisiana Tech. In 2019, the Integrated Engineering and Science Building (IESB) was completed, and the College of Engineering and Science Undergraduate Studies moved to the new building. Bogard Hall continues to host the College of Engineering and Science Graduate Studies. In the Winter Quarter of 2019–2020, students were able to begin using the new classrooms and study spaces. Louisiana Tech University is one of 60 colleges or Universities that can certify students in Lean Six Sigma Certifications.

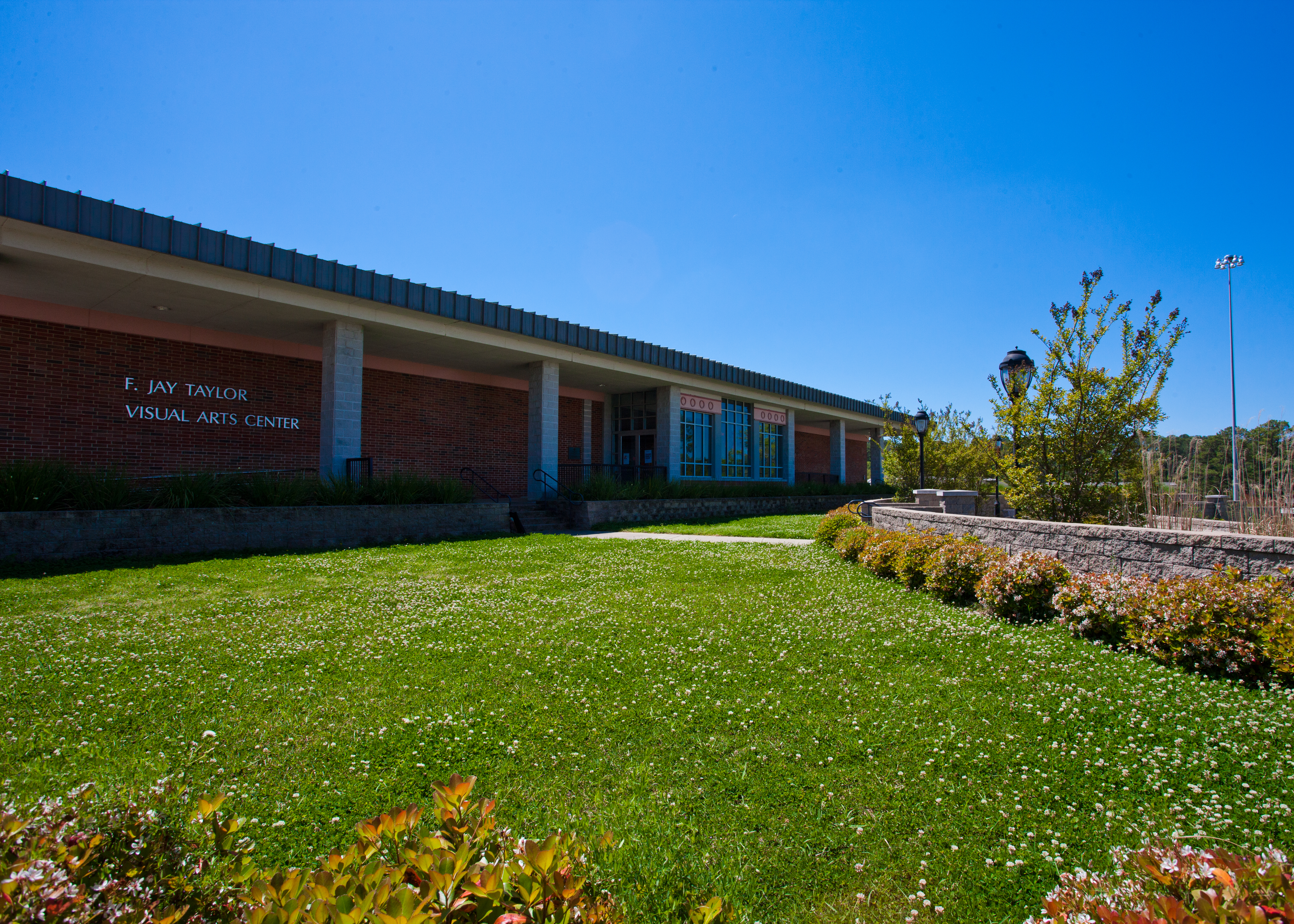
The F. Jay Taylor Visual Arts Center is the main building for LaTech's School of Design.

==== College of Liberal Arts ====
The College of Liberal Arts consists of nine academic departments: Architecture, Art, History, Journalism, Literature and Language, Performing Arts, Professional Aviation, Social Science, and Speech. The college offers 26 degree programs, including 19 bachelors, 6 masters, and the doctorate degree in audiology

The College of Liberal Arts hosts the Louisiana Tech University Honors Program. Tech's Air Force Reserve Officer Training Corps (ROTC) Detachment 305 is also part of the College of Liberal Arts.

Centers

- American Foreign Policy Center – Created in 1989, the American Foreign Policy Center at Louisiana Tech University is a joint initiative of the Department of History and Prescott Memorial Library. The center's goals are to encourage research in the field of U.S. foreign policy, and to promote public awareness of world affairs. The center is located on the fourth floor of Prescott Library.
- Joe D. Waggonner Center for Bipartisan Politics and Public Policy – The Waggonner Center fosters and promotes active and responsible civic engagement through an interdisciplinary combination of academic research, innovative curricular initiatives, and community outreach. The center brings together faculty from across Louisiana Tech University who take as their point of departure the intersection of American principles, institutions, and public policy. By working across traditional academic disciplines, the Waggonner Center aims to create an unprecedented academic experience that engages faculty, students, and community stakeholders alike.

Galleries
The School of Design at Louisiana Tech University has two gallery spaces available to artists working in all media including: painting, drawing, video, printmaking, installation, sculpture, photography, ceramics, fiber, and digital works. Several calls for entry are open year-round. The mission of the galleries at The School of Design at Louisiana Tech University is to contribute to student and community learning through exposure to the work and philosophy of nationally recognized contemporary artists working in the visual arts. The SOD Galleries accept unsolicited submissions on a rolling basis, which are reviewed quarterly by the Gallery Committee.

=== Interdisciplinary centers ===
Center for Entrepreneurship and Information Technology (CEnIT)

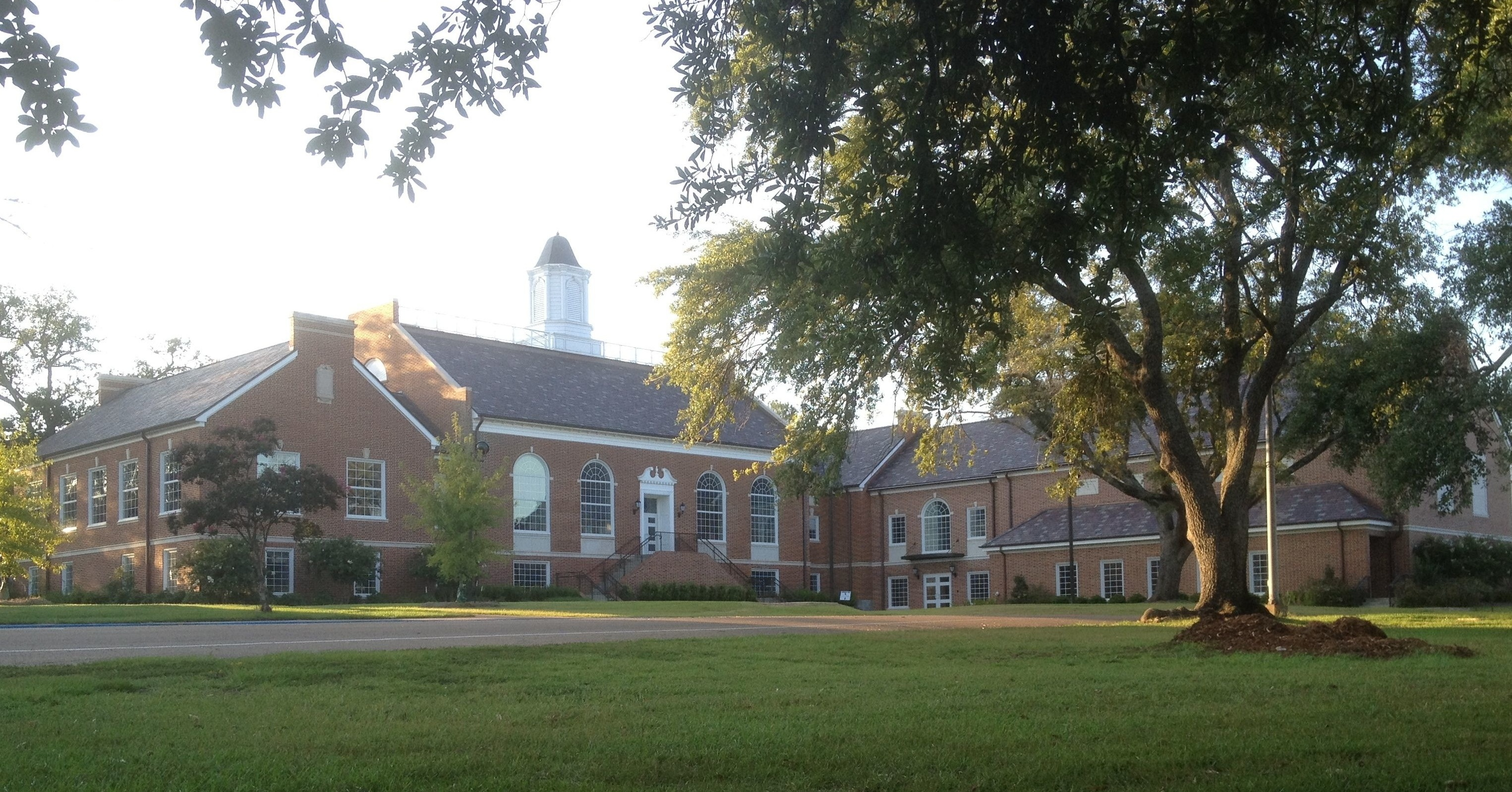
University Hall, home of the Entrepreneurship and Innovation Center

In 2001, Louisiana Tech proposed the creation of the Center for Entrepreneurship and Information Technology (CEnIT), a collaboration between the College of Engineering & Science (COES) and the College of Business (COB). The CEnIT focuses the resources of the two colleges and their related centers in promoting entrepreneurial research, technology transfer, and education. The CEnIT was approved in 2002 by the University of Louisiana System Board of Supervisors and the Louisiana Board of Regents. As of 2011, the CEnIT is housed in the 3,000-square-foot (280 m^{2}) CEnIT Innovation Lab on the main floor of the Student Center next to The Quad. The center will move to the newly renovated University Hall building located next to the College of Business sometime in 2011.

The Top Dawg Competition was created in 2002 by the Association of Business, Engineering, and Science Entrepreneurs (ABESE), now known as Bulldog Entrepreneurs. The annual competition is hosted by Bulldog Entrepreneurs and in conjunction with the CEnIT, COES, College of Business, and the Technology Business Development Center (TBDC). The competition started as the Top Dawg Business Plan Competition in 2002 and expanded six years later to include the Idea Pitch Competition. The total amount of money awarded during each competition to the competing teams has grown since 2002 to $14,500 for the 2011 Competition. In addition to prize money from the COES and College of Business, additional prize money is awarded by Jones Walker, Louisiana Tech's Innovation Enterprise Fund, and the Ruston-Lincoln Parish Chamber of Commerce.

=== Continuing education and distance learning ===
Global_Campus

Louisiana Tech established the Global_Campus on September 16, 2008. The campus offers a variety of degree programs, certificate programs, and general education courses. Global_Campus focuses on providing more flexibility and choices to Tech's traditional students and complete online education services to non-traditional students, such as military, international, and dual enrollment students.

As of 2011, Global_Campus offers over 275 distance learning courses while more courses are in development. Louisiana Tech has six master's degree programs, two bachelor's degree programs, and one associate degree program available via distance learning. In addition to the nine degree programs, Global_Campus offers eight professional development programs.

CenturyLink@LaTech

In the Fall of 2011, Louisiana Tech and CenturyLink created a partnership called "CenturyLink@LaTech" to meet the workforce development and training needs of CenturyLink. It is designed for CenturyLink employees with general responsibilities and interests in telecommunications engineering, information technology or information systems.

CenturyLink@LaTech offers a Communications Systems Graduate Certificate.

== Student life ==
Undergraduate demographics as of Fall 2023
Race and ethnicity	Total
White	74%
Black	11%
Unknown	6%
Hispanic	5%
International student	2%
Two or more races	2%
Asian	1%
Economic diversity
Low-income (Note: The percentage of students who received an income-based federal Pell grant intended for low-income students.)	27%
Affluent (Note: The percentage of students who are a part of the American middle class at the bare minimum.)	73%

=== Activities ===
Louisiana Tech has over 163 officially recognized student organizations. Students can opt to participate in Student Government, Union Board, TechTV, Lagniappe, Greek, religious, honor, service, spirit, intramurals, club sports, pre-professional, and special interest organizations.

The Louisiana Tech University Union Board organizes entertainment activities for Louisiana Tech students throughout the entire school year. About 80 students participate in Union Board each academic school year. The Union Board receives an annual budget of about $210,000 in Student Assessment Fees and uses the money to organize and produce the annual Fall Fling, Talent Show, Spring Fling, Tech the Halls, the Miss Tech Pageant, RusVegas casino night, and other special events.

The Student Government Association (SGA) is the official governing body of the Louisiana Tech University Student Association (the student body) and consists of three branches; the Student Senate, Executive Branch, and the Supreme Court. The organization is responsible for the Welcome Week/Dawg Haul activities, Homecoming Week, the Big Event, short term student loans, voter registration drives for the student body, and other various activities throughout the year.

Louisiana Tech and neighboring Grambling State University operate an ROTC exchange program. Louisiana Tech operates the Air Force ROTC while Grambling operates the Army ROTC, and students from either school may participate in either program.

Since 2006, Louisiana Tech has played host to Summer Leadership School for Air Force Junior Reserve Officer Training Corps cadets from public school systems all over the United States. It is operated by normal USAF retirees, but mostly by college level Cadet Training Officers. These sessions are held towards the end of the month of June for nine days.

=== Media ===
The Tech Talk was Louisiana Tech's official student newspaper from 1926 to 2019. The Tech Talk was published every Thursday of the regular school year, except for finals week and vacation periods. The award-winning newspaper had been honored by the Southeast Journalism Conference (SEJC), Louisiana Press Women, National Federation of Press Women, Louisiana Press Association, and the Society of Professional Journalists. The Tech Talk was named the 10th Best Newspaper in the South in 2010 and the 3rd Best Newspaper in the South in 2011 by the Southeast Journalism Conference.

The Lagniappe is Tech's yearbook. The Lagniappe, which literally means "something extra" was first published in 1905 and has been published every year since except for 1906, 1913–1921, 1926, and 1944–1945. The yearbook's annual release date is around the last week of the regular school year in the middle of May.

Louisiana Tech's local radio station is KLPI. The radio station was founded as WLPI-AM in 1966 and originally housed in a rented office on Railroad Avenue in downtown Ruston. By 1974, construction was completed on KLPI-FM, and the radio station began broadcasting at 10 watts. Afterward, WLPI-AM was shut down due to maintenance problems with the station's equipment. For a while the station was located at the southeast corner of the Student Center at the heart of the Tech campus. With the 2022 makeover of Centennial Plaza the KLPI station was moved and is once again moving around campus. KLPI transmits at 4,000 watts of power.

Louisiana TechTV is the official student-run television station at Louisiana Tech since its launch in 2000. TechTV shows newly released movies, TechTV news, personal news clips by the general student body, original programming like Tech Cribs, Tech Play, and informational slides for upcoming campus events.

=== Residential life ===
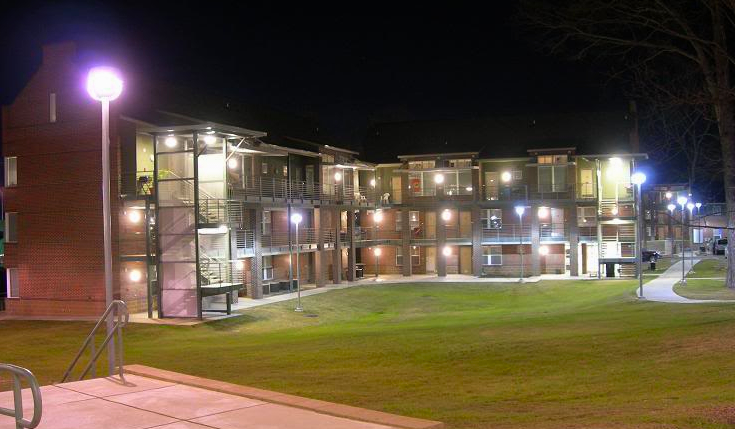
University Park apartments

The newest Halls Cottingham, Richardson, Mitchell, are all 3 stories dormitories that offer Suits, Single and Flex Private rooms. With them all 3 being new construction. They are gendered by floor unlike the older Residence Halls.

=== Greek life ===
Louisiana Tech has approximately 20 Greek organizations.

In 2002 and 2005, hazing incidents were reported at the fraternity Kappa Alpha Order .

== Athletics ==
Louisiana Tech's sixteen varsity athletic teams compete in NCAA Division I sports as a member of the Sun Belt Conference. The university's seven men's teams and eight out of nine of the women's teams are known as the Bulldogs, and the women's basketball team is known as the Lady Techsters. The teams wear the university colors of red and blue except for the women's basketball team that wears their signature Columbia blue.

=== Football ===
Louisiana Tech's football team played its first season in 1901 and has competed at the NCAA Division I Football Bowl Subdivision (FBS) level from 1975 to 1981 and 1989 to present. In its 122 years of existence, Tech's football program has won three National Championships (1972-National Football Foundation Co-National Champions, 1973-Division II National Champions, 1974-UPI College Division National Champions), played in 13 major college bowl games (8–4–1 overall record), and earned 25 conference titles. Its former players include 50 All-American players including Terry Bradshaw, Fred Dean, Willie Roaf, Matt Stover, Ryan Moats, Josh Scobee, Troy Edwards, Tim Rattay, Luke McCown, Tramon Williams, and Ryan Allen .

The football team competes as a Division I FBS institution in Conference USA. The Bulldogs are coached by head coach Sonny Cumbie and play their home games at Joe Aillet Stadium on the north end of the Tech campus.

=== Men's basketball ===
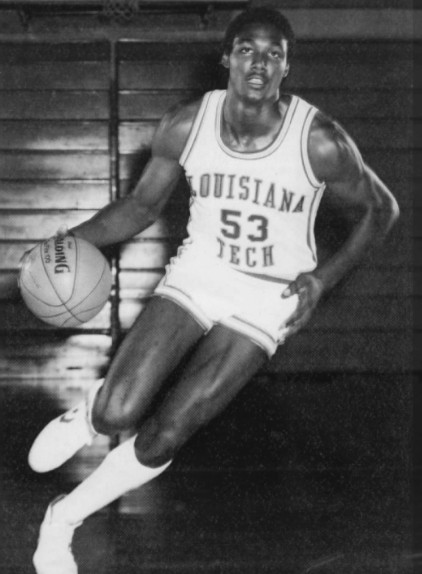
Karl Malone

The Louisiana Tech Bulldogs men's basketball program started in the 1909–10 season under Head Coach Percy S. Prince. The basketball team has won 25 regular season conference titles and 6 conference tournament championships. In addition, the Dunkin' Dawgs have earned 6 NCAA tournament and 9 NIT appearances. The Bulldog program reached the NCAA or the NIT tournaments nine straight years from 1984 to 1992.

Three Bulldogs have had their numbers retired by Louisiana Tech. These are Lady Techster Head Coach Leon Barmore (#12), Karl Malone (#32), and collegiate All-American player Jackie Moreland (#42). Other notable former Bulldog players include Mike Green, Paul Millsap, Scotty Robertson, P. J. Brown, and Tim Floyd.

The Bulldogs are led by head coach Talvin Hester and play their home games on Karl Malone Court at the Thomas Assembly Center.

=== Women's basketball ===
The Lady Techsters women's basketball program was founded in 1974 with Sonja Hogg as its first head coach. The Lady Techsters have won three national championships (1981, 1982, 1988), 20 regular season conference championships, and 16 conference tournament championships. The program has also appeared in eight national championship games, 13 Final Fours, and 27 NCAA women's basketball tournaments including 25 consecutive appearances from 1982 to 2006.

Alumni of the program include WNBA All-Stars Teresa Weatherspoon, Betty Lennox, and Cheryl Ford in addition to Women's Basketball Hall of Fame coaches Leon Barmore, Kurt Budke, Mickie DeMoss, Sonja Hogg, and Kim Mulkey. Three former assistant coaches of the Lady Techsters basketball team have won NCAA National Women's Basketball Championships as head coaches: Leon Barmore (1988 with Louisiana Tech), Kim Mulkey (2005, 2012, and 2019 with Baylor and in 2024 with LSU), and Gary Blair (2011 with Texas A&M). Also, former Lady Techsters assistant coach Nell Fortner won the gold medal at the 2000 Sydney Olympics as the head coach for the United States women's national basketball team.

The team played their home games at Memorial Gym on Louisiana Tech's campus from 1974 until 1982 when the Thomas Assembly Center was constructed. The team is coached by Brooke Stoehr.

== Traditions ==
=== Lady of the Mist ===
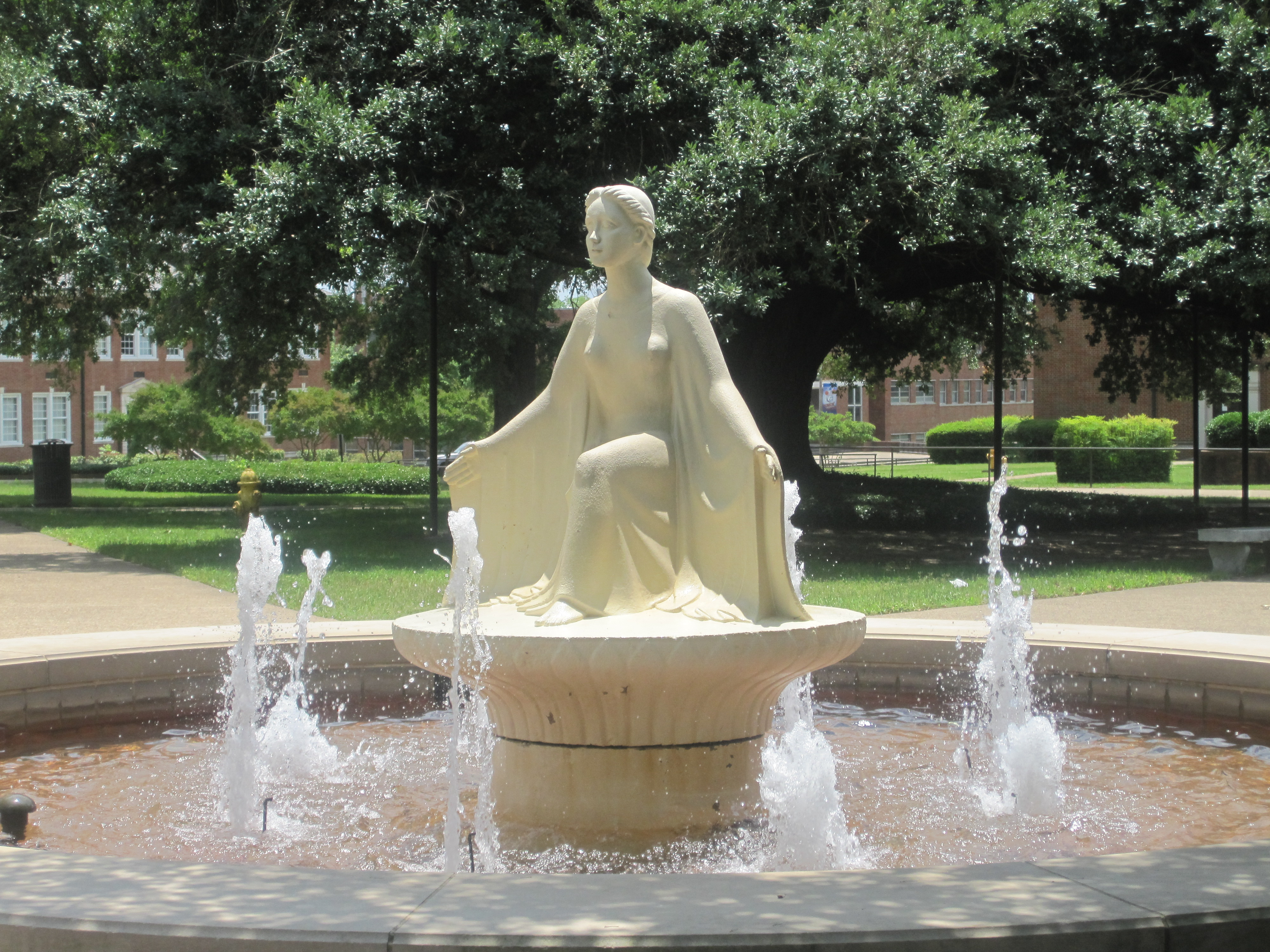
Lady of the Mist

The Lady of the Mist is one of the most recognizable landmarks on the Louisiana Tech Main Campus. The granite sculpture sits in the midst of a fountain in the middle of the quadrangle (The Quad), one of the focal points of the university and part of the older section of the Main Campus. The Lady of the Mist symbolizes "Alma Mater" welcoming new students and bidding farewell to Tech graduates. The statue also symbolizes the hope that Louisiana Tech graduates will fulfill their ambitions and highest callings in life.

The statue and fountain was funded in 1938 by the Women's Panhellenic Association of Ruston, the governing body of the university's sorority groups. The Lady of the Mist was the idea of Art & Architecture faculty member Mary Moffett and Art Department Chair Elizabeth Bethea. The Lady of the Mist was created by Duncan Ferguson and Jules Struppeck and specifically located in the middle of the Quad facing north toward the old north entrance columns of the Tech campus. This was done to welcome everyone to the campus as people looked through the north entrance columns to see the statue's open arms waiting to greet them.

The Lady fell into disrepair in the years after its construction. In 1985, the statue was restored through the efforts of the Student Government Association, Panhellenic, Residence Hall Association, and Association of Women Students. Today, the statue remains a focal point for students and alumni who return to the Tech campus. Incoming freshman commemorate their new beginning by tossing a gold medallion into the fountain.

=== Alumni brick walkway ===
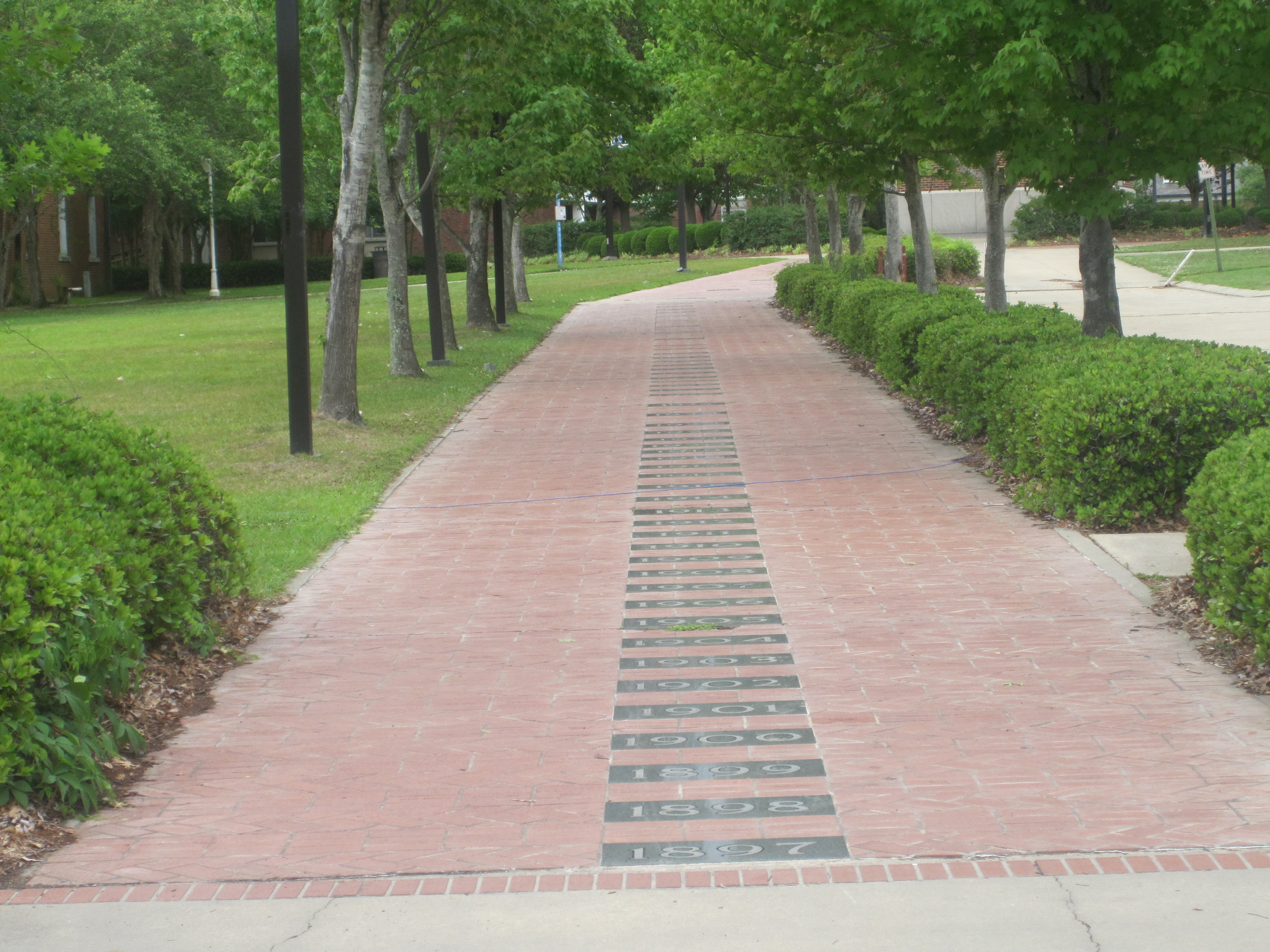
The Brick Alumni Walkway

The alumni walkway was constructed in 1995 as part of the centennial celebration at Louisiana Tech. The brick path stretches from the corner of Adams Boulevard and Dan Reneau Drive through the heart of Centennial Plaza to the footsteps of Tolliver Hall. The alumni brick walkway then follows Wisteria Street north toward Railroad Avenue. The plan is to extend the alumni brick walkway through the University Park student housing apartments that were built near J.C. Love Field. As of March 2022, they have laid down the Bricks of 2020 Alumni.

== Notable people ==
Louisiana Tech has produced prominent businesspeople across several industries. Louisiana Tech alumnus Nick Akins is chief executive officer of Fortune 500 company American Electric Power. Alumnus Glen Post is the former CEO of CenturyLink, and alumnus Michael McCallister is the former CEO of Humana. Edward L. Moyers, former president and CEO of several railroads including MidSouth Rail, Illinois Central Railroad and Southern Pacific Railroad, is a Louisiana Tech graduate. Billionaire businessmen brothers Charles Wyly and Sam Wyly graduated from Louisiana Tech. Founder of Duck Commander and star of A&E's reality television series Duck Dynasty Phil Robertson earned two degrees from Louisiana Tech and also played football for the Bulldogs. Will Wright, designer of some of the best-selling video games of all-time (SimCity, The Sims, and Spore) and co-founder of game development company Maxis, attended Louisiana Tech.

Alumni of Louisiana Tech have also made their mark in the arts, entertainment, and the humanities. Country music superstars Kix Brooks and Trace Adkins are Louisiana Tech alumni along with two-time Grammy Award nominee Wayne Watson. Eddie Gossling, writer and producer for Comedy Central's Tosh.0, attended Louisiana Tech. Alumna Faith Jenkins, winner of the most scholarship money in Miss America pageant history, was the host of the Judge Faith television show, and alumna Sharon Brown is a former Miss USA. Louisiana Tech graduate Marc Swayze is known for creating comic book superheroine Mary Marvel and his work on Captain Marvel.

Louisiana Tech graduates have been influential through public service, higher education, and activism. Former United States Senators James P. Pope and Saxby Chambliss and United States Representatives Newt V. Mills, Joe Waggonner, Jim McCrery, and Rodney Alexander all attended Louisiana Tech. In addition, James P. Pope was director of the Tennessee Valley Authority. Louisiana Tech alumnus Clint Williamson was United States Ambassador-at-Large for War Crimes Issues. Many notable military leaders are Louisiana Tech alumni including lieutenant general David Wade, lieutenant general John Spencer Hardy, major general Susan Y. Desjardins, and major general Jack Ramsaur II. Alumna Kim Gandy was president of the National Organization for Women, and alumnus Jerome Ringo was chairman of the National Wildlife Federation.

Louisiana Tech athletes have starred in the National Football League, National Basketball Association, and Women's National Basketball Association as well as other professional sports. Three Bulldogs have been inducted into the Pro Football Hall of Fame and College Football Hall of Fame: Four-time Super Bowl champion quarterback Terry Bradshaw, four-time Pro Bowl defensive end Fred Dean, and eleven-time Pro Bowl offensive tackle Willie Roaf. Other notable former Bulldog football players include Leo Sanford, Roger Carr, Pat Tilley, Matt Stover, Troy Edwards, Tim Rattay, Tramon Williams, and Ryan Allen. Legendary Lady Techsters coach Leon Barmore; two-time NBA Most Valuable Player Karl Malone; Wade Trophy winner Teresa Weatherspoon; and Kim Mulkey, the only person to have won NCAA Division I national championships as head coach of two different programs (Baylor and LSU), are Louisiana Tech's four inductees into the Naismith Memorial Basketball Hall of Fame. Other notable former Bulldog basketball players include former NBA head coaches Scotty Robertson and Tim Floyd, ABA All-Star Mike Green, NBA champion P. J. Brown, and four-time NBA All-Star Paul Millsap. The Women's Basketball Hall of Fame has inducted seven Louisiana Tech alumni including Barmore, Janice Lawrence Braxton, Mickie DeMoss, Sonja Hogg, Pam Kelly, Mulkey, and Weatherspoon. Other notable former Lady Techsters include Olympic gold medalist Venus Lacy, two-time WNBA All-Star Vickie Johnson, WNBA Finals Most Valuable Player Betty Lennox, and WNBA Rookie of the Year Cheryl Ford. Brandon Gibbs, 2-Time All American Women's Track Finalist.

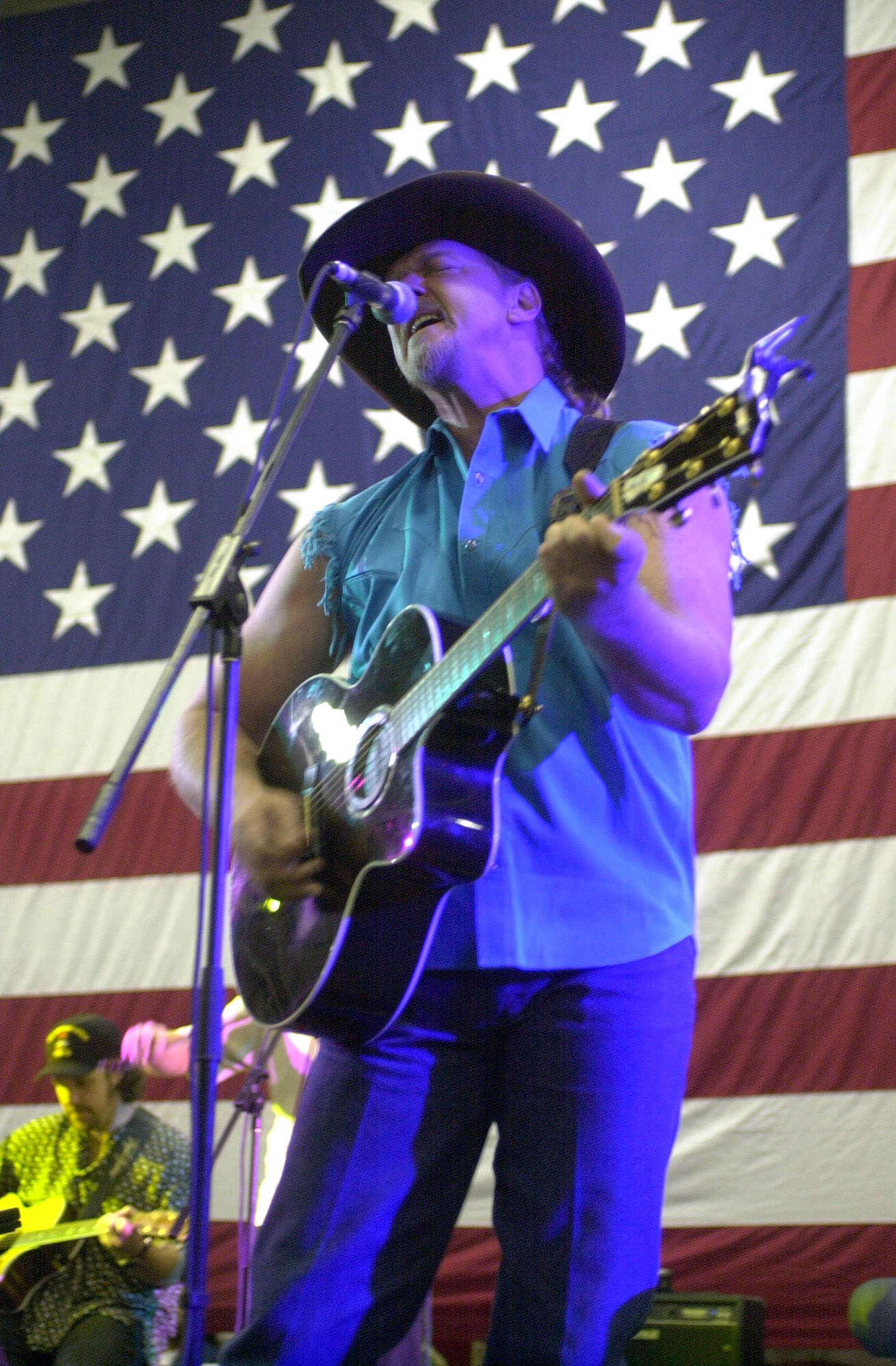
Trace Adkins, recorded three Number One country music hits

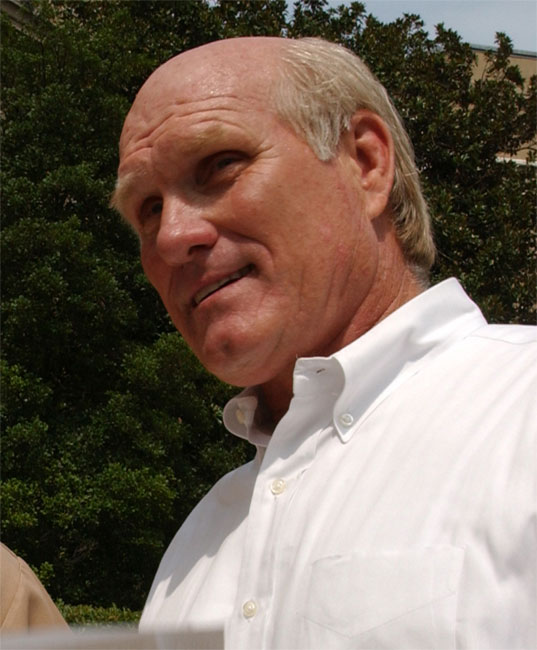
Terry Bradshaw, four-time Super Bowl champion

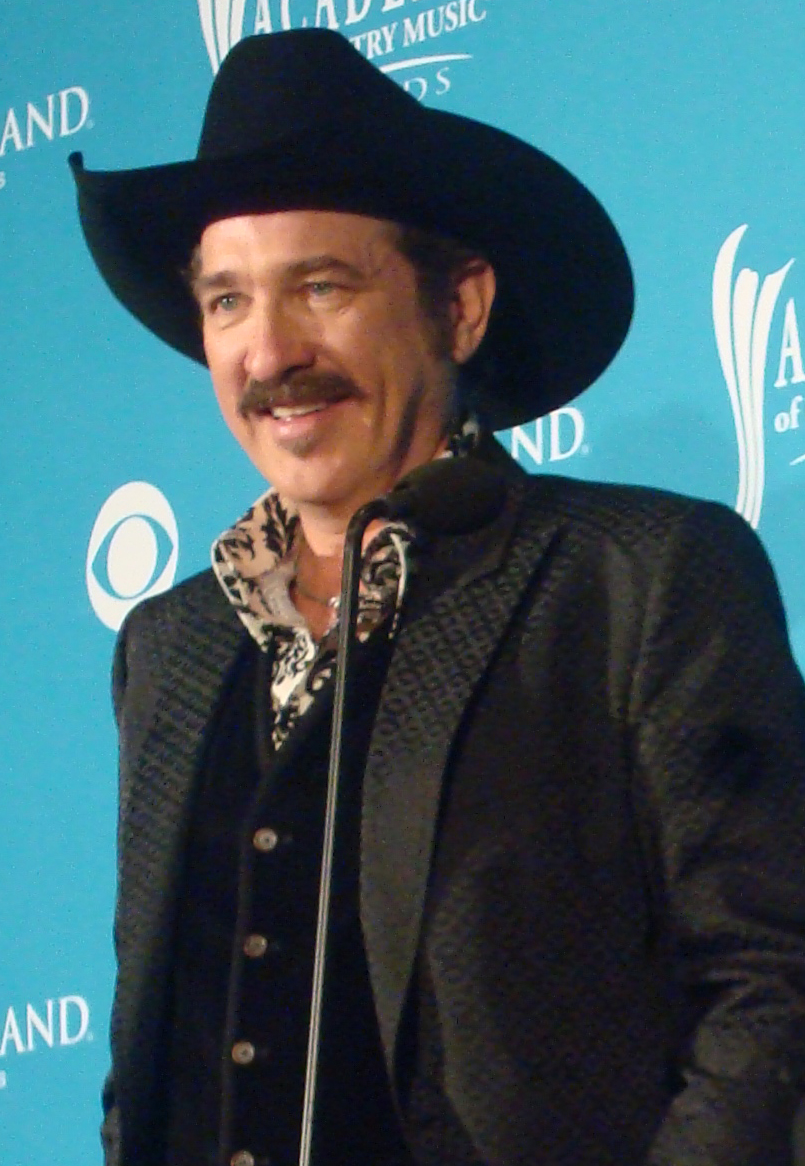
Kix Brooks, won more CMA and ACM awards than any act in country music history

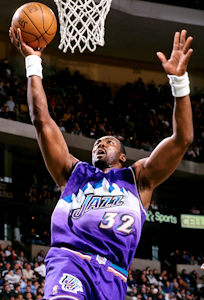
Karl Malone, two-time NBA Most Valuable Player

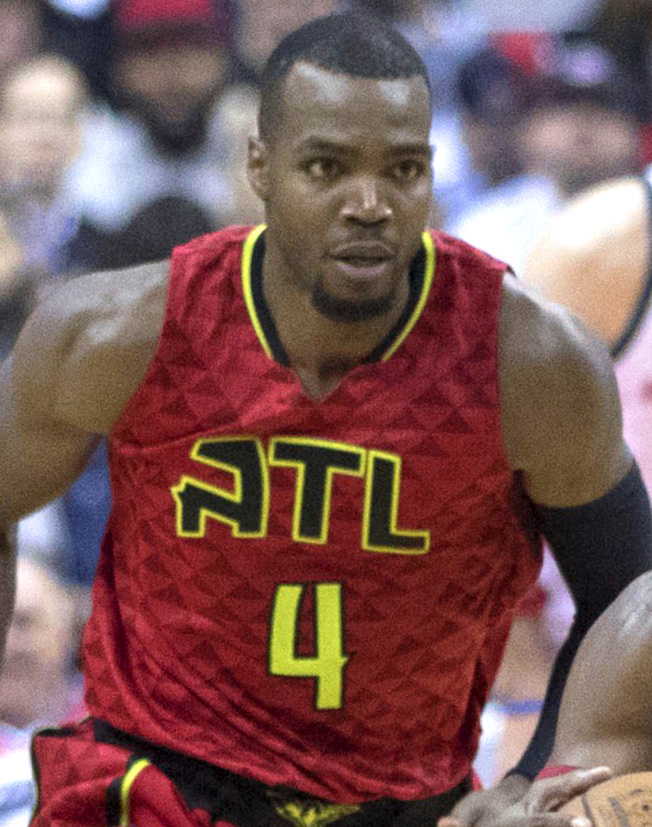
Paul Millsap, four-time NBA All-Star

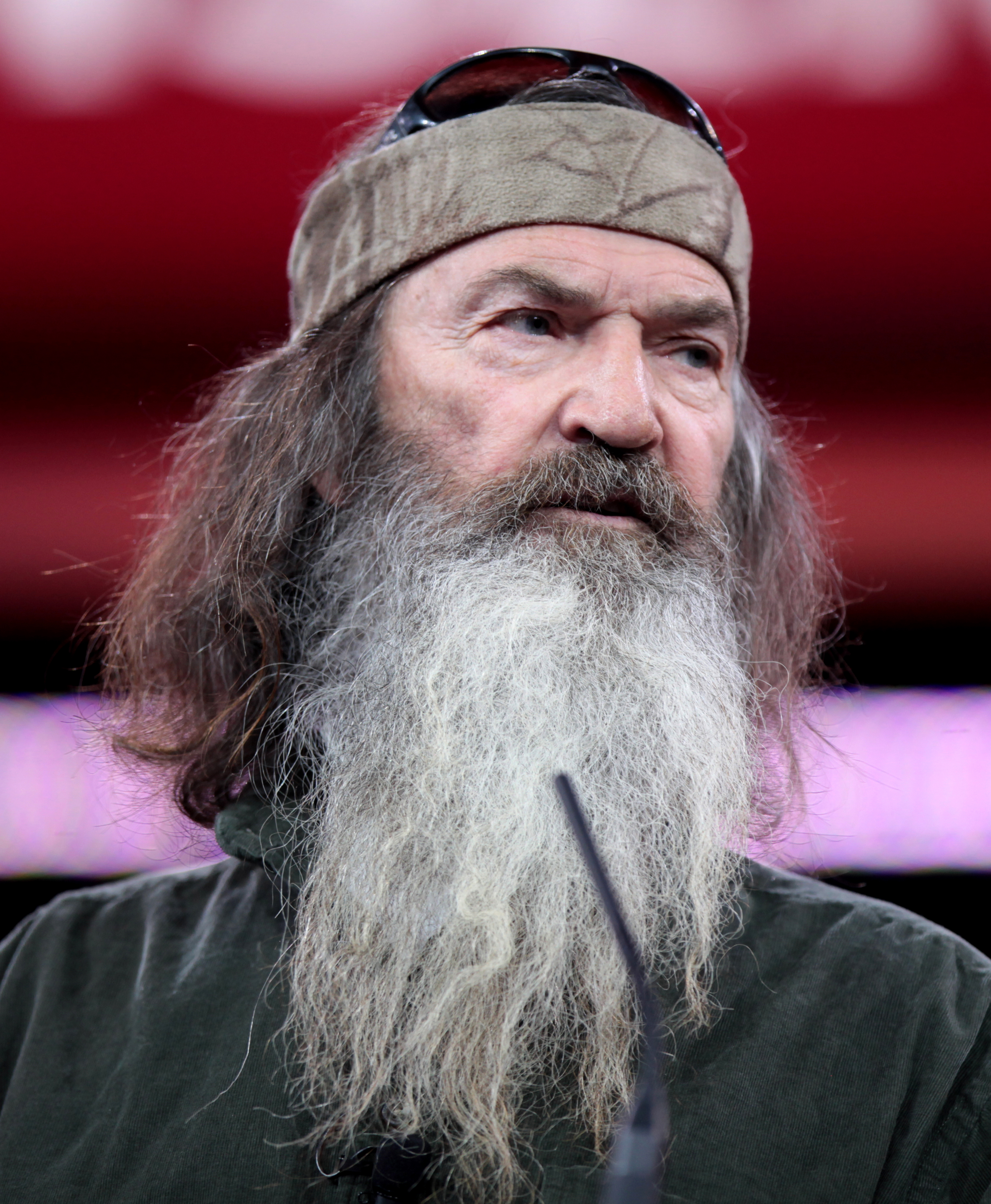
Phil Robertson, founder of Duck Commander, star on television series Duck Dynasty

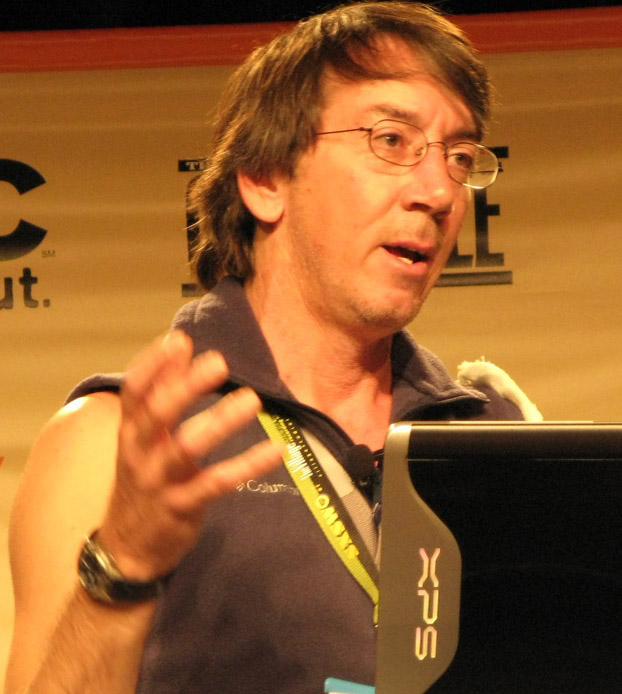
Will Wright, video game designer and creator of The Sims, the best-selling PC game of all time
