= Sandra Woodley =

American academic

8th President of the University of Texas of the Permian Basin
- Incumbent
- Assumed office July 1, 2017
- Preceded by: David Watts

Personal details
- Born: Weaver, Alabama, U.S.
- Education: Auburn University (BA, MBA); Nova Southeastern University (DBA)

Sandra Woodley is an American academic administrator serving as president of the University of Texas of the Permian Basin. She assumed the position when David Watts retired in 2017.

A native of Weaver, Alabama, Woodley received a bachelor's degree and MBA from Auburn University. She then earned a DBA from Nova Southeastern University. She has held administrative positions in Alabama, Arizona, Kentucky, and Texas. Woodley also served as the chief executive officer of the University of Louisiana System.

Woodley officially took office as the 8th president of the University of Texas of the Permian Basin on July 1, 2017.
