= University of Louisiana System =

Public university system in Louisiana

- Motto: For Your Future. For Our Future.
- Type: Public university system
- Established: 1996
- Budget: $906.5 million
- President: Rick Gallot
- Provost: Jeannine O'Rourke
- Students: 91,500 (October 2023)
- Location: Baton Rouge, Louisiana, United States
- Website: www.ulsystem.edu

The University of Louisiana System (UL System) is a public university system in the U.S. state of Louisiana. It enrolls more students than the other three public university systems in the state; as of October 2023, it reported more than 91,500 students throughout its institutions. Its headquarters are in the Claiborne Building in Baton Rouge.

== History ==
The UL System began operating under its new name in 1996, and was founded in 1975 as the Board of Trustees for State Colleges and Universities.

== Member institutions ==
University of Louisiana System Locations.

The University of Louisiana System has eight member institutions:

- Grambling State University main campus
- Louisiana Tech University main campus
- McNeese State University main campus
- Nicholls State University main campus
- Northwestern State University main campus
- Southeastern Louisiana University main campus
- University of Louisiana at Lafayette main campus
- University of Louisiana at Monroe main campus

== Administration ==
The system's president and CEO is Rick Gallot, replacing Jim Henderson in October 2023. Henderson was hired as president in 2016.

=== Past presidents ===
- William "Bill" Junkin (1975–1986, as Executive Director)
- J. Larry Crain (1986–1988)
- David C. McCormick (1989–1991)
- James A. Caillier (1992–1999)
- Carroll Falcon (acting) (1998–1999, 2001)
- Bobby Jindal (1999–2001)
- Sally Clausen (2001–2008)
- Randy Moffett (2008–2012)
- Sandra Woodley (2013–2015).
- Dan Reneau (acting) (2015–2016)
- Jim Henderson (2016–2023)

Crain, Clausen, and Moffett had previously been president of Southeastern Louisiana University. Jindal, a future Louisiana governor, was the youngest president of the University of Louisiana system at age 28.

== Naming conventions ==
In 1999, the University of Southwestern Louisiana became the University of Louisiana at Lafayette and Northeast Louisiana University became the University of Louisiana at Monroe, based on legislation passed in 1995. ULS policy requires both school's abbreviated names to include the municipality, precluding the use of "UL" alone. In 2013, then-president Woodley stated that the policy does not address stand-alone usage of "Louisiana" including within athletics, where usage of particular monikers and acronyms became a point of contention. Soon after, the University of Louisiana at Lafayette's athletic moniker became the "Louisiana Ragin' Cajuns."

== See also ==
- Louisiana State University, the flagship university of Louisiana
- University of Louisiana (disambiguation)
- List of colleges and universities in Louisiana
- Harvey Peltier Jr.
