= List of Louisiana Tech University people =

The following is a list of notable people associated with Louisiana Tech University, in the American city of Ruston, Louisiana.

== Presidents of LTU ==
- Arthur T. Prescott (1895–1899)
- W. C. Robinson (1899–1900)
- James B. Aswell (1900–1904)
- W. E. Taylor (1904–1905)
- C. E. Byrd (1906–1907)
- John E. Keeny (1908–1926)
- John R. Conniff (1927–1928)
- George W. Bond (1929–1936)
- Edwin Richardson (1936–1941)
- Claybrook Cottingham (1941–1949)
- Ralph L. Ropp (1949–1962)
- F. Jay Taylor (1962–1987)
- Dan Reneau (1987–2013)
- Les Guice (2013–2023)
- Jim Henderson (2023–present)

== Academia ==
- George Rollie Adams – president and CEO of The Strong National Museum of Play; acquired National Toy Hall of Fame; established the International Center for the History of Electronic Games, World Video Game Hall of Fame, Brian Sutton-Smith Library and Archives of Play, Woodbury School, and American Journal of Play
- Jenna Carpenter – founding dean and professor of Engineering at Campbell University
- Harvey Cragon – engineer and chair emeritus at the University of Texas at Austin Cockrell School of Engineering
- Charles R. Embry – professor emeritus at Texas A&M
- Woodie Flowers – professor of mechanical engineering at M.I.T.; former host of Scientific American Frontiers
- Les Guice – president of Louisiana Tech University
- J. Barry Mason – former interim president of the University of Alabama; dean of the University of Alabama’s Culverhouse College of Commerce and Business Administration
- Randy Moffett – president of the University of Louisiana System; former President of Southeastern Louisiana University
- R. Byron Pipes – former president of Rensselaer Polytechnic Institute
- Dan Reneau – former president of Louisiana Tech University
- Brett Riley – writer and college professor
- Linda Gilbert Saucier – mathematician, professor, and textbook author
- Dheeraj Sharma – internationally renowned marketing scholar; associate editor of Journal of Marketing Channels; editor of the Academy of Marketing Science Proceedings
- Rohit Srivastava – professor in the Department of Biosciences and Bioegineering at IIT Bombay

== Arts, entertainment, and humanities ==
- Trace Adkins – country music singer; three #1 country music singles; one-time ACM Top New Male Vocalist; one-time CMT Male Video of the Year award
- Jann Aldredge-Clanton – Christian minister, author, teacher, and chaplain
- Hope Anderson – Miss Louisiana 2011
- Leraldo Anzaldua – actor, stunt coordinator, and voice actor
- Elise Baughman – voice actress; former Louisiana Tech cheerleader
- Brady Boyd – pastor
- Kix Brooks – country music singer; host of American Country Countdown; 21 #1 country music singles; two #1 country music singles of the year; one-time CMA Entertainer of the Year; fourteen-time CMA Duo of the Year
- Sharon Brown – Miss USA 1961; Miss Louisiana 1961
- Bill Doss – co-founder of the Elephant Six Collective; member of several bands including Chocolate U.S.A., The Olivia Tremor Control, The Sunshine Fix, and The Apples in Stereo
- Kelly Fearing – artist
- John Ferguson – sportscaster
- Hardy Fox – co-founder of the band The Residents and president of The Cryptic Corporation
- Eddie Gossling – comedian
- Joey Greco – host of the television show Cheaters
- Faith Jenkins – Miss Louisiana 2000, Miss America 2001 first runner-up, attorney and legal analyst
- Merle Kilgore – country music singer
- Bobby Lounge – singer-songwriter
- Qui Nguyen – playwright
- The Residents/Ralph Records – founding members Homer Flynn and Hardy Fox first met at Louisiana Tech
- Phil Robertson – cast member of A&E's Duck Dynasty; inventor of the Duck Commander duck call
- Si Robertson – cast member of A&E's Duck Dynasty
- John Simoneaux – singer, guitarist, songwriter
- Marc Swayze – comic book artist and writer
- Robert Tinney – illustrator
- Rose Venkatesan – talk show host in India
- Muse Watson – actor
- Wayne Watson – Grammy Award-winning singer-songwriter in Contemporary Christian music
- John Corey Whaley – author
- Jamie Wilson – Miss Louisiana 2006

== Business ==
- Nick Akins – president and chief executive officer of American Electric Power
- Stephen Babcock – lawyer
- Martie Cordaro – president and general manager for the Omaha Storm Chasers
- Konstantin Dolgan – entrepreneur
- Cindi Love – executive director and chief operating officer of the Metropolitan Community Church
- Michael McCallister – chairman of the board, president, and CEO of Humana, Inc.
- Edward L. Moyers – president and CEO of several railroads including MidSouth Rail, Illinois Central Railroad and Southern Pacific Railroad
- Ron Ponder – senior information technology executive in several Fortune 100 companies including FedEx, Sprint Nextel, AT&T, Capgemini, and Anthem
- Glen Post – president and CEO of CenturyLink
- John Simonton – founder of PAiA Electronics; publisher of Electronic Musician
- Onega Ulanova – entrepreneur
- Will Wright – co-founder of the game development company Maxis; creator of the Sim City computer game series
- Charles Wyly – entrepreneur and businessman, philanthropist, civic leader, major contributor to Republican causes and Dallas art projects
- Sam Wyly – founder of University Computing Company, Earth Resources Company, Sterling Software, and Maverick Capital; has acquired and is the largest stockholder in several other companies

== Government ==
=== Activism ===
- Kim Gandy – former president of the National Organization for Women
- Jerome Ringo – chairman of the National Wildlife Federation

=== Executive ===
- Sam Caldwell – former mayor of Shreveport
- Lee Cooke (Class of 1966) – former mayor of Austin, Texas (1988–1991), city council member (1977–1981); CEO, Greater Austin Chamber of Commerce (1983–1987)
- Ron Henson – treasurer of Louisiana
- Ibrahima Khalil Kaba – former Guinean minister of Foreign Affairs
- Todd Lamb – current lieutenant governor of Oklahoma
- Jim McBride – Wyoming superintendent of Public Instruction
- W. Fox McKeithen – former secretary of state of Louisiana
- Charles E. Roemer, II – former Louisiana commissioner of administration in the first two administrations of Governor Edwin Washington Edwards
- Clint Williamson – U.S. ambassador-at-large for War Crimes Issues, United Nations envoy, White House policy official

=== Judiciary ===
- E. Joseph Bleich – former Louisiana Supreme Court justice
- Brandon B. Brown – current U.S. attorney for the Western District of Louisiana
- Jeff Cox – judge of the Louisiana 26th Judicial District court in Bossier and Webster parishes since 2005
- Luther F. Cole – state legislator and judge from Baton Rouge; attended Louisiana Tech 1943–1944
- James L. Dennis – judge of the United States Court of Appeals for the Fifth Circuit
- Terry A. Doughty – federal judge
- Robert G. James – federal judge

=== Legislative ===
- Rodney Alexander – former United States representative from Louisiana
- Andy Anders (Class of 1979) – former Louisiana state representative from Concordia Parish
- John Baine – former Arkansas state representative from El Dorado
- Gilbert Baker – Arkansas state senator and candidate for the United States Senate in 2010
- Saxby Chambliss – former United States senator from Georgia; former United States representative from Georgia
- J. Frank Colbert – member of the Louisiana House of Representatives and the mayor of Minden
- E. Leslie Conkling – former Illinois state representative
- Jean M. Doerge – former member of the Louisiana House of Representatives
- R. Harmon Drew, Sr. – former Louisiana state representative from Webster Parish; former Minden city judge
- Harvey Fields – state senator for Union and Morehouse parishes, 1916–1920; member of the Louisiana Public Service Commission, 1927–1936; former law partner and political ally of Huey Pierce Long, Jr.
- Gabe Firment – member of the Louisiana House of Representatives
- John Sidney Garrett – Late Louisiana state representative from Claiborne Parish; former speaker of the Louisiana House of Representatives
- Garret Graves – current United States representative from Louisiana
- Mike Jackson – former president pro tempore of the Texas Senate and acting governor of Texas
- Tim Lemons – civil engineer from Cabot, Arkansas; Republican member of the Arkansas House of Representatives since January 2015
- Luke Letlow – late United States representative from Louisiana
- Jim McCrery – former United States representative from Louisiana
- Newt V. Mills – late United States representative from Louisiana
- Billy Montgomery – former state representative from Bossier Parish
- Danny Roy Moore – former state senator from Claiborne and Bienville parishes
- Tammy Phelps – member of the Louisiana House of Representatives
- James P. Pope – former U.S. senator from Idaho, mayor of Boise, and director of the Tennessee Valley Authority
- Harold Ritchie (attended; did not graduate) – state representative from Washington Parish since 2004
- Phil Short – former Louisiana state senator from St. Tammany Parish
- Joe Waggonner – late United States representative from Louisiana
- Danny Watson – Arkansas state representative
- Ardian Zika – Florida state representative

=== Military ===
- John J. Batbie, Jr. – major general in the U.S. Air Force, served as commander of the United States Air Force Reserve Command
- Susan Y. Desjardins – major general in the U.S. Air Force
- John Spencer Hardy – lieutenant general in the U.S. Air Force; attended Louisiana Tech but graduated from Centenary College of Louisiana
- Campbell B. Hodges – retired United States Army major general
- Jack Ramsaur II – U.S. Air Force major general
- David Wade – lieutenant general in the U.S. Air Force, former commander of Barksdale Air Force Base, state corrections director and adjutant general
- La Vern E. Weber – lieutenant general, former director of the Army National Guard and chief of the National Guard Bureau

== Sports ==
=== Football ===
- Ryan Allen – current NFL punter for the New England Patriots
- Joseph Anderson – former NFL wide receiver for the Chicago Bears
- Larry Anderson – retired NFL cornerback and kick returner for the Pittsburgh Steelers; two-time Super Bowl Champion
- Myron Baker – retired NFL linebacker for the Chicago Bears and Carolina Panthers
- Mike Barber – retired NFL tight end for the Houston Oilers, Los Angeles Rams, and Denver Broncos; founder of Mike Barber Ministries
- Adairius Barnes – retired NFL cornerback for the Detroit Lions
- Houston Bates – current linebacker for the Washington Redskins
- Lloyd Baxter – retired NFL center for the Green Bay Packers
- Taylor Bennett – current quarterback for the Stockholm Mean Machines
- George Benyola – retired NFL kicker for the New York Giants
- Chris Boniol – retired NFL kicker for the Dallas Cowboys, Philadelphia Eagles, and Chicago Bears; one-time Super Bowl champion
- Jim Boudreaux – retired NFL lineman for the Patriots
- Cloyce Box – retired NFL end and halfback; two-time NFL champion; two-time Pro Bowl selection; one-time All-Pro selection
- Craig Bradshaw – retired NFL quarterback for the Houston Oilers
- Terry Bradshaw – retired NFL quarterback for the Pittsburgh Steelers; inducted into the Pro Football Hall of Fame; one-time NFL MVP; four-time Super Bowl champion; two-time Super Bowl MVP; three-time Pro Bowl selection; four-time All-Pro selection; Bert Bell Award; 1970s All-Decade Team; #1 overall NFL draft selection
- Kentrell Brice – current NFL safety for the Green Bay Packers
- Matt Broha – former NFL defensive end for the New York Giants
- Eddie Brown – former AFL offensive specialist for the Albany/Indiana Firebirds; voted best player in arena football history in 2006
- Weldon Brown – current CFL cornerback for the Edmonton Eskimos
- Bob Brunet – retired NFL running back for the Washington Redskins
- Vernon Butler – first round NFL draft pick; current NFL defensive tackle for the Carolina Panthers
- Colby Cameron – current NFL quarterback for the Carolina Panthers
- Roger Carr – retired NFL wide receiver for the Baltimore Colts; one-time Pro Bowl selection
- Zac Champion – current CFL quarterback for the Calgary Stampeders; former CFL quarterback for the BC Lions
- Jessie Clark – retired NFL running back for the Green Bay Packers, Detroit Lions, Arizona Cardinals, and Minnesota Vikings
- Pat Collins – former Louisiana-Monroe head football coach
- Ryan Considine – current UFL offensive tackle for the Las Vegas Locomotives
- Fred Dean – retired NFL defensive end for the San Diego Chargers and San Francisco 49ers; inducted into the Pro Football Hall of Fame; two-time Super Bowl champion
- Mark Dillard – former safety for the New England Patriots
- Kenneth Dixon – current NFL running back for the Baltimore Ravens
- George Doherty – retired NFL lineman and former head football coach at Northwestern State
- Vontarrius Dora – current NFL linebacker for the Denver Broncos
- Derrick Douglas – retired NFL running back for the Tampa Bay Buccaneers and Cleveland Browns
- Jeff Driskel – current NFL Quarterback for the Cincinnati Bengals
- Matt Dunigan – retired CFL quarterback for the Edmonton Eskimos, BC Lions, Toronto Argonauts, Winnipeg Blue Bombers, Birmingham Barracudas, and Hamilton Tiger-Cats; inducted into Canadian Football Hall of Fame; two-time Grey Cup champion; Tom Pate Memorial Award; Jeff Russel Memorial Trophy; Voted one of CFL's Top 50 players; holds pro football record for most passing yards in one game (713)
- Denny Duron – national championship quarterback at Louisiana Tech
- Troy Edwards – retired NFL wide receiver for the Pittsburgh Steelers, St. Louis Rams, Jacksonville Jaguars, and Detroit Lions; current AFL wide receiver for the Grand Rapids Rampage; holds the NCAA record for most receiving yards in one game (405 vs. Nebraska)
- Justin Ellis – current NFL defensive tackle for the Oakland Raiders
- IK Enemkpali – current NFL defensive end for the New York Jets
- Hiram Eugene – current NFL safety for the Oakland Raiders
- Doug Evans – retired NFL cornerback and safety for the Green Bay Packers, Carolina Panthers, Seattle Seahawks, and Detroit Lions; one-time Super Bowl champion
- Jaylon Ferguson – Louisiana Tech and Conference USA all-time leader in sacks
- Bobby Gray – retired NFL safety for the Chicago Bears
- Garland Gregory – former AAFC guard/linebacker for the San Francisco 49ers
- Roland Harper – retired NFL running back for the Chicago Bears
- Carlos Henderson – current wide receiver for the Bulldogs
- Tom Hinton – retired CFL guard for the BC Lions; inducted into the Canadian Football Hall of Fame; one-time Grey Cup Champion
- Johnathan Holland – current NFL wide receiver for the Oakland Raiders; winner of ESPN's Pontiac Game Changing Performance for his spectacular catch against Nebraska
- Ray Holley – current CFL running back
- Sam Hughes – former arena football quarterback
- Gene Johnson – former AFL quarterback
- Walter Johnson – former NFL linebacker
- James Jordan – former NFL wide receiver for the San Francisco 49ers
- Trey Junkin – retired NFL tight end and long snapper for the Buffalo Bills, Washington Redskins, Los Angeles Raiders, Seattle Seahawks, Oakland Raiders, Arizona Cardinals, and New York Giants
- Austin Kendall – former Louisiana Tech quarterback
- David Lee – retired NFL punter for the Baltimore Colts
- Phillip Livas – NCAA record holder for most kickoff and punt returns for touchdowns
- Caleb Martin – NFL champion for the Chicago Cardinals
- Jason Martin – retired quarterback in NFL Europe and arena football
- Luke McCown – current NFL quarterback for the New Orleans Saints; former NFL quarterback for the Jacksonville Jaguars, Cleveland Browns, and Tampa Bay Buccaneers
- Pete McCulley – former head coach of the San Francisco 49ers
- Kevin McGiven – offensive coordinator at San Jose State, Oregon State, and Utah State
- Jordan Mills – current NFL offensive tackle for the Chicago Bears
- Ryan Moats – current NFL running back for the Minnesota Vikings; former running back for the Philadelphia Eagles, Arizona Cardinals, and Houston Texans
- Dennis Morris – current tight end for the St. Louis Rams; 2009 NCAA Tight End of the Year
- Eldonta Osborne – retired NFL linebacker for the Cardinals
- Quinton Patton – current wide receiver for Louisiana Tech
- Joe Raymond Peace – former Louisiana Tech head football coach
- Tim Rattay – current UFL quarterback for the Las Vegas Locomotive; former NFL quarterback for the San Francisco 49ers, Tampa Bay Buccaneers, Tennessee Titans, and Arizona Cardinals
- Mike Richardson – retired CFL running back for the Winnipeg Blue Bombers and Ottawa Rough Riders; 1992 CFL Most Outstanding Rookie
- Willie Roaf – retired NFL offensive tackle for the New Orleans Saints and Kansas City Chiefs; eleven-time Pro Bowl selection; ten-time All-Pro selection; NFL 1990s All-Decade Team; inducted into New Orleans Saints Hall of Fame; inducted into Arkansas Sports Hall of Fame
- Amik Robertson – current NFL cornerback for the Detroit Lions
- Johnny Robinson – retired NFL defensive end for the Los Angeles Raiders and Oakland Raiders; one-time Super Bowl champion
- Moqut Ruffins – football player
- Billy Ryckman – retired NFL wide receiver for the Atlanta Falcons
- Glenell Sanders – retired NFL linebacker for the Bears, Rams, Broncos, and Colts
- Leo Sanford – retired NFL linebacker for the Chicago Cardinals and Baltimore Colts; two-time Pro Bowl selection
- Josh Scobee – retired NFL kicker for the Jacksonville Jaguars
- Boston Scott – current NFL running back for the New Orleans Saints
- Eric Shaw – retired NFL defensive end for the Cincinnati Bengals
- John Simon – former NFL running back for the Tennessee Titans and Washington Redskins
- Mickey Slaughter – retired NFL quarterback for the Denver Broncos
- Artie Smith – retired NFL defensive end for the Cincinnati Bengals, San Francisco 49ers, and Dallas Cowboys
- D'Anthony Smith – current defensive tackle for the Jacksonville Jaguars
- J'Mar Smith – current USFL quarterback for the Birmingham Stallions
- Joe Smith – current CFL running back for the Winnipeg Blue Bombers; former NFL running back for the Jacksonville Jaguars, Tampa Bay Buccaneers, and Tennessee Titans; former NFL Europe running back for the Rhein Fire; former CFL running back for the BC Lions; Eddie James Memorial Trophy; one-time CFL All-Star selection
- L'Jarius Sneed – current NFL cornerback for the Kansas City Chiefs
- Tommy Spinks – retired NFL wide receiver for the Minnesota Vikings
- Quincy Stewart – former NFL player for the San Francisco 49ers and New York Jets; CFL Grey Cup Champion
- Matt Stover – former NFL kicker for the Baltimore Ravens and Cleveland Browns; one-time All-Conference selection; one-time Super Bowl champion; one-time Pro Bowl selection; one-time Pro Bowl alternate
- Trent Taylor – current wide receiver for the Cincinnati Bengals
- Pat Tilley – retired NFL wide receiver for the St. Louis Cardinals; one-time Pro Bowl selection
- Paul Turner – current NFL wide receiver for the Philadelphia Eagles
- Josh Victorian – current NFL cornerback for the Pittsburgh Steelers
- John Henry White – retired CFL running back for the BC Lions; one-time Grey Cup Champion
- Myles White – current NFL wide receiver for the Green Bay Packers
- A.L. Williams – former Louisiana Tech head football coach
- Grant Williams – retired NFL offensive tackle for the Seattle Seahawks, New England Patriots, and St. Louis Rams; one-time Super Bowl champion
- Milton Williams – current NFL defensive tackle for the Philadelphia Eagles
- Tramon Williams – current NFL cornerback for the Green Bay Packers
- J. R. Williamson – former NFL linebacker for the Oakland Raiders and Boston Patriots
- Jerron Wishom – former NFL cornerback for the Green Bay Packers
- Xavier Woods – current NFL safety for the Dallas Cowboys
- Andre Young – former NFL defensive back for the San Diego Chargers
- Zack T. Young – former Louisiana Tech quarterback and coach

=== Bulldog basketball ===
- Raheem Appleby – professional basketball player in Europe
- Olu Ashaolu – former professional basketball player in Spain, France, and Japan
- Leon Barmore (born 1944) – retired head coach for the Lady Techsters; best coaching winning percentage in women's basketball history; member of Basketball Hall of Fame; member of the Women's Basketball Hall of Fame; one-time national champion
- Jacobi Boykins – professional basketball player in Europe
- P.J. Brown – former NBA power forward for the New Jersey Nets, Miami Heat, Charlotte/New Orleans Hornets, Chicago Bulls, and Boston Celtics; one-time NBA champion; three-time NBA All-Defensive Second Team; one-time NBA Sportsmanship Award; one-time J. Walter Kennedy Citizenship Award; inducted into the Louisiana Basketball Hall of Fame
- Anthony Duruji – professional basketball player in NBA G League
- Tommy Joe Eagles – retired head basketball coach at Louisiana Tech, Auburn, and New Orleans
- Marcus Elliott – former professional basketball player in Europe
- Ron Ellis – drafted by Phoenix Suns; played in CBA
- Lavelle Felton – former European professional basketball player
- Tim Floyd – former NCAA head basketball coach at UTEP; former NBA head basketball coach of the Chicago Bulls and New Orleans Hornets; former NCAA head basketball coach at Iowa State, Idaho, USC, and New Orleans
- Trevor Gaskins – professional basketball player
- Kyle Gibson – former professional basketball player
- Stojan Gjuroski – member of the Macedonian national basketball team
- Mike Green – retired NBA center for the Seattle SuperSonics, San Antonio Spurs, and Kansas City Kings; retired ABA center for the Denver Nuggets, Denver Rockets, and Virginia Squires; one-time ABA All-Star selection
- Alex Hamilton – 2016 Conference USA Player of the Year; player for Hapoel Eilat in the Israeli Basketball Premier League
- Jalen Harris – professional basketball player
- Gerrod Henderson – former European basketball shooting guard for Panionios, Hemofarm, Crvena zvezda, Anwil Włocławek, and Azovmash Mariupol
- Mohammed Ibrahim – former basketball player for the Lebanese national team
- Jaron Johnson – professional basketball player in the Washington Wizards organization
- Kyle Keller – head basketball coach at Stephen F. Austin
- Victor King – retired professional basketball player
- Michale Kyser (born 1991) – basketball player for Hapoel Holon in the Israeli Basketball Premier League
- Dwayne Lathan – played in the NBA D-League
- Kenneth Lofton Jr. – power forward/center for Hapoel Jerusalem in the Israeli Basketball Premier League, and for the NBA's Memphis Grizzlies
- Karl Malone (born 1963) – retired NBA power forward for the Utah Jazz and Los Angeles Lakers; two-time NBA MVP; Thirteen-time NBA All-Star; Eleven-time All-NBA First Team; two-time All-NBA Second Team; one-time All-NBA Third Team; three-time NBA All-Defensive First Team; one-time NBA All-Defensive Second Team; NBA All-Rookie Team; two-time NBA All-Star Game MVP; NBA's 50th Anniversary All-Time Team; two-time Olympic gold medalist; second leading scorer in NBA history
- Mike McConathy – former head coach at Northwestern State
- Erik McCree – current professional basketball player
- Kenyon McNeail – professional basketball player in Europe and Australia
- Antonio Meeking – played in the NBA D-League and professionally overseas
- Paul Millsap (born 1985) – former NBA power forward for the Brooklyn Nets; NBA All-Rookie Second Team; three-time NCAA rebounding champion
- Jackie Moreland – retired NBA player for the Detroit Pistons and New Orleans Buccaneers; inducted into the Louisiana Basketball Hall of Fame
- Rich Peek – retired NBA and ABA basketball player
- Scotty Robertson – former NBA head coach for the New Orleans Jazz, Chicago Bulls, and Detroit Pistons; Louisiana Tech Bulldogs basketball coach, 1964–1974
- Magnum Rolle – former NBA center for the Indiana Pacers
- Dave Simmons –former head coach at McNeese State
- Speedy Smith (born 1993) – basketball player for Hapoel Jerusalem of the Israeli Basketball Premier League, 2015 Conference USA Player of the Year
- Randy White – retired NBA power forward for the Dallas Mavericks
- Jim Wooldridge – former NCAA basketball head coach at UC Riverside; former head coach at Central Missouri State, Texas State, Louisiana Tech, and Kansas State

=== Lady Techster basketball ===
- Janice Lawrence Braxton – retired WNBA player for the Cleveland Rockers; inducted into Women's Basketball Hall of Fame; one-time Olympic gold medalist; Wade Trophy winner
- Alisa Burras – retired WNBA center for the Cleveland Rockers, Portland Fire, and Seattle Storm
- Mickie DeMoss – former NCAA head women's basketball coach at Kentucky and Florida; one-time SEC Coach of the Year
- Shanavia Dowdell – drafted in 2010 WNBA draft
- Cheryl Ford – current WNBA power forward for the Detroit Shock; three-time WNBA champion; WNBA Rookie of the Year; one-time WNBA All-Star game MVP; one-time Olympic bronze medalist
- Sonja Hogg – former Louisiana Tech physical education professor, Lady Techsters basketball coach, and Baylor Lady Bears basketball coach; inducted into Women's Basketball Hall of Fame
- Tamicha Jackson – All-American; 7-year career in the WNBA
- Vickie Johnson – retired WNBA shooting guard for the New York Liberty and San Antonio Silver Stars; two-time WNBA All-Star; Eighth leading scorer in WNBA history
- Janet Karvonen – inducted into National High School Sports Hall of Fame, Minnesota High School Sports Hall of Fame, and Minnesota Coaches Hall of Fame
- Pam Kelly – Wade Trophy winner; three-time All-American
- Venus Lacy – retired WNBA center for the New York Liberty; one-time USA Basketball Female Athlete of the Year; one-time Olympic gold medalist
- Angela Lawson – head women's basketball coach at the University of the Incarnate Word
- Betty Lennox – current WNBA guard for the Atlanta Dream; former WNBA guard for the Minnesota Lynx, Miami Sol, Cleveland Rockers, and Seattle Storm; WNBA Rookie of the Year; one-time WNBA champion; one-time WNBA Finals MVP
- Monica Maxwell – retired WNBA small forward for the Washington Mystics and Indiana Fever
- Kim Mulkey (class of 1984) – current head women's basketball coach at LSU Tigers women's basketball team (2021–present),and Former head women's basketball coach at Baylor Bears women's basketball (2000–2021); one-time Frances Pomeroy Naismith Award; one-time Olympic gold medalist; inducted into women's basketball Hall of Fame; only female to win NCAA title as a player (Louisiana Tech) and a coach (Baylor), and a coach (LSU).
- Christie Sides – former head coach of WNBA's Indiana Fever
- LaQuan Stallworth – former professional basketball player
- Brooke Stoehr – co-head coach of Northwestern State women's basketball
- Ayana Walker – retired WNBA forward for the Detroit Shock and Charlotte Sting; one-time WNBA champion
- Teresa Weatherspoon – current head coach for the Lady Techsters; retired WNBA point guard for the New York Liberty and Los Angeles Sparks; two-time WNBA Defensive Player of the Year; WNBA second all-time assists leader; four-time WNBA All-Star starter; one-time Olympic gold medalist; one-time Olympic bronze medalist; Wade Trophy winner
- Jennifer White – head women's basketball coach at St. Edward's University
- Debra Williams – retired WNBA player for the Charlotte Sting

=== Baseball ===
- Jeff Albert – MLB hitting coach for the Astros, Cardinals, and Mets
- Bill Bagwell – MLB left fielder for the Braves and Athletics
- Harley Boss – MLB first baseman for the Washington Senators and Cleveland Indians; former head baseball coach at Vanderbilt (deceased)
- Jim Case – current head baseball coach at Jacksonville State
- Phil Diehl – MLB pitcher for the Rockies
- Atley Donald – MLB pitcher for the New York Yankees; one-time World Series champion; two-time American League champion (deceased)
- Mark Doubleday – Olympic baseball player
- Chuck Finley – retired MLB pitcher for the California/Anaheim Angles, Cleveland Indians, and St. Louis Cardinals; five-time All-Star
- Tom Herrin – MLB pitcher for the Boston Red Sox (deceased)
- Phil Hiatt – retired MLB utility player for the Kansas City Royals, Detroit Tigers, and Los Angeles Dodgers
- Rick Huckabay – former men's basketball head coach for Marshall University
- Mike Jeffcoat – retired MLB pitcher for the Cleveland Indians, San Francisco Giants, Texas Rangers, and Florida Marlins
- Bob Linton – former MLB catcher for the Pittsburgh Pirates
- Phil Maton – current MLB pitcher for the Houston Astros
- Kevin McGehee – former MLB pitcher for the Baltimore Orioles
- Randy McGilberry – retired MLB pitcher for the Kansas City Royals
- Charlie Montoyo – current manager for the Toronto Blue Jays; former MLB player for the Montreal Expos
- Brian Myrow – current Minor League first baseman in the San Diego Padres organization; former MLB first baseman for the Los Angeles Dodgers
- Rebel Oakes – MLB center fielder for the Cincinnati Reds, St. Louis Cardinals, and Pittsburgh Rebels (deceased)
- Pat Patterson – winningest college baseball coach in Louisiana sports history; Seven-time conference Coach of the Year (deceased)
- Jeff Richardson – retired MLB infielder for the Cincinnati Reds, Pittsburgh Pirates, and Boston Red Sox
- David Segui – retired MLB first baseman for the Baltimore Orioles, New York Mets, Montreal Expos, Seattle Mariners, Toronto Blue Jays, Texas Rangers, and Cleveland Indians
- Dave Short – retired MLB outfielder for the Chicago White Sox
- George Stone – retired MLB pitcher for the New York Mets and Atlanta Braves

=== Track and field ===
- Ayanna Alexander – Olympian triple jumper
- Chelsea Hayes – Olympian long jumper
- Olivia McKoy – Olympian javelin thrower
- Jason Morgan – Olympian discus thrower

=== Soccer ===
- Nomvula Kgoale – South African national team soccer player
- Donya Salomon-Ali – Haitian national team soccer player

=== Horse racing ===
- J. Keith Desormeaux – horse trainer of 2016 Preakness Stakes winner Exaggerator

== Notable Louisiana Tech faculty ==
- David M. Anderson – historian
- Elenora A. Cawthon – former dean
- Tabbetha Dobbins – physicist and an associate professor of Physics & Astronomy
- Patricia A. Edwards – professor, author, and member of the Reading Hall of Fame
- Lee Hedges – football coach
- R. Anthony Inman – academic
- Rodney L. Lowman – psychologist
- Yuri Lvov – research scientist and professor of chemistry; 2007 Small Times National Innovator of the Year
- E. Wilson Lyon – former president of Pomona College
- Margaret Maxfield – mathematician and mathematics book author
- Garnie W. McGinty – historian, 1930s–1960s
- Virgil Orr – chemical engineering professor, Tech dean, and then vice president (1952–1980); state representative, 1988–1992
- Reginald Owens – journalist
- Jason Pigg – political scientist
- Vir Phoha – professor of electrical engineering and computer science
- Ellis Sandoz – director of the Eric Voegelin Institute for American Renaissance Studies
- William Y. Thompson – historian
- Stephen Webre – historian
- John D. Winters – historian (1948–1984)
