= List of botanical gardens and arboretums in Louisiana =

This list of botanical gardens and arboretums in Louisiana is intended to include all significant botanical gardens and arboretums in the U.S. state of Louisiana

Name	Image	Affiliation	City
Biedenharn Museum and Gardens			Monroe
Laurens Henry Cohn Sr. Memorial Plant Arboretum			Baton Rouge
The Gardens of the American Rose Center			Shreveport
Hodges Gardens State Park			Many
Independence Park Botanic Gardens			Baton Rouge
Jungle Gardens			Avery Island
Longue Vue House and Gardens			New Orleans
Louisiana State Arboretum			Ville Platte
Louisiana Tech University Arboretum		Louisiana Tech University	Ruston
LSU AgCenter Botanic Gardens		Louisiana State University	Baton Rouge
LSU Hilltop Arboretum		Louisiana State University	Baton Rouge
New Orleans Botanical Garden			New Orleans

== See also ==
- List of botanical gardens and arboretums in the United States
