= John R. Conniff =

American educator and college president (1874–1957)

John Robinson Conniff, Sr.

7th President of Louisiana Tech University
- In office 1926 – May 18, 1928
- Preceded by: John Keeny
- Succeeded by: George W. Bond

Personal details
- Born: January 20, 1874 New Orleans, Louisiana, USA
- Died: January 20, 1957 (aged 83) New Orleans, Louisiana
- Resting place: Garden of Memories in Metairie, Louisiana
- Party: Democratic
- Spouse: Bertha Drott Conniff (married 1905-1957, his death)
- Children: John Conniff, Jr.
- Parent(s): John Harris and Mary Orleana Robinson Conniff
- Education: Tulane University University of Virginia Louisiana State University
- Occupation: Educator; College president

John Robinson Conniff, Sr. (January 20, 1874 – January 20, 1957) was an educator from New Orleans, Louisiana, who served from 1926 to 1928 as the seventh president of Louisiana Tech University in Ruston in Lincoln Parish in North Louisiana.

== Background ==
Conniff was the oldest of five children born in New Orleans to the former Mary Orleana Robinson (1850-1917), whose family tree is traced to a family in colonial Delaware, and John Harris Conniff (1850-1909), the president of the Crescent News and Hotel Company with interests also in the New Orleans entertainment industry—the St. Charles Theatre, the Academy of Music, and the Grand Opera House. The senior Coniffs are interred at Greenwood Cemetery in New Orleans.

Young Coniff graduated in 1890 from the high school of Roman Catholic-affiliated Tulane University. In 1894, he received a Bachelor of Arts degree from Tulane, where he became affiliated with Phi Delta Theta fraternity. Conniff then studied law for a year at the University of Virginia in Charlottesville, Virginia.

== Academic career ==
From 1895 to 1900, Conniff taught English and Latin at Boys' High School in New Orleans; from 1900 to 1908, he was assistant superintendent of New Orleans public schools and from 1908 to 1910 the acting superintendent. In 1910, he moved to Baton Rouge to head the teacher certification division of the Louisiana Department of Education under superintendent T. H. Harris.

Conniff was a devotee of physical education and was the president of the first Tulane Baseball League and the Southern Athletic Club of New Orleans. In 1905, he helped to establish the Public School Athletic League of New Orleans and served as its long-term secretary. Considering his father's ownership of entertainment enterprises, Conniff participated in theatrical performances in New Orleans and Baton Rouge, where he helped to create the Little Theatre Guild. In 1923, while working at the state education department, Conniff received his Master of Arts degree from Louisiana State University in Baton Rouge. His thesis entails a study of English drama and theatrical performances prior to 1642.

Like his father, Conniff was an active Democrat and a member of the National Education Association and the former white-only Louisiana Teachers Association, since the biracial Louisiana Association of Educators. He was a member of the Baton Rouge Golf and Country Club. Conniff relocated from Baton Rouge to Ruston in 1926 to become the president of Louisiana Tech, having succeeded John Ephraim Keeny, who stepped down after eighteen years at the helm.

On leaving Louisiana Tech after two years at the helm, Conniff returned to New Orleans, where he joined the faculty of the all-male Warren Easton High School, now a charter school. At Warren Easton, Conniff resumed his teaching of English and Latin. During summers he taught the History of Louisiana at his alma mater, Tulane University.

== Death ==
Conniff and his wife, the former Bertha Drott (1882-1971), had one son, John R. Conniff, Jr. (1906-1968). Conniff died on his 83rd birthday, also the day of the second inauguration of U.S. President Dwight D. Eisenhower. The couple is interred at Garden of Memories in Metairie in Jefferson Parish in suburban New Orleans. John Coniff, Jr., however, is interred at St. Louis Cemetery No. 3 in New Orleans.

Preceded by John Keeny	7th President of Louisiana Tech University in Ruston, Louisiana John Robinson Conniff, Sr. 1926–1928	Succeeded by George W. Bond
