= Clarence Faulk =

American journalist

Clarence Eugene Faulk, Jr.
- Fauln election as president of the Louisiana Press Association (1950)
- Born: January 9, 1909; West Monroe, Ouachita Parish; Louisiana, USA
- Died: March 5, 2010 (aged 101); Ruston, Lincoln Parish; Louisiana
- Resting place: Greenwood Cemetery in Ruston
- Education: University of the South; University of Missouri School of Journalism
- Spouse: Louise Benson Page Faulk (married 1931-2003, her death)
- Children: Clarence Faulk, III W. Page Faulk Amelia Faulk Rauser
- Parent(s): Clarence Faulk, Sr. Josephine McClendon Faulk

Clarence Eugene Faulk, Jr. (January 9, 1909 – March 5, 2010), was an American journalist who published from 1931 to 1962 the Ruston Daily Leader, the daily newspaper in Ruston in north Louisiana. Through the ownership of KRUS-AM radio, Faulk was a broadcaster. He was also engaged in real estate and a pioneer of self-storage warehousing, a business that he did not launch until after he was seventy years of age.

== Biography ==
Faulk was born in West Monroe in Ouachita Parish, Louisiana, to C. E. Faulk, Sr. (1878–1951), and the former Josephine McClendon (1882–1962). Clarence Faulk, Sr. published the Monroe News Star in Monroe, Louisiana, and was a founder and the president from 1934 to 1945 of Delta Air Lines. He was chairman of the Delta board from 1948 until his death in 1951.

After two years at the University of the South in Sewanee, Tennessee, Faulk transferred to the School of Journalism at the University of Missouri in Columbia, Missouri, where he met Louise Benson Page, herself a journalism student. The couple married in 1931. Faulk was publisher of the Ruston Daily Leader for thirty-one years until he sold the newspaper in 1962. In 1947, Faulk established KRUS, which he managed until 1968. For many years, he was the president of the Louisiana Press Association and the Louisiana Broadcasters Association.

Faulk was classified 4-F during World War II because of severe eye problems, Faulk nevertheless became a first lieutenant in the Home Guard. He was a member of the federal wartime Office of Price Administration, often called the "rationing board". He was the chairman of the Ruston area savings bond drive.

The Faulks had three children, Clarence Eugene "Gene" Faulk III, Dr. W. Page Faulk, and Amelia Faulk Rauser, ten grandchildren, and seven great-grandchildren.
