= W. C. Robinson (educator) =

William Claiborne "W. C." Robinson
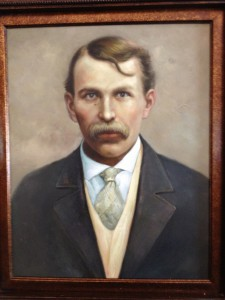
- Robinson, circa 1900

2nd President of Louisiana Tech University
- In office 1899–1900
- Preceded by: Arthur T. Prescott
- Succeeded by: James B. Aswell

Personal details
- Born: April 25, 1861 Stony Creek, Virginia, U.S.
- Died: April 1, 1914 (aged 52)
- Resting place: Mt. Lebanon Cemetery near Gibsland, Louisiana, U.S.
- Spouse: Etta A. Robinson
- Children: Two, died in infancy: Hunt Vaughn Robinson; Ealvise Conner Robinson; Six, survived to adulthood: Herbert Lynn Robinson; Fred B. Robinson; Esther Robinson; Virginia Robinson; Robert Hicks Robinson; Luther William Robinson
- Occupation: Educator; College president

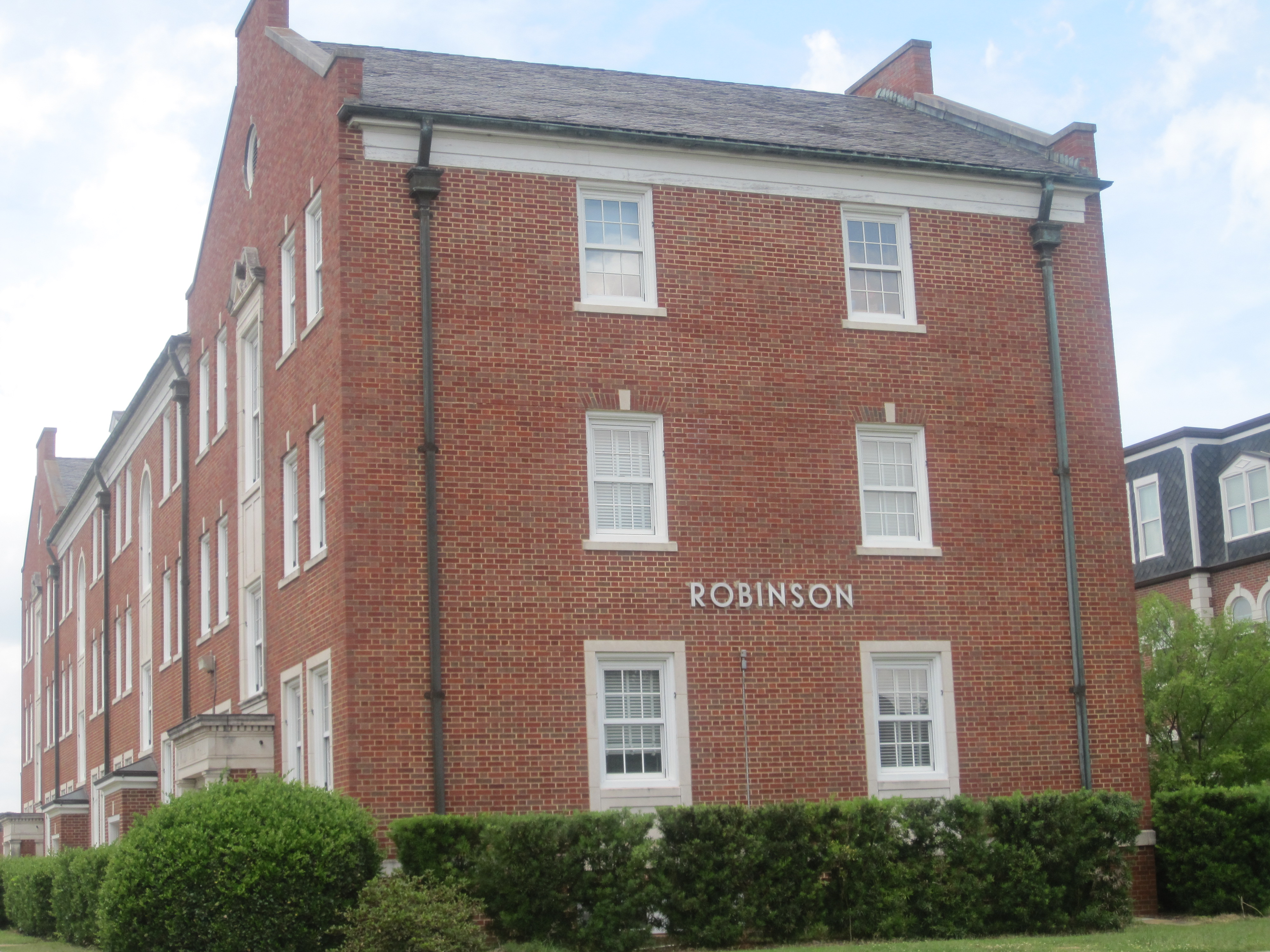
Historic Robinson Hall at Louisiana Tech University is named for Robinson.

William Claiborne Robinson, known as W. C. Robinson (April 25, 1861 – April 1, 1914), was a mathematics professor paid $800 per year who was elevated for one year, 1889 to 1900, as the second president of Louisiana Tech University in Ruston, Louisiana.

Robinson began teaching at Louisiana Tech when the institution consisted of one building with eight classrooms, a science laboratory, an auditorium, two offices, and a small frame building which served as a workshop. One of the offices was used as a reading room, the modest forerunner of Prescott Memorial Library, named for the first college president, Arthur T. Prescott, who provided the original reading materials at his own expense.

In 1900, Robinson resigned as president to return to the classroom. He was succeeded by the English professor James B. Aswell, later a state superintendent of education, president of Northwestern State University in Natchitoches, Louisiana, and a member of the United States House of Representatives.

Little is known of Robinson himself, but much attention has been placed on the campus building, Robinson Hall, named in his honor. Constructed in 1939, twenty-five years after Robinson's death, the building was originally a men's dormitory which had fallen into disrepair by the middle 1960s. With a refurbished interior but with the exterior still unaltered and easily identified by former alumni, Robinson Hall is the home of the Louisiana Tech speech and hearing center. The three-story red brick structure is built in the Colonial Revival style of architecture. The contractor was the T. L. James Company of Ruston.

Robinson and his wife, Etta Asenah Moore Robinson (1869-1917), were both originally from Virginia. They had two children, Hunt Vaughn Robinson and Ealvise Conner Robinson, who died before their first birthdays and six children who survived into adulthood, Herbert Lynn, Fred B., Esther, Virginia, Robert Hicks, and Luther William Robinson. The Robinsons are interred at Mt. Lebanon Cemetery near Gibsland in Bienville Parish, Louisiana. His gravestone has a Woodmen of the World emblem at the base.

A later Louisiana Tech president also has a tie to Mount Lebanon. Claybrook Cottingham was the last president of Southern Baptist-affiliated Mount Lebanon College from 1905 to 1906, when he became from 1906 to 1910 a founding professor of the new Louisiana College in Pineville. His tenure as LC president stretched from 1910 to 1941, when he accepted the highest position at Louisiana Tech, then known as Louisiana Polytechnic Institute. And sixty-two years after Robinson left the Louisiana Tech presidency, F. Jay Taylor, a Gibsland native, became president and held the position for 25 years.

Preceded by Arthur T. Prescott	2nd President of Louisiana Tech University in Ruston, Louisiana; 1899–1900	Succeeded by James B. Aswell
