= Vir Phoha =

Indian American computer scientist

- Citizenship: American
- Education: Texas Tech University; Kurukshetra University
- Known for: Authentication protocol Biometric device Machine learning
- Awards: IEEE Fellow, AAAS Fellow, NAI Fellow
- Scientific career
- Workplaces: Syracuse University; Louisiana Tech University
- Thesis: Self-repair and adaptation in collective and parallel computational networks (1992)
- Doctoral advisor: William J. B. Oldham
- Website: Official Website

Vir Virander Phoha is a professor of electrical engineering and computer science at Syracuse University College of Engineering and Computer Science.

Phoha is known for developing practicable foundations of behavioral biometrics for active and continuous authentication. His research focuses on attack-averse authentication, spoof-resistance, anomaly detection, machine learning, optimized attack formulation, and spatial-temporal pattern detection and event recognition. Phoha's work also provides protection for many classified information systems and his inventions have resulted in the widespread commercial use of active authentication biometric methods.

== Education ==
Phoha earned his MSc in Mathematical statistics at Kurukshetra University in Kurukshetra, India. He came to the United States in 1988 as a graduate student at Texas Tech University, where he worked under William J. B. Oldham. His 1992 PhD thesis was titled "Self-repair and adaptation in collective and parallel computational networks".

== Career ==
Phoha began his career as professor of computer science at the University of Central Texas, now the Texas A&M University–Central Texas and was a faculty at Northeastern State University in Tahlequah, Oklahoma. Later, he was a professor of computer science and the director of the Center for Secure Cyberspace at Louisiana Tech University in Ruston, Louisiana. In 2015, Phoha was appointed professor of electrical engineering and computer science in the L.C. Smith College of Engineering and Computer Science at Syracuse University.

Phoha has published 250 papers and six books on security related topics and holds 14 U.S. patents in behavioral authentication.

Phoha serves as an associate editor for Digital Threats: Research and Practice and Transactions on Computational Social Systems journals.

== Awards ==
In 2008, Phoha was selected as an ACM Distinguished Member.

In 2017, Phoha was awarded the IEEE Region 1 Technological Innovation in Academia Award for his contributions to authentication using behavioral biometrics. He is also a fellow of Society for Design and Process Science (SDPS).

In 2018, he was elected an AAAS Fellow.

In 2020, Phoha was elected as a National Academy of Inventors fellow.

In 2022, he was named IEEE Fellow.
