= Jann Aldredge-Clanton =

American Christian minister (1946–2024)

Peggy Jannine "Jann" Jann Aldredge-Clanton
- Born: Jann Aldredge; May 3, 1946; Abilene, Texas, US
- Died: September 20, 2024 (aged 78)
- Education: Minden High School Louisiana Tech University; Texas Christian University Southwestern Baptist Theological Seminary
- Occupations: Christian minister, author, hymn writer
- Spouse: David McPhail Clanton
- Parent(s): Reverend Truman Henry Aldredge Eva Louise Hickerson Aldredge Henley Taylor Henley (stepfather)

Peggy Jannine Aldredge-Clanton, known as Jann Aldredge-Clanton(May 3, 1946 – September 20, 2024) was an ordained Christian minister, author, teacher, and chaplain, who led workshops and conferences throughout the United States. She authored eleven books, six songbooks, a children's musical, and a children's songbook. She also published many articles in publications such as Christian Feminism Today, The Journal of Pastoral Care, The Christian Ministry, and Patheos. She specialized in feminist theology and inclusive worship resources.

Ordained in the Alliance of Baptists, she ministered in ecumenical and interfaith settings. She served as co-chair of the national ecumenical, multicultural Equity for Women in the Church Community, on the council of Evangelical and Ecumenical Women's Caucus-Christian Feminism Today; adjunct professor at Richland College in Dallas, Texas; and on the Dallas Workers’ Rights Board.

Her career has included roles as a consultant for internship programs at the Perkins School of Theology in Dallas and Brite Divinity School; associate pastor at St. John’s United Methodist Church in Waco, Texas; executive director of the Waco Conference of Christians and Jews; pastoral counselor at the Samaritan Counseling Center of Central Texas; chaplain at the Baylor University Medical Center at Dallas and at Hillcrest Baptist Medical Center in Waco; and professor of English at Dallas Baptist University.

== Feminist theology and inclusive language ==
Since 1990, Aldredge-Clanton wrote, spoke, and preached about feminist theology and specifically about the need to include female language for the Divine as a foundation for equality, justice, and peace.

In her introduction to Changing Church: Stories of Liberating Ministers she writes: “My vision is for the Divine Feminine to shine forth in all Her glory in multicultural visual imagery and in the language of worship, supporting equal partnership of women and men. My vision is of a church where the Divine Feminine and women ministers don’t have to be defended or marginalized, but are fully and equally included throughout every worship service and every activity of the church. My vision is for the Sacred Feminine to be worshipped not only in Christian congregations, but in every religion all over the world, and for women to share equally in the leadership of every religion. My vision is for girls to believe they are equal to boys because they hear and see the Supreme Being worshipped as ‘She’ as well as ‘He.'”

Many traditionalists are critical of Aldredge-Clanton's views. Plumeline, a conservative Southern Baptist Convention (SBC) publication, criticizes the Cooperative Baptist Fellowship (CBF) for Aldredge-Clanton's leadership at a CBF annual gathering: “The SBC has no feminist theologian leaders calling for the worship of the ‘Christ-Sophia.’ But the CBF does. Jann Aldredge-Clanton conducted a breakout session at the 1995 General Assembly and is a promoter of feminist theology. She is the cited ‘leader’ who espouses ‘Christ-Sophia.’” Additionally The Council on Biblical Manhood and Womanhood, an evangelical organization opposing an egalitarian view of gender, takes the organization, Christians for Biblical Equality (CBE), to task for including Aldredge-Clanton's children's book, God, A Word for Girls and Boys, in the CBE webstore.

Aldredge-Clanton served as one of the contributors for the CEB (Common English Bible) Women's Bible (Common English Bible; Sew edition, 2016).

== Inclusive worship resources ==
Aldredge-Clanton wrote and published inclusive language Christian worship resources, including prayers, responsive readings, hymns set to familiar tunes, and even a children's musical.

One of the conservative critics of inclusive theology and language, Russell D. Moore, warned that the children's musical by Aldredge-Clanton and composer Larry E. Schultz, Imagine God! A Children's Musical Exploring and Expressing Images of God is "dangerous" because "feminist theologians are correct indeed that it is easier to transform the imaginations of children in thinking about God." Moore continues his critique writing, "What is at stake here are [sic] not whether the church will accommodate more ‘gender-inclusive’ language, but instead the doctrines of God and revelation—and indeed the gospel itself."

Aldredge-Clanton was one of the founders of the New Wineskins Community in Dallas, Texas. The community was founded because "We’re all in deep need of healing. We can never be all we’re created to be in the divine image until we expand our image of the Divine. That’s why New Wineskins Community creates rituals that name and image the Divine as female and male and more. Our words and images for the Divine carry great power to shape belief and actions for justice and peace."

== Personal life ==
She was born in was born in Abilene, Texas, the younger of two daughters of H. Truman Aldredge (1912–1966), the pastor from 1950 until his death of the First Baptist Church, a Southern Baptist congregation in Minden, Louisiana. She graduated in 1964 as the valedictorian of Minden High School. Her mother, Eva Louise Hickerson Aldredge Henley (1918–2016), an educator and Baptist laywoman, married another Southern Baptist pastor, Odus Taylor Henley (1918–2000), after the death of her first husband and spent her later years in San Angelo, Texas. She taught Sunday school for eighty-two years. Truman and Eva Aldredge are interred at Gardens of Memory Cemetery in Minden, Louisiana.

In 1968, Aldredge-Clanton received the Bachelor of Arts degree summa cum laude in English] from Louisiana Tech University in Ruston, then known as Louisiana Polytechnic Institute. She procured Master of Arts and PhD degrees from Texas Christian University in Fort Worth. She then obtained a Master of Divinity from Southwestern Baptist Theological Seminary, also in Fort Worth.

Aldredge-Clanton resided in Dallas with her husband, David McPhail Clanton, an artist and communications expert. They have two sons, a daughter-in-law, and three grandsons. Her sister, Anne Kathryn Aldredge Morton Funderburk (1943-2025), was the president of the Park Cities Central Dallas Democrats and in that capacity hosted debates involving city and state legislative races. She was a licensed psychologist employed by Texas Scottish Rite (Children's) Hospital for a quarter century as the head of the Psychology Department.

== Honors ==
Aldredge-Clanton's hymns have received numerous honors. "Renewing, Reforming the Church in our Day" won in the category of "New Hymn Text for Traditional Hymn Tune" in United Theological Seminary’s first annual song and hymn writing competition; the judges commented that this text "has outstanding theological significance in church renewal." In 2013, the Religious Institute selected Aldredge-Clanton’s “Praise the Source of All Creation” as the winner of its first hymn contest. In 2011, St. Peter’s Catholic Church in Charlotte, North Carolina, sponsored a hymn contest in celebration of 25 years of Jesuit leadership; her hymn “Celebrate Our Maker’s Glory” won third place. “We Come in Celebration” won honorable mention in the 2012 Alliance of Baptists hymn contest. “O Loving Creator, We Labor with You” won honorable mention in the 2007 international hymn contest sponsored by Macalester Plymouth United Church of St. Paul, Minnesota.

== Bibliography, books and music ==
- Inclusive Songs from the Heart of Gospel, with McKenzie Brown and Larry E. Schultz (Eakin Press, 2022), includes songs of liberation, justice, and peace with lyrics to familiar gospel tunes.
- Hersay: Songs for Healing and Empowerment, with Katie Ketchum (April,2020, brings healing and empowerment through songs with lyrics inclusive of the Divine Feminine, drawing from the musical styles of Taizé and other chant traditions.
- Inclusive Songs for Resistance & Social Action, with composer Larry E. Schultz (Eakin Press, 2018), includes songs for marches, rallies, and other activist gatherings to support movements such as Women’s March, Black Lives Matter, Human Rights Campaign, Poor People’s Campaign, and GreenFaith. Many of the songs are also for use in the worship services of faith communities, and some celebrate seasons of the year. Another feature of this new collection is the inclusion of songs that honor women leaders in Scripture and other prophetic women leaders.
- Building Bridges: Letha Dawson Scanzoni and Friends, with co-author Kendra Weddle (Cascade Books, 2018), illustrates Letha's growing influence as she continues her prophetic collaboration with new generations. In addition, it provides resources for churches as they build bridges for their ministries of liberation, justice, and peace.
- Intercultural Ministry: Hope for a Changing World, co-edited with Grace Ji-Sun Kim (Judson Press, 2017), explores questions such as why most churches are still segregated by race and culture. It includes chapters from a racially and denominationally diverse group of pastors, theologians, and teachers who reflect on their experiences and experiments in intercultural churches and other ministries.
- She Lives! Sophia Wisdom Works in the World (Skylight Paths Publishing, 2014). Letha Dawson Scanzoni says in "telling the stories of real people" the book "helps us move beyond the limited gender binary to see God as both male and female, yet strictly speaking, neither male nor female, and at the same time inclusive of all gender identities." She adds the book would make an "excellent selection" for a book club or study group.
- Earth Transformed with Music! Inclusive Songs for Worship, with composer Larry E. Schultz (Eakin Press, 2015). "Earth Transformed with Music! is a collection of 65 hymns and short songs, with words ... that are meant to heal and transform the earth, society, and each individual singer. Reading the introduction and notes section is like reading an introduction to contemporary Christian feminism.”
- Changing Church: Stories of Liberating Ministers (Cascade Books, 2011)
- Inclusive Hymns for Liberation, Peace, and Justice, with composer Larry E. Schultz (Eakin Press, 2011). This inclusive language hymnal provides a “balance of male-female divine images [allowing] women and girls, men and boys a greater sense of the wholeness of God's good creation."
- Seeking Wisdom: Inclusive Blessings and Prayers for Public Occasions (Wipf and Stock Publishers, 2010). Liturgical resource using inclusive language.
- Inclusive Hymns for Liberating Christians, with composer Larry E. Schultz (Eakin Press, 2006). A hymnal with new "texts that sing easily and carry some of the ‘feeling-content’ of older texts that have been sung to these tunes, while moving us into a new theological space.”
- Breaking Free: The Story of a Feminist Baptist Minister (Eakin Press, 2002). An autobiographical work.
- Praying with Christ-Sophia: Services for Healing and Renewal (Twenty-Third Publications,1996; Wipf and Stock Publishers, 2007). This book includes hymns and rituals for seasons of the liturgical year, such as Advent and Pentecost, as well as rituals for mourning loss, for wise aging, for healing, for peacemaking, and for baby dedications. One reviewer calls the book an “impressive collection of litanies, prayers, and hymns.”
- In Search of the Christ-Sophia: An Inclusive Christology for Liberating Christians (Twenty-Third Publications, 1995; Eakin Press, 2004). This book explores the biblical and historical connection between Christ and Wisdom (Sophia in the Greek language of the Christian Scriptures). Rosemary Radford Ruether calls the book "ground-breaking" and a "’must’ book for all concerned with an inclusive and liberating theology and church."
- Imagine God! A Children's Musical Exploring and Expressing Images of God, with composer Larry E. Schultz (Choristers Guild, 2004).
- In Whose Image? God and Gender (Crossroad, 1990; revised and expanded edition, 2001). Selected "Editors’ Choice" in The Other Side magazine and described as a "wonderful resource for people moving toward both a more inclusive theology and a more inclusive worship style." The review continues: “In a style well-suited for church discussion groups, Jann Aldredge-Clanton affirms ‘the unlimited God’ of Scripture, explores the interaction of God-language and self-esteem in women, and proposes various models for change.”
- Counseling People with Cancer (Westminster John Knox, 1998). The Princeton Seminary Bulletin refers to the book as “compelling,” assisting people to reflect on their cancer experiences and “encouraging” them “to tell their stories” and to expand their images of the Divine.
- God, A Word for Girls and Boys (Glad River, 1993; Wipf and Stock Publishers, 2007).
- Sing and Dance and Play with Joy! Inclusive Songs for Young Children, with composer Larry E. Schultz (Lulu, 2009).
