= George W. Bond =

George William Bond
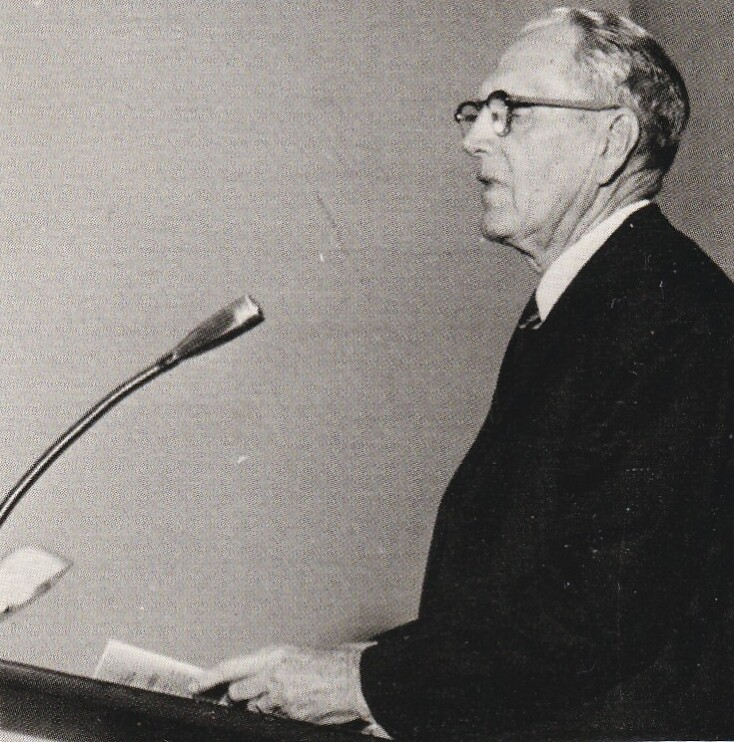

8th President of Louisiana Tech University
- In office May 18, 1928 – June 1936
- Preceded by: John R. Conniff
- Succeeded by: Edwin Sanders "E. S." Richardson

Personal details
- Born: April 6, 1891 Summers; Washington County; Arkansas, USA
- Died: May 14, 1974 (aged 83) Fayetteville; Washington County
- Resting place: Fairview Memorials Gardens in Fayetteville
- Spouse: Mary Elizabeth Bost Bond
- Children: No children
- Parent(s): William Elijah and Martha Irene Simpson Bond
- Education: University of Arkansas; University of Chicago
- Occupation: College president; Professor

George William Bond (April 6, 1891 – May 14, 1974) was president of two public universities in Louisiana, Louisiana Tech in Ruston and Southeastern Louisiana University in Hammond, in the first half of the 20th century.

== Background, education, and early life ==
Bond was born in Summers in Washington County in Northwest Arkansas to William Elijah Bond (1864-1953) and his wife, the former Martha Irene Simpson (1866-1940). He graduated from Cincinnati High School in Cincinnati in Washington County near Fayetteville, Arkansas.

Bond served in the United States Army during World War I. He attended the University of Arkansas at Fayetteville and University of Chicago, from which he obtained a master's degree in 1923. Bond married the former Mary Elizabeth Bost (1898-1997), also a native of Summers. She was a Latin teacher.

== Academic career ==
Bond first taught in the towns of Springdale and Cane Hill, which are also in Washington County. He moved to Bauxite, where he was superintendent of the public schools in Saline County in central Arkansas. He next served as a principal in Texarkana.

In 1924, he relocated to Ruston, Louisiana to become an education professor at Louisiana Tech. He was selected as the university's eighth president, serving from 1928 to 1936. While president, he continued to work on his Ph.D. from the University of Chicago. He resigned from Louisiana Tech before completing his terminal degree.

Two weeks before leaving Louisiana Tech, Bond broke ground for the new $421,000 administration building known first as Leche Hall, after Governor Richard Leche, and then renamed for John Ephraim Keeny, the sixth president of Louisiana Tech.

The Minden Herald in Minden, Louisiana, reported in 1936 that Bond left Ruston to enroll in the doctoral program at Columbia University in New York City.

From 1944 to 1945, Bond was the acting fourth president at Southeastern Louisiana University in Hammond.

== Later years ==
In later life, Bond and his wife Mary Elizabeth lived in Searcy and Fayetteville, Arkansas, where they engaged in gardening, travel, and entertaining. They were members of the Presbyterian Church. He also was a member of the Masonic lodge. Mary Elizabeth was widowed and survived her husband by 23 years, continuing to live in Fayetteville. Both are interred there at Fairview Memorial Gardens.

Preceded by John R. Conniff	8th President of Louisiana Tech University in Ruston, Louisiana; 1928–1936	Succeeded by Edwin Sanders "E. S." Richardson
Preceded by J. Leon Clark	Acting 4th President of Southeastern Louisiana University in Hammond, Louisiana; 1944–1945	Succeeded by Gladney Jack Tinsley
