= Arthur T. Prescott =

Arthur Taylor Prescott Sr.
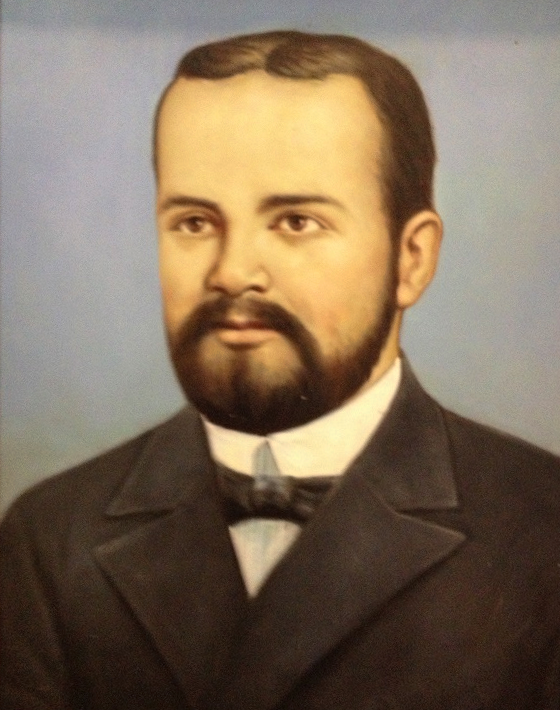
- Prescott (c. 1899)

1st President of Louisiana Tech University
- In office 1895–1899
- Succeeded by: W. C. Robinson

Personal details
- Born: June 11, 1863 Mansfield, Louisiana, C.S.
- Died: May 16, 1942 (aged 78) Baton Rouge, Louisiana, U.S.
- Party: Democratic
- Spouse: Nellie Daugherty Prescott (married 1888-1933, her death)
- Children: 6
- Education: Louisiana State University
- Occupation: Educator; College president

Arthur Taylor Prescott Sr. (11 June 1863 – 16 May 1942) was a political scientist and educator who was the founding president of Louisiana Tech University in Ruston, Louisiana. Most of his educational administrative career, however, was spent at his alma mater, Louisiana State University in Baton Rouge.

== Background ==
Prescott was one of six children born to Ben Prescott, I, and the former Kate Taylor. The second oldest son (a brother died in infancy), he was born during the American Civil War in Mansfield, the parish seat of DeSoto Parish in northwestern Louisiana, south of Shreveport. Before he was a year old, the Battle of Mansfield was fought in DeSoto Parish, a rare Confederate victory at that phase of the ongoing Civil War. Ben Prescott, an LSU graduate, was a sugar planter in his native of Washington in St. Landry Parish near Opelousas in South Louisiana. Kate Taylor Prescott was a native of the Georgetown section of Washington, D.C.

Prescott was educated privately in St. Landry Parish. In 1883, he received his Bachelor of Arts degree from LSU, from which he subsequently obtained his Master of Arts as well. As an undergraduate, he was a member of Kappa Alpha Order fraternity. His first teaching assignment was for one year in Port Allen in West Baton Rouge Parish. The next year, he was a school principal in Marshall in East Texas.

== Academic career ==
In 1887, Prescott was named commandant of the student cadet organization at the University of Virginia in Charlottesville, Virginia, in which capacity he acquired the rank of colonel, a designation by which he was thereafter usually addressed. He left the position with the UV cadets in 1893, and the next year became the first president of Louisiana Tech though there were no actual classes until September 1895. His salary was $1,500 per year, nearly twice that of most of the five original faculty members. One of those faculty members, the mathematics professor W. C. Robinson, would serve for a year as Prescott's presidential successor. Originally known as Louisiana Industrial Institute and then Louisiana Polytechnic Institute, Louisiana Tech is an outgrowth of the former Ruston College, begun in the middle 1880s by W. C. Friley, a Southern Baptist clergyman who was subsequently the first president from 1892 to 1894 of Hardin-Simmons University in Abilene, Texas, and the second president of Louisiana College in Pineville from 1909 to 1910.

Louisiana State Representative George M. Lomax of Lincoln Parish pushed for the enabling legislation for the college, Act 68, and the first $20,000 start-up appropriation.

Arthur Prescott is the father of the Louisiana Tech Prescott Memorial Library, which began as a reading room of "Old Main", the Tech administration building, with all initial 125 volumes donated from Prescott's personal collection of mostly studies in engineering, philosophy, religion, science, art, and history. A three-story Prescott Library building opened in 1961; years later it was linked in expanded facilities with the adjacent Wyly Tower of Learning. Louisiana Tech also honors Prescott with the Distinguished Arthur T. Prescott Professorship, an award once held by, among others, former Tech President Daniel Reneau.

In 1899, he returned to LSU as professor of government and constitutional law. Like his father, Prescott was an active Democrat. He served on the Louisiana State Tax Commission under Governor Newton C. Blanchard. He was a member of the American Political Science Association and the Academy of Political Science in New York City. Prescott was also a member of the Chamber of Commerce, a director of the Commercial Securities Company and the Union Homestead Association, and a vice president of the Union Bank & Trust Company. During World War I, Prescott worked in drives to promote the sale of war bonds and lectured soldiers awaiting departure to war at Camp Beauregard near Pineville, Louisiana.

Because of his interest in public law, Professor Prescott in 1904 was the first to propose the establishment of what became in 1906 the Louisiana State University Law Center, with an original enrollment of nineteen students, subsequently named in honor of law professor Paul M. Hebert.

After the retirement of LSU President Thomas Duckett Boyd, the board of supervisors in 1926 and 1927 considered Prescott for the top position. He was the choice of Boyd and virtually all of the faculty. However, it was determined that Prescott, then sixty-four, was "too old" for the post, an oddity considering that some may have thought him "too young" at thirty-one when he was named the founding Louisiana Tech president. Prescott continued at the time as the secretary of the supervisors and as university dean of arts and sciences. After their first choice was unable to serve because of military retirement considerations, the supervisors settled on Thomas Wilson Atkinson, a professor of engineering.

Prescott Hall at LSU is named in his honor; it is on the National Register of Historic Places.

== Family and death ==
Prescott was a member of the Masonic lodge; he was a communicant of St. James Church in Baton Rouge, a Protestant Episcopal congregation. On January 4, 1888, Prescott married Nellie Daugherty, also an Episcopalian and the daughter of John A. Daugherty and the former Lucy Stewart, both of Baton Rouge. The Prescotts had six children, the Baton Rouge veterinarian Arthur Prescott Jr. (1892-1968); Lucy Stewart King (1896-1986), the wife of Clifford H. King (1898-1939), a real estate agent in Baton Rouge who died early in life, Allen Worden Prescott (1889-1954), Ben Prescott, II (1899-1975), who in 1924 was a banker in Paris, France, and two younger daughters, Kate Taylor Prescott and Elvira Garig Prescott, unmarried in 1924; married names not available. Elvira married Howard Davidson Muse.

A year before his death, the Louisiana State University Press published Prescott's lengthy volume with even a long sub-title, Drafting the Federal Constitution.

Preceded by N/A	1st President of Louisiana Tech University in Ruston, Louisiana; 1895–1899	Succeeded by W. C. Robinson
