= Laurens Henry Cohn Sr. Memorial Plant Arboretum =

Arboretum in Baton Rouge, Louisiana, United States

Coordinates: 30°33′28″N 91°7′8″W

- Interactive map of Laurens Henry Cohn Sr. Memorial Plant Arboretum
- Website: Official website

The Laurens Henry Cohn Sr. Memorial Plant Arboretum (or Cohn Arboretum), 16 acres (6.5 hectares), is an arboretum located at 12206 Foster Road, Baton Rouge, Louisiana. It is open to the public daily.

The Arboretum contains more than 120 species of native and adaptable trees and shrubs, including a Japanese Maple collection, an Orchid and Bromeliad House, a Tropical House, a Camellia Collection, an Evergreen and Conifer Collection, a Crape-myrtle Collection, and an Herb/Fragrance Garden.

== See also ==
- List of botanical gardens in the United States
