= Charles R. Embry =

Charles R. Embry is Professor Emeritus of Political Science at Texas A&M University–Commerce, he joined then East Texas State University in 1969. Embry has just published The Philosopher and the Storyteller: Eric Voegelin and Twentieth-Century Literature, University of Missouri Press, ISBN 978-0-8262-1790-5. Embry previously edited the following two books: Robert B. Heilman and Eric Voegelin: A Friendship in Letters, 1944–1984 and coeditor of Philosophy, Literature, and Politics: Essays Honoring Ellis Sandoz.

Embry studied under Ellis Sandoz at Louisiana Tech University and John Hallowell at Duke University and is an active member in the Eric Voegelin Society, presenting at many annual meetings.

In 2005 Embry was the chair for a panel titled, The Evocation of Experience: Poetry and Eric Voegelin's Theory of Symbolization at the Eric Voegelin Society Conference in Washington, D.C.

In 2004 Embry presented "The Literary Criticism of Eric Voegelin in his Correspondence with Robert B. Heilman" at the 20th Annual Eric Voegelin Society conference held in Chicago, Illinois.

In 2003 Embry presented "Show me something snaky" at the annual meeting of the American Political Science Association, Philadelphia Marriott Hotel, Philadelphia, PA.
