= Louisiana Tech University Arboretum =

Arboretum in Ruston, Louisiana, US

Coordinates: 32°31′47″N 92°38′26″W

- Interactive map of Louisiana Tech University Arboretum

The Louisiana Tech University Arboretum (50 acres, 20 hectares) is located on the South Campus of the Louisiana Tech University in Ruston, Louisiana. The arboretum is used by the university's School of Forestry as a research facility.

== See also ==
- List of botanical gardens in the United States
