= Onega Ulanova =

Kazakh-American businesswoman

- Born: Kazakhstan
- Education: Karaganda State Technical University; Louisiana Tech University
- Occupation: Businesswoman
- Years active: 2013–present
- Organization: LA New Product Development Team
- Spouse: Konstantin Dolgan
- Website: https://lanpdt.com

Onega Ulanova is a Kazakh-American businesswoman. She is the co-founder of the American product design and prototyping company LA New Product Development Team (LA NPDT), the founder of oil and gas industry marketing and business development firm OKGlobal, and the co-founder of QMS2Go, a provider of AI-powered quality management system tools. Ulanova is also a contributing writer to Entrepreneur Magazine and serves as a leadership member of several national small business organizations.

== Early life and education ==
A native of Kazakhstan, Ulanova began her higher educational pursuits at Karaganda State Technical University (KSTU), from which she graduated with a Bachelor of Science degree in standardization, metrology and certification. While studying at KSTU, Ulanova met fellow student Konstantin Dolgan, who was similarly training to become an engineer; the two began a relationship and were later married. In 2010, Dolgan was admitted into a student exchange program at Louisiana Tech University, and Ulanova immigrated with him to the United States in hopes of attending the same school. While Dolgan had already gained admittance to Louisiana Tech, Ulanova had not, and at the time spoke no English. Despite failing three consecutive English exams, Ulanova remained undaunted and undertook an intensive crash-course in language studies, clocking seventeen-hour days to learn the language as quickly as possible. In six months, she had succeeded and gained admittance to Louisiana Tech's graduate studies program. Ulanova graduated from Louisiana Tech with a Master of Science degree in engineering and technology management in 2013. Later in her professional career, Ulanova returned to Louisiana Tech and graduated with a Master of Business Administration in 2019.

== Career ==
While attending Louisiana Tech together, Dolgan and Ulanova began considering ways to expand their engineering expertise while learning business skills. In 2013, Ulanova and Dolgan established What's Up Ruston?, an informational web resource connecting students with opportunities in the region, which was recognized by Louisiana Tech's New Venture Championship program. That same year, Ulanova assisted Dolgan in founding a student organization, the LA New Product Development Team (LA NPDT). This group focused on actualizing product designs based on research conducted by University students and faculty; participation by alumni was also welcomed. Within several months, the organization gained the support of the Louisiana business community, with startups requesting prototyping services for their products. After Ulanova and Dolgan graduated in 2013 and 2014, respectively, they sought to transform the student organization into a full company. Needing to secure funds and experience to accomplish this, the couple moved to Bossier City, Louisiana to seek work. Ulanova joined the American Petroleum Institute as the organization's youngest female lead quality management system auditor; the position led her to conduct over one hundred facility audits in six countries during the two years she spent with the organization. Connections she built while working with the Institute would later help in the launch of her energy services marketing firm OKGlobal. By 2016, Dolgan and Ulanova had saved enough money to quit their jobs and launch LA NPDT as a company, opening their first office in the Shreveport–Bossier City metropolitan area with a team of 30 developers; Dolgan served as the CEO, while Ulanova served as managing partner. Rather than specializing in a single field, the company sought to work with a large number of diverse clients, gaining experience prototyping and designing over 600 products ranging from medical devices to energy industry tools to sex toys. The company was the first and only product design firm in the Shreveport–Bossier area.

Within its first two years of operation, LA NPDT and Ulanova achieved regional recognition. In 2018, the private economic development organization BRF honored Ulanova, Dolgan, and LA NPDT by highlighting the company through their Entrepreneurial Accelerator Program as one of the top 10 startups of the year in Northern Louisiana. Also in 2018, the Shreveport Chamber of Commerce recognized LA NPDT, as well as Dolgan and Ulanova, with a Minority Business Opportunity Award for Emerging Business of the Year. In 2019, Ulanova and Dolgan co-organized the non-profit business conference Tech to Market, an initiative which brought entrepreneurs from throughout the state of Louisiana together for a pair of events; Ulanova subsequently expanded the venture into an online community focused on matchmaking startups with funding and growth opportunities. In 2020, Ulanova was named by the Shreveport-Bossier Chambers of Congress as one of their 40 entrepreneurs under 40 years of age, and was identified by SGA Talent as one of the foremost female leaders in America's top engineering and design firms. Also in 2020, LA NPDT was recognized on the Inc. Magazine 5000 list of fastest-growing American companies of the year, achieving 384% year-on-year growth, the top rank in the Shreveport-Bossier area, and the 12th-highest ranking for the state of Louisiana. In 2021, the company expanded by moving office operations to Miami, while adding capacity to the Shreveport-Bossier operation to focus on prototyping and manufacturing. By 2022, consumer products designed by the company were being sold nationwide in mass-market retailers including Walmart and Target, while select products manufactured directly by the company, including the Leia menstrual cup brand, began mass-market retail sale in 2023.

In addition to her work with LA NPDT, Ulanova has established other companies, including the oil and gas marketing services firm OKGlobal (founded in 2019), the startup assistance organization Tech to Market (founded in 2019), and the Kazakhstan-based film and video production talent marketplace Assist.Video (founded in 2020). In 2023, Ulanova and Dolgan co-founded QMS2Go, an AI software services provider for quality managers in the manufacturing industry; in 2024, QMS2Go was awarded a $25,000 equity investment by Opportunity Hub and Greater New Orleans Inc.'s Climate Tech Bootcamp. Ulanova joined the National Small Business Association's Leadership Council in 2020, as well as the board of directors of the Retail Design Institute's Atlanta-Southeast chapter in 2022.

== Personal life ==
Ulanova and her husband Konstantin Dolgan reside in Bossier City, Louisiana. She is a triathlete.
