= Nick Akins =

American businessman

Nicholas Akins was the chief executive officer (CEO) and president of American Electric Power (AEP), a major investor-owner electric utility in the United States.

== Career ==
Akins is the tenth president and sixth CEO in AEP's history and has served in that capacity since 2010. Akins serves as the only management representative on the AEP board of directors. From 2006 to 2010, Akins served as AEP's executive vice president of generation. From 2004 to 2006, Akins served as president and chief operating officer for Southwestern Electric Power Company. Prior to that, Akins served as vice president of energy marketing services and before that vice president of industry restructuring for AEP. Akins rose through the ranks at Central and South West Corp. (CSW) before the company merged with AEP in 2000. Akins earned a bachelor's degree in electrical engineering from Louisiana Tech University in 1982 and his master's degree also in electrical engineering from Louisiana Tech in 1986.

Akins is the immediate past chairman and a member of the board of directors of the Electric Power Research Institute (EPRI). He is also a member of the boards of American Coalition of Clean Coal Electricity (ACCCE), Edison Electric Institute (EEI), Nuclear Energy Institute (NEI), National Association of Manufacturers, Mid-Ohio Foodbank, Greater Columbus Arts Council, and the Wexner Center for the Arts. He also serves on several subsidiary boards of AEP.

== Personal life ==
Akins is a native of Louisiana. He and his wife Donna live in New Albany, Ohio.
