= Konstantin Dolgan =

Kazakh businessman

- Born: January 24, 1987 (age 39); Karaganda, Kazakhstan
- Education: Karaganda State Technical University; Louisiana Tech University
- Occupation: CEO
- Years active: 2013–present
- Organization: LA New Product Development Team
- Spouse: Onega Ulanova
- Website: https://lanpdt.com

Konstantin Dolgan is a Kazakh-American businessman. He is the co-founder and CEO of LA New Product Development Team (LA NPDT), a product design and prototyping company. Dolgan additionally co-founded the company Grapheno, a producer of graphene-based conductive coating for electronics, as a side-venture of LA NPDT, co-founded QMS2Go, a provider of AI-powered quality management system tools, and is the co-author of Realizr, a product ideation guidebook. He was featured as one of Forbes The Next 1000 upcoming American entrepreneurs in 2021.

== Early life and education ==
Konstantin Dolgan was born in Karaganda, Kazakhstan in 1987. Fascinated since childhood with technology and engineering, he also gained an entrepreneurial spirit from his parents, with whom he worked as a young man. He graduated from Karaganda State Technical University (KSTU) with a Bachelor of Science degree in mechanical engineering in 2008, and followed it with a Master of Science degree in technological machines and equipment from the same university. In 2010, Dolgan met his future wife Onega Ulanova while studying at KSTU. After Dolgan was invited to continue his doctorate studies at KSTU's American affiliate Louisiana Tech University, he and Ulanova moved to the United States, and both were admitted to Louisiana Tech. Dolgan graduated from Louisiana Tech with a Doctor of Philosophy degree in materials and infrastructure systems engineering in 2014.

== Career ==
Prior to graduating from Louisiana Tech, and while working on his dissertation, Dolgan started to consider ways he could combine his technical knowledge and entrepreneurial spirit. He began by assisting the university's professors with commercializing their inventions and research, and also joined the school's intellectual property committee. In 2013, Dolgan and Ulanova established What's Up Ruston?, an informational web resource connecting students with opportunities in the region, which was recognized by Louisiana Tech's New Venture Championship program. Also that year, the pair founded a student organization, the LA New Product Development Team (LA NPDT), which later evolved into their company of the same name. The student group focused on actualizing product prototypes based on research generated at the university. Dolgan advertised the idea by posting fliers around campus; within several weeks, nearly 50 students, faculty members, and alumni had joined the group. Further talent joined over the following months, and the group soon attracted the attention of Louisiana businesspeople within the startup community, who requested assistance in developing workable products for their concepts. After graduating, Dolgan and Ulanova expanded the student group into a full company, opening their first office in the Shreveport–Bossier City metropolitan area in 2016 with an initial team of 30 international developers. To maximize opportunities, the new company remained open to requests from a broad range of local and statewide clients, and as a result gained experience providing prototypes and design engineering for a diverse group of product types, including medical devices, consumer electronics, sex toys, and equipment for the oil and gas industry. One area of particular interest for the company was for research into electromagnetic shielding solutions. Working with a team of researchers at Louisiana Tech, Dolgan focused on the properties of graphene and developed a proprietary solution, Grapheno, which combines graphene and paint to serve as a coating. After receiving a research grant from Louisiana Tech, Dolgan initiated further development of Grapheno as a side project of LA NPDT, and in 2016, launched a separate company with co-founder Avery Lorenzato to produce and market the coating. Having founded two companies within two years, Dolgan was able to achieve his aim of combining research and entrepreneurship into ventures he could directly manage.

LA NPDT benefited from support by the Shreveport-Bossier community and the state of Louisiana as a whole. In 2017, Dolgan was named to the Silicon Bayou 100, a list of the top technology entrepreneurs in Louisiana; he was subsequently recognized for the same honor in 2018 and 2019 as well. Later that year, he was highlighted by a joint effort of the Shreveport and Bossier Chambers of Congress as one of their 40 entrepreneurs under 40 years of age. In 2018, the private economic development organization BRF's Entrepreneurial Accelerator Program honored Dolgan and Ulanova by recognizing the company as one of the top 10 startups of the year in Northern Louisiana. That same year, the Shreveport Chamber of Commerce recognized LA NPDT, as well as Dolgan and Ulanova, with a Minority Business Opportunity Award for Emerging Business of the Year. In 2019, Dolgan co-founded and launched the non-profit business conference Tech to Market, an initiative which brought together entrepreneurs from throughout the state of Louisiana; the conference subsequently evolved into an online community focused on matchmaking startups with funding and growth opportunities. Dolgan and LA NPDT were subsequently named to Entrepreneur Magazine's 360 List for 2019, ranking 39th among recent American startups. In 2020, LA NPDT's successful expansion led to recognition by Louisiana Economic Development, the state government's economic support group for small and emerging businesses, as a finalist for the state's Growth Leadership Award. After the first several years of operation, Dolgan saw a new opportunity for the company: small batch contract manufacturing. LA NPDT increased its production capabilities, offering manufacturing as an additional service for customers. In time, this became a major source of the company's revenue. In 2020, as the COVID-19 pandemic strained the American healthcare system, LA NPDT's manufacturing abilities were put to public use, with the company's 3D printing machines utilized to produce thousands of face shields for healthcare workers in Louisiana and throughout the country. By the end of the year, Dolgan began to receive national recognition for LA NPDT's rapid growth. LA NPDT was recognized on the Inc. Magazine 5000 list of fastest-growing American companies in 2020, ranking at 1,181st with 384% year-on-year growth; this earned the company the top rank in the Shreveport-Bossier area, and 12th for the state of Louisiana as a whole. In 2021, the company expanded by moving office operations to Miami, while adding capacity to the Shreveport-Bossier operation to focus on prototyping and manufacturing. Dolgan ended 2021 by being named to the Forbes The Next 1000 list of up and coming entrepreneurial talents.

In 2022, Dolgan began the next phase of LA NPDT's expansion. Collaborating with his sister Lena Dolgan, an OB/GYN, Dolgan co-developed the company's first consumer brand, the Leia menstrual cup. By 2023, LA NPDT had developed over 600 products, with consumer products designed by the company being sold in mass-market retailers including Walmart and Target, and select products manufactured by the company, including the Leia cup brand, receiving both direct-sale and mass-market retail distribution.

In 2023, Dolgan and Ulanova launched a new company, QMS2Go, to provide AI-driven quality management system software for companies in the manufacturing sector. The following year, the company received a $25,000 investment from Opportunity Hub and Greater New Orleans Inc.'s Climate Tech Bootcamp to empower the expansion of the business.

== Personal life ==
Dolgan has served as a volunteer teacher for Junior Achievement, and as a mentor for the Bayou Classic BizTech Challenge to aid students at historically black colleges and universities in the creation of technology-based business concepts, Dolgan and his wife Onega Ulanova live in Bossier City, Louisiana.
