= Jack Ramsaur II =

United States Air Force general

Jack W. Ramsaur II
- Military career
- Allegiance: United States
- Branch: United States Air Force
- Service years: 1974–present
- Rank: Major General
- Unit: United States Strategic Command
- Awards: Defense Superior Service Medal; Legion of Merit; Meritorious Service Medal (two oak leaf clusters); Aerial Achievement Medal; Air Force Commendation Medal; Air Force Achievement Medal (one oak leaf cluster)

Major General Jack W. Ramsaur II (born c. 1952) is the mobilization assistant to the commander, United States Strategic Command, Offutt Air Force Base, Nebraska. He is the principal advisor to the commander on Reserve Component matters. He assists the director in planning and executing all assigned missions. He began his Air Force career in 1974 and is a command pilot with more than 5,300 flying hours.

== Biography ==
The general began his Air Force career in 1974 upon receiving his commission through the Air Force Reserve Officer Training Corps. His first operational assignment was at Barksdale Air Force Base, LA where he served as a KC-135 pilot and simulator instructor for the 71st Air Refueling Squadron; from there he transferred to the 78th Air Refueling Squadron as a pilot and evaluator. His subsequent positions include instructor pilot of the 76th Air Refueling Squadron, McGuire Air Force Base, N.J., squadron commander of the 970th Associate Airborne Control Squadron, Tinker Air Force Base, OK., senior individual mobilization augmentee to the director, plans and programs, Headquarters Air Force, Pentagon, Washington D.C., assistant deputy commander of operations of the 340th Flying Training Group, Randolph Air Force Base, Texas, vice commander of the 916th Air Refueling Wing, Seymour Johnson Air Force Base, N.C., and mobilization assistant, commander of the 19th Air Force, Randolph Air Force Base, Texas. Prior to his current position he was the mobilization assistant, director of global operations, USSTRATCOM, Offutt Air Force Base, Neb.

General Ramsaur is a command pilot with more than 5,300 hours in the B-707, B-727, E-3, C-18, DC-10, KC-10, KC-135A/R, T-37, T-38 and T-1 aircraft. The general earned a Bachelor of Science and Master of Arts degree at Louisiana Tech University. He attended: Squadron Officer School by correspondence; Air Command and Staff by correspondence; Air War College by correspondence.

== Awards ==
His major awards include the Defense Superior Service Medal, Legion of Merit, the Meritorious Service Medal with two oak leaf clusters, the Aerial Achievement Medal, the Air Force Commendation Medal and the Air Force Achievement Medal with one oak leaf cluster.

- Defense Superior Service Medal
- Legion of Merit
- Meritorious Service Medal with two oak leaf clusters
- Aerial Achievement Medal
- Air Force Commendation Medal
- Air Force Achievement Medal with one oak leaf cluster
