= John Simoneaux =

American singer

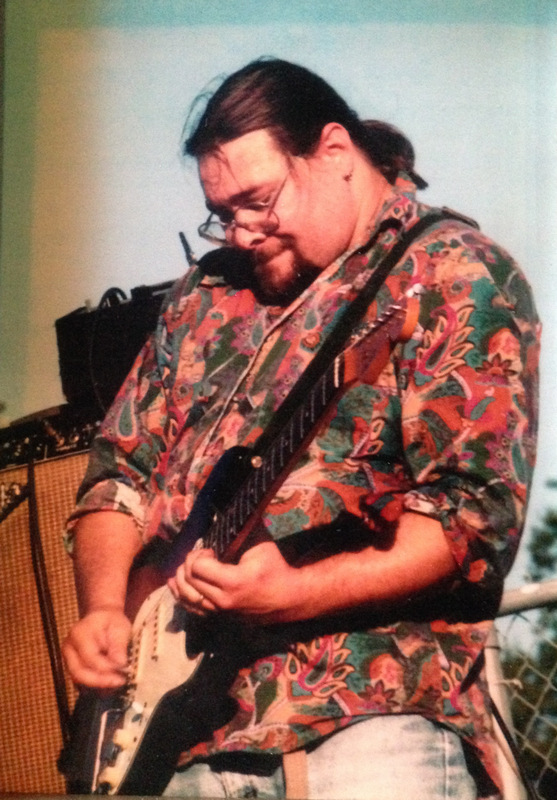
- Simoneaux in north central Louisiana, 2015

Background information
- Also known as: Streakin' Johnny
- Born: Johnny Simoneaux; April 24, 1967; Baton Rouge, Louisiana, U.S.
- Origin: Ruston, Louisiana, U.S.
- Died: January 17, 2000 (aged 32)
- Genres: Blues; soul; funk; rock
- Occupations: Musician; songwriter
- Instruments: Guitar; vocals
- Years active: 1980s–2000

John Simoneaux (April 24, 1967 – January 17, 2000) was a musician and songwriter for the bands Blue Monday and Howard Shaft Horns. He became popular in Ruston, Louisiana, hosting the "Tuesday Night Blues Jam" at the Sundown Tavern in Ruston with his friends backing him as the house band. Simoneaux played throughout Louisiana, toured nationally with Doug Duffey in 1998, and in 1999, performed in Switzerland and other European countries before dying in a car accident while traveling to Austin, Texas for a gig with The Roadhouse Disciples.

Simoneaux's only publicly-released music was an early studio effort with Howard Shaft, Blue Monday and the Howard Shaft Horns, which was released to fans in limited quantities. His second CD was with Christopher Ames (a.k.a. Chris Rhoads). William "Skippy" Clarke, a friend and fan of Simoneaux, was the booking agent for both Chris Rhoads and Blue Monday and the Howard Shaft Horns. Simoneaux, Ryan Munsey, Skippy, and Shawn Smith went to a Texas studio that was supposedly where SRV had done some recording, where John played the electric guitar on some tracks, Ryan Munsey played bass, and Smith and Clarke are both credited on one song as well. The CD by Christopher Ames as "Chris Rhoads" on Deep Blues, a blues-based Christian CD.

== Biography ==
Simoneaux was born in Baton Rouge, Louisiana, United States, where he first learned to play guitar as a young man. He played football at Redemptorist High School, graduating in 1985. Simoneaux also played in a heavy metal band, Reaper, during high school. In 1996, he earned a BFA in classical guitar performance from Louisiana Tech University. He also studied classical music in Santiago de Compostela, Spain.

As soon as he "looked old enough," Simoneaux began to play with the musicians at Tabby Thomas's "Tabby's Blues Box" in Baton Rouge. While at Louisiana Tech, he started performing with the locals and went on to become the leader of the house band at the Sundown Tavern in Ruston. He also founded the band Blue Monday (named as a tribute to the then-recently deceased Stevie Ray Vaughan) and performed all across North Louisiana. He later joined with a group of horn players that became known as the Howard Shaft Horns, named after "getting the shaft" at a talent contest held at the Louisiana Tech's Howard Auditorium.

After Blue Monday and the Howard Shaft Horns parted ways, Simoneaux formed the band Monday's Child. The band consisted of John on guitar and vocals, Ryan Munsey (his friend, schoolmate, and former house band member) on bass, and Speedy Mercer (his friend, fellow Louisiana Tech student, student of the Tuesday Night Jams at the Sundown, and eventual former house band member) also known as "Dr Speed," on drums. Once Monday's Child was ready to turn professional and go on tour, Speedy dropped out to keep his day job and was replaced by Donovan Hatcher, a longtime friend, schoolmate, and Blue Monday drummer. The three musicians moved to Austin, Texas and performed in and around Austin as the Roadhouse Disciples. They eventually toured Switzerland and nearby countries, backing Doug Duffy and also performing as the Roadhouse Disciples, without Duffy.

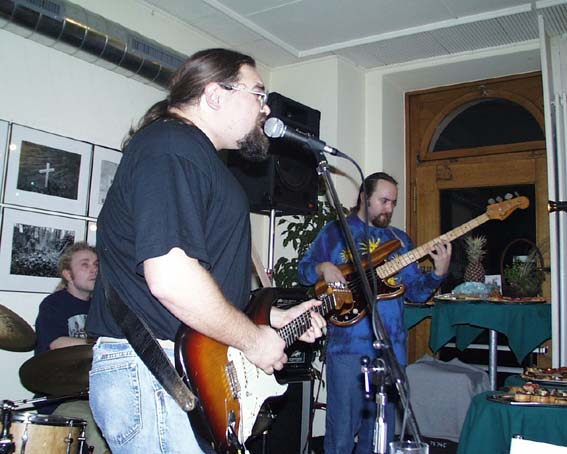
John Simoneaux and the Roadhouse Disciples in Switzerland

On June 5, 1998, in a private civil ceremony, John married fellow Louisiana Tech student Alison Bowden. The couple had a public wedding, with family and friends in attendance, in a Ruston church on January 23, 1999.

John and Alison at the 6th Street Grill in Monroe, LA where John was playing on New Year's Eve

Shortly after the band's return from the Switzerland tour, John and Alison had dinner at a Chili Verde restaurant in Monroe, LA with a few friends. The next day, Simoneaux was killed in an accident on a foggy Texas road on his way back to Austin.

== Selected discography ==
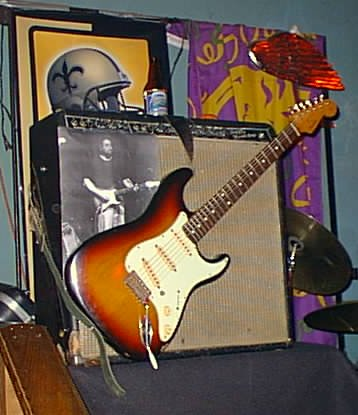
Simoneaux's guitar and amplifier on stage at the 1st Memorial Johnny Jam held in his honor, at the Sundown Tavern, Ruston, Louisiana

- Blue Monday and the Howard Shaft Horns, Blue Monday and the Howard Shaft Horns (self-released, 1997)
- Christopher Ames (billed as "Chris Rhoads"), Deep Blues (self-released, 1998)[CD]
