= Martie Cordaro =

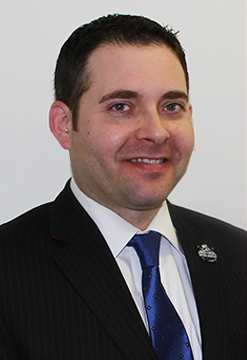
- Occupation(s): President of Omaha Storm Chasers and Union Omaha

Martie Cordaro is an American baseball and soccer executive who is the team president of the Omaha Storm Chasers, the Triple-A affiliate of Major League Baseball’s Kansas City Royals, and USL League One professional soccer team Union Omaha.

== Early life and education ==
Cordaro is a 1991 graduate of Louisiana Tech University with a Bachelor of Science degree in marketing, and served three seasons as director of marketing for his alma mater's baseball program. At the same time, he also worked as general manager in the property management department for Today's Realty, Inc. In 1991, Cordaro graduated from Ruston High School in Louisiana. Cordaro played drums in several bands, most notably in high school and college with artists such as Robert Schneider, of Apples in Stereo and The Elephant 6 Recording Company; and Jeff Mangum. He also primarily played in Stonybridge as well as Pummel with music industry leader, Brad Belanger. Martie currently plays drums in Nebraska band, Strange Pleasures.

== Early career ==
Cordaro began his professional baseball career with the West Tenn Diamond Jaxx (Double-A, Chicago Cubs) of the Southern League as a group sales representative in 1999. He then would go on to spend two seasons as director of sales for the Birmingham Barons, the Double-A affiliate of the Chicago White Sox, before becoming general manager for the Southwest Michigan Devil Rays then the Single-A affiliate of the Tampa Bay Rays, for two years.

== Omaha Storm Chasers ==
Cordaro moved to Omaha in 2007, joining the organization as assistant general manager before being promoted to the general manager the next year.

Cordaro played a large role in every aspect of the research, negotiation process and project management to build a new ballpark for the Storm Chasers in Sarpy County, allowing Triple-A Baseball to remain in the Omaha metro area. He was also involved in orchestrating and negotiating the ballpark's naming rights partnership with Sarpy County-based Werner Enterprises for Werner Park.

Cordaro led the process of the rebranding and renaming of the Omaha Triple-A franchise that included much research and fan-aided voting. Under his leadership, the organization has posted its highest total revenues on record during the past five seasons. During the 2015 season Cordaro and the organization hosted the First National Bank 2015 Triple-A All-Star Game.

== Awards and honors ==
Cordaro was honored as the inaugural recipient of the Omaha Sports Hall of Fame Community Service Award in 2015, was named the Sarpy County Chamber of Commerce Business Leader of the Year in 2014 and Baseball America Minor League Executive of the Year in 2013. In 20220, Cordaro was named the recipient of the George Brett Commitment to ALS.

The Pacific Coast League's executives nominated and voted Cordaro the 2011 PCL Executive of the Year, while Ballpark Digest honored both Cordaro and former team president Alan Stein the baseball industry's 2011 co-executives of the year. The Kansas City Royals honored Cordaro as their recipient of the Matt Minker Award in 2009, which recognizes an outstanding minor league affiliate employee. Cordaro in 2009 also was among the honorees for the Midlands Business Journal's "40 under 40" that recognizes entrepreneurs and business executives under the age of 40, and was a Suburban "Under 40" honoree in July 2011. In 2012, Cordaro was recognized by his high school alma mater Ruston High School as its Young Alumnus of the Year.

Throughout his tenure, the Storm Chasers franchise has also been recognized for numerous awards and honors throughout the industry. The organization was honored as the Pacific Coast League's nominee for the Larry MacPhail award in Minor League Baseball for the 2014 season. In 2013 and 2017, the team also was the nominee for MiLB's inaugural John Henry Moss Community Service award, given to a club "that demonstrates an outstanding, ongoing commitment to charitable service, support and leadership within their local community and within the baseball industry". The franchise has also been bestowed the Sarpy County Chamber of Commerce's business of the year twice, first in 2009 and again in 2015. In addition, the franchise was awarded with a Veeckie by ESPN The Magazine in 2008, 2009 and 2010, and has won Omaha Magazine's Best of Omaha Sports Team honor each of the last ten years.

== Civic engagement ==
Cordaro is an active member in many area chamber of commerce and business associations, and serves on the Regional Advisory Council of the ALS Association Mid-American chapter; was a director for Community Health Charities of Nebraska; is a member and is a trustee for Rotary Club of Omaha West; is a Boys Town Booster; and is also a member of the CHI Health Midlands Hospital Charitable Council, in addition to the Omaha Sports Commission board of directors. Cordaro also serves on Minor League Baseball and USL committees.
