= Ruston, Louisiana =

Ruston
- City
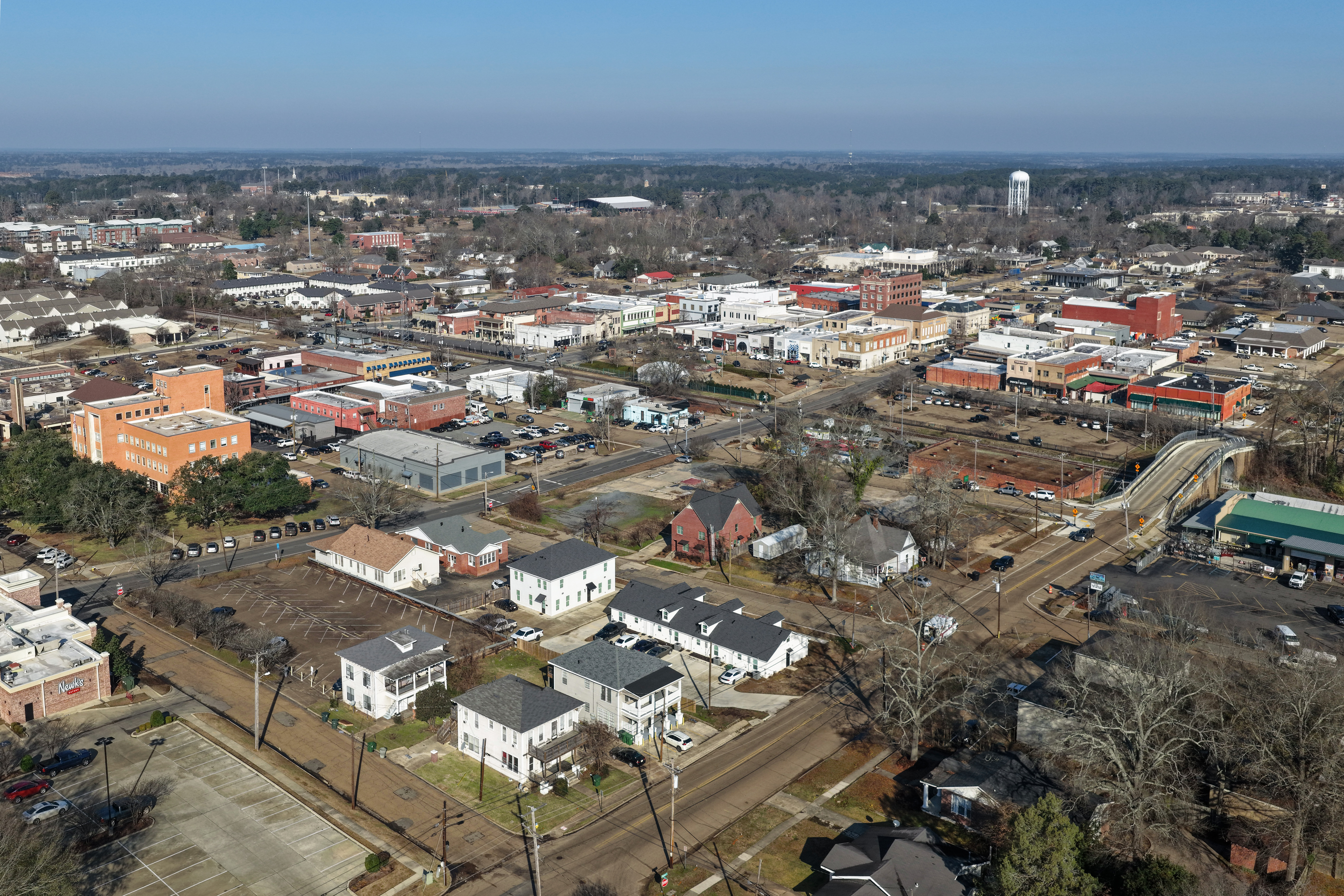
- Downtown Ruston
- Nicknames: Louisiana's College Town; The Peach City; Rus Vegas
- Location of Ruston in Lincoln Parish, Louisiana.

- Location within Louisiana Location within the United States
- Coordinates: 32°31′47″N 92°38′26″W
- Country: United States
- State: Louisiana
- Parish: Lincoln
- Incorporated: 1885 (141 years ago)
- Named for: Robert Edwin Russ

Government
  - Type: Mayor-Council
  - Mayor: Ronny Walker (R)

Area
  - Total: 21.25 sq mi (55.05 km^{2})
  - Land: 21.19 sq mi (54.88 km^{2})
  - Water: 0.069 sq mi (0.18 km^{2})
- Elevation: 312 ft (95 m)

Population (2020)
  - Total: 22,166
  - Density: 1,046.1/sq mi (403.92/km^{2})
- Demonym(s): Rustonian, Rustonite
- Time zone: UTC-6 (CST)
  - Summer (DST): UTC-5 (CDT)
- ZIP code: 71270, 71272, 71273
- Area code: 318
- Airport: Ruston Regional Airport
- FIPS code: 22-66655
- GNIS feature ID: 2404660
- Website: ruston.org

Ruston is a city in and the parish seat of Lincoln Parish, Louisiana, United States. The 2020 population was 22,166. Ruston is near the eastern border of the Ark-La-Tex region and is the home of Louisiana Tech University. Ruston is the principal city of the Ruston micropolitan statistical area, which includes all of Lincoln Parish.

== History ==
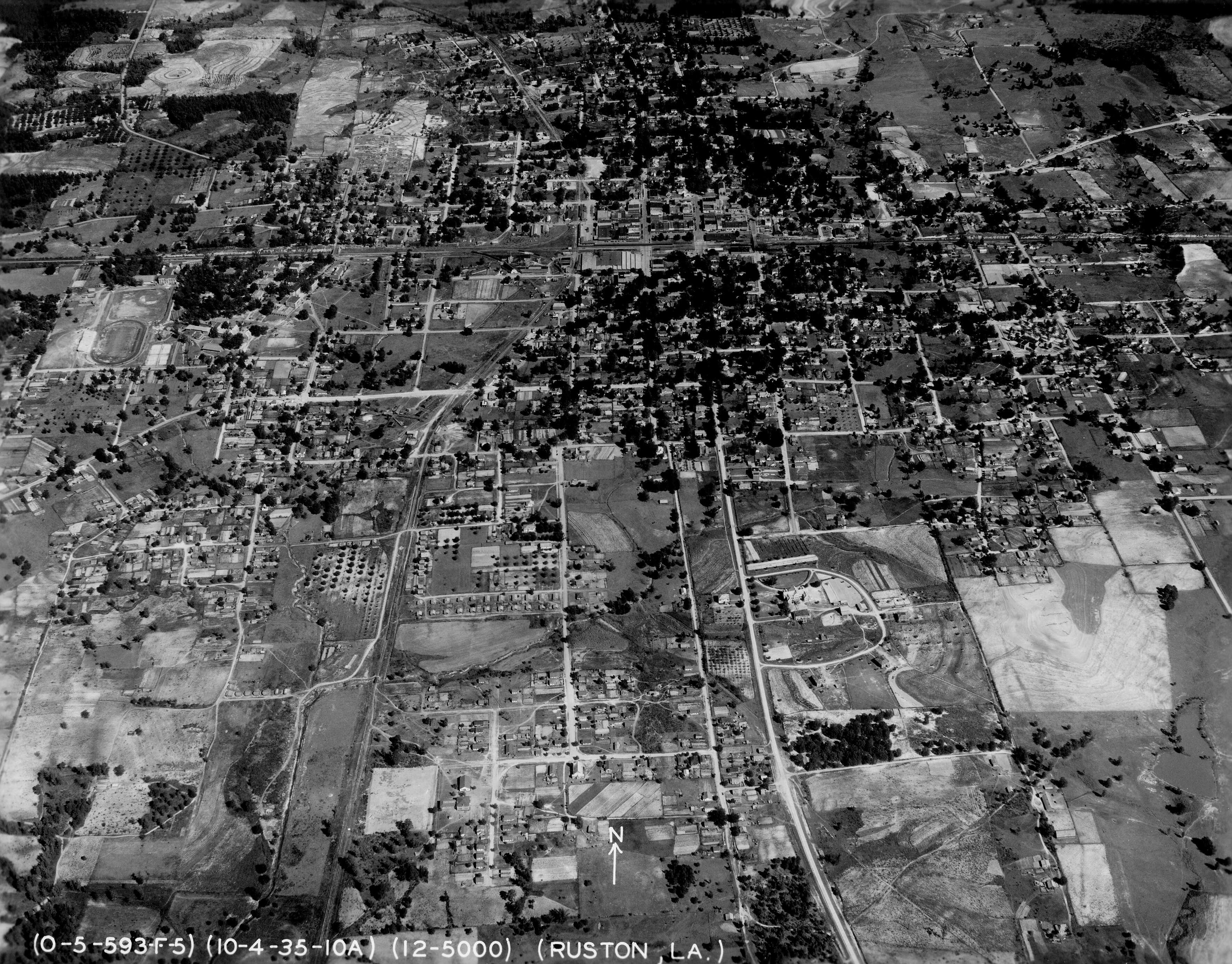
Ruston in 1935

During the Reconstruction Era following the Civil War, word soon reached the young parish near what is now Ruston, that the Vicksburg, Shreveport, and Pacific Railroad would begin to run across north Louisiana, linking the Deep South with the West (the current operator is Canadian Pacific Kansas City). Robert Edwin Russ, the Lincoln Parish sheriff from 1877–1880, donated 640 acres (2.6 km^{2}) to the town and the area was eventually known as Ruston in his honor.

In 1883, commercial and residential lots were created and sold for $375 apiece; and soon the sawing of lumber and clacking of hammers could be heard throughout the area.

Vienna was the parish seat of Lincoln Parish from its creation in 1873 until 1884, when a parish-wide vote moved it to the new town of Ruston.

As the town began to take shape, new churches, businesses, civic organizations and schools were being established. Cotton farming fueled the economy. In 1900 a second railroad, running north and south, was built through Ruston (the operator before the tracks were removed was Chicago, Rock Island and Pacific Railroad). This brought even more business and industry to the area and the population continued to provide a foundation for the local economy. By the time the U.S. entered World War I in 1917, Ruston was established as a center for learning, a place of civic pride, and as an area of economic prosperity throughout the region.

In 1938 Ruston received national attention when an African-American teenager named R.C. Williams was lynched in one of the most brutal attacks of its type in many years. The 19 year old Williams was accused by a mob of vigilantes of killing a white man and assaulting a white woman, although it was later determined to be highly unlikely that Williams was guilty of these, or any other crimes. The vigilantes captured Williams and after torturing him with red-hot pokers (castration was also suspected) and shooting him numerous times, he was hung from a tree. Although a local sheriff tried to stop the mob, they then threatened the sheriff's life, and the lynching continued. A grand jury of all white men later cleared all of the perpetrators of any wrongdoing. The crime had a significant and long lasting impact on state and national politics, and can be directly related to the rise of segregationist demagoguery in the south.

Ruston grew steadily during the post-World War II years. The GI Bill of Rights sent war veterans to college, helped to fuel the local economy, brought growth to the two local universities, Louisiana Tech University and nearby historically black Grambling State University, and new families moved into Lincoln Parish. By the middle 1960s, Interstate 20 passed through the northern part of Ruston. This major interstate highway made Ruston more easily accessible, much as the railroad had done a century earlier. In the 1980s, the state of Louisiana economy declined as the oil industry went into a recession.

Ruston, however, continued growing steadily because of the rapid expansion of Louisiana Tech. The city also had its centennial celebration during this decade, and emphasis was placed on revitalizing the historic downtown district. A joint effort between the city and the Louisiana Main Street Program and the Louisiana Department of Historic Preservation brought forth beautification projects to rehabilitate the downtown district, and helped draw the community closer to its roots. More than fifteen buildings have been placed on the National Register of Historic Places.

The city has a new general aviation airport to serve existing business and industry, and the timber, poultry and cattle industries continue to expand.

The Arkansas Southern Railroad Company (ASRR), that became the Chicago, Rock Island and Pacific Railway (CRI&P), built a station named Chautauqua, north of Ruston that became part of the town.

In 2019, the community was struck by an EF3 tornado.

== Geography ==
According to the United States Census Bureau, the city has a total area of 18.2 square miles (47 km^{2}), of which 18.1 square miles (47 km^{2}) is land and 0.1 square miles (0.26 km^{2}) (0.44%) is water.

=== Climate ===
Climate data for Ruston, Louisiana (Louisiana Tech University) (1991–2020 normals, extremes 1895–2020)
Month	Jan	Feb	Mar	Apr	May	Jun	Jul	Aug	Sep	Oct	Nov	Dec	Year
Record high °F (°C)	65 (18)	88 (31)	95 (35)	96 (36)	102 (39)	107 (42)	108 (42)	109 (43)	108 (42)	100 (38)	95 (35)	87 (31)	109 (43)
Mean daily maximum °F (°C)	57.3 (14.1)	61.1 (16.2)	68.9 (20.5)	76.4 (24.7)	82.9 (28.3)	89.4 (31.9)	92.2 (33.4)	92.6 (33.7)	87.8 (31.0)	78.1 (25.6)	67.5 (19.7)	58.3 (14.6)	76.0 (24.4)
Daily mean °F (°C)	46.1 (7.8)	49.9 (9.9)	57.1 (13.9)	64.2 (17.9)	72.1 (22.3)	79.2 (26.2)	82.0 (27.8)	81.8 (27.7)	76.4 (24.7)	65.5 (18.6)	55.6 (13.1)	47.9 (8.8)	64.8 (18.2)
Mean daily minimum °F (°C)	35.0 (1.7)	38.6 (3.7)	45.2 (7.3)	52.1 (11.2)	61.3 (16.3)	68.9 (20.5)	71.8 (22.1)	71.0 (21.7)	65.0 (18.3)	53.0 (11.7)	43.8 (6.6)	37.5 (3.1)	53.6 (12.0)
Record low °F (°C)	−4 (−20)	−3 (−19)	14 (−10)	28 (−2)	35 (2)	46 (8)	55 (13)	49 (9)	37 (3)	25 (−4)	12 (−11)	0 (−18)	−4 (−20)
Average precipitation inches (mm)	5.55 (141)	5.24 (133)	5.38 (137)	5.51 (140)	4.35 (110)	3.85 (98)	3.61 (92)	3.81 (97)	3.80 (97)	4.79 (122)	4.27 (108)	5.45 (138)	55.61 (1,412)
Average snowfall inches (cm)	0.2 (0.51)	0.2 (0.51)	0.0 (0.0)	0.0 (0.0)	0.0 (0.0)	0.0 (0.0)	0.0 (0.0)	0.0 (0.0)	0.0 (0.0)	0.0 (0.0)	0.0 (0.0)	0.0 (0.0)	0.4 (1.0)
Average precipitation days (≥ 0.01 in)	10.7	9.6	9.8	7.7	8.3	8.5	8.7	7.9	6.8	8.0	8.6	10.0	104.6
Average snowy days (≥ 0.1 in)	0.0	0.1	0.0	0.0	0.0	0.0	0.0	0.0	0.0	0.0	0.0	0.1	0.2
Source: NOAA

== Demographics ==
Historical population
Census	Pop.	Note	%±
1890	767		—
1900	1,324		72.6%
1910	3,377		155.1%
1920	3,389		0.4%
1930	4,400		29.8%
1940	7,107		61.5%
1950	10,372		45.9%
1960	13,991		34.9%
1970	17,365		24.1%
1980	20,585		18.5%
1990	20,027		−2.7%
2000	20,546		2.6%
2010	21,859		6.4%
2020	22,166		1.4%
2025 (est.)	22,397	▲	1.0%
U.S. Decennial Census

=== Racial and ethnic composition ===
Ruston racial composition as of 2020
Race	Number	Percentage
White (non-Hispanic)	11,201	50.53%
Black or African American (non-Hispanic)	8,867	40.0%
Native American	86	0.39%
Asian	551	2.49%
Pacific Islander	5	0.02%
Other/Mixed	693	3.13%
Hispanic or Latino	763	3.44%

=== 2020 census ===
As of the 2020 census, Ruston had a population of 22,166 and 3,938 families. The median age was 25.0 years. 18.6% of residents were under the age of 18 and 12.6% of residents were 65 years of age or older. For every 100 females there were 92.6 males, and for every 100 females age 18 and over there were 90.7 males age 18 and over.

97.6% of residents lived in urban areas, while 2.4% lived in rural areas.

There were 8,604 households in Ruston, of which 25.3% had children under the age of 18 living in them. Of all households, 26.8% were married-couple households, 24.8% were households with a male householder and no spouse or partner present, and 42.2% were households with a female householder and no spouse or partner present. About 34.7% of all households were made up of individuals and 11.0% had someone living alone who was 65 years of age or older.

There were 9,669 housing units, of which 11.0% were vacant. The homeowner vacancy rate was 2.0% and the rental vacancy rate was 10.3%.

Racial composition as of the 2020 census
Race	Number	Percent
White	11,416	51.5%
Black or African American	8,925	40.3%
American Indian and Alaska Native	105	0.5%
Asian	554	2.5%
Native Hawaiian and Other Pacific Islander	5	0.0%
Some other race	275	1.2%
Two or more races	886	4.0%
Hispanic or Latino (of any race)	763	3.4%

=== 2010 census ===
According to the 2010 census, there were 21,859 people in the city.

=== 2000 census ===
According to the 2000 census, there were 20,546 people, 7,621 households, and 4,244 families residing in the city, with a population density of 1,136.4 people per square mile (438.8/km^{2}). The racial makeup of the city was 56.94% White, 38.92% African American, 0.17% Native American, 2.41% Asian, 0.02% Pacific Islander, 0.63% from other races, and 0.90% from two or more races. Hispanic or Latino of any race were 1.29% of the population.

=== Income ===
According to the 2000 census, the median income for a household in the city was $23,001, and the median income for a family was $37,394. Males had a median income of $33,408 versus $20,413 for females. The per capita income for the city was $14,573. About 22.1% of families and 32.1% of the population were below the poverty line, including 34.1% of those under age 18 and 17.6% of those age 65 or over. At the publication of the 2020 census, the median household income grew to $34,554.

== Arts and culture ==
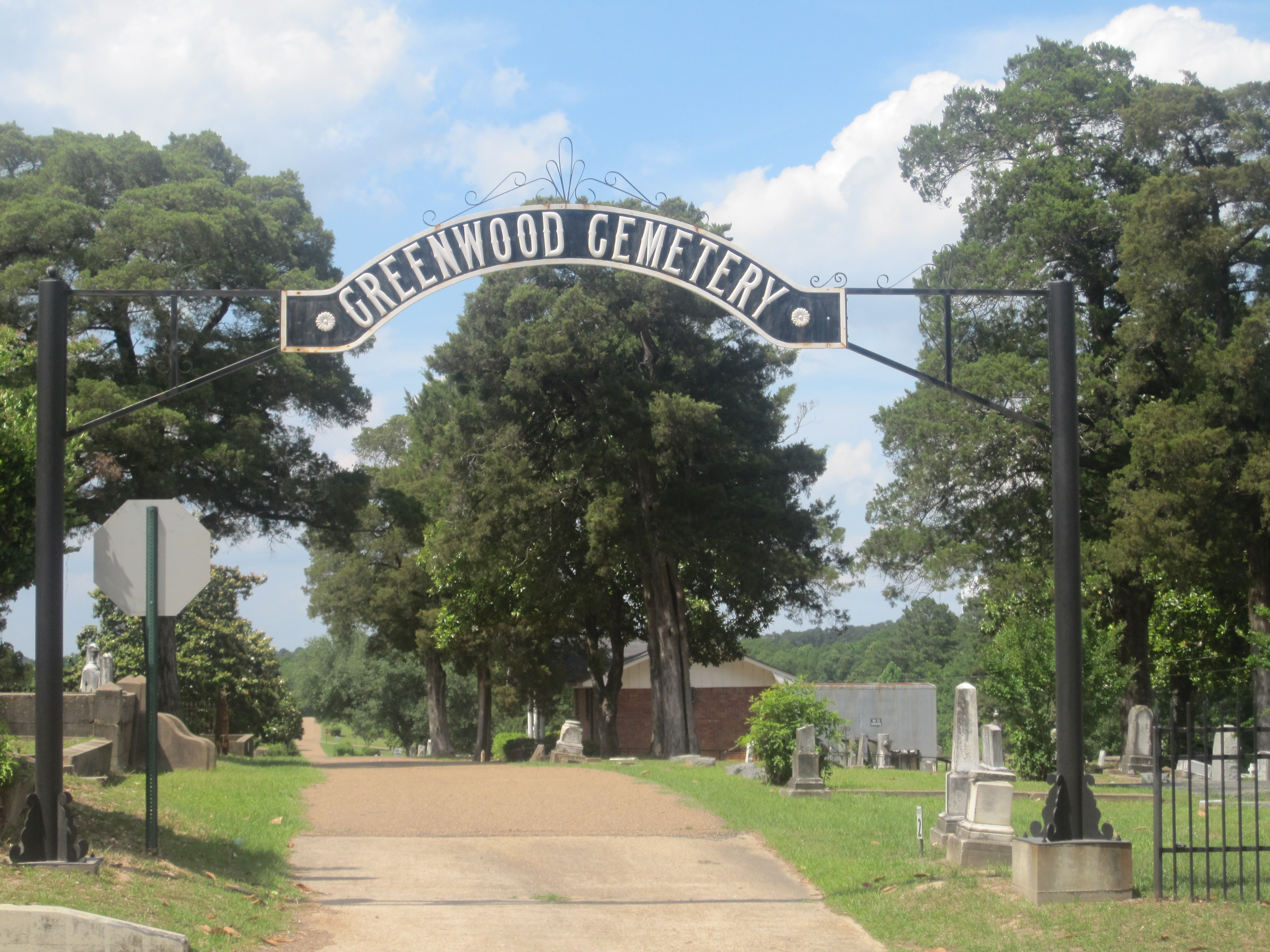
Greenwood Cemetery in Ruston has graves from the American Civil War era. Notable interments include Robert Edwin Russ, founder of Ruston, and publisher Clarence Faulk.

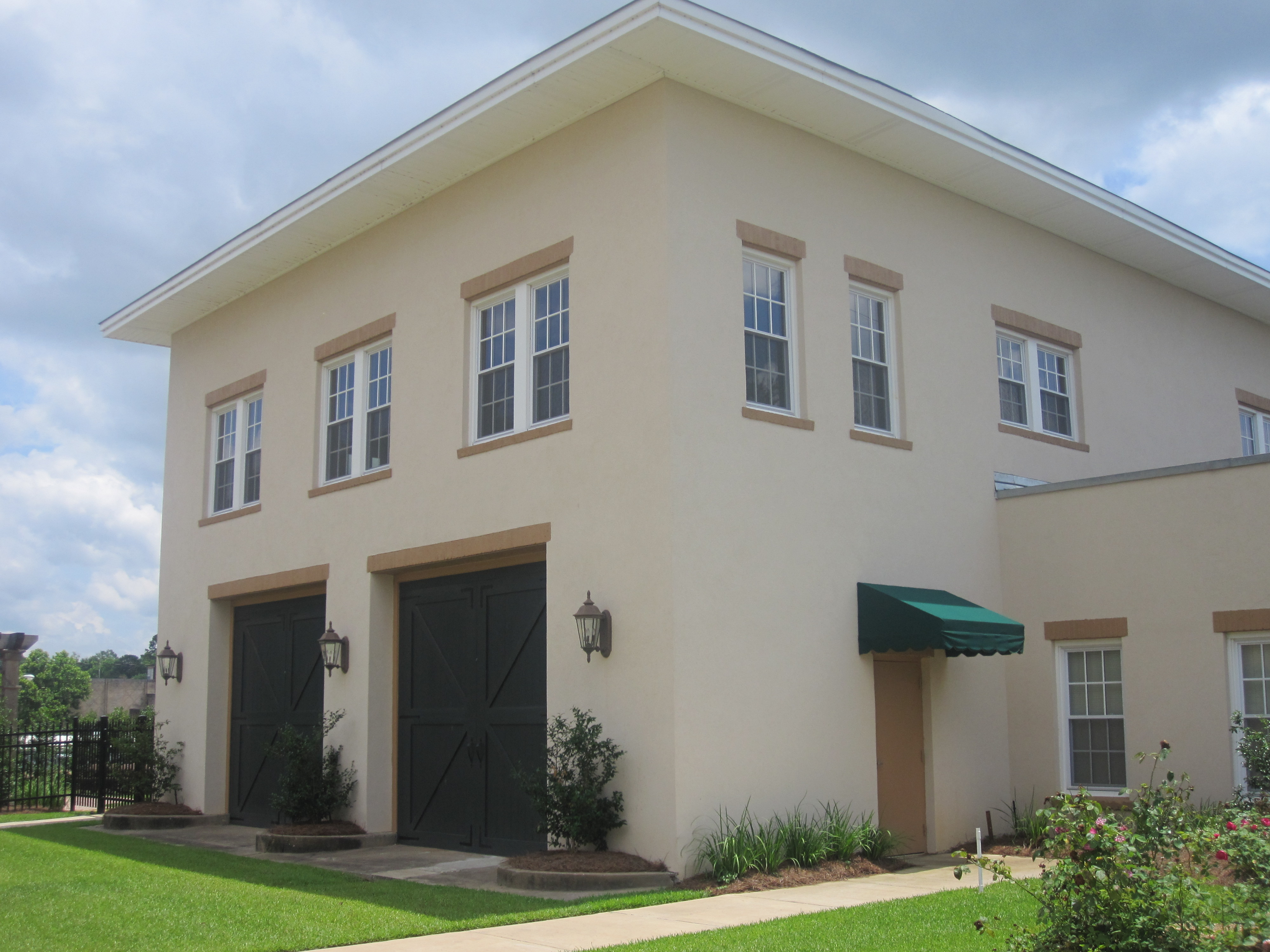
Restored historic fire station in downtown Ruston

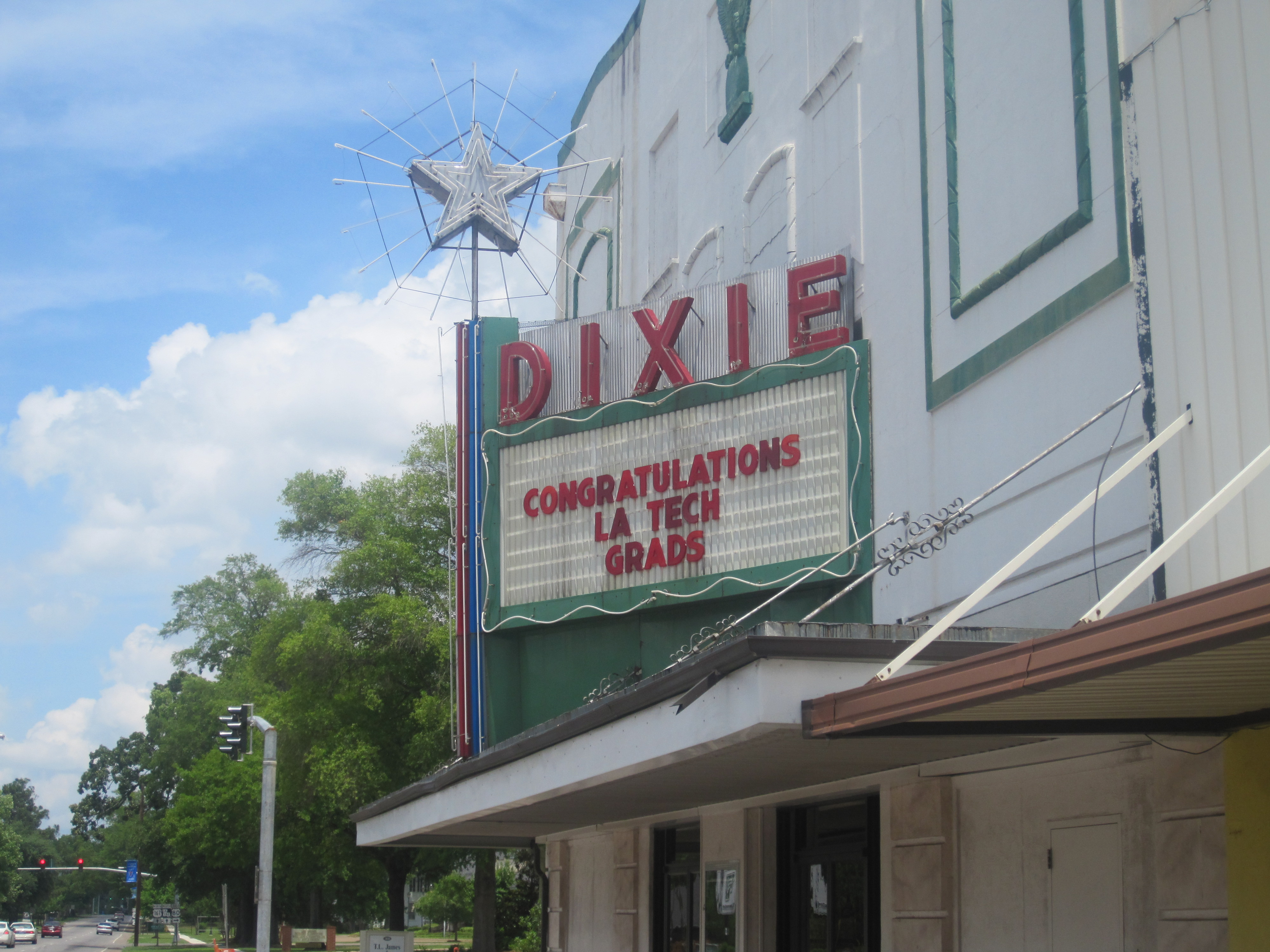
Dixie Theater in downtown Ruston

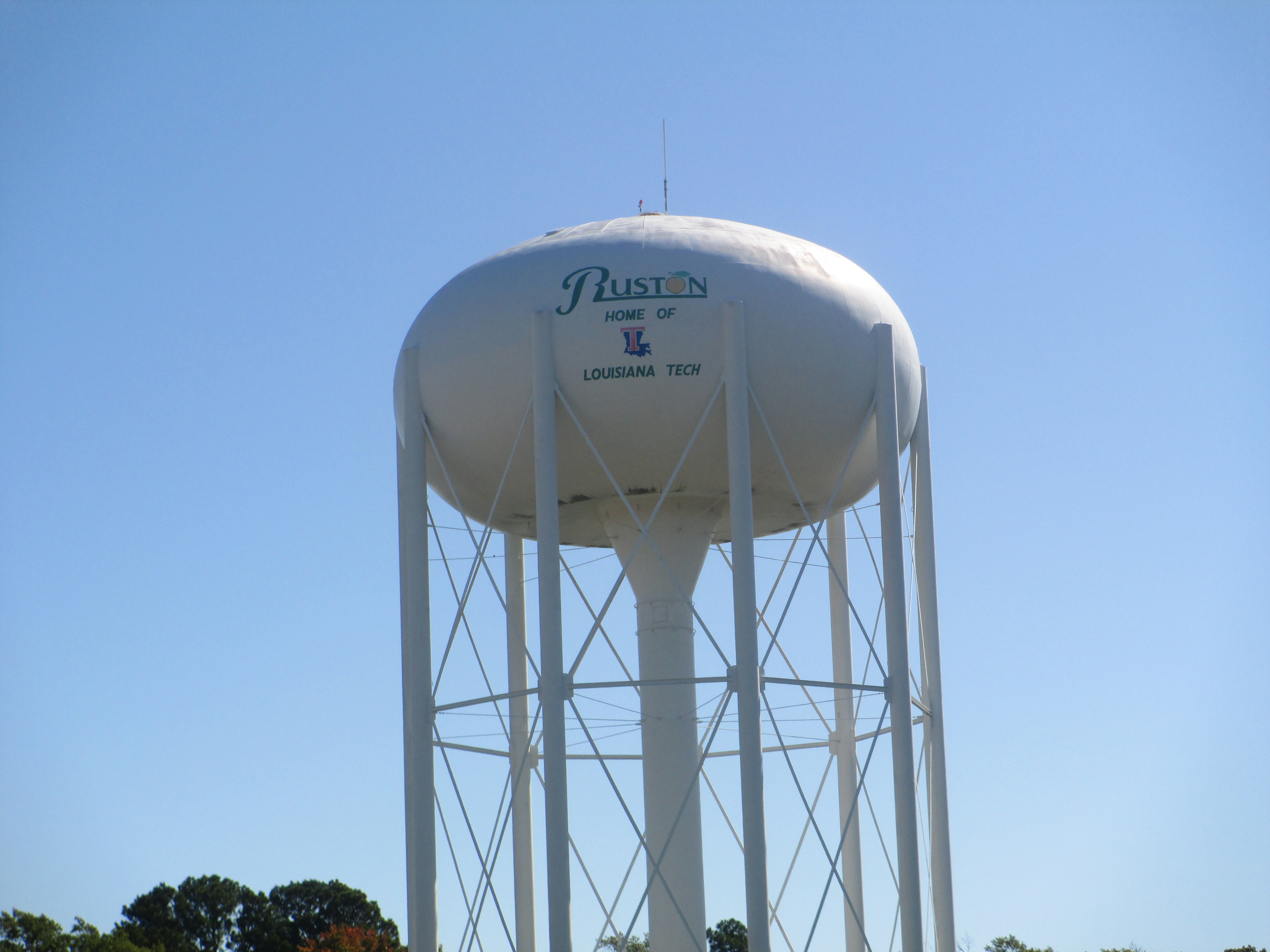
Ruston water tower off Interstate 20

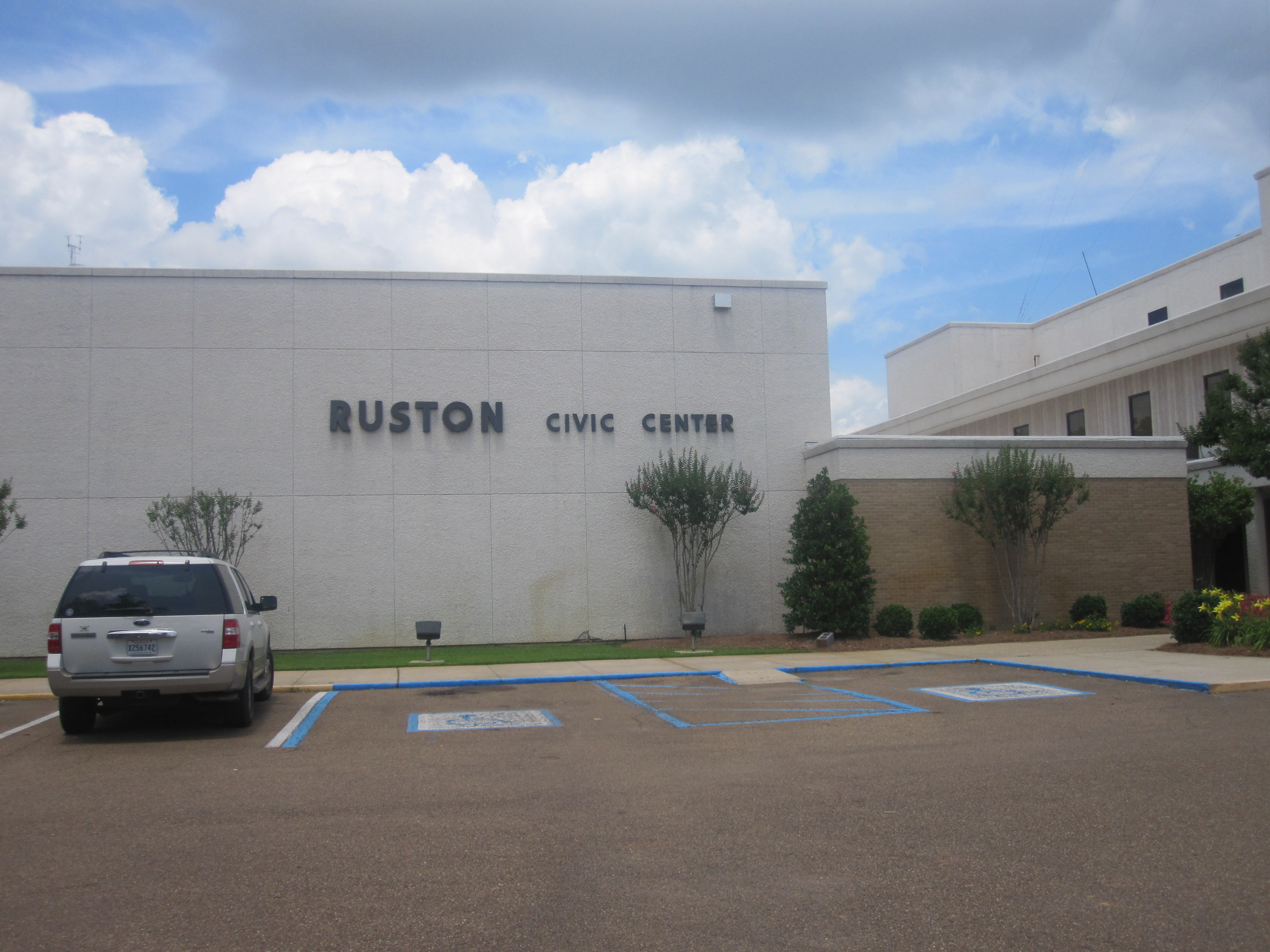
Ruston Civic Center

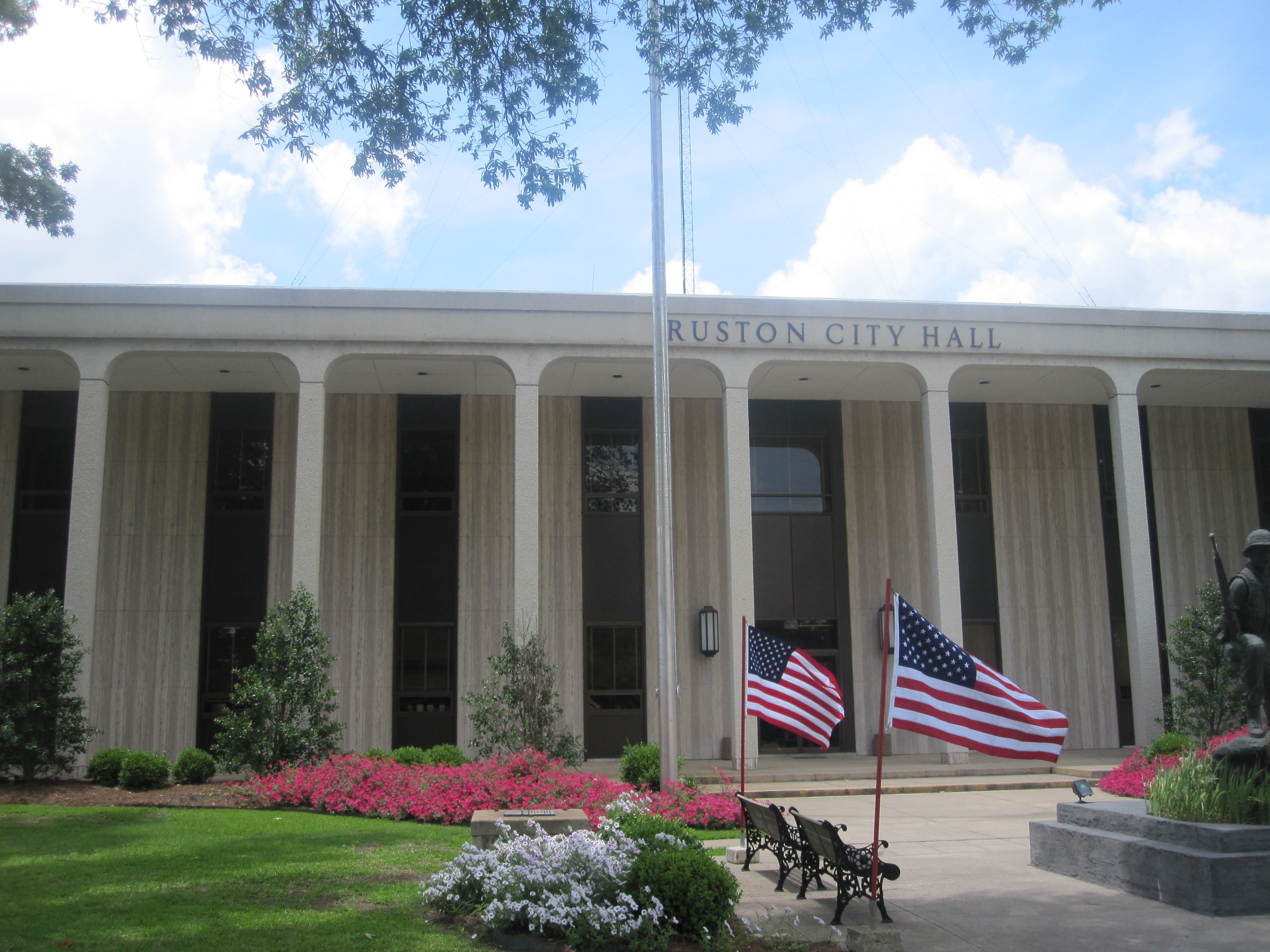
Ruston City Hall

Most cultural activities are offered through Louisiana Tech. Also there are shops downtown, chain restaurants in the city, and an eight-screen Celebrity Theater. Other university-based opportunities exist at Grambling (6 miles from Ruston) and Monroe (35 miles away). The Louisiana Tech University Arboretum interests many visitors.

Early in 2007, the city initiated a blueprint for future growth and development of the Ruston area. Known as "Ruston 21", the plan will evaluate the assets of the community and the ways to achieve goals. It will look citywide at residential development and neighborhoods, recreation planning, transportation issues, economic development, infrastructure concerns, quality of life, and working collaboratively with Louisiana Tech University.

Opened in 1928, the historic Dixie Theater serves as the visual and performing arts hub of Ruston as it houses the North Central Louisiana Arts Council, Piney Hills Gallery, Ruston Community Theatre, Ruston Civic Symphony Society, Troupe Dixie, independent film screenings, dance recitals, and music concerts. Celebrity Theatres, an eight-screen movie theater with digital projection and sound with 3D capabilities and stadium seating in all auditoriums, opened in Ruston in 2006. On campus at Louisiana Tech, Howard Auditorium and Stone Theatre serve as the university's home for the performing arts, and Louisiana Tech is home to two visual art galleries including the E. J. Bellocq Gallery and the Louisiana Tech Art Gallery.

The Louisiana Military Museum features uniforms, weapons, flags, training gear, aircraft, and vehicles from nearly every conflict in United States history. Built in 1886, the Kidd-Davis house is home to the Lincoln Parish Museum, which exhibits early Ruston history. Located on Louisiana Tech's main campus, The Idea Place Math and Science Discovery Center offers many interactive science exhibits including a planetarium.

Ruston is located in the heart of North Louisiana, known as the Sportsman's Paradise, where outdoor activities like hunting and fishing are popular for residents. Located on the Louisiana Tech campus, Garland Gregory Hideaway Park has a seven-acre lake for fishing and canoeing, walking/running trails, pavilions, grills, ropes course, and an 18-hole frisbee golf course. The North Louisiana Exhibition Center hosts rodeos, barrel races, horse and livestock shows, roping events, and antique car and tractor shows in Ruston.

As home to the Louisiana Tech Bulldogs and Lady Techsters of Conference USA, Ruston is a scene of major college sports. The Louisiana Tech Bulldogs football team plays at Joe Aillet Stadium and has won three national championships, won 25 conference championships, and played in 24 postseason games including nine major college bowl games. The Louisiana Tech Bulldogs basketball and Louisiana Tech Lady Techsters basketball teams play their games at the Thomas Assembly Center. The Dunkin' Dawgs have won 25 regular season conference championships, made seven NCAA Tournament appearances including one Sweet Sixteen, and nine NIT appearances. The Lady Techsters have won three national championships and 20 regular season conference championships; have competed in 13 Final Fours, 23 Sweet Sixteens, and 27 NCAA Tournaments; and have the second most wins all-time of any women's college basketball program. The Louisiana Tech Bulldogs baseball team plays at J. C. Love Field at Pat Patterson Park, has won 21 regular season conference championships, and has participated in eight NCAA Tournaments.

=== Peach Festival ===
Each June, Ruston hosts its annual Peach Festival, sponsored by the Squire Creek Country Club.

Until the 1940s, most area peach farming had been done on a small-scale family basis. In 1947, area peach growers organized the Louisiana Fruit Growers Association and held the first festival four years later on June 27–28, 1951. On that occasion, Justin Wilson, the popular south Louisiana chef and Cajun humorist entertained the audience at Howard Auditorium on the Louisiana Tech campus. Then State Senator Dudley J. LeBlanc of Abbeville in Vermilion Parish, the promoter of the patent medicine known as Hadacol, was invited to crown the first Peach Festival Queen, Ann Colvin of Bernice in Union Parish.

The festival sponsors races of 5K and 1M and a tennis tournament played on the Louisiana Tech courts.

=== Railroad Fest ===
Railroad Fest is an annual makers, music, and culture festival held in Downtown Ruston each April since 2017. The Makers Fair is held at the Historic Ruston Fire Station, and live music is performed at the amphitheater at Railroad Park.

== Education ==
=== Primary and secondary education ===
Public schools are part of the Lincoln Parish School System. Eight of the twelve Lincoln Parish Schools are located in Ruston. Lincoln Parish Early Childhood Center operates the parish's preschool program in Ruston. Glen View Elementary School and Hillcrest Elementary School teach kindergarten through the second grade. Cypress Springs Elementary School and Ruston Elementary School teach third grade through fifth grade. I. A. Lewis School teaches only sixth grade, and Ruston Junior High School teaches seventh and eighth grades. Ruston High School teaches ninth through twelfth grades.

Located on Louisiana Tech's campus in Ruston, A. E. Phillips Laboratory School offers kindergarten through eighth grade.

Ruston is home to a few private schools. Cedar Creek School and Bethel Christian School are college preparatory schools that offer preschool through twelfth grade. New Living Word School also offers preschool through twelfth grade. Montessori School of Ruston offers preschool through eighth grade.

Lorraine Nobles Howard Education Center, known as Howard School, is an alternative school for the residents of the Louisiana Methodist Children's Home in Ruston.

=== Higher education ===
Louisiana Tech University, a national research university, dominates the city of Ruston, providing the city with its distinctive college town character. Grambling State University is located in nearby Grambling, only four miles west of the Louisiana Tech campus. Additionally, Louisiana Delta Community College has a branch campus located in Ruston.

== Media ==
The Ruston Daily Leader is the newspaper serving Ruston and the rest of Lincoln Parish since 1894. The Daily Leader is published Sunday morning and Monday through Friday afternoons. Louisiana Tech University is served by several publications including The Tech Talk, the independent Louisiana Tech student newspaper that reports on local, state, and national issues in addition to campus news.

=== Radio ===
Ruston is the principal city of the Ruston media market for radio.

=== Television ===
Ruston is part of the Monroe media market for television.

== Infrastructure ==
=== National Guard ===
The 527th Engineer Battalion (Triple Alpha) ("Anything, Anytime, Anywhere") is headquartered in Ruston. This battalion is part of the 225th Engineer Brigade of the Louisiana National Guard.

=== Health care ===
- Green Clinic
- Northern Louisiana Medical Center
- Ruston Regional Specialty Center

=== Law Enforcement ===
- Lincoln Parish Sheriff's Office
- Louisiana State Police
- Ruston Police Department

=== Light & Power ===
City of Ruston has its own electric power and street lighting.

== Notable people ==
- Trace Adkins, country singer who attended Louisiana Tech
- George Ballas, inventor of the string trimmer, born in Ruston.
- Leon Barmore, Hall of Fame NCAA basketball coach, played basketball at Ruston High School
- Mary Black (activist), community activist and social worker
- George W. Bond, president of Louisiana Tech University from 1929 to 1936
- Terry Bradshaw, member of the Pro Football Hall of Fame, attended Louisiana Tech
- Kix Brooks, country music singer, who attended Louisiana Tech.
- P.J. Brown, retired NBA player, attended Louisiana Tech
- Mary Elizabeth Talbot Busbee, the First Lady of Georgia from 1975 to 1983, was born and reared in Ruston.
- John R. Conniff, educator, president of Louisiana Tech from 1926 to 1928
- Martie Cordaro, president and general manager of the Omaha Storm Chasers baseball club
- Dean Dablow, Photographer, Professor at Louisiana Tech
- Fred Dean, NFL Hall of Famer, attended Ruston High
- Jonathan Donehoo, Professor Emeritus and Director of the School of Art, Louisiana Tech from 2007 to 2014
- Clarence Faulk, newspaper publisher, radio broadcaster, businessman
- Tim Floyd, NCAA and NBA basketball coach, attended Louisiana Tech
- Vic Frazier, MLB pitcher during the 1930s
- W. C. Friley, founder of Ruston College in the late 1880s, a forerunner of Louisiana Tech
- Ralph Garr, Baseball player and member of the Atlanta Braves Hall of Fame
- Andy Hamilton, NFL player
- Aaron Holiday, NBA player for the Houston Rockets
- Will Cullen Hart, indie rock musician, visual artist
- Sonja Hogg, founding coach of the Louisiana Tech Lady Techsters
- Bert Jones, former NFL quarterback, attended Ruston High School
- Dub Jones, former NFL halfback, attended Ruston High School
- Karl Malone, Basketball Hall of Famer, attended Louisiana Tech
- Jeff Mangum, indie rock musician, attended Ruston High School
- Monica Maxwell, former WNBA player, played in two Final Fours for the Lady Techsters
- Luke McCown, former NFL quarterback, attended Louisiana Tech
- Garnie W. McGinty, Louisiana historian
- Alice Cary McKinney, President, Louisiana State Woman's Christian Temperance Union
- Paul Millsap, retired NBA player, attended Louisiana Tech
- Ryan Moats, athlete, attended Louisiana Tech
- Kim Mulkey, head women's basketball coach of LSU Tigers
- Virgil Orr, former state representative; Louisiana Tech vice president
- Joe Raymond Peace, former football coach of Louisiana Tech Bulldogs
- Edwin Pinkston, Artist, Professor at Louisiana Tech
- Arthur T. Prescott, educator and president of Louisiana Tech University
- Patrick Ramsey, former NFL quarterback, attended Ruston High School
- Willie Roaf, NFL Hall of Fame player, attended Louisiana Tech
- Kramer Robertson, current MLB player for St. Louis Cardinals
- Phil Robertson, hunter and reality TV star who attended Louisiana Tech
- Scotty Robertson, high school, college, and professional basketball coach
- W. C. Robinson, mathematics professor and president of Louisiana Tech
- Robert Schneider, Indie rock musician, member of the Elephant Six Collective
- Josh Scobee, current NFL player, attended Louisiana Tech
- John Simoneaux, blues singer, songwriter, and guitarist, graduate of LA Tech
- Mickey Slaughter, former NFL quarterback and later coached for Louisiana Tech
- Polly Smith, photographer
- George Stone, former National League pitcher
- Scotty Thurman, former basketball player, attended Ruston High School
- A. L. Williams, retired football coach
- Kyle Williams, former NFL player, attended Ruston High School
- Clint Williamson, US Ambassador and White House policy official
- John D. Winters, historian of the American Civil War
- Kenny Wright, former NFL defensive back
- Prof Sister Natalia Zotov, cosmologist specializing in gravity waves

== In popular culture ==
- The longstanding Dixie Theater in Ruston is featured in a 1999 article in the publication North Louisiana History.
- Social media personality Logan Paul acted as "mayor" of Ruston for two days for his online streaming show Logan Paul VS...
