= List of Alpha Phi Gamma (honor society) chapters =

Alpha Phi Gamma was a journalist honor society that merged into the Society for Collegiate Journalists (SCJ) in 1975. In the following list of chapters, active chapters are indicated in bold and inactive chapters are in italics.

Chapter	Charter date and range	Institution	Location	Status	Ref.
Alpha	December 1919 – before 1962; 19xx?–1975	Ohio Northern University	Ada, Ohio	Merged (SCJ)	(Note: This chapter became part of the Society for Collegiate Journalists as part of a national merger.)
Beta	1923–1937	University of Akron	Akron, Ohio	Inactive	
Gamma	1923–1975	Wilmington College	Wilmington, Ohio	Merged (SCJ)	
Delta	1923–before 1962	Baldwin-Wallace College	Berea, Ohio	Inactive	
Epsilon	1923–before 1962; 19xx–1975	Muskingum College	New Concord, Ohio	Merged (SCJ)	
Zeta	1923–1923	Hiram College	Hiram, Ohio	Inactive	(Note: never initiated members)
Eta	1923–19xx ?; 1931–1975	University of Toledo	Toledo, Ohio	Merged (SCJ)	(Note: Did not initiate members until 1931)
Theta	1926–before 1933	Cotner College	Lincoln, Nebraska	Inactive	(Note: The college closed in 1933.)
Iota	1927–1940	Louisiana State Normal College	Natchitoches, Louisiana	Inactive	
Kappa	1928–before 1962	New York State Teachers College at Albany	Albany, New York	Inactive	
Lambda	1928–1975	University of Redlands	Redlands, California	Merged (SCJ)	(Note: Formed from the Alpha chapter of Omega Xi Alpha during the national merger of the two fraternities in 1929. Its original charter date of 1928 was retained.)
Mu (See Gamma Lambda)	1928–1929	California Institute of Technology	Pasadena, California	Inactive	(Note: Formed from the Beta chapter of Omega Xi Alpha during the national merger of the two fraternities in 1929. Its original charter date of 1928 was retained.) (Note: No members initiated, new letters (Gamma Lambda) given when restarted)
Nu	1928–before 1962	Southwestern University	Los Angeles	Inactive	(Note: Formed from the Gamma chapter of Omega Xi Alpha during the national merger of the two fraternities in 1929. Its original charter date of 1928 was retained.)
Xi	1928–1929	Whittier College	Whittier, California	Inactive	(Note: Formed from the Delta chapter of Omega Xi Alpha during the national merger of the two fraternities in 1929. Its original charter date of 1928 was retained.) (Note: never initiated members)
Omicron	1928–before 1962	State College of Fresno	Fresno, California	Inactive	(Note: Formed from the Epsilon chapter of Omega Xi Alpha during the national merger of the two fraternities in 1929. Its original charter date of 1928 was retained.)
Pi	1928–19xx ?; March 11, 1948 – before 1962	Santa Barbara State Teacher's College	Santa Barbara County, California	Inactive	(Note: Formed from the Eta chapter of Omega Xi Alpha during the national merger of the two fraternities in 1929. Its original charter date of 1928 was retained.)
Rho	1928–1975	Hanover College	Hanover, Indiana	Merged (SCJ)	
Sigma	1928–1941	State Teachers College at Indiana	Indiana, Pennsylvania	Inactive	
Tau	1928–before 1962	Albion College	Albion, Michigan	Inactive	
Upsilon	1928-before 1933	North Carolina State College	Raleigh, North Carolina	Inactive	
Phi	1929–before 1933	St. Stephens' College	Red Hook, New York	Inactive	
Chi	1929–before 1933	Georgetown College	Georgetown, Kentucky	Inactive	
Psi	February 1931–1936	College of Puget Sound	Tacoma, Washington	Inactive	(Note: Chapter formed from Iota Tau, a local honorary established in 1927.)
Omega	1931–1975	Ball State Teacher's College	Muncie, Indiana	Merged (SCJ)	
Alpha Alpha				Unassigned	
Alpha Beta	1931–1937	Gustavus Adolphus College	St. Peter, Minnesota	Inactive	(Note: Chapter formed from Iota Chi Sigma)
Alpha Gamma	1931	San Francisco State Teacher's College	San Francisco, California	Inactive	
Alpha Delta	1933–before 1962	University of the Pacific	Stockton, California	Inactive	
Alpha Epsilon	1936–1938	Chapman College	Orange, California	Inactive	
Alpha Zeta	1937–before 1962	North Dakota Agricultural College	Fargo, North Dakota	Inactive	
Alpha Eta	1937	Concordia College	Moorhead, Minnesota	Inactive	
Alpha Theta	1937–1938	Hastings College	Hastings, Nebraska	Inactive	
Alpha Iota (see Beta Tau)	1938–1946	Franklin College	Franklin, Indiana	Inactive	
Alpha Kappa	1938–1975	Indiana State University	Terre Haute, Indiana	Merged (SCJ)	
Alpha Lambda	1945–before 1962	Occidental College	Los Angeles, California	Inactive	
Alpha Mu	1946–before 1962	Moorhead State College	Moorhead, Minnesota	Inactive	
Alpha Nu	1947–before 1962	New Mexico College of Agriculture and Mechanic Arts	Las Cruces, New Mexico	Inactive	
Alpha Xi				Unassigned	
Alpha Omicron				Unassigned	
Alpha Pi				Unassigned	
Alpha Rho				Unassigned	
Alpha Sigma				Unassigned	
Alpha Tau				Unassigned	
Alpha Upsilon				Unassigned	
Alpha Phi	1948–before 1962	Texas Western College	El Paso, Texas	Inactive	
Alpha Chi				Unassigned	
Alpha Psi	1948–before 1962	Jamestown College	Jamestown, North Dakota	Inactive	
Alpha Omega	1948–1975	Northern Iowa University	Cedar Falls, Iowa	Merged (SCJ)	
Beta Alpha	1948–1975	Oakland City College	Oakland City, Indiana	Merged (SCJ)	
Beta Beta	1948–before 1962	Western Michigan College	Kalamazoo, Michigan	Inactive	
Beta Gamma	1949–before 1962	Fairmont State College	Fairmont, West Virginia	Inactive	
Beta Delta	1949–1975	Wartburg College	Waverly, Iowa	Merged (SCJ)	
Beta Epsilon	1949	Mayville State Teacher's College	Mayville, North Dakota	Inactive	
Beta Zeta	1949	Valley City State College	Valley City, North Dakota	Inactive	
Beta Eta	1953	California State College, Long Beach	Long Beach, California	Inactive	
Beta Theta	1954	Sacramento State College	Sacramento, California	Inactive	
Beta Iota	1954	California State College, Los Angeles	Los Angeles, California	Inactive	
Beta Kappa	1954–1954	San Diego State College	San Diego, California	Inactive	
Beta Lambda	1955	Arizona State College at Flagstaff	Flagstaff, Arizona	Inactive	
Beta Mu	1956	Humbolt State College	Arcata, California	Inactive	
Beta Nu	1957	Chico State College	Chico, California	Inactive	
Beta Xi	1957-1960	Augustana College (Illinois)	Rock Island, Illinois	Inactive	(Note: Chapter formed from the Illinois Alpha chapter of Alpha Delta, established in 193-, as part of the national merger of the two organizations.)
Beta Omicron	1957-1961	Illinois State University	Normal, Illinois	Inactive	(Note: Chapter formed from the Illinois Theta chapter of Alpha Delta, established in 1951, as part of the national merger of the two organizations.)
Beta Pi	1957-	Ferris State University	Big Rapids, Michigan	Inactive	(Note: Chapter formed from the Michigan Beta chapter of Alpha Delta, established in 1951, as part of the national merger of the two organizations.)
Beta Rho	1957	Northern Illinois University	DeKalb, Illinois	Inactive	(Note: Chapter formed from the Illinois Zeta chapter of Alpha Delta, established in 1942, as part of the national merger of the two organizations.)
Beta Sigma	1957	Central Michigan University	Mount Pleasant, Michigan	Inactive	(Note: Chapter formed from the Michigan Alpha chapter of Alpha Delta, established in 1947, as part of the national merger of the two organizations.)
Beta Tau (see Alpha Iota)	1957	Franklin College	Franklin, Indiana	Merged (SCJ)	
Beta Upsilon	1957-	McPherson College	McPherson, Kansas	Inactive	
Beta Phi	1958	Central State College	Wilberforce, Ohio	Inactive	
Beta Chi	1958	Morehouse College	Atlanta, Georgia	Inactive	
Beta Psi	1958	Furman University	Greenville, South Carolina	Merged (SCJ)	
Beta Omega	1959	San Fernando Valley State College	Northridge, Los Angeles, California	Inactive	
Gamma Alpha	1959	University of San Francisco	San Francisco, California	Inactive	
Gamma Beta	1959	Northeast Missouri State Teachers College	Kirksville, Missouri	Inactive	
Gamma Gamma	1960	Findlay College	Findlay, Ohio	Inactive	
Gamma Delta	1960	Ohio State University	Columbus, Ohio	Inactive	
Gamma Epsilon	1961	Colorado State College	Greeley, Colorado	Inactive	
Gamma Zeta	1961	Bethel University	McKenzie, Tennessee	Merged (SCJ)	
Gamma Eta	1961	Indiana Central College	Indianapolis, Indiana	Inactive	
Gamma Theta	1961	Murray State University	Murray, Kentucky	Inactive	
Gamma Iota	1963	Anderson College	Anderson, Indiana	Merged (SCJ)	
Gamma Lambda (See Mu)	1963	California Institute of Technology	Pasadena, California	Merged (SCJ)	
Gamma Mu	1964–1975	Morningside College	Sioux City, Iowa	Merged (SCJ)	
Gamma Nu	1964-	University of Connecticut	Storrs, Connecticut	Inactive	
Gamma Xi	1964-	PennWest Clarion	Clarion, Pennsylvania	Inactive	
Gamma Omicron	1964-	Northern Michigan University	Marquette, Wisconsin	Inactive	
Gamma Pi	1964-	University of Wisconsin–Oshkosh	Oshkosh, Wisconsin	Inactive	
Gamma Rho	1964-	Troy State University	Troy, Alabama	Inactive	
Gamma Sigma	1965-	Stephen F. Austin State University	Nacogdoches, Texas	Inactive	
Gamma Tau	1965-	Taylor University	Upland, Indiana	Inactive	
Gamma Upsilon	April 1965–1975	General Motors Institute of Technology	Flint, Michigan	Merged (SCJ)	
Gamma Phi	1965–1975	Tri-State College	Angola, Indiana	Merged (SCJ)	
Gamma Chi	1965-	University of Rio Grande	Rio Grande, Ohio	Inactive	
Gamma Psi	1965–1975	Savannah State University	Savannah, Georgia	Merged (SCJ)	
Gamma Omega	1965–1975	Eastern Michigan University	Ypsilanti, Michigan	Merged (SCJ)	
Delta Alpha	1965-	University of Pikeville	Pikeville, Kentucky	Inactive	
Delta Beta	1966–1975	High Point College	High Point, North Carolina	Merged (SCJ)	
Delta Gamma	1966-	University of Massachusetts	Amherst, Massachusetts	Inactive	
Delta Delta	1967–1975	Bloomsburg State College	Bloomsburg, Pennsylvania	Merged (SCJ)	
Delta Epsilon	1967–1975	Juniata College	Huntingdon, Pennsylvania	Merged (SCJ)	
Delta Zeta	1967-	Virginia Union University	Richmond, Virginia	Inactive	
Delta Eta	1967–1975	Harding College	Searcy, Arkansas	Merged (SCJ)	
	1968–1975	Eastern Kentucky University	Richmond, Kentucky	Merged (SCJ)	
	1968–1975	Middle Tennessee State University	Murfreesboro, Tennessee	Merged (SCJ)	
	1969–1975	East Carolina University	Greenville, North Carolina	Merged (SCJ)	
	1970–1975	Elizabeth City State University	Elizabeth City, North Carolina	Merged (SCJ)	
	1970–1975	South Carolina State University	Orangeburg, South Carolina	Merged (SCJ)	
	1970–1975	West Virginia Wesleyan College	Buckhannon, West Virginia	Merged (SCJ)	
	1974–1975	William Paterson College	Wayne, New Jersey	Merged (SCJ)	
	1975–1975	Tennessee Tech	Cookeville, Tennessee	Merged (SCJ)	
