= List of Pi Delta Epsilon chapters =

Pi Delta Epsilon was an American collegiate honor fraternity for journalism that operated from 1909 until 1975 when it merged to form the Society for Collegiate Journalists. In the following list of chapters, inactive chapters and institutions are in italics.

| Chapter (Note: The use of Greek letter chapter names appears to have been discontinued sometime before the 1927 edition of Baird's.) | Charter date and range | Institution | Location | Status | Ref. |
|---|---|---|---|---|---|
| Alpha Alpha | 1909–1931 | Syracuse University | Syracuse, New York | Inactive | (Note: Chapter was originally known as Alpha.) |
| Alpha Beta | 1910–1918 | University of Nebraska | Lincoln, Nebraska | Inactive | (Note: Chapter was originally was called Beta.) |
| Alpha Gamma | 1910–1933 | Massachusetts Institute of Technology | Cambridge, Massachusetts | Inactive | (Note: Chapter was originally called Delta.) |
| Alpha Delta | 1911 | Ohio Wesleyan University | Delaware, Ohio | Inactive | (Note: Chapter was originally called Gamma.) |
| Alpha Epsilon | 1915–1924 | Columbia University | New York City, New York | Inactive | (Note: Chapter was originally called Epsilon.) |
| Alpha Iota | 1916 | Colgate University | Hamilton, New York | Inactive | |
| Alpha Kappa | 1917–1927 | University of Michigan | Ann Arbor, Michigan | Inactive | |
| Beta Alpha | 1917–1931 | Lawrence College | Appleton, Wisconsin | Inactive | |
| Beta Beta | 1917–1921; May 7, 1923 – 1934; December 14, 1938 | Coe College | Cedar Rapids, Iowa | Inactive | (Note: Chapter formed from Eta Theta Epsilon, established in 1916. It went inactive during World War I but reformed two years later.) |
| | 1917–1918; 1925–1931 | Hamline University | Saint Paul, Minnesota | Inactive | |
| Beta Beta | 1917–1924 | University of Arkansas | Fayetteville, Arkansas | Inactive | |
| Alpha Nu | 1918–1925 | Dartmouth College | Hanover, New Hampshire | Inactive | |
| Alpha Omicron | 1918–1931 | University of Illinois | Urbana, Illinois | Inactive | |
| Alpha Pi | 1918–1924 | University of Toronto | Toronto, Ontario, Canada | Inactive | |
| Gamma Alpha | 1919–1931 | University of California | Berkeley, California | Inactive | |
| Beta Epsilon | May 19, 1919 – 1928 | University of Tennessee | Knoxville, Tennessee | Inactive | |
| Alpha Rho | 1920 | Lehigh University | Bethlehem, Pennsylvania | Inactive | |
| Alpha Sigma | 1921 | Hamilton College | Clinton, New York | Inactive | |
| Alpha Tau | 1921–1931 | Swarthmore College | Swarthmore, Pennsylvania | Inactive | |
| Gamma Gamma | 1921–1931 | University of Utah | Salt Lake City, Utah | Inactive | |
| | 1922–1931, 1962 | Allegheny College | Meadville, Pennsylvania | Inactive | |
| | 1922 | University of Arizona | Tucson, Arizona | Inactive | |
| | 1921–1931 | Bowdoin College | Brunswick, Maine | Inactive | |
| | 1922 | Colorado State Agricultural College | Fort Collins, Colorado | Inactive | |
| | 1922–1931; 1955 | Emory University | Atlanta, Georgia | Inactive | |
| | 1922 | Georgia Institute of Technology | Atlanta, Georgia | Inactive | |
| | 1922 | George Washington University | Washington, D.C. | Inactive | |
| | 1922–1926 | Johns Hopkins University | Baltimore, Maryland | Inactive | |
| | 1922–1931 | University of Minnesota | Minneapolis, Minnesota | Inactive | |
| | 1922–1931 | Ohio State University | Columbus, Ohio | Inactive | |
| | 1922–1975 | Stevens Institute of Technology | Hoboken, New Jersey | Merged | (Note: Became a chapter of the Society for Collegiate Journalists with the national merger.) |
| | 1922–1926 | Vanderbilt University | Nashville, Tennessee | Inactive | |
| | 1922–1931 | Wesleyan University | Middletown, Connecticut | Inactive | |
| | 1922–1926 | Williams College | Williamstown, Massachusetts | Inactive | |
| | 1923–1931 | Union College | Schenectady, New York | Inactive | |
| | 1923 | Lafayette College | Easton, Pennsylvania | Inactive | |
| | 1923–1975 | Wabash College | Crawfordsville, Indiana | Merged | |
| | 1923 | Carnegie Institute of Technology | Pittsburgh, Pennsylvania | Inactive | |
| | 1923–1931 | Washington and Lee University | Lexington, Virginia | Inactive | |
| | 1924 | Bucknell University | Lewisburg, Pennsylvania | Inactive | |
| | 1924 | Carleton College | Northfield, Minnesota | Inactive | |
| | 1924–1931 | Michigan State College | East Lansing, Michigan | Inactive | |
| | 1924–1934 | Pennsylvania State College | State College, Pennsylvania | Inactive | |
| | 1924–1931 | University of Southern California | Los Angeles, California | Inactive | |
| | 1924–1931 | Utah State Agricultural College | Logan, Utah | Inactive | |
| | 1924–1975 | Washington & Jefferson College | Washington, Pennsylvania | Merged | |
| | 1925–1934, 1954 | University of Cincinnati | Cincinnati, Ohio | Inactive | |
| | 1925 | Cornell University | Ithaca, New York | Inactive | |
| | 1925 | St. Lawrence University | Canton, New York | Inactive | |
| | 1926 | University of California, Los Angeles | Los Angeles, California | Inactive | |
| | 1926–1931 | University of Florida | Gainesville, Florida | Inactive | |
| | 1926–1975 | University of Richmond | Richmond, Virginia | Merged | |
| | 1928 | Clark University | Worcester, Massachusetts | Inactive | |
| | 1928 | Denison University | Granville, Ohio | Inactive | |
| | 1930 | Wittenberg University | Springfield, Ohio | Inactive | |
| | 1930–1935 | Middlebury College | Middlebury, Vermont | Inactive | |
| | 1930–1975 | Virginia Tech | Blacksburg, Virginia | Merged | |
| | 1930–1975 | University of Maryland | College Park, Maryland | Merged | |
| | 1931–1935 | Catholic University of America | Washington, D.C. | Inactive | |
| | 1934–1975 | Westminster College | New Wilmington, Pennsylvania | Merged | |
| | 1935–1938, 1940–1975 | College of William & Mary | Williamsburg, Virginia | Merged | |
| | 1935 | St. Olaf College | Northfield, Minnesota | Inactive | |
| | 1937 | American University | Washington, D.C. | Inactive | |
| | 1938 | Moravian University | Bethlehem, Pennsylvania | Inactive | |
| | 1939 | Beaver College | Cheltenham Township, Pennsylvania | Inactive | |
| | 1939–1975 | Gettysburg College | Gettysburg, Pennsylvania | Merged | |
| | 1939–1975 | Hampden–Sydney College | Hampden Sydney, Virginia | Merged | |
| | 1939 | Mankato State College | Mankato, Minnesota | Inactive | |
| | 1939–1975 | Southern Illinois University Carbondale | Carbondale, Illinois | Merged | |
| | 1940–1975 | Midland University | Fremont, Nebraska | Merged | |
| | 1940 | University of Virginia | Charlottesville, Virginia | Inactive | |
| | 1940 | Randolph–Macon College | Ashland, Virginia | Inactive | |
| | 1941 | University of Tulsa | Tulsa, Oklahoma | Inactive | |
| | 1942 | Alfred University | Alfred, New York | Inactive | |
| | 1942 | Rensselaer Polytechnic Institute | Troy, New York | Inactive | |
| | 1943 | Illinois Institute of Technology | Chicago, Illinois | Inactive | |
| | 1944 | University of Minnesota Duluth | Duluth, Minnesota | Inactive | |
| | 1944–1975 | Alabama College | Montevallo, Alabama | Merged | |
| | 1944 | William Carey College | Hattiesburg, Mississippi | Inactive | |
| | 1944 | Ripon College | Ripon, Wisconsin | Inactive | |
| | 1944–1975 | University of South Dakota | Vermillion, South Dakota | Merged | |
| | 1944–1975 | Wayne State University | Detroit, Michigan | Merged | |
| | 1944 | Case Institute of Technology | Cleveland, Ohio | Inactive | |
| | 1945 | Cedar Crest College | Allentown, Pennsylvania | Inactive | |
| | 1946 | Longwood College | Farmville, Virginia | Inactive | |
| | 1947–1975 | Bethany College | Bethany, West Virginia | Merged | |
| | 1947 | University of Pittsburgh | Pittsburgh, Pennsylvania | Inactive | |
| | 1947–1975 | Mississippi State University | Starkville, Mississippi | Merged | |
| | 1948–1975 | Dickinson College | Carlisle, Pennsylvania | Merged | |
| | 1948–1975 | John Carroll University | University Heights, Ohio | Merged | |
| | 1948 | Pacific University | Forest Grove, Oregon | Inactive | |
| | 1948–1975 | University of Wyoming | Laramie, Wyoming | Merged | |
| | 1948–1975 | Worcester Polytechnic Institute | Worcester, Massachusetts | Merged | |
| | 1949–1975 | Thomas S. Clarkson Memorial College of Technology | Potsdam, New York | Merged | |
| | 1949–1975 | Eastern Illinois University | Charleston, Illinois | Merged | |
| | 1949 | Lewis & Clark College | Portland, Oregon | Inactive | |
| | 1949–1975 | Marietta College | Marietta, Ohio | Merged | |
| | 1950–1975 | Keuka College | Keuka Park, New York | Merged | |
| | 1950–1975 | Longwood College | Farmville, Virginia | Merged | |
| | 1950 | Southwestern University | Georgetown, Texas | Inactive | |
| | 1950 | University of Bridgeport | Bridgeport, Connecticut | Inactive | |
| | 1950–1975 | Utica College of Syracuse University | Utica, New York | Merged | |
| | 1951–1975 | New Jersey Institute of Technology | Newark, New Jersey | Merged | |
| | 1951–1975 | State University of New York at Potsdam | Potsdam, New York | Merged | |
| | 1951 | Shepherd College | Shepherdstown, West Virginia | Inactive | |
| | 1951–1975 | Upsala College | East Orange, New Jersey | Merged | |
| | 1951 | Westminster College | Fulton, Missouri | Inactive | |
| | 1951 | Albright College | Reading, Pennsylvania | Inactive | |
| | 1951 | Lynchburg College | Lynchburg, Virginia | Inactive | |
| | 1952–1975 | Memphis State University | Memphis, Tennessee | Merged | |
| | 1952 | St. Mary's College | Winona, Minnesota | Inactive | |
| | 1953 | Arizona State University | Tempe, Arizona | Inactive | |
| | 1953–1975 | Florida Southern College | Lakeland, Florida | Merged | |
| | 1953–1975 | Hofstra University | Hempstead, New York | Merged | |
| | 1953–1975 | Muhlenberg College | Allentown, Pennsylvania | Merged | |
| | 1953 | St. Cloud State University | St. Cloud, Minnesota | Inactive | |
| | 1953–1975 | Thiel College | Greenville, Pennsylvania | Merged | |
| | 1953 | University of Louisville | Louisville, Kentucky | Inactive | |
| | 1953 | University of Tampa | Tampa, Florida | Inactive | |
| | 1954 | College of Steubenville | Steubenville, Ohio | Inactive | |
| | 1954 | Heidelberg College | Tiffin, Ohio | Inactive | |
| | 1954–1975 | Missouri Valley College | Marshall, Missouri | Merged | |
| | 1955–1975 | Bridgewater College | Bridgewater, Virginia | Merged | |
| | 1955 | Western Reserve University | Cleveland, Ohio | Inactive | |
| | 1956 | Drew University | Madison, New Jersey | Inactive | |
| | 1956–1975 | Saint Francis University | Loretto, Pennsylvania | Merged | |
| | 1956 | University of Wisconsin–Eau Claire | Eau Claire, Wisconsin | Inactive | |
| | 1957 | Georgian Court University | Lakewood Township, New Jersey | Inactive | |
| | 1957–1975 | Our Lady of Cincinnati College | Cincinnati, Ohio | Merged | |
| | 1958 | University of Miami | Coral Gables, Florida | Inactive | |
| | 1959 | Brown University | Providence, Rhode Island | Inactive | |
| | 1959 | Loyola University Chicago | Chicago, Illinois | Inactive | |
| | 1960–1975 | Caldwell College for Women | Caldwell, New Jersey | Merged | |
| | 1960–1975 | Glassboro State College | Glassboro, New Jersey | Merged | |
| | 1960–1975 | Kansas State College of Pittsburg | Pittsburg, Kansas | Merged | |
| | 1961–1975 | Linfield College | McMinnville, Oregon | Merged | |
| | 1961 | Fairleigh Dickinson University | Teaneck, New Jersey | Inactive | |
| | 1961 | Jersey City State College | Jersey City, New Jersey | Inactive | |
| | 1961 | University of Wisconsin–Milwaukee | Milwaukee, Wisconsin | Inactive | |
| | 1961–1975 | Valparaiso University | Valparaiso, Indiana | Merged | |
| | 1961 | Western Illinois University | Macomb, Illinois | Inactive | |
| | 1961 | Creighton University | Omaha, Nebraska | Inactive | |
| | 1961–1975 | Winona State University | Winona, Minnesota | Merged | |
| | 1961 | Saint Elizabeth University | Morris County, New Jersey | Inactive | |
| | 1962 | Fairleigh Dickinson University | Madison, New Jersey | Inactive | |
| | 1962–1975 | Rider University | Lawrence Township, New Jersey | Merged | |
| | 1962–1975 | King's College | Wilkes-Barre, Pennsylvania | Merged | |
| | 1962–1975 | Kearney State College | Kearney, Nebraska | Merged | |
| | 1964–1975 | Bemidji State University | Bemidji, Minnesota | Merged | |
| | 1964–1975 | Lipscomb University | Nashville, Tennessee | Merged | |
| | 1964–1975 | Radford University | Radford, Virginia | Merged | |
| | 1965–1975 | Edinboro State College | Edinboro, Pennsylvania | Merged | |
| | 1965–1975 | Hartwick College | Oneonta, New York | Merged | |
| | 1965–1975 | Millersville State College | Millersville, Pennsylvania | Merged | |
| | 1965–1975 | Northeastern Oklahoma State University | Tahlequah, Oklahoma | Merged | |
| | 1965–1975 | Rutgers University | New Brunswick, New Jersey | Merged | |
| | 1965–1975 | Shippensburg State College | Shippensburg, Pennsylvania | Merged | |
| | 1965–1975 | Southeast Missouri State University | Cape Girardeau, Missouri | Merged | |
| | 1965–1975 | St. John's University | New York City, New York | Merged | |
| | 1966–1975 | Aurora College | Aurora, Illinois | Merged | |
| | 1966–1975 | California State College | California, Pennsylvania | Merged | |
| | 1966–1975 | St. John's University Staten Island Campus | Staten Island, New York, New York | Merged | |
| | 1967–1975 | Evangel University | Springfield, Missouri | Merged | |
| | 1967–1975 | Mount St. Mary's University | Emmitsburg, Maryland | Merged | |
| | 1967–1975 | Slippery Rock State College | Slippery Rock, Pennsylvania | Merged | |
| | 1967–1975 | St. Bonaventure University | St. Bonaventure, New York | Merged | |
| | 1968–1975 | Northwest Missouri State University | Maryville, Missouri | Merged | |
| | 1969–1975 | Texas Wesleyan University | Fort Worth, Texas | Merged | |
| | 1970–1975 | Fort Hays State College | Hays, Kansas | Merged | |
| | 1971–1975 | East Stroudsburg State College | East Stroudsburg, Pennsylvania | Merged | |
| | 1972–1975 | Winthrop College | Rock Hill, South Carolina | Merged | |
| | 1974–1975 | York College of Pennsylvania | Spring Garden Township, Pennsylvania | Merged | |
| | 19xx ?–1975 | Cabrini University | Radnor Township, Pennsylvania | Merged | (Note: Became a chapter of the Society for Collegiate Journalists, but still uses the name Pi Delta Epsilon.) |
