= Ralph L. Ropp =

11th president of Louisiana Tech University

Ralph Loyd Ropp

11th President of Louisiana Tech University
- In office 1949–1962
- Preceded by: Claybrook Cottingham
- Succeeded by: F. Jay Taylor

Personal details
- Born: March 3, 1897 Latty, Paulding County, Ohio, USA
- Died: March 31, 1982 (aged 85)
- Resting place: Forest Lawn Cemetery in Ruston, Louisiana
- Spouse: Effie Lee Jones Ropp
- Children: Linda Lou Ropp May Col. Ralph Edwin Ropp (deceased) John M. Ropp
- Parent(s): Edward F. and Viola Finnegan Ropp
- Education: Ohio Northern University; Louisiana State University
- Occupation: College president; Professor

Ralph Loyd Ropp (March 3, 1897 – March 31, 1982) was an Ohio native who from 1949 to 1962 served as the 11th president of Louisiana Tech University in Ruston, Louisiana, having preceded F. Jay Taylor.

== Background ==
Ropp was born in Latty in Paulding County in northwestern Ohio, Ropp was one of two sons of Ohio native Edward F. Ropp (1867–1935) and the former Viola M. Finnegan (1874–1960), originally from Illinois. Until he was twelve years of age, Ropp attended a one-room school and then graduated in 1913 from Latty High Schoo1. In 1923, he received a Bachelor of Science degree from the private regional institution, Ohio Northern University in Ada in Hardin County. In 1955, Ropp received an honorary doctor of laws degree from his alma mater.

From 1927 to 1928, Ropp was the third national president of Alpha Phi Gamma (which later became part of Society of Collegiate Journalists) Oddly, a previous Louisiana Tech president, John Keeny, for whom the university administration building is named, had also studied at Ohio Northern; his field was music.

On April 1, 1926, Ropp married the former Effie Lee Jones (1902–2000), an educator and a member of the Daughters of the American Revolution. The Ropps, who were United Methodist, had three children, Ralph Edwin Ropp (1928–1993), a colonel and director of internal information for the United States Army in Washington, D.C., later of DeRidder, Louisiana, Linda Lou Ropp May, and John M. Ropp (born 1930). In her later years, Effie Ropp had returned to live in Natchitoches, along with son John and daughter Linda May. After her mother's death, Linda May, divorced from Fred May of Seattle, Washington, subsequently left Natchitoches to return to Ruston.

== Academic career ==
In 1925, Ropp procured a Master of Arts in English from Louisiana State University in Baton Rouge. Before he came to Louisiana Tech, Ropp had been from 1923 to 1949 professor of speech and head of the forensics department at Northwestern State University in Natchitoches, Louisiana. At Northwestern, Ropp in 1940 wrote the poem "Old Normal Hill" inscribed on a metal plaque on a stone monument on campus. Three of four white columns which supported the east gable of the Bullard Mansion remain on "The Hill". These columns are the unofficial symbol of NSU and were added in 1980 to the National Register of Historic Places.

During Roth's tenure as president, sixteen major buildings on the Louisiana Tech campus were constructed. Seven academic departments were created, and the institution, then known as "Louisiana Polytechnic Institute", launched the first master's degree. The Ropp Center, first built on the Louisiana Tech campus in 1911 and formerly the home of the college president, is named in his honor.

In 1976, Ropp joined Mary Frances Fletcher, a Louisiana Tech English professor, in writing the book, Lincoln Parish History, intended for distribution in the bicentennial of the American Revolution.

In 2013, busts of Ropp and his two successors, F. Jay Taylor and Daniel Reneau, were unveiled at Tech's Spirit Park located on campus between Davison Hall and the Biomedical Engineering Building. Busts of Albert Einstein, Martin Luther King Jr., Anne Frank, and Voltaire were already on display there.

Ropp died on March 31, 1982, at Lincoln General Hospital in Ruston, Louisiana. Ralph and Effie Ropp are interred at Forest Lawn Cemetery in Ruston.

Preceded by Claybrook Cottingham	11th President of Louisiana Tech University in Ruston, Louisiana; 1949–1962	Succeeded by F. Jay Taylor
