= Louisiana Tech University College of Engineering and Science =

Louisiana Tech College of Engineering and Science
- Former names: Mechanical Arts Department, School of Engineering, College of Engineering
- Type: Public engineering college
- Established: 1894
- Parent institution: Louisiana Tech University
- Dean: Hisham E. Hegab
- Students: 2,254
- Postgraduates: 217
- Doctoral students: 151
- Location: Ruston, Louisiana, U.S.
- Website: www.latech.edu/coes

The College of Engineering and Science (COES) is one of five colleges at Louisiana Tech University, a public research university in Ruston, Louisiana. The roots of the college date back to the founding of Louisiana Tech in 1894 when the Department of Mechanics was created. Today, the college includes twenty-five degree-granting programs: fourteen undergraduate, seven master's, and four doctoral programs. College programs are located on the Louisiana Tech campus in Ruston, Louisiana. In addition, courses are offered at the CenturyLink Headquarters in Monroe, Louisiana, at Barksdale Air Force Base, in Bossier City, Louisiana, and at the Louisiana Tech Shreveport Center in Shreveport, Louisiana.

== Program history ==
The College started in 1894 as the Department of Mechanics. As the engineering program at Louisiana Tech grew, the Department of Mechanics expanded and evolved into the Mechanical Arts Department, the School of Engineering, and the College of Engineering. The college in its current configuration was formed when the College of Engineering and the School of Science merged on May 15, 1996. The merger combined the engineering programs of the College of Engineering with the chemistry, mathematics & statistics, and physics programs of the School of Science.

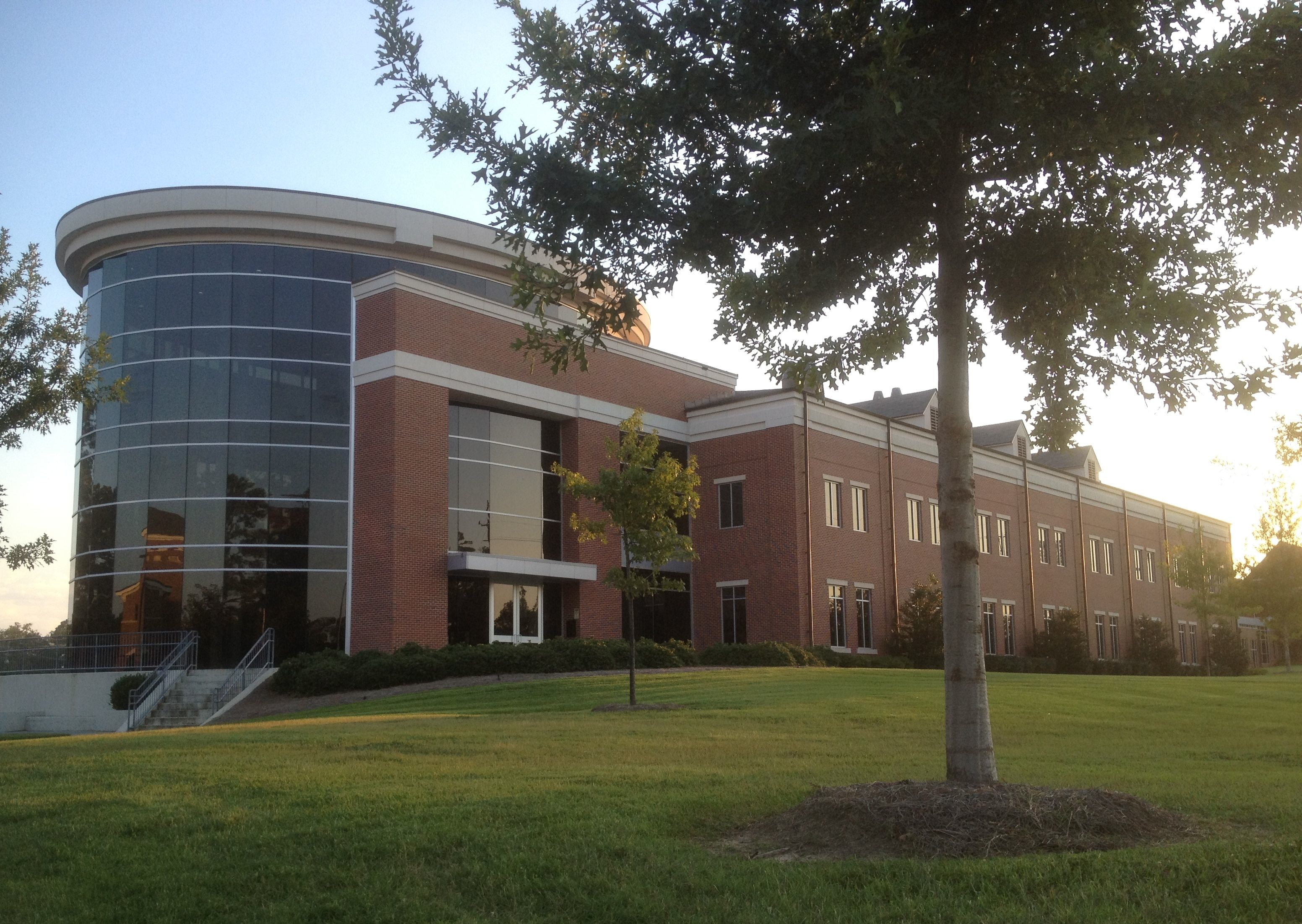
Biomedical Engineering Building

In 1972, Louisiana Tech established the Biomedical Engineering Program within the College of Engineering. The program was the seventh undergraduate biomedical engineering program in the United States to be accredited by ABET and the first program to award a Ph.D. in Biomedical Engineering. Its first program chair was Daniel Reneau, a former President of Louisiana Tech University. As program chair, Reneau founded the Alpha Eta Mu Beta (AEMB) honor society for biomedical engineering students and established the first chapter of the society at Louisiana Tech.

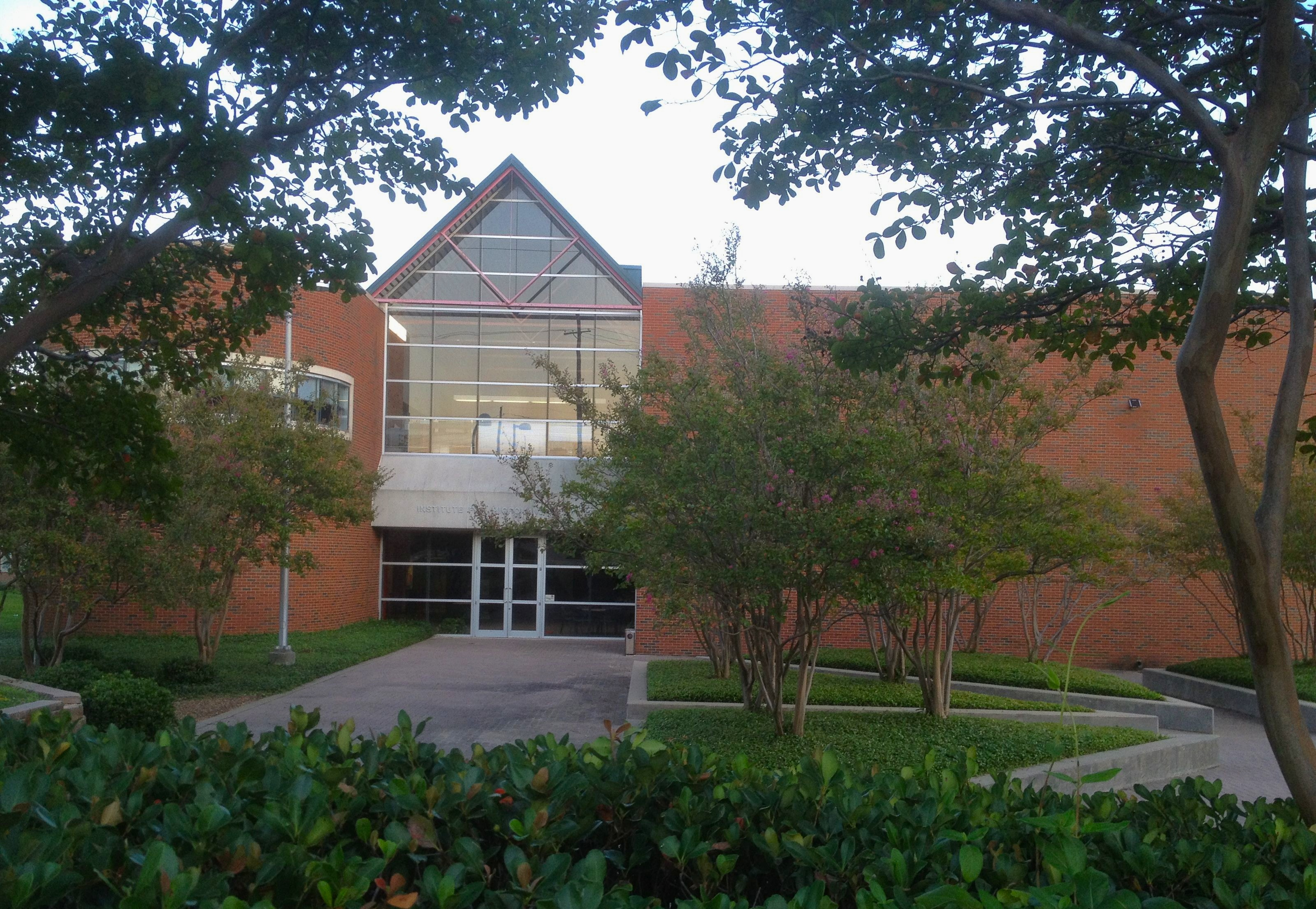
Institute for Micromanufacturing

The Institute for Micromanufacturing (IfM) was first established in 1991 as the first institute of its kind in the United States. The Institute's mission (in part) is to research and develop microsystems and nanosystems technology, generate commercially viable intellectual technology, and develop curricula and educate students in the fields of micro/nano scale technologies and systems. While the original focus of the institute was on micromanufacturing, the mission was expanded in 2003 to include centers of excellence in nanotechnology, biotechnology, biomedical nanotechnology, environmental technology, and information technology. The IfM has three facilities for its research and development activities: the IfM building on the south part of the Louisiana Tech campus, the Technology Transfer Center at the Shreve Park Industrial Campus in Shreveport, and the X-ray Beamlines/Processing facility at CAMD in Baton Rouge.

Louisiana Tech established the first Nanosystems Engineering program in the United States in 2005 after approval was granted by the Louisiana Board of Regents. In May 2007, Josh Brown became the first person in the world to earn a Bachelor's Degree in Nanosystems Engineering when he graduated with a double major in nanosystems engineering and electrical engineering. On August 25, 2011, the program became the nation's first undergraduate degree program in the field of nanoengineering to receive ABET accreditation. As of 2011, the Nanosystems Engineering Program has produced 21 graduates with another 70 students enrolled in the program.

In November 2010, Louisiana Tech and Bossier Parish Community College (BPCC) signed an agreement to establish an Associate of Science in Engineering program at BPCC. The program is designed for BPCC students that wish to continue their studies and transfer to Louisiana Tech to pursue a bachelor's degree in engineering. Under the deal, BPCC students can transfer 60 credit hours from BPCC courses toward one of seven Louisiana Tech engineering disciplines.

In September 2012, Louisiana Tech launched the United States' first undergraduate degree program in Cyber Engineering.

== Building history ==
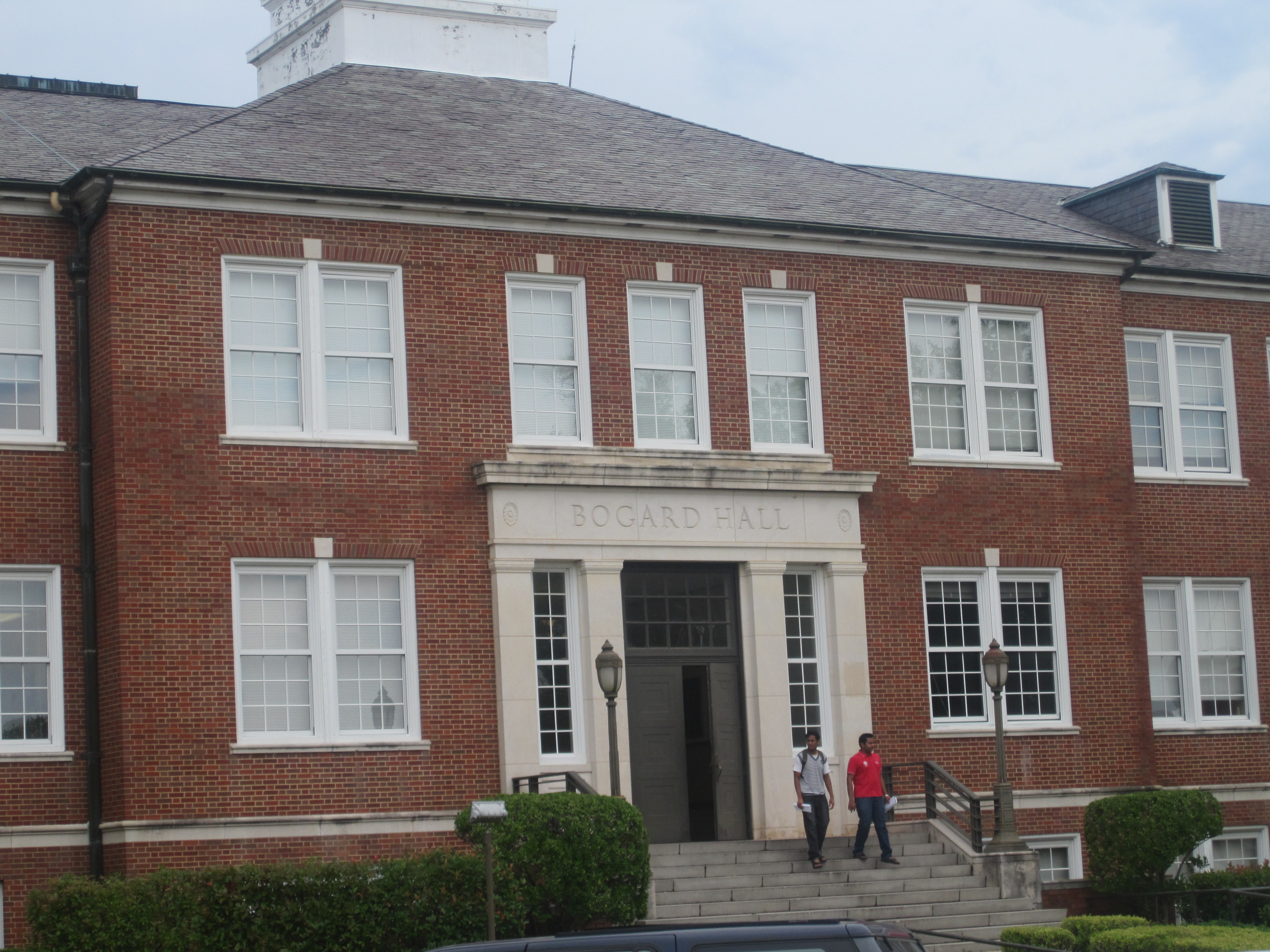
Bogard Hall

The College of Engineering and Science and its predecessors have had two main homes on the Tech campus since 1904. The first building for Tech’s engineering program was built in 1904 and named the Mechanic Arts Building. This building housed the Mechanic Arts Department (which over time expanded into the School of Engineering) from 1904 until 1940. The Mechanic Arts Building was demolished shortly after the erection of Bogard Hall on the east side of the campus.

Bogard Hall is the second and current home of the College of Engineering and Science. Louisiana Tech constructed the building in 1940 and named it after Frank Bogard, the Dean of Engineering at Louisiana Tech from 1910 to 1918 and from 1923 to 1937. Bogard Hall was built to meet the expanding engineering program at Tech.

Nethken Hall is the home of Louisiana Tech's electrical engineering and computer science programs. The building is located on Arizona Avenue a few hundred feet from Bogard Hall. When construction was completed in 1967, the building was simply named the Electrical Engineering Building. In 1970, it was renamed in honor of Harley J. Nethken, a former Tech professor, electrical engineering department head, and Acting Dean of the School of Engineering at Tech from 1942 to 1946.

In early 2011, Louisiana Tech announced plans to construct a new Integrated Engineering and Science Building adjacent to Bogard Hall. The 60,000-square-foot (5,600 m^{2}) building will provide new classrooms, shops, and meeting rooms for engineering, science, and math students at Louisiana Tech. When the new engineering building is complete, the university will begin renovations of Bogard Hall.

== Traditions ==
=== Engineering and Science Week ===
Louisiana Tech University holds Engineering and Science Week each year during the spring quarter to honor innovation and dedication in the engineering field. The week-long activities feature an award ceremony for outstanding engineering students for the school year, a competition between the different COES departments, presentations and exhibits targeted to prospective engineering students, and the Engineering & Science Ball.

The first celebration by Louisiana Tech to honor the university's engineering students was held in 1924 with a banquet. The first official Engineers' Day was held in 1934 as a way to introduce prospective students. Through the years, the events grew into a week-long celebration called Engineers' Week. After a brief hiatus in the 1990s, Engineers' Week was brought back in 1998 with large support from the student body.

The Engineers' Week activities became Engineering and Science Week in order to include students majoring in science degrees after the College of Engineering and the School of Science merged. In recent years, the Louisiana Tech Engineering & Science Association has expanded Engineering and Science Week to include new events like E&S Day, the Spring Release Crawfish Boil, the E&S Ball, and the E&S Major Competition.

=== Gumbo Fest ===
The Gumbo Fest is held every September by the Engineering and Science Association to provide a way for returning engineering and science students to reconnect after the summer and introduce the incoming freshmen to their peers and professors. Incoming students are introduced to the organizations within the college during the event. The first Gumbo Fest took place in 2001 and has continued every year since. The event was originally held around Bogard Hall, but has recently been moved to Argent Pavilion on the Louisiana Tech Football Complex.

In the first few years of Gumbo Fest, former COES Dean, Les Guice, would cook a batch of gumbo with his special recipe. When the event became too big for him to tackle, a caterer was brought in to prepare the food.

== Student competitions ==
=== ASCE Concrete Canoe ===
The Louisiana Tech chapter of the American Society of Civil Engineers (ASCE) competes in the Gulf Coast Regional Conference's Concrete Canoe Competition every year. Known as "the America's Cup of Civil Engineering," the Concrete Canoe Competition requires the students to apply lessons and information learned in the classroom toward designing and constructing a water-worthy concrete canoe while developing time management, leadership, and dedication skills. The Louisiana Tech ASCE chapter won the Deep South Regional Conference competition 10 times in the school's history (1998, 2008, 2010, 2011, 2012, 2014, 2015, 2019, 2022, and 2023). The members of the Deep South Conference were ASCE chapters from universities in Arkansas, Louisiana, Mississippi, and Tennessee. Since 2020, Louisiana Tech has competed in the Gulf Coast Regional Conference made up of ASCE chapters from universities in Alabama, Louisiana, and Mississippi. In 2022, Louisiana Tech University hosted the National Concrete Canoe Competition (CCC), with the races being held at Lincoln Parish Park. At the 2023 National Conference held in Platteville, Wisconsin, the LA Tech placed 5th in the Final Product Prototype category. The LA Tech ASCE Chapter has also had great success in the Sustainable Solutions Competition, winning the Gulf Coast Regional three consecutive years (2021-2023) and placing 3rd (2021) and 2nd (2023) Nationally.

Year	Regional Conference Champions	National Standing
1998	Deep South: Louisiana Tech	14th
2008	Deep South: Louisiana Tech	21st
2010	Deep South: Louisiana Tech	22nd
2011	Deep South: Louisiana Tech	17th
2012	Deep South: Louisiana Tech	21st
2014	Deep South: Louisiana Tech	17th
2015	Deep South: Louisiana Tech	TBD
2019	Deep South: Louisiana Tech	18th
2022	Gulf Coast: Louisiana Tech	6th
2023	Gulf Coast: Louisiana Tech	7th

=== ASCE/AISC Steel Bridge ===
The Louisiana Tech chapter of the American Society of Civil Engineers (ASCE) and AISC competes in the Gulf Coast Regional Conference's Steel Bridge Competition every year. Known as "the America's Cup of Civil Engineering," the Steel Bridge Competition requires the students to apply lessons and information learned in the classroom toward designing and constructing a steel bridge while developing time management, leadership, and dedication skills. The Louisiana Tech ASCE/AISC chapter won the Regional Conference competition eight times in the school's history (1993, 1994, 1995, 1996, 1997, 1998, 2011, and 2017). The members of the former Deep South Conference were ASCE chapters from universities in Arkansas, Louisiana, Mississippi, and Tennessee. Since 2020, Louisiana Tech now competes in the Gulf Coast Regional Conference made up of ASCE chapters from universities in Alabama, Louisiana, and Mississippi. In 2024, Louisiana Tech University will host the National Steel Bridge Competition, with the bridge builds being held at the Ruston Sports Complex.

=== NASTT/ISTT Student Competitions ===
The Louisiana Tech University chapter of the North American Society for Trenchless Technology (NASTT) is one of the oldest and most active NASTT Student Chapters in North America. NASTT is an engineering society of individuals, public organizations, and private companies with strong beliefs in the practical, social, and environmental benefits of trenchless technology. The chapter is also one of the most awarded NASTT student chapters, having competed in various student competitions at the NASTT No-Dig Show each year. Their history of awards include seven Charles P. Lake Rain for Rent scholarships (2005, 2007, 2008, 2009, 2010, 2015, 2016), six Michael E. Argent Memorial scholarships (2010, 2016, 2017, 2018, 2019x2), three Student CCTV Competition awards (2003: 1st; 2008: 1st; 2010: 3rd), five Student Chapter Presentation awards (2005: 2nd; 2015: 1st; 2016: 1st; 2017: 1st; 2018: 1st), and seven Student Poster Competition awards (2005: 2nd; 2008: 2nd; 2015: 1st and 2nd; 2018: 2nd; 2022: 1st and 2nd). The student chapter members have also won two International Society of Trenchless Technology (ISTT) Student Paper Awards at ISTT No-Dig Conferences (2005 in Rotterdam and 2022 in Helsinki).

=== Shell Eco-marathon ===
The Louisiana Tech eco-car team was first organized during the 2007-08 academic year. The student team designs innovative fuel-efficient vehicles to compete in the Shell Eco-marathon Americas annual competition in Houston. In 2010, the Louisiana Tech eco-car team won the Urban Concept Design competition and the Urban Concept Team Spirit Award. In 2011, the eco-car team won the Urban Concept Design competition and the Urban Concept Safety Award. In addition, the Louisiana Tech eco-car team set the Urban Concept Gasoline United States record at 646.7 miles per gallon. In 2012, Tech won the Urban Concept Gasoline Design competition and the Urban Concept Team Spirit Award. Also, the Louisiana Tech eco-car team set the Urban Concept Diesel United States record at 488 miles per gallon. In 2013, the team won the Urban Concept Diesel competition. In 2014, La Tech eco-car won the Vehicle Design Award.

== Publications ==
=== The Engineer/E&S Magazine ===
The E&S Magazine is the semiannual publication of the Louisiana Tech University College of Engineering and Science. This publication chronicles the activities of the engineering and science students at Louisiana Tech, provides updates on the growth of the College of Engineering and Science, and publishes technical and engineering articles. The two editions of the magazine are usually published in the spring quarter (March–April) and the fall/winter quarter (November–December).

The publication started in September 1939 as The Engineer. The Engineer was published from 1939 until budget cuts led to the magazine's folding in 1991. After a 12-year hiatus, The Engineer resumed biannual publication in 2003. The magazine was renamed The E&S Magazine in 2005 to incorporate the science students within the COES.

== Student organizations ==
=== Honor societies ===
- Alpha Eta Mu Beta (Biomedical Engineering)
- Alpha Pi Mu (Industrial Engineering)
- Chi Epsilon (Civil Engineering)
- Eta Kappa Nu (Electrical Engineering)
- Omega Chi Epsilon (Chemical Engineering)
- Pi Mu Epsilon (Mathematics)
- Pi Tau Sigma (Mechanical Engineering)
- Sigma Pi Sigma (Physics)
- Tau Beta Pi (Engineering)
- Upsilon Pi Epsilon (Computer Science)

=== Professional organizations ===
- Amateur Radio Club (W5HGT)
- American Chemical Society (ACS)
- American Institute of Chemical Engineers (AIChE)
- American Society of Civil Engineers (ASCE)
- American Society of Heating, Refrigerating and Air-Conditioning Engineers (ASHRAE)
- American Society of Mechanical Engineers (ASME)
- Association for Computing Machinery (ACM)
- Association of Cyber Engineers (ACE)
- Association of General Contractors (AGC)
- Astronomy Club
- Biomedical Engineering Society (BMES)
- Bulldog Entrepreneurs
- Eco-Car Marathon Team
- Engineering and Science Association (ESA)
- Engineers Without Borders
- Institute of Electrical and Electronics Engineers (IEEE)
- Institute of Electrical and Electronics Engineers (IEEE) Nanotechnology Council
- Institute of Industrial Engineers (IIE)
- National Society of Black Engineers (NSBE)
- North American Society for Trenchless Technology (NASTT)
- Society of Automotive Engineers (SAE)
- Society of Physics Students (SPS)
- Society of Women Engineers (SWE)

== Notable people ==
- Nick Akins
- Woodie Flowers
- Les Guice
- Yuri Lvov
- Virgil Orr
- R. Byron Pipes
- Dan Reneau
- John Simonton
- David Wade
- Will Wright
