= 1928 Louisiana Normal Tigers football team =

American college football season

1928 Louisiana Normal Tigers football
- Conference: Independent
- Record: 1–0
- Head coach: Ralph Waldo Emerson Jones (1st season)

The 1928 Louisiana Normal Tigers football team represented Louisiana Negro Normal and Industrial Institute—now known as Grambling State University—as an independent during the 1928 college football season. In their first season under head coach Ralph Waldo Emerson Jones, the Tigers compiled a 1–0 record.

== Schedule ==
Opponent	Site	Result
Arkansas AM&N		W 88–13
