= Band of Pride =

Marching band of Louisiana Tech University

- School: Louisiana Tech University
- Location: Ruston, Louisiana
- Conference: C-USA
- Founded: 1906
- Director: Dr. Christopher Heidenreich
- Assistant Director: Dr. Greg Lyons
- Members: 150+

Uniform
- Red, white, and blue coat Black pants Black shoes Black gloves White shako White and silver plume
- Website: www.band.latech.edu

The Band of Pride (BOP) is the official marching band which represents Louisiana Tech University in Ruston, Louisiana. The Band of Pride performs pregame and during halftime at all Louisiana Tech Bulldogs football games, and travels (e.g., Bowl games, C-USA) to select road football games. Auditions are held throughout the academic year as scheduled for the upcoming Fall Quarter.

== History and List of Directors ==
=== Leland Brown (1927–1932) ===
Leland L. Brown served as the chair of the Music Department from 1925-1933. He also served as the director of the university's orchestra.

=== Doris Burd Haskell (1933) ===
Doris Burd Haskell was a music faculty member and orchestra director in the Music Department, and she held an MM degree from the New England Conservatory of Music and a BM from the Chicago Conservatory of Music. She also served as organist at the Episcopal Church of the Redeemer in Ruston, LA from 1952-1962.

=== Rodney Cline (1934–1935) ===
Dr. William Rodney Cline graduated from Louisiana Polytechnic Institute (now Louisiana Tech University) and earned a masters degree from Louisiana State University and a PhD from George Peabody College for Teachers. He taught at various schools in south Louisiana and at the demonstration school at Louisiana Tech where he also taught education. He later served as academic dean at Louisiana Tech before becoming dean of John McNeese Junior College (now McNeese State University) in Lake Charles, Louisiana. He also served as the second president of the University of Louisiana at Monroe (1944-1950, then called Ouachita Parish Community College).

=== James A. Smith (1936–1949) ===
James Alvey Smith earned his MM in violin performance from the University of Michigan in 1936. He had spent four years with the Baton Rouge Symphony and thirteen years as band and orchestra director at Louisiana Tech University in Ruston, Louisiana. In 1941 the band, under his leadership, was organized on a military basis with complete self-government. The director spent his entire time making plans for performances, conducting rehearsals and supervising presentations. The James Alvey Smith Professorship in Music/Performing Arts was established in 1996 by the estate of Elva Leggett Smith.

James Alvey Smith is the composer of the Louisiana Tech University Fight Song.

=== Jimmy Howard Reynolds (1966–1972) ===
John "Jimmy" McCormack Reynolds grew up in Shreveport, Louisiana, and received degrees in music from Louisiana State University and the University of Michigan. After teaching in public schools in Florida, Mississippi and Louisiana, he served as director of bands at Peabody/Vanderbilt University, director of bands and head of the Department of Music at Louisiana Tech University and director of bands at Iowa State University. From 1980 to 1985 he was director of youth music for the Municipality of Jerusalem, resident conductor of the Israel National Youth Band, and music consultant for The Rothschild Foundation, Israel. He also taught courses in music education at Tel Aviv University and the Reuben Academy of Jerusalem. Reynolds was a past president of the Southern Division of the College Band Directors National Association and member of many other national and regional band associations. He served honorably in the United States Navy as a lieutenant, junior grade. As a lifelong educator spending much of the 1950’s and 60’s in the Deep South, he held a firm belief in the work of the civil rights movement, often taking stands that put him at odds with the political and social climate of the times.

The current band building at Louisiana Tech was erected in 1968 under his leadership.

=== Dr. Daniel Pittman (1983-1989) ===
Dr. Daniel Pittman, now professor emerit at Georgia Southern University, served that institution in several capacities: For 16 years he was the director of bands after leaving Louisiana Tech, and most recently he served as interim director of the University’s Center for International Studies; Pittman led the GSU Studies Abroad Program in Music, combining European concert tours by the performing ensembles with academic music classes offered in overseas locations in its European Academic Residency.

=== Jim Robken (1991–2021) ===
The band was previously under the direction of Mr. Jim Robken (one of the founding fathers of basketball bands, from his time as director of the University of Arkansas Razorback Marching Band and the Hogwild Basketball Band in the 1980s). Mr. Robken came to Louisiana Tech in 1991, where he brought his ideas and enthusiasm with him. Mr. Robken, or "jRob" as his students call him, was best known around campus as "the man in the hat." His motto was "Oh Lord, it's hard to be Humble!" He was quite humble when it came to his talents as both a music composer and marching band drill designer. His drill designs were intricately unique to Tech Band and fans came from all over, especially from Arkansas, Mississippi, and Texas to enjoy good music and great teamwork. Mr. Robken was also formerly a student of Louisiana Tech, and was a member of Phi Mu Alpha

=== Christopher Heidenreich (2021–present ) ===
Dr. Christopher Heidenreich was appointed Associate Professor and Director of Bands in Fall 2021 after serving at the University of Michigan-Flint since 2009. Prior work includes three years at Youngstown State University and 14 teaching public school in Ohio. He completed his Doctor of Music in Wind Conducting from Indiana University (2006), holds a Master of Arts in Music Education from The Ohio State University (1998) and a Bachelor of Music degree from Bowling Green State University (1989), where he graduated cum laude.

From 2011-2021 he served as Conductor and Music Director of the Washtenaw Community Concert Band of Ann Arbor, Mich. In 2002, he was awarded the American School Band Directors Association’s “Distinguished Band Director” Award for Ohio and the North Central Region, and in 2013 UM-Flint awarded him the Faculty Distinguished Service Award. The Michigan School Band and Orchestra Association granted him with an Honorary Membership for service to the state in 2020.

Heidenreich has long been in demand as an adjudicator for concert and marching bands throughout Michigan, Ohio, Kentucky, and Illinois. He has presented at the Midwest Clinic, the Michigan Music Conference, and the Ohio Music Education Association Convention. In addition, he is a contributor to Teaching Music Through Performing in Band, and has published various articles in The National Band Association Journal, The Instrumentalist, The International Trumpet Guild, The Association of Concert Bands Journal, and The WASBE World Magazine.

Heidenreich studied under the mentorship of Ray E. Cramer and Stephen W. Pratt while at IU and assisted there with the Marching Hundred. He held various guest conducting responsibilities with each of the wind bands and continued trumpet study with Professor Joey Tartell. His doctoral project, completed in partial fulfillment of the degree, included creating a new edition of Gordon Jacob’s An Original Suite, composed in 1924. His new editions of the Jacob and Kalinnikov’s Symphony No. 1 in G Minor receive regular national and international performances. Heidenreich is a member of the National Association for Music Educators, Michigan School Band and Orchestra Association, the College Band Directors National Association, National Band Association, and a lifetime member of the National Eagle Scout Association.

== Hoop Troop ==
Hoop Troop is the official basketball pep band at Louisiana Tech University. The Hoop Troop performs at most men's and women's basketball home games and travels to select road basketball games. The band also usually travels to all post-season games played by the Bulldogs and Lady Techsters, and is known nationally as one of the best basketball bands in college basketball. In the 2005 post-season, the Hoop Troop was featured in a Sports Illustrated's College Edition article, "65 Things We Want to See During March Madness" in which states, "30) The Louisiana Tech pep band, a.k.a. the Hoop Troop, the funniest band in the land." The Hoop Troop was the only basketball band to be listed.

== Other Ensembles ==
=== Jazz ensembles ===
The jazz ensembles are directed by Dr. Wade Dillingham. The ensembles have open auditions each year during the start of the Fall Quarter.

=== Percussion ensemble ===
The percussion ensemble is directed by Dr. Greg Lyons. The ensemble has open auditions for marching band as announced and music majors are encouraged to apply early and schedule an audition with the studio director.

=== Symphonic wind ensemble ===
The symphonic wind ensemble is directed by Dr. Christopher Heidenreich. Auditions for the Symphonic Wind Ensemble are open to music and non-music/band students from all academic colleges on campus. The auditions are held at the end of Fall Quarter. Concerts are held during the Winter and Spring Quarters.

=== University Concert Band ===
The University Concert Band is directed by Dr. Christopher Heidenreich. Participation in the band is open to music and non-music/band students from all academic colleges on campus without audition. Concerts are held during the Winter and Spring Quarters.

== Events ==
The Band of Pride participates in hundreds of events throughout the academic year. Some of the events include Mardi Gras parades, Christmas parades and much more.

== Music ==
- Tech Fight by James Alvey Smith
- Go Dogs Go by Henry Fillmore
- Sempre Fi by John Philip Sousa
- Grandioso March by Roland F. Seitz
- Alma Mater by John P. Graham, James Alvey Smith
- Fanfare
- It's Hard to Be Humble by Mac Davis
- Talkin’ Out the Side of Your Neck by Cameo
- Rock and Roll by Gary Glitter
