= 1931 Louisiana Normal Tigers football team =

American college football season

1931 Louisiana Normal Tigers football
- Conference: Independent
- Record: 0–1
- Head coach: Ralph Waldo Emerson Jones (2nd season)

The 1931 Louisiana Normal Tigers football team represented Louisiana Negro Normal and Industrial Institute—now known as Grambling State University—as an independent during the 1931 college football season. In their second and final season under head coach Ralph Waldo Emerson Jones, the Tigers lost their only game.

== Schedule ==
Opponent	Site	Result
Arkansas Baptist		L
