= Traditions of Louisiana Tech University =

The traditions of Louisiana Tech University are key aspects to the culture and student life at Louisiana Tech University. The earliest traditions started shortly after the university's founding in the 1890s while other traditions have been introduced more recently. The most notable visible tradition among current students and university alumni is the Lady of the Mist statue and fountain that was constructed in the middle of the Quadrangle in 1938.

Tech XXII, the university's official mascot, is present at all football games and most sporting events and special ceremonies.

== University ==
=== Lady of the Mist ===
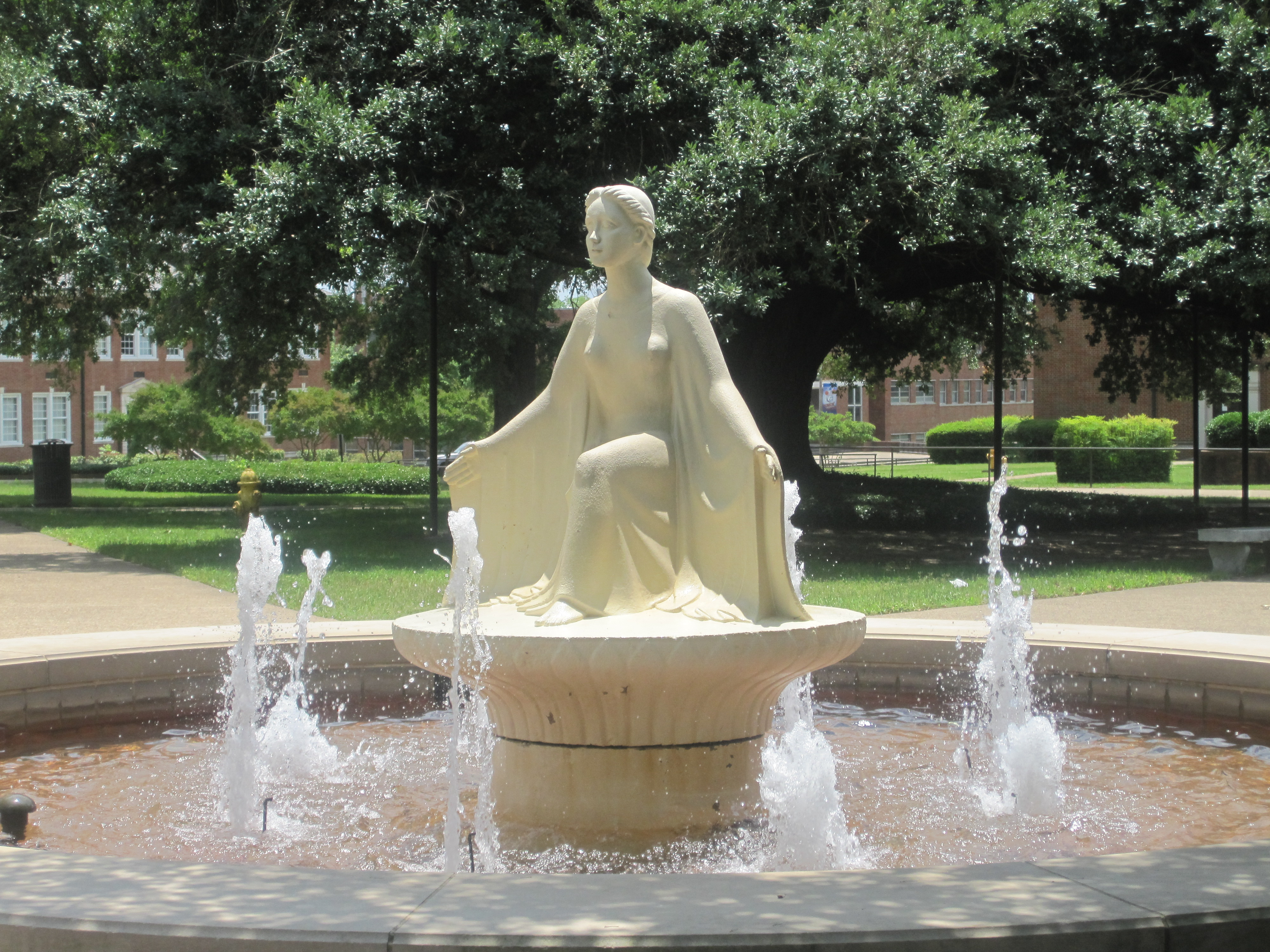
Lady of the Mist

The Lady of the Mist is one of the most recognizable landmarks on the Louisiana Tech Main Campus. The sculpture sits in the midst of a fountain in the middle of the quadrangle (The Quad), one of the focal points of the university and part of the older section of the Main Campus. The Lady of the Mist symbolizes "Alma Mater" who welcomes new students and bids farewell to Tech graduates. The statue also symbolizes the hope that Louisiana Tech graduates will fulfill their ambitions and highest callings in life.

The statue and fountain was funded in 1938 by the Women's Panhellenic Association of Ruston, the governing body of the university's sorority groups. The Lady of the Mist was the idea of Art & Architecture faculty member Mary Moffett and Art Department Chair Elizabeth Bethea. The Lady of the Mist was created by Duncan Ferguson and Jules Struppeck and specifically located in the middle of the Quad facing north toward the old North entrance columns of the Tech campus. This was done to welcome everyone to the campus as people looked through the North entrance columns to see the statue's open arms waiting to greet them.

The Lady fell into disrepair in the years after its construction. In 1985, the statue was restored through the efforts of the Student Government Association, Panhellenic, the Residence Hall Association, and the Association of Women Students. Today, the statue remains a focal point of students and alumni who return to the Tech campus.

=== Tenets of Tech ===
The Tenets of Tech are the twelve tenets that exemplify the qualities that Tech students should possess upon graduation.

- Confidence (confisio)
- Excellence (bonitas)
- Commitment (commendo)
- Knowledge (agnitio)
- Integrity (integritas)
- Respect (adsurgo)
- Leadership (ductus)
- Loyalty (fides)
- Enthusiasm (studium)
- Caring (affectus)
- Hope (spes)
- Pride (spiritus)

=== First-Year Experience Academic Convocation ===
The Lady of the Mist has played an integral part in Louisiana Tech's First-Year Experience Academic Convocation since the first ceremony was held in 2007. Every September during Welcome Week, the ceremony marks the first time the members of the incoming freshmen class come together and the last time they will officially gather together until their graduation. During the Academic Convocation, the freshmen students are introduced to President Leslie K. Guice, university administrators, and distinguished alumni.

Before the convocation ceremony begins, each freshmen student receives a medallion and is expected to hold on to it until the ending of the ceremony where they walk from Howard Auditorium along a candlelit, alumni-lined path to the Lady of the Mist. When the freshmen students reach the Lady of the Mist, they deposit the medallions into the fountain as a symbol of their own investment in themselves and Louisiana Tech. Upon graduation from Louisiana Tech, the student will receive the medallion during the commencement ceremony. Each medallion has a picture of the Lady of the Mist on the front and the Tenets of Tech on the back.

=== Tower Medallion ===
Since 1977, the Tower Medallion has been awarded each spring at the May Commencement ceremony to outstanding alumni of Louisiana Tech that are named to the Hall of Distinguished Alumni. The Medallion honors Tech alumni who have distinguished themselves by "exceptional achievement, community service, and humanitarian activities." The award recognizes those Tech alumni who have brought honor to themselves and the university and provides the medallion's recipients with permanent recognition in the Louisiana Tech University Hall of Distinguished Alumni.

Recipients of the Tower Medallion in the past include Terry Bradshaw (1979), Kix Brooks (2002), Karl Malone (2005), former U.S. House Representative Joe Waggonner (1977), CenturyLink President and CEO Glen Post (1997), and former Louisiana Tech President Dr. F. Jay Taylor (1997).

== Nicknames ==
=== Bulldogs ===
Tech XX

The legend of the Louisiana Tech Bulldog dates back to the Fall of 1899. The story involves five Tech students on their way home from class. When they reached the edge of campus, they noticed a quiet old bulldog sitting alone under a tree. Assuming the dog was a stray, they fed him all the food they had with them and continued on their way.

When the young men had reached the boarding house where they were living, one of them discovered that the bulldog had followed them. They all liked the bulldog and decided not to send him away. They received permission from the owner of the house to keep the dog and to let him sleep in the kitchen for the night. However, they would have to make other plans the next day.

During the night, a fire broke out in the house and the bulldog was the first to be awakened. The old dog became alarmed and ran from room to room tugging at the sheets of the bed to wake the students and the owner. Once the owner and the students had assembled outside, they were horrified to discover that one boy was still in the house. By this time, the house was almost completely full of smoke. Before the boys had time to react, they saw the bulldog run back into the burning house. Moments later, the final student ran out to safety. They all waited for the bulldog to come back out, but it never did.

By dawn the fire was out and the boys searched what remained of the house in hopes of finding the old bulldog alive. After a short time, they found the old dog lying in an unburned corner of the house. The smoke and heat had been too much, and the heroic dog just did not make it.

With tears in their eyes, the young men picked up the lifeless body, and without saying a word, began to walk back to the campus. When they reached the tree where they had met the bulldog only the day before, they began to dig a grave.

Soon, the news of the stray old bulldog spread across the Tech campus. Everyone grieved and felt a closeness to the bulldog that most of them never knew. A loving old bulldog had become the first Tech hero.

A year after the death of the bulldog, Tech began making plans to start its first football team and needed a mascot. The students voted unanimously to become the Bulldogs in honor of Tech's first hero.

Today, no one is sure where the old bulldog is buried or of the names of the young men who saved it. However, one thing is certain. The spirit of the dog is still very much alive, and the love and loyalty it displayed has been a trademark of Tech people for many generations. Questions about the events long ago will always exist, but be assured that somewhere on the Tech campus are the remains of a brave old bulldog.

=== Lady Techsters ===
I just didn't want us to be the Lady Bulldogs. I could hear people saying, "There comes Coach Hogg and all of her little b!+¢#ə$."

— Former head coach Sonja Hogg on the Lady Techsters nickname in 2009

In 1974, Louisiana Tech President F. Jay Taylor established the university's first women's athletic program, a women's basketball team. He hired a 28-year-old P.E. teacher at Ruston High School, Sonja Hogg, as the program's first head coach. However, Hogg refused to call her team the Lady Bulldogs after the La Tech men's nickname. She asserted that bulldogs were "unfeminine" and that "a lady dog is a b!+¢#." For that reason, her first initiative as head coach was to nix the nickname Bulldogs from any connection with her team. Thus, Hogg decided to change her team's nickname to the Lady Techsters.

We always have to look like ladies.

— Point guard Kim Mulkey on being a Lady Techster in 1983

Hogg would not allow her Lady Techsters to wear knee or elbow pads because they were unladylike. Additionally, she designed the Lady Techster jerseys with sleeves because she did not like her ladies showing their armpits or bra straps. By requiring her players to be ladylike, Hogg created an "almost antebellum image" of the Lady Techsters. A 1986 Sports Illustrated article stated, "A Lady Techster is likely to be a good student and a devout Christian, probably favors needlepoint over Madonna tapes on airplanes and fears a drug test about as much as she does an airport metal detector."

== Mascots ==
=== Tech ===
Champ

Tech is the name of the fawn and white lineage of English bulldogs, which serves as the live mascot of Louisiana Tech University. Tech is owned by the Louisiana Tech Student Government Association and resides with either a faculty member or local alumnus selected by the SGA.

== Football ==
=== Spirit of '88 ===
At the south end of Joe Aillet Stadium stands a bronze Bulldog statue named the Spirit of '88. The statue commemorates the 1988 Bulldog football team which blazed the path into Division I-A football for Louisiana Tech. That 1988 team had to endure one of the most difficult schedules in school history while playing with only 65 scholarships - the allotted amount for Division I-AA teams. In what was the nation's 11th toughest schedule that year, the Bulldogs faced five I-A bowl teams including Houston, Florida State and Texas A&M. The results were as expected: losses like 60–0, 56-17 and 66-3 ... but as a team, the Bulldogs grew. Those experiences likely played a key role in Tech finishing 5-4-1 the following year, its first in Division I-A, and then 8-3-1 in 1990 and an Independence Bowl berth. The statue, which every Bulldog player touches as he walks down the ramp before every home game, has also brought good fortune to the Bulldogs at Joe Aillet Stadium. On October 14, 1989, when it was unveiled, Tech proceeded to pummel a highly respected Northern Illinois team by the score of 42–21. That was just the start of one of the best runs in Tech football history.

The Spirit of '88 Bulldog

Over the next four-plus seasons, home games were few and far between, but each one resulted in a win. The Bulldogs eventually reeled off 18 consecutive home victories, tying the all-time stadium record set by head coach Maxie Lambright's great teams of the early 1970s. Some wins have been more magical than others. The endings to three of the biggest wins in school history have taken place in the south endzone ... almost as if the Spirit of '88 willed the Bulldogs to victory. In 1990, only Louisiana Tech's second season in the Division I-A ranks, the Bulldogs trailed Colorado State 30-14 late in the third quarter and their bowl hopes looked bleak. However, 17 unanswered points later, Tech had rallied for a 31–30 win over the bowl-bound Rams to earn their own Independence Bowl berth. The winning touchdown pass from Gene Johnson to Bobby Slaughter in the final minutes came fittingly in the south end zone, just in front of the Spirit of '88. Eleven years later, Tech clinched a share of its first Western Athletic Conference title with a 48–42 win over Boise State at Joe Aillet Stadium. With the Broncos driving towards what looked like a game-winning score late in the contest, the Spirit of '88 magic struck once again. Ryan Dinwiddie's potential game-winning touchdown pass bounced off the helmet of a Tech defender and high into the air before Bulldog defensive lineman Brandon Avance plucked it out of the air, giving Tech the victory.

Some might say it's a coincidence that the two biggest wins in the program's Division I-A history had been decided in the south end zone under the watchful eyes of the Spirit of '88. However, the third time proved it was more than just chance. On a warm October 2 evening in 2004, Louisiana Tech found itself trailing No. 17 ranked Fresno State 21-20 late in the fourth quarter. Fresno State had the football and the momentum, trying to move out of its own end zone—the south end zone—against a Tech defense and its 12th man, or should we say Dawg. However, under the watchful eyes of the Spirit of '88, the Tech defense and offense would both strike. On third down Fresno State quarterback Paul Pinegar was intercepted by Byron Santiago who returned the football down to the 16-yard line. Two plays later, Ryan Moats gave Tech a 28–21 lead and the eventual win as he rushed eight yards to the right corner of the south end zone. The Bulldogs had defeated the 17th-ranked team in the nation. A Joe Aillet Stadium crowd celebrated wildly with the Tech players, coaches and the Spirit of '88. Some may say the powers of that bronze Bulldog are a fluke. Tech fans won't agree. The numbers say 59 wins and just 20 losses since the Spirit of '88 was unveiled. So fluke or not, the Bulldogs will continue to touch it each home game and hope the wins continue.

=== Fire Bell ===
Fire Bell and Tech XX

In 1879, the Fire Bell was cast by L.M. Rumsey & Co. in St. Louis, Missouri. Founded in 1897, the Ruston Fire Department was called to fires by ringing the Fire Bell that hung in a wooden tower behind Perkins Drug Store located at 116 N. Trenton Street. The Fire Bell was used for many years in Ruston to alert the town of burning fires. After Joe Aillet Stadium was built in 1968, the old Fire Bell was transported to the stadium atop the hill in the south end zone. The Fire Bell is rung before every football game to commemorate the bravery of the bulldog that perished saving the lives of the two Tech students in the burning house in 1899, and the Fire Bell calls the Bulldogs to battle before every home football game.

=== Homecoming Week ===
Louisiana Tech holds their Homecoming Week activities every October. Homecoming Week events start with Paint the Town, the Union Board Talent Show, and the Unity Step Show. The week culminates with the Homecoming Parade through the Tech campus and downtown Ruston on Thursday, a Pep Rally at the Thomas Assembly Center on Friday, and the Homecoming game on Saturday.

The university also recognizes the year's most distinguished alumni. Each year, Tech picks an Alumnus of the Year, Young Alumnus of the Year, and Alumnus of the Year from each college based on their achievements, and close ties with their community and Louisiana Tech.

Over the last few years, the Louisiana Tech Alumni Band has joined the Band of Pride at the Tech Homecoming game. Members of the Alumni Band march into Joe Aillet Stadium with the Band of Pride and perform alongside the BOP during the football game.

The first Homecoming football game was played in 1925 when Louisiana Tech lost to Southwestern Louisiana 22–13. In eighty-one Homecoming football games played in Louisiana Tech's history, Tech has compiled a 59-20-2 record.

== Women's basketball ==
=== Columbia blue ===
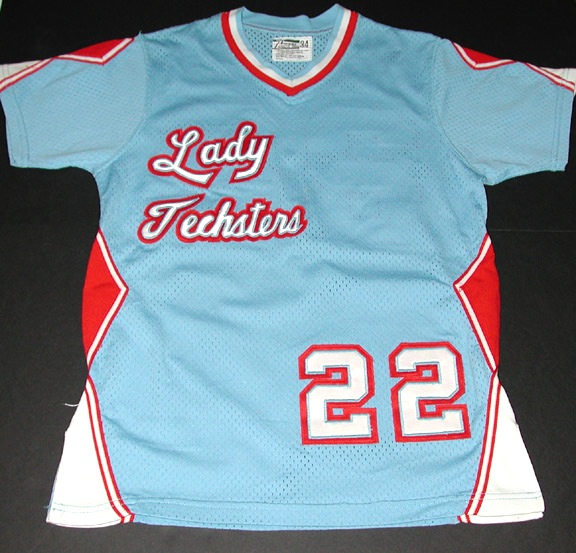
Columbia blue Lady Techster jersey with sleeves

In 1896, Col. A.T. Prescott, president of what was then Louisiana Polytechnic Institute, announced the selection of red and blue as the institution's colors. Red was chosen to represent courage, and blue was selected to embody loyalty. In the 1960s, Columbia blue was introduced to Louisiana Tech in various applications. In 1974, Sonja Hogg, along with the head of the university's art department, Raymond Nichols, presented various shades of blue to the athletics council, and Hogg's preference of Columbia blue was adopted as the primary color of the Lady Techsters. Prior to 2003, the university's teams, departments, and organizations used various shades of blue ranging from light blue to dark blue. Yet in 2003, Louisiana Tech standardized its shade of blue by adopting reflex blue as the official hue. However, due to La Tech's rich tradition in women's basketball, the Lady Techsters basketball team was granted the only exemption to not adopt reflex blue and was allowed to continue to use the traditional Columbia blue.

=== Jersey sleeves ===
In 1974, Sonja Hogg designed the first Lady Techster jerseys with sleeves because she did not want her ladies showing their armpits. In addition, sports bras did not exist in 1974, and Hogg did not want spectators to see her ladies' bra straps hanging out of sleeveless jerseys either. As Lady Techster basketball rose to national prominence, the jersey sleeves became recognized as part of the Lady Techster brand. Sleeves were a staple of the Lady Techsters jerseys throughout Leon Barmore's tenure as head coach. After Barmore retired in 2002, new head coach Kurt Budke introduced the first Lady Techsters sleeveless jerseys at the behest of the players.
