= Earl Larkin Williams =

American mathematician and astronomer

Earl Larkin Williams (August 22, 1903 – February 7, 1974) was an American astronomer and mathematician.

== Early life and education ==
Williams was born August 22, 1903. He received his A.B. in 1924 and his A.M. a year later, both from Swarthmore College. He also studied at the University of Pennsylvania, Ohio State University, and the University of Michigan.

== Career ==
In addition to working at The George Washington University, Williams held positions as an Instructor in Mathematics and Astronomy at Muhlenberg College (1925–1926), Instructor of Astronomy at Ohio State University (1920–1931) and Assistant Professor of Astronomy at Denison University for one semester in 1931. Beyond his employment as a professor, Williams also held a position as the Assistant Latitude Observer of United States Coast and Geodetic Survey, operating an observatory at Gaithersburg, Maryland, from 1932 to 1941. He was a member of the American Astronomical Society, the International Astronomical Union, the American Geophysical Union, Gamma Alpha, Sigma Xi (associate), and Pi Delta Epsilon. He wrote a few newspaper articles in 1941 on total solar eclipse expeditions. He also wrote in 1935 "On the Instrumental Adjustment of a Zenith Telescope" in the Transactions of the International Astronomical Union, in which he proposed a new method of offsetting the effect of flexure by making the middle thread of a telescope follow the meridian precisely at all zenith distances. Williams was appointed as an Associate of Mathematics at The George Washington University in 1941. In 1945, he became a Lecturer in Mathematics until 1948. He again became an Associate of Mathematics from 1948 through 1949. He then was a Lecturer in Mathematics from 1949 until his resignation from the university on January 31, 1955.

== Death and afterward ==
According to the obituary in The Washington Post, Williams died on February 7, 1974, and his buried was handled by the Gartner Sandison Funeral Home in Maryland. Because The George Washington University employed him for only 14 years and only as a Lecturer and Associate in Mathematics, there is limited knowledge about his accomplishments. He is mentioned in the 1946 Cherry Tree Yearbook as a member of the mathematics faculty at the university and he is mentioned in the 1946 George Washington University Bulletin. The only information on Williams' achievements at The George Washington University is found in his personal records in the archives section of its library.

== Marriage and children ==
Williams married Helen Ball Shawaker on June 9, 1931, in Columbus, Ohio, where she had been born on May 12, 1905, the daughter of Frank Albert Schauweker. The couple had four children: Judith Jane, Keith, Linda A., and Greg. Helen died on March 29, 1972, in Gaithersburg, Maryland. Earl, Helen, and Greg were cremated and their cremains are with Linda in Vermont.
