= Alpha Chi Alpha (recognition) =

American journalism society (1919–1944)

- ΑΧΑ
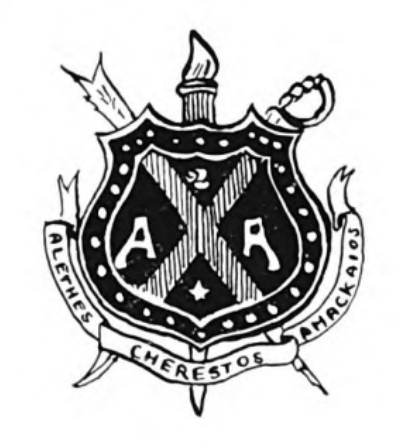
- Coat of Arms Alpha Chi Alpha
- Founded: December 17, 1919; 106 years ago University of Tennessee
- Type: Recognition
- Affiliation: Independent
- Status: Merged
- Merge date: July 1, 1944
- Successor: Pi Delta Epsilon
- Emphasis: Journalism
- Scope: National
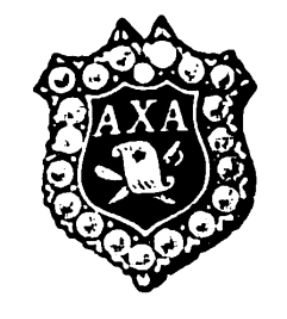
- Member badge
- Colors: Gold and White
- Flower: Yellow rose
- Publication: The Al-Cri
- Chapters: 14
- Headquarters: United States

Alpha Chi Alpha (ΑΧΑ) was an American recognition society for women in the field of journalism. It was established in 1919 at the University of Tennessee in Knoxville, Tennessee. Alpha Chi Alpha established fourteen chapters before merging into Pi Delta Epsilon in 1944.

== History ==
Alpha Chi Alpha International Collegiate Honorary Journalistic Fraternity was founded at the University of Tennessee in Knoxville, Tennessee on December 17, 1919. It was created as an honorary women's fraternity to recognize women who were active in collegiate publications and to advance the study of journalism. It was considered a sister fraternity to Pi Delta Epsilon, a journalism honor fraternity for men.

Alpha Chi Alpha became a national organization in 1921 when chapters were established at Franklin College, Florida State College for Women, and Ripon College. These were followed by chapters at Northwestern University and University of Southern California in 1924, and at Colorado Agricultural College in 1925. In 1926, chapters were chartered at Carnegie Institute of Technology, Cornell University, and Georgetown College.

Alpha Chi Alpha was reorganized in 1928. In 1929, following the establishment of a chapter at Salem College, the honor sorority had seven active and four inactive chapters. The organization held biennial annual meetings, with the fourth meeting being held in Los Angeles, California, in July 1936. In December 1938, the society held its first national Alpha Chi Alpha Week, featuring discussions about the press at campuses with chapters.

In 1940, Alpha Chi Alpha had grown to include nine active and five inactive chapters. On June 31 and July 1–2, 1944, the fraternity's national convention was held in Vermillion, South Dakota. On July 1, 1944, Alpha Chi Alpha voted to merge into Pi Delta Epsilon. (Note: Pi Delta Epsilon voted to admit women in 1937.)

== Symbols ==
Alpha Chi Alpha's badge was shield-shaped, with the Greek letters "ΑΧΑ" over a crossed sword and quill superimposed on a scroll, with a star on the upper part of the scroll on the background of black enamel. Its colors were gold and white, replacing its original colors of orange and white. Its flower was a yellow rose, replacing the daisy that was its original flower. Its publication was The Al-Cri, published three times an academic year.

== Membership ==
Membership was open to women who had worked for at least one and a half years for a collegiate publication.

== Chapters ==
Following are the chapters of Alpha Chi Alpha, with inactive chapters in italics.

Chapter	Charter date and range	Institutions	Location	Status	Ref.
Alpha	1919	University of Tennessee	Knoxville, Tennessee	Merged (ΠΔΕ)	
Beta	February 1921	Franklin College	Franklin, Indiana	Inactive	(Note: Chapter formed from the Women's Press Club of Franklin College.)
Gamma	1921	Florida State College for Women	Tallahassee, Florida	Merged (ΠΔΕ)	
Delta	1921	Ripon College	Ripon, Wisconsin	Merged (ΠΔΕ)	
Epsilon	1924	Northwestern University	Evanston, Illinois	Inactive	
Zeta	1924	University of Southern California	Los Angeles, California	Merged (ΠΔΕ)	
Eta	October 1925	Colorado Agricultural College	Fort Collins, Colorado	Merged (ΠΔΕ)	(Note: Chapter formed from Alpha Chi, a local women's journalism fraternity.)
Theta	1926	Carnegie Institute of Technology	Pittsburgh, Pennsylvania	Merged (ΠΔΕ)	
Iota	1926	Cornell University	Ithaca, New York	Inactive	
Kappa	1926	Georgetown College	Georgetown, Kentucky	Inactive	
Lambda	1929	Salem College	Winston-Salem, North Carolina	Merged (ΠΔΕ)	
Mu	May 1, 1930	University of South Dakota	Vermillion, South Dakota	Merged (ΠΔΕ)	(Note: The chapter formed from Theta Delta Pi (local), a women's journalistic fraternity established in 1925, to join a national organization.)
Nu	1933	University of California at Los Angeles	Los Angeles, California	Merged (ΠΔΕ)	
Xi				Unassigned	
Omicron	1938	Alabama College, State College for Women	Montevallo, Alabama	Merged (ΠΔΕ)	

== Notable members ==
- Zona Gale, novelist, short story writer, playwright, and the first woman to win the Pulitzer Prize for Drama
- Mary Holland Kinkaid (honorary), novelist and journalist

== See also ==
- Honor society
- Professional fraternities and sororities
