= Omega Xi Alpha =

Journalism fraternity in California (1928)

- ΩΞΑ
- Founded: January 14, 1927; 99 years ago Los Angeles, California
- Type: Honor
- Affiliation: Independent
- Status: Merged
- Merge date: September 1929
- Successor: Alpha Phi Gamma
- Emphasis: Journalism
- Scope: Regional
- Colors: Black and Gold
- Chapters: 7
- Headquarters: , California; United States

Omega Xi Alpha (ΩΞΑ) was a regional honorary journalism fraternity that was established in 1927 in California, United States. It merged with Alpha Phi Gamma two years later, in 1929.

== History ==
In early 1927, John "Jack" Allen Smith of Santa Barbara State and Robert Whitesides of the University of Redlands began working together to form a fraternity for the staff of college newspapers. Omega Xi Alpha was established as a co-educational honorary journalism fraternity at a convention at the University Club in Los Angeles, California on January 14, 1927. At the meeting, 25 representatives from six colleges signed a charter, adopted a constitution, and elected officers. Whitesides became its first president and Smith was its secretary. Faculty from the various institutions served on a board of auditors.

The purpose of Omega Xi Alpha was:

To recognize individual ability and achievement in journalistic pursuits in colleges and universities; to encourage the production of literary works; to establish cordial intercourse between students and members of the profession; and to foster a spirit of brotherhood among those of kindred interest.

At convention, the Greek letter chapter names were assigned to the chapters. Its seven charter members were California Institute of Technology, California Polytechnic School, Fresno State Teacher's College, Santa Barbara State Teachers College, Southwestern University, University of Redlands, and Whittier College. At the time, it was the only national honorary journalism fraternity to include men and women members.

Omega Xi Alpha sponsored a contest for the best college newspaper of the year, with judges from the Los Angeles Times and the Alhambra Post-Advocate. Chapters held meetings and brought speakers from the journalism profession to campus. The fraternity's second national convention was held at the University of Redlands on January 11 and 12, 1929.

In the spring of 1929, Omega Xi Alpha began merger discussions with Alpha Phi Gamma, a national journalism honor fraternity established in 1919. The two officially merged with the opening fall semester in September 1929, under the Alpha Phi Gamma name. Smith assisted with revising the constitution and rituals for Alpha Phi Gamma as part of the merger. Omega Xi Alpha's chapter became the western division of Alpha Phi Gamma, with Smith serving as the region's president.

== Symbols ==
Members of Omega Xi Alpha received a membership key that featured the Greek letters ΩΞΑ. On the back, the key was engraved with its member's unique number. Its crest was black and gold.

== Membership ==
Membership in Omega Xi Alpha was open to men and women who had worked on a college publication for one year. In addition, potential members were required to be in the top half of their class and to be active in campus activities.

== Chapters ==
Following were the chapters of Omega Xi Alpha at the time of its merger with Alpha Phi Gamma.

Chapter	Charter date and range	Institution	Location	Status	Ref.
Alpha	January 14, 1927 – September 1929	University of Redlands	Redlands, California	Merged (ΑΦΓ)	(Note: Became the Lambda chapter of Alpha Phi Gamma.)
Beta	January 14, 1927 – September 1929	California Institute of Technology	Pasadena, California	Merged (ΑΦΓ)	(Note: Became the Mu chapter of Alpha Phi Gamma.)
Gamma	January 14, 1927 – September 1929	Southwestern University	Los Angeles, California	Merged (ΑΦΓ)	(Note: Became the Nu chapter of Alpha Phi Gamma.)
Delta	January 14, 1927 – September 1929	Whittier College	Whittier, California	Merged (ΑΦΓ)	(Note: Became the Xi chapter of Alpha Phi Gamma.)
Epsilon	January 14, 1927 – September 1929	Fresno State Teacher's College	Fresno, California	Merged (ΑΦΓ)	(Note: Became the Omicron chapter of Alpha Phi Gamma.)
Zeta	January 14, 1927 – September 1929	California Polytechnic School	San Luis Obispo County, California	Inactive	
Eta	January 14, 1927 – September 1929	Santa Barbara State Teachers College	Santa Barbara, California	Merged (ΑΦΓ)	(Note: Chapter formed from a local campus organization.) (Note: Became the Pi chapter of Alpha Phi Gamma.)

== See also ==
- Professional fraternities and sororities
