= Les Guice =

American academic administrator

Leslie K. Guice

President of Louisiana Tech University
- In office July 1, 2013 – December 31, 2023
- Preceded by: Dan Reneau
- Succeeded by: Jim Henderson

Personal details
- Born: December 23, 1954 (age 71) Monroe, Louisiana
- Spouse: Kathy Guice
- Children: 3 sons
- Education: Louisiana Tech University (BS, MS); Texas A&M University (PhD)
- Profession: University President

Leslie Keith Guice (born December 23, 1954) served as the 14th president of Louisiana Tech University in Ruston, Louisiana. Guice, who holds a Ph.D. in Civil Engineering, succeeded Dan Reneau as the Louisiana Tech president after a long career at the institution as a student, professor, dean, and vice president of research.

== Education ==
In 1976, Guice received his Bachelor of Arts degree in architecture from Louisiana Tech University. He remained at Louisiana Tech until 1978, when he received a master's degree in Civil Engineering and immediately moved to a position as an assistant professor in Tech's department of Civil Engineering. While still employed at Tech, he completed a Ph.D. in Civil Engineering at Texas A&M University in College Station, Texas.

== Career ==
Not long after completing his doctorate, Guice was appointed the head of the Civil Engineering department. By 1999, he was the Dean of the College of Engineering and Science. In 2004, he became the Vice President for Research and Development, and on November 29, 2012, Guice was announced as the 14th President of Louisiana Tech University. He announced his intention to retire by the end of the year in September 2023.

== Personal life ==
Guice was inducted in 1978 into the Louisiana Gamma chapter of the Tau Beta Pi at Louisiana Tech University.

Guice has 3 sons - Chad, Kyle and Bret.
