= Alpha Eta Mu Beta =

American biomedical engineering honor society

- ΑΗΜΒ
- Founded: 1979; 47 years ago Louisiana Tech University
- Type: Honor
- Affiliation: ACHS
- Status: Active
- Emphasis: Biomedical Engineering
- Scope: National (US)
- Colors: Red and Gold
- Publication: AEMB Newsletter
- Chapters: 40
- Headquarters: 2602 CR 600 East; Mahomet, Illinois 61853; United States
- Website: alphaetamubeta.org

Alpha Eta Mu Beta (ΑΗΜΒ or AEMB) is an American biomedical engineering honor society. It was founded at Louisiana Tech University in Ruston, Louisiana in 1979 and has expanded to include forty chapters. It is a member of the Association of College Honor Societies.

== History ==
Daniel Reneau, head of the biomedical engineering department of Louisiana Tech University, founded Alpha Eta Mu Beta in 1979. It is an honor society for students studying biomedical engineering.

A second chapter was established at Tulane University in 1980. It became a national society in 1988 with the establishment of a chapter at the University of Iowa. It has since chartered 40 chapters across the United States. It became a member of the Association of College Honor Societies in 2013.

Alpha Eta Mu Beta's national headquarters is at 2602 CR 600 East in Mahomet, Illinois.

== Symbols ==
The society's colors are red and gold. Its publication is the AEMB Newsletter.

== Membership ==
Membership in Alpha Eta Mu Beta is open to juniors, seniors, and graduate students. Membership of AEMB is offered to the top fifth of juniors and top third of seniors in biomedical engineering, who have completed at least six semester credit hours (or the equivalent) of biomedical engineering courses. Graduate students must be in the top third of their class and have authored a professional publication.

== Chapters ==
Following is a list of the chapters of Alpha Eta Mu.

Charter date	Institution	City	State	Status	Ref.
1979	Louisiana Tech University	Ruston	Louisiana	Active	
1980	Tulane University	New Orleans	Louisiana	Active	
1988	University of Iowa	Iowa City	Iowa	Active	
1993	Marquette University	Milwaukee	Wisconsin	Active	
1994	Milwaukee School of Engineering	Milwaukee	Wisconsin	Active	
1994	Arizona State University	Phoenix	Arizona	Active	
1994	Boston University	Boston	Massachusetts	Active	
1996	Johns Hopkins University	Baltimore	Maryland	Active	
1998	Vanderbilt University	Nashville	Tennessee	Active	
1998	Texas A&M University	College Station	Texas	Active	
2002	Rensselaer Polytechnic Institute	Troy	New York	Active	
2002	University of Miami	Coral Gables	Florida	Active	
2003	Washington University in St. Louis	St. Louis	Missouri	Active	
2003	University of Pittsburgh	Pittsburgh	Pennsylvania	Active	
2003	University of Illinois at Chicago	Chicago	Illinois	Active	
2005	Virginia Commonwealth University	Richmond	Virginia	Active	
2005	Georgia Institute of Technology	Atlanta	Georgia	Active	
2005	University of Wisconsin–Madison	Madison	Wisconsin	Active	
2005	Case Western Reserve University	Cleveland	Ohio	Active	
2005	University of Rochester	Rochester	New York	Active	
2006	University of Pennsylvania	Philadelphia	Pennsylvania	Active	
2007	Florida International University	University Park	Florida	Active	
2007	Worcester Polytechnic Institute	Worcester	Massachusetts	Active	
2010	University of Connecticut	Storrs	Connecticut	Active	
2010	Pennsylvania State University	University Park	Pennsylvania	Active	
2010	North Carolina State University	Raleigh	North Carolina	Active	
2010	New Jersey Institute of Technology	Newark	New Jersey	Active	
2010	Purdue University	West Lafayette	Indiana	Active	
2011	Clemson University	Clemson	South Carolina	Active	
2011	Rutgers University	New Brunswick	New Jersey	Active	
2011	Drexel University	Philadelphia	Pennsylvania	Active	
2012	Lawrence Technological University	Southfield	Michigan	Active	
2012	Stevens Institute of Technology	Hoboken	New Jersey	Active	
2012	Florida Gulf Coast University	Lee County	Florida	Active	
2013	University of California, Irvine	Irvine	California	Active	
2013	University of Tennessee	Knoxville	Tennessee	Active	
2013	Ohio State University	Columbus	Ohio	Active	
2014	St. Louis University	St. Louis	Missouri	Active	
2014	University of Hartford	West Hartford	Connecticut	Active	
2014	University of Texas at Austin	Austin	Texas	Active	
2015	Binghamton University	Binghamton	New York	Active	
2015	University of Maryland, College Park	College Park	Maryland	Active	
2015	Catholic University of America	Washington, D.C.		Active	
2015	University of Memphis	Memphis	Tennessee	Active	
2015	University of Illinois	Champaign and Urbana	Illinois	Active	
2015	Indiana Institute of Technology	Fort Wayne	Indiana	Active	
2015	Stony Brook University	Stony Brook	New York	Active	
2017	University of South Carolina	Columbia	South Carolina	Active	
2017	East Carolina University	Greenville	North Carolina	Active	
2018	Florida Institute of Technology	Melbourne	Florida	Active	
2018	University of Arkansas	Fayetteville	Arkansas	Active	

== Notable members ==
- Dan Reneau, president of Louisiana Tech University

== See also ==
- Honor society
- Professional fraternities and sororities
