= Alpha Delta (recognition) =

American journalism honor fraternity (1929–1957)

- ΑΔ
- Founded: December 28, 1929; 96 years ago Rock Island, Illinois
- Type: Honor
- Former affiliation: Independent
- Status: Merged
- Merge date: Spring 1957
- Successor: Alpha Phi Gamma
- Emphasis: Journalism
- Scope: National
- Colors: Blue and Silver
- Chapters: 19
- Headquarters: Rock Island, Illinois; United States

Alpha Delta (ΑΔ) was an American journalism honor fraternity or recognition society. It formed on December 28, 1929, at Rock Island, Illinois. It merged into Alpha Phi Gamma in 1957.

== History ==
Alpha Delta was formed on December 28, 1929, at Rock Island, Illinois by students who were leaders within the Illinois College Press Association and the editor-in-chiefs or business managers of campus newspapers. Its founders included Robert Aykens of the Illinois Wesleyan Argus, Oliver W. Connett of The Bradley Tech, Newell H. Dailey of the Augustana Observer, Howard Dunker of The Bradley Tech, Edward V. Hanh of the Illinois Wesleyan Argus, and Floyd F. Johnston of the Augustana Observer.

The purpose of Alpha Delta was as a journalism recognition society for both men and women; it was also called an honorary fraternity. It was chartered by the State of Illinois as a non-profit organization on February 7, 1930. It was governed by a national council elected at a national convention that included two representatives of each chapter.

The Illinois Alpha chapter at Augustana College was installed in March 1930. This was followed by chapters at Bradley University, Illinois Wesleyan University, Parsons College, and Brenau University that same year. The society grew to include nineteen chapters in nine chapters between 1930 and 1957. It sponsored a national competition for college journalism excellence, presenting keys to the winners. The chapters' activities included hosting speakers and organizing educational conferences for high school journalists.

In the spring of 1957 (after February 21 and before May 10), Alpha Delta merged into Alpha Phi Gamma, a larger journalism honor society.

== Symbols ==
The Alpha Delta badge was a key with concave corners, decorated with a quill, scroll, and hourglass above the Greek letters ΑΔ. Its colors were blue and silver.

== Membership ==
Membership in Alpha Delta was open to men and women. Potential members were required to demonstrate proficiency in journalism by having served one year on the staff of a college newspaper or in the study of journalism. The fraternity also initiated honorary members, including faculty.

== Chapters ==
Following is a list of Alpha Delta chapters, with inactive chapters and institutions in italics.

Chapter	Charter date and range	Institution	Location	Status	Ref.
Illinois Alpha	March 8, 1930	Augustana College	Rock Island, Illinois	Inactive	
Illinois Beta	1930	Bradley University	Peoria, Illinois	Inactive	
Illinois Gamma	1930–1932	Illinois Wesleyan University	Bloomington, Illinois	Inactive	
Iowa Alpha	1930–1931	Parsons College	Fairfield, Iowa	Inactive	(Note: Parsons College ceased operations in 1973 over financial stress.)
Georgia Alpha	1930	Brenau University	Gainesville, Georgia	Inactive	
Illinois Delta	1933–1950	Wheaton College	Wheaton, Illinois	Inactive	
Georgia Beta	1937–1941	Georgia State Women's College	Valdosta, Georgia	Inactive	
Colorado Alpha	1939	Colorado State College	Greeley, Colorado	Inactive	
Wisconsin Alpha	1941	St. Norbert College	De Pere, Wisconsin	Inactive	
Illinois Epsilon	1941	Western Illinois University	Macomb, Illinois	Inactive	
Illinois Zeta	1942–1957	Northern Illinois University	DeKalb, Illinois	Merged (ΑΦΓ)	(Note: Became the Beta Rho chapter of Alpha Phi Gamma after the national merger of the two fraternities.)
Michigan Alpha	1947–1957	Central Michigan University	Mount Pleasant, Michigan	Merged (ΑΦΓ)	(Note: Became the Beta Sigma chapter of Alpha Phi Gamma after the national merger of the two fraternities.)
Illinois Eta	1949	Knox College	Galesburg, Illinois	Inactive	
Oklahoma Alpha	1950–1952 ?; 1954	East Central University	Ada, Oklahoma	Inactive	
South Dakota Alpha	1950	South Dakota School of Mines and Technology	Rapid City, South Dakota	Inactive	
Michigan Beta	1951	Ferris State University	Big Rapids, Michigan	Inactive	
Oklahoma Beta	1951	Phillips University	Enid, Oklahoma	Inactive	(Note: The university closed in 1998.)
Wisconsin Beta	1951	University of Wisconsin–Milwaukee	Milwaukee, Wisconsin	Inactive	
Illinois Theta	1951	Illinois State University	Normal, Illinois	Inactive	

== See also ==
- Honor society
