= Pi Delta Epsilon =

American honor fraternity for journalism (1909–1975)

- ΠΔΕ
- Pi Delta Epsilon key
- Founded: 1909; 117 years ago Syracuse University
- Type: Honor
- Affiliation: Independent
- Status: Merged
- Merge date: June 1, 1975
- Successor: Society for Collegiate Journalists
- Emphasis: Journalism
- Scope: National
- Colors: Olive green and Gray
- Flower: White Carnation
- Chapters: 174
- Members: 42,000+ lifetime
- Headquarters: Pittsburgh, Pennsylvania; United States

Pi Delta Epsilon (ΠΔΕ) was an American collegiate honor fraternity for journalism. It merged to form the Society for Collegiate Journalists in 1975.

== History ==
Pi Delta Epsilon was established in 1909 at Syracuse University by ten students who were on the staff of The Daily Orange. The founders wanted to form a closer bond around their common interest in journalism. The founders of Pi Delta Epsilon were J. H. Lloyd Baxter, Paul i. Benjamin, C. Earl Bradbury, Sydney H. Coleman, Neil Dow Cranmer, Willard R. Jillison, William M. Kennedy, Philip S. Perkins, Wallace M. Williams, and Donald J. Wormer.

The purpose of Pi Delta Epsilon was to advance journalism, support student publications, foster a fraternal bond, encourage loyalty to the university, and reward journalistic accomplishments. Its mission included "service and sacrifice of self".

Pi Delta Epsilon expanded to include chapters across the United States, beginning with a chapter at the University of Nebraska in 1910. It sponsored an annual national intercollegiate editorial and news story competition; winners received gold, silver, and bronze medals. In later years, there was a prize and a trophy.

Pi Delta Epsilon was governed by a grand council, elected at biennial grand conventions. The fraternity changed its constitution at the 1937 convention to allow female members. It merged with the women's journalism society, Alpha Chi Alpha, on July 1, 1944, accepting all chapters of the former women's recognition society. By 1963, Pi Delta Epsilon had chartered 135 chapters (103 were active) and had initiated 42,000 members.

In 1956, Louis Ingelhart, the president of a similar organization Alpha Phi Gamma, contacted Pi Delta Epsilon and other collegiate journalism organizations to propose a merger. It merged with Alpha Phi Gamma to form the Society for Collegiate Journalists formed on June 1, 1975. At the time of the merger, it was the oldest honorary collegiate journalism fraternity in the United States.

== Symbols ==
The society's badge was a hexagonal gold key with a black enamel face. The Greek letters ΠΔΕ were inscribed on its face as an inverted triangle, with ΠΔ above Ε. Pi Delta Epsilon's colors were olive green and grey. Its flower was the white carnation. Its quarterly publication was The College Publisher.

== Membership ==
Members of Pi Delta Epsilon were required to have served at least one year in the editorial or business department of an accredited campus publication. Thus, membership was open to sophomores, juniors, and seniors. It had four classes of members: active (student), faculty, honorary, and associate.

== Chapters ==
Pi Delta Epsilon chartered at least 174 chapters before its merger in 1975.

== Notable members ==
- Otis Bigelow (Hamilton College), Broadway actor, playwright, and stage manager
- Craven Crowell (Lipscomb University), former chairman of the Tennessee Valley Authority
- Fitzhugh Dodson (Johns Hopkins University), clinical psychologist, lecturer and educator
- Geary Eppley (University of Maryland), former University of Maryland athletic director
- John Robert Greene, historian and professor at Cazenovia College
- Curtis D. MacDougall (Ripon College), journalist, professor, and writer
- Alfred Prettyman, publisher
- Barbara Rosenthal, avant-garde artist, writer and performer
- William L. Shirer (Coe College), journalist, author, and war correspondent
- W. Harry Vaughan (Georgia Tech), professor of ceramic engineering at the Georgia School of Technology
- Earl Larkin Williams (Swarthmore College), astronomer and mathematician
