= Alpha Phi Gamma (honor society) =

American journalism honor society (1919–1975)

- ΑΦΓ
- Founded: December 11, 1919; 106 years ago Ohio Northern University
- Type: Honor
- Former affiliation: Independent
- Status: Merged
- Merge date: June 1, 1975
- Successor: Society for Collegiate Journalists
- Emphasis: Journalism
- Scope: National
- Colors: Black and White
- Flower: White carnation
- Publication: The Alpha Phi Gamma Reporter; Black and White
- Chapters: 111
- Headquarters: United States

Alpha Phi Gamma (ΑΦΓ) was an American honor society for journalism. It was founded in 1919 at Ohio Northern University in Ada, Ohio. It merged with Pi Delta Epsilon to form the Society for Collegiate Journalists in 1975.

== History ==
Alpha Phi Gamma was originally called Phi Alpha Gamma. Phi Alpha Gamma was founded on December 11, 1919, at Ohio Northern University in lda, Ohio. It was conceived by faculty member H.B. Focht to support the campus newspaper because there was no journalism class at the time. Its founders were Focht, Tom B. Haber, R.S. Lyman, Lloyd W. Reese, and Fred C. Slager. Lyman was its first president.

In 1923, the group held a convention to discuss forming a national organization. Delegates from six other Ohio colleges attended and were granted charters. At this meeting, the group changed its name to Alpha Phi Gamma because there was already a national fraternity called Phi Alpha Gamma. Also at this meeting, the society became coed with the initiation of Mildred Hullinger, its first female member.

Member Edward Steinberg created the ritual and key for Alpha Phi Gamma. Georgia Russell designed the society's certificate.

In early 1929, Alpha Phi Gamma began merger discussions with Omega Xi Alpha, a California journalism honor fraternity. The two officially merged with the opening of the fall 1929 semester. The merger was followed by changes to the Alpha Phi Gamma constitution and rituals. Omega Xi Alpha had seven chapters—six of which joined Alpha Phi Gamma as its western division. The newly formed eastern administrative division consisted of the states east of the Mississippi River. It absorbed Iota Tau, a local honorary at the College of Puget Sound in February 1931.

After the society's activity came to a standstill during World War II, Gil A. Cowan of the Los Angeles Examiner was responsible for its revival and post-war growth. In 1949, Cowan was named president emeritus. In the spring of 1957, Alpha Phi Gamma absorbed Alpha Delta, a journalistic recognition society.

On June 1, 1975, Alpha Phi Gamma merged with Pi Delta Epsilon to form the Society for Collegiate Journalists (SCJ).

=== Beta Phi Gamma ===
Beta Phi Gamma was established in December 1, 1933 at an Alpha Phi Gamma national conference in San Bernardino, California. It was created as a national coeducational fraternity and honor society for journalism at two-year colleges and was an affiliate of Alpha Phi Gamma. I

== Symbols ==
Alpha Phi Gamma's badge was designed by member Edward Steinberg. It was a rectangular key with the three Greek letters "ΑΦΓ" diagonally from upper left to lower right, three stars in the upper right, and an inkwell in the lower left. Its coat of arms included three wreaths, quill-surmounted inkwells, and a secretary bird at the crest. The pledge emblem was a white bridge emblem with Alpha Phi Gamma inscribed in black.

The society's colors were black and white. Its flower was the white carnation. Its publication was called Black and White.

== Officers ==
The presidents of Alpha Phi Gamma were:

- 1923–1926 – Charles McCorkhill, Ohio Northern University
- 1926–1927 – George McNamara, Ohio Northern University
- 1927–1928 – Ralph L. Ropp, Ohio Northern University
- 1928–1929 – Maxwell P. Boggs, Muskingum University
- 1929–1930 – Richard P. Overmyer, Ohio Northern University
- 1930–1933 – Russell H. Fitzgibbon, Hanover College
- 1933–1936 – John Allan Smith, University of California, Santa Barbara
- 1937–1939 – Richard P. Overmyer, Ohio Northern University
- 1940–1942 – Erwin W. Bischoll, San Francisco State University
- 1942–1943 – Lawrence J. Freeman, Ohio Northern University
- 1945–1947 – Gil A. Cowan, Southwestern College (Los Angeles)
- 1948 – Paul S. Conklin, Hanover College
- 1949 – Gilbert L. Brown, University of Redlands
- 1950–1951 – J. Paul Boushelle, New Mexico State University
- 1952 – Ira G. Hawk, Wilmington College (Ohio)
- 1953–1954 – Paul V. Sheehan, Fresno State University
- 1954–1955 – Lloyd Ritter, Occidental College
- 1955–1956 – Clyde Parker, Sacramento State University
- 1956–1957 – Louis E. Ingelhart, Ball State University
- 1957–1958 – John H. Duke, Fresno State University
- 1958–1959 – Frank S. Basker, Hanover College
- 1959–1960 – Wilfred P. James, California State University at Long Beach
- 1960–1961 – John A. Boyd, Indiana State University
- 1961–1962 – Leo V. Young, San Francisco State University
- 1962–1964 – J. William Click, Central Michigan University
- 1964–1965 – Erling H. Erlandson, California State University at Northridge
- 1965–1967 – Arthur H. Margosian, Fresno State University
- 1967–1969 – Ira L. Baker, High Point College
- 1969–1971 – Marilyn A. Walker, Taylor University
- 1971–1975 – Glen A. W. Kleine, Eastern Kentucky University

== National conventions ==
Following is a list of the National Conventions for Alpha Phi Gamma. Alpha Phi Gamma stopped having National Conventions after 1954.

- 1923 – Ohio Northern University, Ada, Ohio
- 1924 – University of Akron, Akron, Ohio
- 1926 – Ohio Northern University, Ada, Ohio
- 1927 – Ohio Northern University, Ada, Ohio
- 1928 – University of Akron, Ohio, Ohio
- 1929 – Hanover College, Hanover, Indiana
- 1930 – Albion College, Albion, Michigan
- 1933 – University of California at Santa Barbara, Santa Barbara, California
- 1946 – Indiana State University, Terre Haute, Indiana
- 1948 – University of Redlands, Redlands, California
- 1949 – Moorhead State University, Moorhead, Minnesota
- 1954 – Fresno State University, Fresno, California

== Notable members ==
- Ralph L. Ropp, 11th president of Louisiana Tech University
