= F. Jay Taylor =

American academic administrator, historian and writer

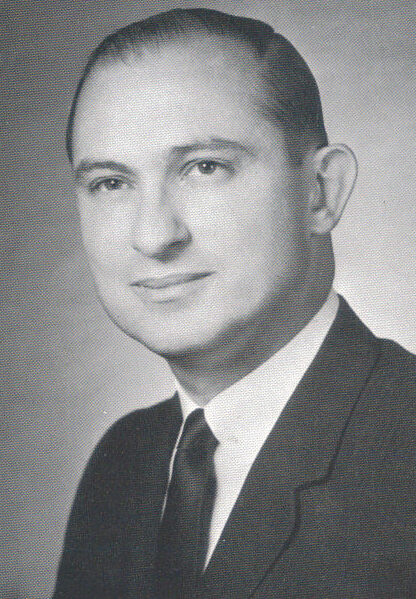
- Taylor in 1970

12th President of Louisiana Tech University
- In office 1962–1987
- Preceded by: Ralph L. Ropp
- Succeeded by: Dan Reneau

Personal details
- Born: Foster Jay Taylor; September 9, 1923 Gibsland, Louisiana, U.S.
- Died: May 15, 2011 (aged 87) Ruston, Louisiana, U.S.
- Spouse: Lou Taylor
- Education: University of California, Santa Barbara; Claremont Graduate University; Tulane University
- Occupation: Academic administrator, historian, writer

Foster Jay Taylor (August 9, 1923 – May 15, 2011) was an American academic administrator, historian and writer. He served as president of Louisiana Tech University, a public research university in Ruston, Louisiana, from 1962 to 1987.

== Life and career ==
Taylor was born in Gibsland, Louisiana. He attended Gibsland High School, graduating in 1940. After graduating, he briefly attended Louisiana Tech University, before enlisting as an aviation cadet in the United States Navy during World War II, which after his honorable discharge, he earned his bachelor's degree in social science at the University of California, Santa Barbara in 1948. He also earned his master's degree in history at the Claremont Graduate University in 1949, and earned his PhD degree in history and government at Tulane University in 1952.

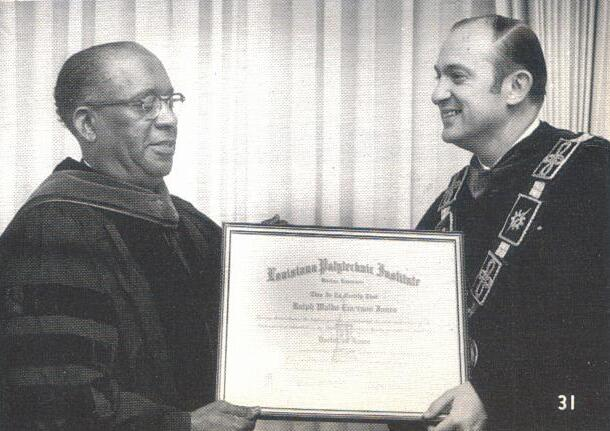
Taylor (right) giving an honorary LL.D. to Grambling State University president Ralph Waldo Emerson Jones, 1970

Taylor served as dean of Louisiana College, a private Baptist university in Pineville, Louisiana, from 1952 to 1962. During his years as dean, in 1956, he wrote the book The United States and the Spanish Civil War 1936–39. and in 1957, he was elected as president of the Central Louisiana Historical Society. After his service as dean, he served as president of the Louisiana Tech University, a public research university in Ruston, Louisiana, from 1962 to 1987.

== Death ==
Taylor died in Ruston, Louisiana on May 15, 2011, at the age of 87.
