= Ralph Waldo Emerson Jones =

American college president and baseball coach

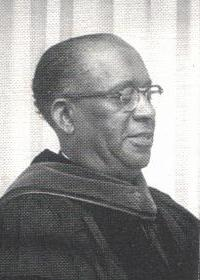
- Jones in 1970
- Born: August 6, 1905; Lake Charles, Louisiana, U.S.
- Died: April 9, 1982 (aged 76); Ruston, Louisiana, U.S.
- Education: Southern University; Columbia University
- Occupations: President and baseball coach, Grambling State University
- Coaching career

Coaching career (HC unless noted)
- 1936–1977: Grambling State Tigers

Head coaching record
- Overall: 816–218

Accomplishments and honors

Championships
- 6 Midwest Athletic League; 5 SWAC

Awards
- NAIA Coach of the Year Award (1967)
- College Baseball Hall of Fame; Inducted in 2011

Ralph Waldo Emerson Jones Sr. (August 6, 1905 – April 9, 1982), known as Prez Jones, was an American educator and administrator. He served as the second president of Grambling State University, a historically black university in Grambling, Louisiana, from 1936 until 1977. He also coached the Grambling State Tigers baseball team, and was inducted into the National College Baseball Hall of Fame.

== Early life and education ==
Jones was born in Lake Charles, Louisiana, on August 6, 1905. His grandfather was a slave and his father, John S. Jones, was the first dean of Southern University, a historically black university in Baton Rouge, Louisiana. His mother owned all of the works of Ralph Waldo Emerson, and named her son after the author.

Jones earned his bachelor's degree from Southern University in 1925. He also earned a master's degree from Columbia University in mathematics.

== Grambling State University ==
Charles P. Adams, the president of Grambling State University (GSU), interviewed all five members of the Southern University's 1925 graduating class and decided to hire one of Jones' classmates. However, he mixed up their names and hired Jones. Though Adams recognized his mistake after his arrival, Jones stayed and was assigned to teach chemistry, math, and biology. He formed the Grambling State Tigers baseball team and served as its head coach. He also formed the Grambling State Tigers football team and served as its first coach. Jones assumed the duties of the registrar and dean of men, and formed the GSU Tiger Marching Band. Jones also wrote Grambling State's alma mater.

Jones became president of Grambling State, then known as the Louisiana Negro Normal and Industrial Institute, in 1936. He gave up all of his duties at Grambling, except he remained the coach of the baseball team. The school had joined the University of Louisiana System in 1926, but did not receive financial support until 1932, and Jones continued to advocate for more money for the school. It transitioned into a four-year college in 1944, and Jones convinced the Louisiana State Legislature to change the name to Grambling State College. He hired Eddie Robinson to become the football coach. In 1970, the Louisiana Board of Education waived the mandatory retirement requirement at age 65 for Jones. Grambling State achieved university status in 1974. Jones retired as president in 1977. While he was president, the schools' faculty increased from 17 to 500 and the student body increased from 120 to 4,000.

As the baseball coach, Jones had a 816–218 (.789) win–loss record. He led the Tigers to six Midwest Athletic League championships between 1952 and 1958 and to five championships in the Southwestern Athletic Conference (SWAC) between 1961 and 1967. In 1967, Jones won the National Association of Intercollegiate Athletics Coach of the Year Award. Players that he coached who reached Major League Baseball included Ralph Garr, Tommie Agee, Cleon Jones, and Johnny Jeter.

== Personal life and honors ==
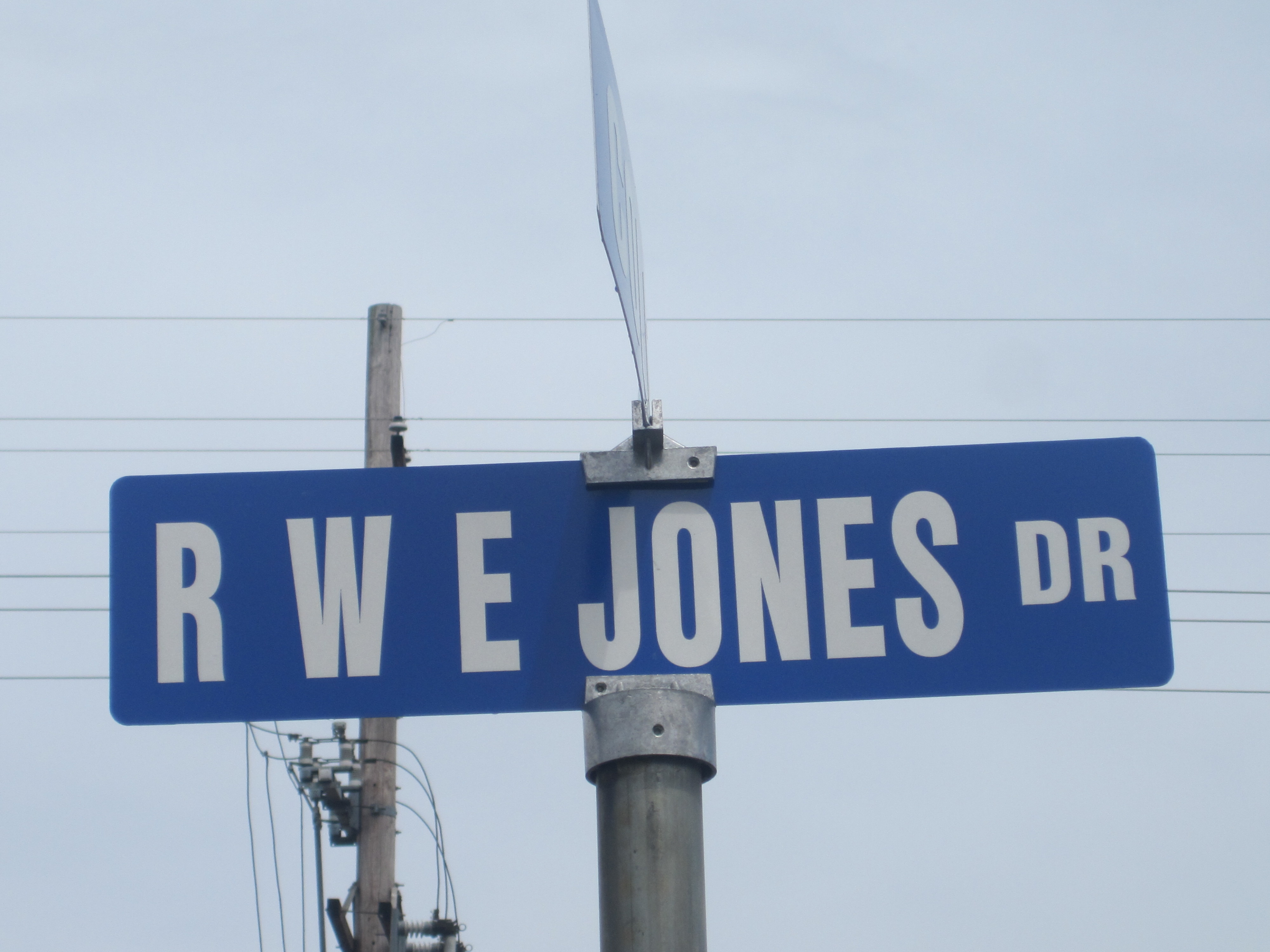
R.W.E. Jones Drive in Grambling, Louisiana

Jones was married and had two sons, Ralph Jr. and John Arthur. His wife, Mildred Shay Jones, died in 1953. Jones died at Lincoln General Hospital in Ruston, Louisiana, on April 9, 1982, due to complications from gallstone surgery. Over 2,000 attended his memorial service at Grambling State, including Louisiana politicians Joe Waggonner, Alphonse Jackson, and Charles C. Barham.

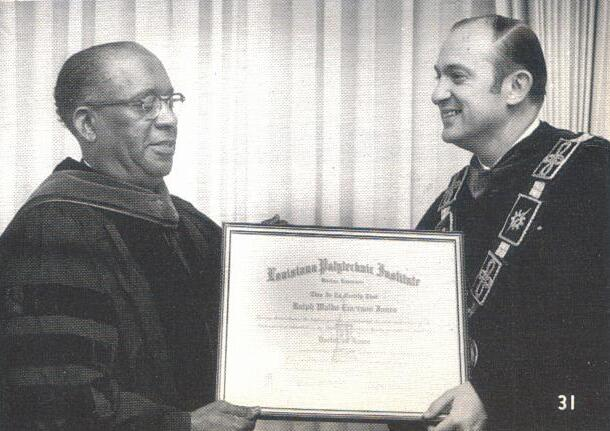
Jones (left) receiving an honorary LL.D. from Louisiana Tech University president F. Jay Taylor, 1970

Jones received two honorary degrees: a Doctor of Laws from Louisiana Tech University in 1970 and a Doctor of Humane Letters from the University of Baltimore in 1977. He was inducted into the SWAC Hall of Fame in 1992 and the National College Baseball Hall of Fame in 2011. Grambling State inducted Jones into its Hall of Fame in the inaugural class in 2009 and renamed its baseball field after Jones and Wilbert Ellis in 2011.

== See also ==
- List of longest serving higher education presidents in the United States
