= Dan Reneau =

American university president

Daniel Reneau

President of Louisiana Tech University
- In office July 1, 1987 – June 30, 2013
- Preceded by: F. Jay Taylor
- Succeeded by: Les Guice

Interim President of the University of Louisiana System
- Incumbent
- Assumed office December 2015
- Preceded by: Sandra Woodley

Personal details
- Born: Daniel Dugan Reneau Jr. June 11, 1940 (age 86) Woodville, Mississippi, US
- Education: Louisiana Tech University (BA 1963, MA 1964); Clemson University (Ph.D., 1966)
- Profession: Academic

Daniel Dugan Reneau Jr. (born June 11, 1940) is the former president of Louisiana Tech University in Ruston, Louisiana, a position which he filled from July 1, 1987, until his retirement effective June 30, 2013. He was succeeded by Dr. Les Guice.

== Early life ==
Reneau was born on June 11, 1940, in Woodville, Mississippi. He grew up on a farm and worked in a cannery after high school.

He graduated from Louisiana Tech University in 1963 with a bachelor's degree in chemical engineering, followed by a master's degree in chemical engineering in 1964. While at Louisiana Tech, he joined Tau Beta Pi in 1963. He received his Ph.D. in 1966 from Clemson University.

== Career ==
Reneau returned to Louisiana Tech in 1967 to serve as an assistant professor of chemical engineering. He became an associate professor in 1969. In 1972, Reneau established and became the head of the Louisiana Tech biomedical engineering department, only the fifth undergraduate program of its kind. He was promoted to full professor in 1973.

Reneau's research interests focused on the application of engineering principles to living systems, the understanding of cerebral palsy, and the use of technology to help people with disabilities. He has published more than seventy technical papers in books and journals and edited five books. He founded the national biomedical engineering honor society Alpha Eta Mu Beta in 1979. In 1980, Reneau was promoted to vice president of academic affairs at Louisiana Tech.

On February 20, 1987, Reneau was selected to succeed the retiring Taylor as the 13th president of the institution and assumed the office on July 1 of that year. He oversaw at $50 million fundraising campaign. Reneau navigated the university through state-mandated cutbacks. In 2012 Reneau noted, "Louisiana Tech is now a state-assisted university rather than a state-supported university, and that is sad. Not only have we had to do away with programs like the school's dairy and beef herds, but we've had to shift the load to the students in the form of higher fees and tuition".

In 1995, he was awarded the Distinguished Arthur T. Prescott Professorship in Engineering. Reneau retired on June 30, 2013, after working at Louisiana Tech for 46 years. He is the longest-tenured president in Louisiana Tech's history. In December 2015, Reneau was appointed interim president of the University of Louisiana System, succeeding Sandra Woodley.

== Honors ==
- Fellow of the Rehabilitation Engineering and Assistive Technology Society of North America (1989)
- Alumni Fellow at Clemson University (1999)
- Fellow of the American Institute for Medical and Biological Engineering (2001)
- Newel Perry Award from the National Federation of the Blind (2002)
- Tau Beta Pi Distinguished Alumnus (2003)
- Louisiana Tech University Athletics Hall of Fame (2015)
- Louisiana Tech named the Daniel D. Reneau Biomedical Engineering Building in his honor (2022)

== Personal life ==
Reneau married Linda Digby, a native of Bernice in Union Parish on June 3, 1963. The couple has a weekend retreat there with a main house and two cabins. They have two children, Dana Reneau Bernhard and John Reneau.

| Preceded by F. Jay Taylor | President of Louisiana Tech University; 1987–2013 | Succeeded by Leslie K. Guice |
| Preceded by Sandra Woodley | President of the University of Louisiana System; 2015– | Succeeded by Interim incumbent |
