= Society for Collegiate Journalists =

American honor society for journalists

- SCJ
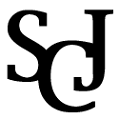
- Founded: June 1, 1975; 51 years ago United States
- Type: Honor
- Affiliation: Independent
- Status: Active
- Emphasis: Collegiate Journalism
- Scope: National
- Colors: Black and White
- Publication: The Reporter
- Chapters: 100+ (active)
- Members: 1,200 active
- Predecessors: Pi Delta Epsilon and Alpha Phi Gamma
- Headquarters: 610 West Fourth Street; Buena Vista University; Storm Lake, Iowa 50588; United States
- Website: scjnational.org

The Society for Collegiate Journalists (SCJ) is an American honor society for student journalists. It was created in 1975 through the merger of Pi Delta Epsilon and Alpha Phi Gamma.

== History ==
The Society for Collegiate Journalists was formed on June 1, 1975, as a merger between the two journalism honor societies, Pi Delta Epsilon and Alpha Phi Gamma. Pi Delta Epsilon was established in 1909. Alpha Phi Gamma was established in 1919. It held its first national meeting at the David Lipscomb College in Nashville, Tennessee in 1977.

The society expanded across the United States and includes around 100 chapters. As of 2024, SCJ has approximately 1,200 members. Its national headquarters in location in Storm Lake, Iowa.

== Symbols ==
The seal of the Society of Collegiate Journalists incorporated elements of its predecessors. It is a circle surrounded by the words “SOCIETY OF COLLEGIATE JOURNALISTS FOUNDED A.D. 1909" Inside the circle is an inkwell with crossed quills above.

The society's colors are black and white, symbolizing journalism's heritage of print media. It uses maroon and silver for banners and its Medal of Merit. Graduating members may wear honor cords which are red.

Its publication is called The Reporter.

== Activities ==
At the national level, the SCJ runs a biennial national convention and an annual student journalist contest with judges who are professionals in the field. It also publishes an online journal, The Collegiate Journalist, and a newsletter, The Reporter.

SCJ presents the Medal of Merit Certificate, the Presidential Citation, the Ingelhart First Amendment Award, the McDonald Award for the outstanding chapter, the SCJ Barlow Student Journalist of the Year Award, the Outstanding New Advisor Award, and the Outstanding New Chapter Award. The Student Journalist of the Year Award winner receives a scholarship and Ingelhart Award receives a cash prize.

At the local level, chapters host workshops, speakers, and seminars related to journalism.

== Chapters ==
SCJ has around 100 active chapters in the United States. Its chapters use their original charter date, from the predecessor organizations. Inactive institutions are in italics.

Institution	Charter date and range	Location	Status	Ref.
Ohio Northern University	1919	Ada, Ohio		
Stevens Institute of Technology	1922	Hoboken, New Jersey		
Muskingum College	1923	New Concord, Ohio		
Washington & Jefferson College	1924	Washington, Pennsylvania		
University of Richmond	1926	Richmond, Virginia		
Virginia Tech	1930	Blacksburg, Virginia	Active	
Catholic University of America	1931	Washington, D.C.		
Westminster College	1934	New Wilmington, Pennsylvania		
College of William & Mary	1935	Williamsburg, Virginia		
Hastings College	1937	Hastings, Nebraska	Active	
Franklin College	1938	Franklin, Indiana	Active	
Hampden-Sydney College	1939–xxxx ?; 2000	Hampden Sydney, Virginia	Active	
Southern Illinois University Carbondale	1939	Carbondale, Illinois	Inactive	
Midland Lutheran College	1940	Fremont, Nebraska	Inactive	
Bethany College	1947	Bethany, West Virginia	Active	
John Carroll University	1948	University Heights, Ohio	Active	
Clarkson University	1949	Potsdam, New York		
Eastern Illinois University	1949	Charleston, Illinois	Active	
Fairmont State College	1949	Fairmont, West Virginia	Inactive	
Marietta College	1949	Marietta, Ohio	Active	
Wartburg College	1949	Waverly, Iowa	Active	
Keuka College	1950	Keuka Park, New York		
New Jersey Institute of Technology	1951	Newark, New Jersey		
Hofstra University	1953–xxxx ?; May 2014	Hempstead, New York	Active	(Note: This chapter is a subsection of the Long Island Press Club.)
Thiel College	1953	Greenville, Pennsylvania	Active	
Bridgewater College	1955	Bridgewater, Virginia	Inactive	
Caldwell College	1960	Caldwell, New Jersey		
Pittsburg State University	1960	Pittsburg, Kansas		
Bethel College	1961	McKenzie, Tennessee	Inactive	
Valparaiso University	1961	Valparaiso, Indiana	Active	
Winona State University	1961	Winona, Minnesota	Active	
Anderson University	1963	Anderson, Indiana		
Bemidji State University	1964	Bemidji, Minnesota		
Clarion University of Pennsylvania	1964	Clarion, Pennsylvania	Inactive	
Lipscomb University	1964	Nashville, Tennessee	Active	
Radford University	1964–after 2011	Radford, Virginia	Inactive	
Millersville University of Pennsylvania	1965	Millersville, Pennsylvania	Inactive	
Northeastern State University	1965	Tahlequah, Oklahoma		
Southeast Missouri State University	1965	Cape Girardeau, Missouri	Active	
Saint John’s University	1965	New York City, New York	Active	
Bloomsburg University of Pennsylvania	1966	Bloomsburg, Pennsylvania		
High Point University	1966	High Point, North Carolina	Active	
Evangel University	1967	Springfield, Missouri	Active	
Harding University	1967	Searcy, Arkansas	Active	(Note: The national website says this chapter is in Arizona.)
Mount St. Mary's College	1967	Emmitsburg, Maryland	Inactive	
Slippery Rock University	1967	Slippery Rock, Pennsylvania	Active	
Eastern Kentucky University	1968	Richmond, Kentucky	Active	
Lock Haven University of Pennsylvania	1968	Lock Haven, Pennsylvania		
Fort Hays State University	1970	Hays, Kansas	Active	
West Virginia Wesleyan College	1970	Buckhannon, West Virginia		
Oklahoma Baptist University	1971	Shawnee, Oklahoma	Inactive	
Winthrop University	1972	Rock Hill, South Carolina	Active	
Tennessee Tech	1975	Cookeville, Tennessee	Active	
University of North Alabama	1978	Florence, Alabama		
Cabrini University	1979	Radnor Township, Pennsylvania	Active	
Embry–Riddle Aeronautical University, Daytona Beach	1979	Daytona Beach, Florida		
James Madison University	1979	Harrisonburg, Virginia	Inactive	
Mary Baldwin University	1979	Staunton, Virginia	Active	
Marycrest College	1981	Davenport, Iowa	Inactive	(Note: The college became Teikyo Marycrest University and finally Marycrest International University. It closed in 2002 because of financial shortcomings.)
Southern Arkansas University	1981	Magnolia, Arkansas	Inactive	
Wingate College	1981	Wingate, North Carolina		(Note: The national website says this college is in North Dakota.)
College of St. Francis	1982	Joliet, Illinois		
Manchester Community College	1982	Manchester, Connecticut		
Carson-Newman College	1983	Jefferson City, Tennessee	Inactive	
Cowley Community College	1983	Arkansas City, Kansas		
Kansas State University	1983	Manhattan, Kansas	Inactive	
Kingsborough Community College	1983	Brooklyn, New York		
Milwaukee Area Technical College	1983	Milwaukee, Wisconsin		
Ocean County College	1983	Ocean County, New Jersey		
Southeastern Louisiana University	1983	Hammond, Louisiana	Active	
University of Scranton	1983	Scranton, Pennsylvania	Inactive	
Drury College	1984	Springfield, Missouri	Inactive	
Elizabethtown College	1984	Elizabethtown, Pennsylvania	Active	
Garden City Community College	1984	Garden City, Kansas	Inactive	
Wabash College	1984	Crawfordsville, Indiana	Inactive	
Jacksonville University	1985	Jacksonville, Florida	Inactive	
Jacksonville State University	1985	Jacksonville, Alabama	Inactive	
Nicholls State University	1985	Thibodaux, Louisiana	Inactive	
Oakton Community College	1985	Des Plaines, Illinois	Inactive	
Appalachian State University	1986	Boone, North Carolina	Inactive	
Minot State College	1986	Minot, North Dakota	Inactive	
Christian Brothers College	1987	Memphis, Tennessee	Inactive	
Hunter College	1987	New York City, New York	Inactive	
Independence Community College	1987	Independence, Kansas		
Ouachita Baptist University	1987	Arkadelphia, Arkansas	Inactive	
Randolph–Macon College	1987	Ashland, Virginia		
University of Louisiana at Lafayette	1987	Lafayette, Louisiana	Inactive	
Wayne State College	1987	Wayne, Nebraska	Inactive	
Carnegie Mellon University	1988	Pittsburgh, Pennsylvania		
Embry–Riddle Aeronautical University, Prescott	1988	Prescott, Arizona	Inactive	
Labette Community College	1988	Parsons, Kansas		
Lynchburg College	1988	Lynchburg, Virginia	Inactive	
Lincoln Memorial University	1989	Harrogate, Tennessee		
North Central College	1989	Naperville, Illinois	Inactive	
University of Arkansas	1989	Fayetteville, Arkansas	Inactive	
Old Dominion University	1990	Norfolk, Virginia	Inactive	
Spring Arbor College	1990	Spring Arbor, Michigan	Inactive	
Eastern Michigan University	1991	Ypsilanti, Michigan	Active	
Berry College	1992	Mount Berry, Georgia	Inactive	
Regent University	1993	Virginia Beach, Virginia	Inactive	
Susquehanna University	1993	Selinsgrove, Pennsylvania	Inactive	
University of Pittsburgh at Johnstown	1994	Johnstown, Pennsylvania	Inactive	
Marian College	1995	Fond du Lac, Wisconsin	Inactive	
Union University	1995	Jackson, Tennessee	Inactive	
Virginia Wesleyan University	1995	Virginia Beach, Virginia	Active	
McDaniel College	1996	Westminster, Maryland	Active	
New York Institute of Technology	1996	Old Westbury, New York	Inactive	
North Carolina State University	1996	Raleigh, North Carolina	Active	
Clarke College	1997	Dubuque, Iowa	Inactive	
Murray State University	1997	Murray, Kentucky	Inactive	
Oxnard College	1997	Oxnard, California	Inactive	
Taylor University	1997	Upland, Indiana	Inactive	
University of Nebraska at Kearney	1997	Kearney, Nebraska	Active	
Wilkes University	1998	Wilkes-Barre, Pennsylvania		
Youngstown State University	1998	Youngstown, Ohio		
Simpson College	1999	Indianola, Iowa		
Southwest Missouri State University	1999	Springfield, Missouri	Inactive	
State University of New York at New Paltz	1999	New Paltz, New York	Inactive	
University of Pittsburgh at Bradford	1999	Bradford, Pennsylvania	Inactive	
Utica University	1999	Utica, New York	Active	
Washburn University	1999	Topeka, Kansas		
Westark Community College	1999	Fort Smith, Arkansas	Inactive	
Asbury College	2000	Wilmore, Kentucky	Inactive	
Northeast Texas Community College	2000	Mount Pleasant, Texas	Active	
Widener University	2000	Chester, Pennsylvania	Inactive	
University of the Pacific	2001	Stockton, California		
Naugatuck Valley Community College	2002	Waterbury, Connecticut	Active	
Valdosta State University	2002	Valdosta, Georgia	Active	
Neumann College	2003	Aston, Pennsylvania	Inactive	
Piedmont University	2003	Demorest, Georgia	Active	
Shenandoah College	2003	Winchester, Virginia	Inactive	
Community College of Baltimore County	2004	Essex, Maryland	Inactive	
Barton College	2005	Wilson, North Carolina	Active	
Bennett College	2005	Greensboro, North Carolina		
Loyola Marymount University	2006	Los Angeles, California	Inactive	
Providence College	2006	Providence, Rhode Island		
Savannah College of Art and Design	2006	Savannah, Georgia		
Keene State College	2007	Keene, New Hampshire	Active	
Lindsey Wilson College	2007	Columbia, Kentucky	Inactive	
Mercer University	2007	Macon, Georgia	Inactive	
Robert Morris University	2009	Moon Township, Pennsylvania	Active	
Landmark College	2010	Putney, Vermont	Inactive	
Frostburg State University	2011	Frostburg, Maryland	Active	
Lee University	2011	Cleveland, Tennessee	Active	
Marywood University	2011	Scranton, Pennsylvania	Active	
Savannah College of Art and Design	2011	Atlanta, Georgia	Active	
Buena Vista University	2012	Storm Lake, Iowa	Active	
Savannah State University	2018	Savannah, Georgia	Inactive	
Fort Lewis College		Durango, Colorado		
Virginia State University		Ettrick, Virginia	Inactive	
Western Kentucky University		Bowling Green, Kentucky	Active	
Community College of Denver		Denver, Colorado	Active	(Note: Known as the Auraria chapter.)

== See also ==
- National Pacemaker Awards
- Honor cords
