= Fiction Writers Review =

Online literary journal, founded in 2008

Fiction Writers Review is an online literary journal that publishes reviews of new fiction, interviews with fiction writers, and essays on craft and the writing life. The journal was founded in 2008 and incorporated as a non-profit organization in Michigan in 2011. In 2012 it received 501(c)(3) tax-exempt status.

In addition to publishing a literary journal, Fiction Writers Review also hosts an annual literary symposium in Ann Arbor, Michigan, entitled "The State of the Book: A Celebration of Michigan Writers and Writing." The 2012 inaugural event was funded in part by a Major Grant from the Michigan Humanities Council, as well as support from the University of Michigan's Department of English Language & Literature, the Zell Visiting Writing Series, and The Institute for Humanities. Event partners include fellow literary non-profit organizations 826michigan, Dzanc Books, InsideOut Literary Arts, The National Writers Series, and The Neutral Zone. Programming highlights include the release of the 2012 Best American Nonrequired Reading anthology by author and publisher Dave Eggers, a keynote conversation between National Book Award nominee Charles Baxter and Pulitzer Prize–winning poet Philip Levine, and a lecture by poet and activist Carolyn Forche. Participating authors have included Ellen Airgood, Natalie Bakopoulos, Matt Bell, Terry Blackhawk, Benjamin Busch, Jonathan Cohen, Bonnie Jo Campbell, Jerry Dennis, Ariel Djanikian, Bill Harris, Francine Harris, Donovan Hohn, Jay Baron Nicorvo, Thisbe Nissen, Michael Paterniti, Eileen Pollack, Doug Stanton, and Keith Taylor.

Fiction Writers Review also organizes and sponsors an annual write-a-thon, "The Great Write Off," whose goal is to raise both public awareness of and funding for the charitable work of these organizations.

Notable publications include Charles Baxter's essay "Owl Criticism," which was originally presented as part of the 2011 AWP Writers Conference Panel "The Good Review: Criticism in the Age of Book Blogs and Amazon.com" and has been subsequently cited in such publications as American Fiction Notes and elsewhere; Christine Hartzler's essay "Games Are Not About Monsters," which was anthologized in Best of the Web 2010 and collected in Creative Composition, edited by Pollack, Chamberlin, and Bakopoulos; and Michael Rudin's "Writing the Great American Novel Video Game," which was also collected in Creative Composition.

Editors: Jeremiah Chamberlin, Michael Rudin, Rebecca Scherm, Brandon Bye, Leah Falk, Steven Wingate, James Pinto

Interview subjects have included: Megan Abbott, Steve Almond, Russell Banks, Richard Bausch, Matt Bell, Pinckney Benedict, Tom Bissell, Robert Olen Butler, Lydia Davis, Richard Ford, Ben Fountain, Cristina Garcia, Skip Horack, Laura Kasischke, J. Robert Lennon, Jonathan Lethem, Margot Livesey, Bruce Machart, Hisham Mater, Elizabeth McCracken, Ana Menendez, Peter Orner, Daniel Orozco, Benjamin Percy, Steven Schwartz, Jim Shepard, Manil Suri, Wells Tower, Laura van den Berg, Colson Whitehead, Charles Yu, and many others.

== Recognition ==
- Michigan Humanities Council: 2012 Major Grant recipient
- "Writing the Great American Video Game" by Michael Rudin collected in Creative Composition, edited by Eileen Pollack, Jeremiah Chamberlin, and Natalie Bakopoulos (Cengage, 2013)
- Featured Presenter at the 2010 AWP Writers' Conference on the panel "Evolution of the New Media: Online Literary Journals in 2010"
- Panel Organizer and Featured Presenter at the 2011 AWP Writers' Conference on the panel "The Good Review: Criticism in the Age of Book Blogs and Amazon.com"
