= Rooftops of Tehran =

Rooftops of Tehran may refer to one of the following books:

- Rooftops of Tehran (poetry collection), a 2008 poetry collection by Sholeh Wolpe
- Rooftops of Tehran (novel), a 2009 novel by Mahbod Seraji
