= Gab Reisman =

American playwright

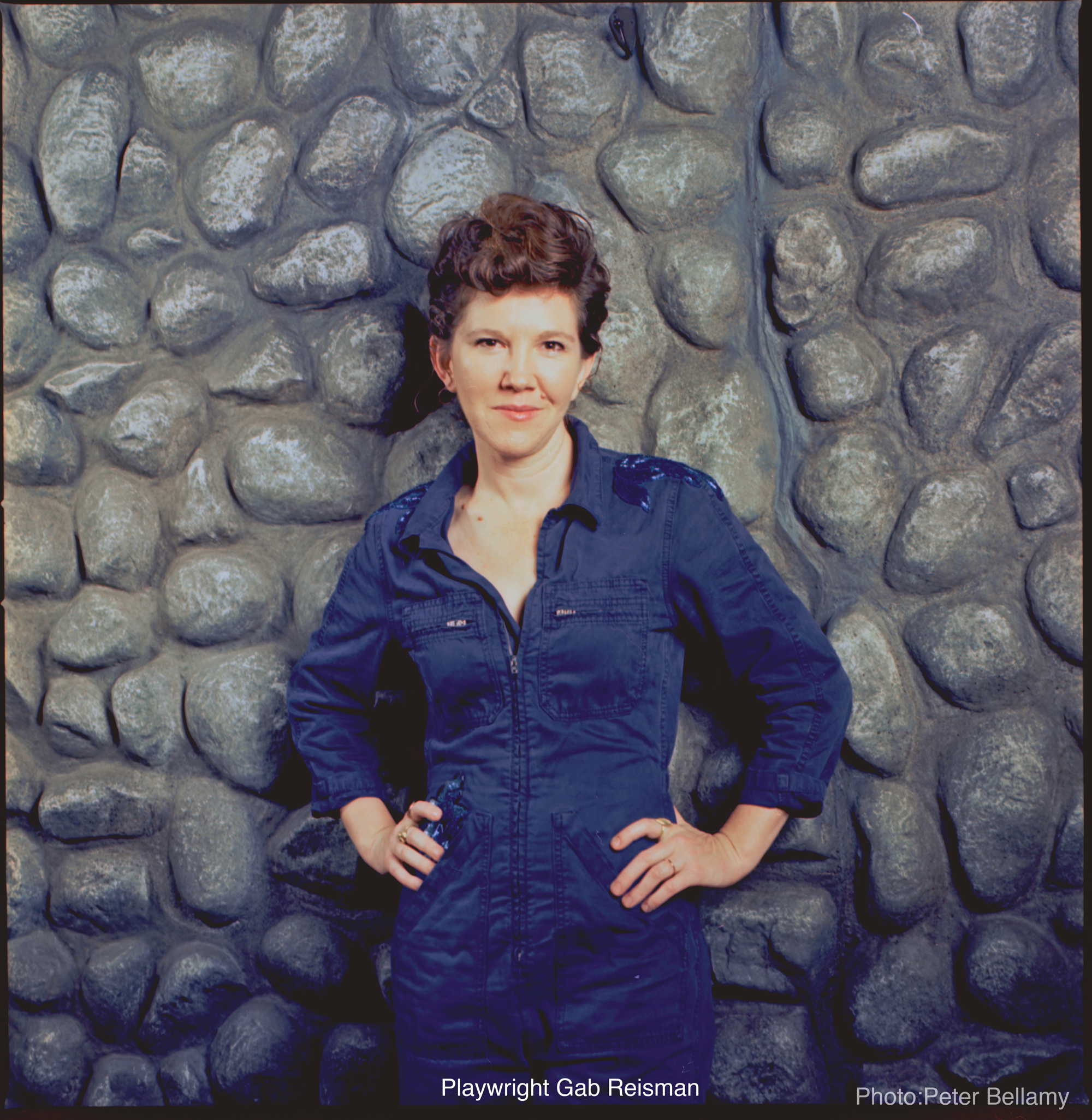
- Reisman on the set of Clubbed Thumb's Spindle Shuttle Needle, 2022
- Occupation: Playwright
- Writing career
- Period: 2001–present
- Website: gabreisman.com

Gab Reisman (also credited as Gabrielle Reisman) is an American playwright, director, and immersive theatre maker. Her plays examine issues of cultural geography and identity, often incorporating humor and elements of the surreal.

Reisman sometimes sets her work in historic moments of crisis, such as the 1889 Johnstown Flood or the Napoleonic Wars, as comment on contemporary politics and zeitgeist. She has written about issues of climate change in South Louisiana, public education reform, and New Orleans bounce music. Besides her solo-authored plays, Reisman has collaborated with playwrights Katie Bender and Abe Koogler to make immersive theater experiences in Austin and New York City.

== Early life and education ==
Reisman was born in Urbana, Illinois, the daughter of poet lawyer Carl Reisman and massage therapist Jean McManus. She produced her earliest plays at The Station Theatre. After high school she founded Mongoose Productions, a theatre and short film company and produced work in Germany and Chicago.

Reisman moved to New Orleans in 2005, three weeks before Hurricane Katrina. She completed a BA at The University of New Orleans and founded The Alamo Underground, a raw performance venue in the garage below her apartment. Reisman completed an MFA (Playwriting) at The UT Austin.

== Career ==
Reisman produced her first play, Hook-Ups, in 2001 at the White Streets Arts Center while a high school student. Her subsequent plays Afternight Seating and Brian and Shevat premiered at The Station Theatre with later productions in Chicago, New York City, and New Orleans. These three early plays were published in the anthology More Pepper by Hot Lead Press.

From 2005 to 2010, Reisman was based full-time in New Orleans, where she built and opened The Alamo Underground, a community performance space, and worked as a teaching artist in the city's public schools. She produced a series of new play festivals and wrote Taste, a commission for The NOLA Project, in which actors cook a meal through the course of the play to share with the audience after the show.

Reisman and three other playwrights and designers in the UT Austin graduate program formed the immersive performance company Underbelly. Their first show, Slip River, led audiences through the anti-spaces of a traditional theatre, beginning as a lesson on Mark Twain-era orphan literary tropes and ending in a participatory dance party on the theatre's mainstage. Underbelly's next play, Church of the Passionate Cat was a film-noir inspired detective story co-produced with The Rude Mechs. Both shows incorporated the company's trademark elements of food, dance, and surprises of space. In 2015, Underbelly was commissioned by ZACH Theatre to build an immersive Alice in Wonderland that would play across the theatre's large outdoor campus. Underbelly's punk-rock inspired Alice moved multiple groups of audiences through nine performance spaces simultaneously.

Reisman relocated to New York City in 2013 where she founded Brooklyn Yard, an arts-incubator dedicated to producing workshop productions of new plays in venues around the borough. In 2015, the company produced Storm Still, a three-woman adaptation of King Lear. Storm Still received subsequent productions across the country, including at Vortex Repertory and The University of Utah.

In reflecting on Hurricane Katrina recovery a decade on, Reisman wrote Flood City, about survivors rebuilding after the 1889 Johnstown Flood. Flood City jumps in time between the days after the 19th century flood and the 1992 closure of the Bethlehem Steel Mill in Johnstown, tracing the human costs of the two disasters a century apart. The play premiered with The NOLA Project three weeks after the 2016 Louisiana floods with a subsequent production at Theater Alliance in Washington, D.C.

In 2017, Reisman began working on Next Year People, a devised performance with collaborators Katie Bender and Rachel Mars about utopias, artistic friendship, and competition. Next Year People premiered at the 2019 Fusebox Festival. She also began work on Jeune Terre, a dual commission from Ensemble Studio Theatre's Sloan Project and Barnard College about a small town in South Louisiana that is in danger of being subsumed by the Gulf of Mexico. Jeune Terre was inspired by Reisman's partner's work in coastal restoration. The piece began as a play with songs with composer Avi Amon and director Alice Reagan. Reisman and Amon have since begun to adapt the play into a musical.

Actors Theatre of Louisville commissioned Reisman to write Are You There? with playwrights Vivian Barnes and Jonathan Norton for the 44th Humana Festival. The play ran for one performance before being shuttered due to the COVID-19 pandemic. Clubbed Thumb commissioned Reisman to write Spindle Shuttle Needle in 2018, a play inspired by the work of Caryl Churchill and set in the uncertainty and danger of the Napoleonic Wars. Spindle Shuttle Needle premiered in 2022 as part of Clubbed Thumb's Summerworks. In the early days of the pandemic, Reisman wrote a darkly comic adaptation of Anton Chekov's The Seagull for The NOLA Project. Set in contemporary Mandeville, Louisiana, The Seagull or How to Eat It premiered at The New Orleans Museum of Art in 2022.

== Personal life ==
Reisman identifies as Jewish and queer. She is married to coastal disturbance ecologist Giovanna McClenachan. Her younger brother is singer-songwriter Morgan Orion. Reisman has written and directed several of Orion's music videos.

== Works ==
=== Produced plays ===
- The Seagull or How to Eat It (NOLA Project, 2022)
- Spindle Shuttle Needle (Clubbed Thumb, 2022)
- Are You There? (Actors Theatre or Louisville, 2020)
- Next Year People (Fusebox Festival, 2019)
- Jeune Terre (Barnard College, 2017)
- Flood City (NOLA Project, 2016, Theater Alliance 2018)
- Alice in Wonderland (ZACH Theatre, 2016, New Victory Labworks, 2016)
- Storm Still (Brooklyn Yard, 2015, Tulane 2016, Vortex Repertory, 2017, Drama League, 2018, University of Utah, 2021)
- Church of the Passionate Cat (Rude Mechs, 2014, Orchard Project Presents, 2015)
- Slip River (Cohen New Works Festival, 2013)
- Catch the Wall (NOLA Project, 2013)
- 70 Secrets of Marmalade Kittens (University of Texas at Austin, 2013)
- Stockpile (Cohen New Works Festival, 2011)
- Taste (NOLA Project, 2009, 2010)
- Brian and Shevat (Station Theatre, 2003, Side Project, 2005, Alamo Underground, 2008)
- Afternight Seating (Station Theatre, 2002, Toy Box Theatre, 2003)
- Hook-Ups (White Street Arts Center, 2001)

=== Publications ===
- "Catch the Wall" in The Kilroys List, Volume One: 97 Monologues and Scenes by Female and Trans Playwrights, ISBN 978-1559365352
- "Catch the Wall" in The Gptc Reader: 2016 Mainstage ISBN 978-0985907747
- More Pepper: Four Plays ISBN 978-0-07-2125757
- "Brian and Shevat" in Audition arsenal for women in their 20s ISBN 9781575253961

== Awards and residencies ==
Reisman is the winner of a 2016 Holland New Voices Award, a 2013 Austin Critics Table Award, and the 2011 Rosa Parks Playwriting Award from The Kennedy Center. Her plays appeared on the 2014, 2020, and 2023 Kilroys' Lists.

She has been a MacDowell Fellow and a resident of the Sundance Theatre Lab, Nashville Rep's Ingram New Works Lab, and New Victory LabWorks. She is an alum of the NNPN Playwright in Residence program and Page 73's I-73 Writers' Group. Reisman was a Core Writer at The Playwrights' Center from 2016 to 2019, and the 2022–23 Blain Quarnstrom Playwright in Residence at The University of Southern Mississippi.
