= Thisbe Nissen =

American author

Thisbe Nissen is an American author. Originally from New York City, she lived in Iowa for eleven years. Among her works are Osprey Island, The Good People of New York, and Out of the Girls' Room and into the Night. She has taught a fiction course at least once a year since the inception of the Iowa Young Writers' Workshop, a two-week intensive creative writing workshop "camp" for talented high school students, except in 2006. She has also taught at the Iowa Writers' Workshop, Iowa Elderhostel.

== Early life and education ==
Nissen is a graduate of Hunter College High School on Manhattan's Upper East Side. She attended Oberlin College, and received her Master of Fine Arts in Fiction from the Iowa Writers' Workshop at the University of Iowa, where she was a James Michener Fellow.

== Career ==
In 2007, she taught at the 3rd Annual Writers in Paradise at Eckerd College. In the spring of 2007, she was back in New York to teach at Columbia. After finishing a story collection called How Other People Make Love, Nissen is at work on a novel, and on several collaged picture books for children. From the fall of 2007 to the spring of 2009, she taught fiction workshops at Brandeis University in Waltham, Massachusetts. In 2010, she began a tenure-line appointment in the English Department at Western Michigan University, where she joined Jaimy Gordon, William Olsen, Nancy Eimers, Steve Feffer, and Richard Katrovas in the Creative Writing Program. She's married to writer Jay Baron Nicorvo.

== Works ==
Nissen's work has been published in Glimmer Train, Story, Story Quarterly, The Virginia Quarterly, Seventeen, Vogue, and Glamour. She is the author of the following books:

- Out of the Girls' Room and Into the Night: a collection of short stories and winner of the 1999 John Simmons Short Fiction Award. Dealing with many familiar issues in an unfamiliar way, Ms. Nissen tackles young women (and men) dealing with eating disorders, death, infidelity, and love.
- The Good People of New York: Nissen's first published novel (2001) is about the relationship between mother, Roz, and daughter, Miranda, as they travel through the hardships that life swings at them. Roz, a loud, confident Jewish woman living in New York, meets Edwin, a calm, quiet Nebraskan man at a party thrown by their mutual friend. From there on, they fall in love, get married, have a child, and have marital troubles.
- Osprey Island: this novel describes the weblike interrelations of an entire community, from the alcoholic Lance Squire, whose wife dies after falling asleep with a lit cigarette, to a romance between the resort owner's daughter Suzy Chizek and maintenance worker Roddy Jacobs.
- The Ex-Boyfriend Cookbook: They Came, They Cooked, They Left (But We Ended Up With Some Great Recipes), is a cookbook co-written with author Erin Ergenbright.
