= Rooftops of Tehran (poetry collection) =

- Author: Sholeh Wolpe
- Language: English
- Published: 2008
- Publisher: Ren Hen Press
- Publication place: United States
- ISBN: 978-1597091107

Rooftops of Tehran is a poetry collection by Sholeh Wolpe, published by Red Hen Press in 2008.

According to poet and scholar Tony Barnstone, "In Sholeh Wolpe’s Rooftops of Tehran, and unforgettable cast of characters emerges, from the morality policeman with the poison razor blade to the crow-girls flapping their black garments, from the woman with the bee-swarm tattoo emerging from her crotch to the author as a young girl on a Tehran rooftop with a God’s eye view ‘hovering above a city / where beatings, cheatings, prayers, songs, / and kindness are all one color’s shades.’ Here is a delicious book of poems, redolent of saffron and stained with pomegranate in its vision of Iran and of the immigrant life in California. Wolpe's poems are at once humorous, sad, and sexy, which is to say that they are capriciously human, human even in that they dream of wings and are always threatening to take flight.”

Professor Richard Katrovas lauds Wolpe's Rooftops of Tehran as "that truly rare event: an important book of poetry. Brushing against the grain of Persian-Islamic culture, she sings a deep affection for what she ruffles. Her righteous aversion to male oppression is as broad as the span from Tehran to L.A., as deep as a wise woman’s heart. This is a powerful, elegant book.”
