= Philip James DeVries =

American biologist

Philip J. DeVries
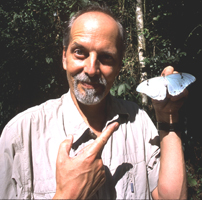
- Phil DeVries and Morpho catenaria
- Education: University of Michigan
- Spouse: Carla Penz (1997-present)
- Awards: Fulbright-Hayes Fellowship at The Natural History Museum (UK, 1982-1983); University of Texas Predoctoral Fellowship (1984-1985); Smithsonian Tropical Research Institute Predoctoral Fellowship (1985-1986); Smithsonian Tropical Research Institute Postdoctoral Fellowship (1987-1988); John D. & Catherine T. MacArthur Foundation Fellowship (1988-1993); Geraldine R. Dodge Foundation Fellowship (1993-1994); Honorable mention, Rolex Awards for Enterprise (1993); John Simon Guggenheim Memorial Foundation Fellowship (1996-1998); Biotropica Award for Excellence in Tropical Biology (2001); Elected one of 125 extraordinary University of Texas graduates (2010); Fulbright Program, Distinguished Visiting Professor at Universidade Estadual de Campinas, Brazil (2015)
- Scientific career
- Fields: Biologist
- Workplaces: University of New Orleans

Philip James DeVries (born March 7, 1952) is a tropical biologist whose research focuses on insect ecology and evolution, especially butterflies. His best-known work includes symbioses between caterpillars, ants and plants, and community level biodiversity of rainforest butterflies. DeVries is Professor Emeritus at the University of New Orleans, Research Associate at the American Museum of Natural History (NY), Florida Museum of Natural History (FL), and The Milwaukee Public Museum (WI).

== Biography ==
=== Early career ===
DeVries was born in Detroit, Michigan to Henry William DeVries and Helen Mary DeVries (née Brnabic). His early interest in Biology was nourished by close contact with nature during his childhood in rural Michigan. As an undergraduate student at the University of Michigan, Ann Arbor, DeVries was mentored in botany by professor Warren H. Wagner Jr., known among colleagues as "Herb". In 1975, DeVries received a Bachelor's degree from the School of Natural Resources, University of Michigan, with emphasis in botany. His early exposure to systematic botany continued to be useful in his career.

From 1975 to 1980, he was a curator of Lepidoptera at the Museo Nacional de Costa Rica as a Peace Corps volunteer where he built the country's first major butterfly collection. DeVries traveled widely in Costa Rica, collecting and making observations on butterflies. This eventually provided a large body of information that formed the basis for his two volumes entitled "The Butterflies of Costa Rica and their Natural History" (vol. 1 and 2). In Costa Rica, he interacted with many field biologists, including Daniel Janzen, Stephen P. Hubbell, Alwyn Gentry, Robin B. Foster, Lawrence E. Gilbert, Paul R. Ehrlich, and Russell Lande.

DeVries attended the University of Texas at Austin from 1980 to 1987, where he earned a PhD in Zoology. His doctoral work focused on the widespread symbioses between butterfly caterpillars, ants and plants, which he popularized under the nickname "Singing caterpillars". In 1982, DeVries received a fellowship from the Fulbright Program to visit The Natural History Museum in London (then British Museum of Natural History), where he spent a year preparing the first volume of his "The Butterflies of Costa Rica" book. There, he collaborated with Bernard d'Abrera and other curators and visitors deeply rooted in the history of butterfly biology, evolution and systematics.

In 1988, DeVries received a MacArthur Fellowship that allowed him to travel broadly in pursuit of tropical biology in Costa Rica, Panama, Ecuador, and Argentina. Through the MacArthur Fellows Program, he became close friends with the artists Lee Friedlander, Steve Lacy, John T. Scott, Brad Leithauser, and the historian Cornell Fleischer.

He was a pre-doctoral (1985–1986) and post-doctoral fellow (1987–1988) at the Smithsonian Tropical Research Institute, Panama, a visiting scholar at the University of Oxford, UK (1990–1991), an associate of the Center for Conservation Biology at Stanford University (1990–1992), and a Geraldine R. Dodge Foundation Fellow at Harvard University (1993–1994). He is a research associate of the American Museum of Natural History, Missouri Botanical Gardens, Museum of Comparative Zoology, Harvard University and the Natural History Museum of Los Angeles County.

Among other countries, DeVries has done field research in Costa Rica, Panama, Ecuador, Peru, Brazil, South Africa, Uganda, Tanzania, Madagascar, Bhutan, Australia, Borneo, Malaysia.

=== Later career ===
DeVries was an assistant professor at the University of Oregon (1994–2000), where he developed trapping methods to accrue long-term data sets on tropical butterfly communities. Work with his colleague Russell Lande produced some of the first rigorous insights into the spatial and temporal dynamics of diverse rainforest insect communities. From 2000 to 2004 he was the Director of the Center for Biodiversity Studies and curator of Lepidoptera at the Milwaukee Public Museum in Wisconsin.

He is presently an Emeritus professor at the University of New Orleans in Louisiana. DeVries continues to study long-term butterfly community diversity, and speciation. His butterfly trapping methods are used widely in tropical diversity studies and conservation efforts. He also continues work on evolution of butterfly-ant symbioses.

Recent honors include: in 2010, DeVries was elected one of 125 extraordinary University of Texas ex-graduates for the university's 125th anniversary; in 2012, the main-belt minor planet 89131 Phildevries was named in DeVries' honor by astronomer Bill Yeung.

== Singing caterpillars ==
DeVries discovered the substrate-borne calls produced by caterpillars that form symbioses with ants in the butterfly families Riodinidae and Lycaenidae. In these symbioses, ants provide protection against arthropod predators in exchange for food secretions. DeVries demonstrated experimentally that the calls produced by singing caterpillars function to enhance caterpillar-ant symbioses in concert with caterpillar glands that produce food and chemical secretions. He also has shown that singing caterpillars occur widely throughout the world. His studies were the first to show that acoustical calls of one insect species can evolve to attract unrelated species in the context of symbiotic associations, fitting into a field of biological science termed Bioacoustics. Documentation and examination of interactions between organisms of different species integrate the fields of natural history, ecology, and evolution.

== Natural history films ==
For decades, DeVries was involved with natural history documentary films as a writer, scientific advisor and on-camera presenter for production companies such as National Geographic, Partridge Films, Oxford Scientific Films, and Granada. Fifteen of these documentaries have been televised globally by National Geographic Channel, BBC Television and Scientific American Frontiers.

== Selected publications ==
Books

- DeVries, P.J. (1987). The Butterflies of Costa Rica and their Natural History. Volume I. Papilionidae, Pieridae and Nymphalidae. Princeton University Press, New Jersey, 327 pp.
- DeVries, P.J. (1997). The Butterflies of Costa Rica and their Natural History. Volume II. Riodinidae. Princeton University Press, New Jersey, 288 pp.

== Sources ==
- C. Ballard (2006), The Butterfly Hunter: Adventures of People who Found Their True Calling Way Off the Beaten Path, Publisher: Broadway (2006); ISBN 9780767918688
- Phil DeVries profile, Researchgate.net. Accessed March 30, 2024.
