= The Standard Grand =

2017 novel by Jay Baron Nicorvo

- Author: Jay Baron Nicorvo
- Publisher: St Martin's Press
- Publication date: 2017
- ISBN: 978-1250108944

The Standard Grand is a 2017 novel by American poet and novelist Jay Baron Nicorvo (St Martin's Press: ISBN 978-1250108944).

The Standard Grand was picked for IndieBound's Indie Next List, Library Journal's Debut Novels Great First Acts, Poets & Writers's "New and Noteworthy," and was named a best book of the year by The Brooklyn Rail.
