= Eva Galler =

Jewish Holocaust survivor

Eva Galler (née Vogel; January 1, 1922 – January 5, 2006) was a Jewish Holocaust survivor, born in Oleszyce, Poland. While being deported to the Belzec Extermination Camp, she escaped by jumping out the train window with her brother and sister. Her siblings were shot and killed as they fell out the train, but Galler managed to escape by landing in a deep hole.

She spent the rest of the war working on a farm in Germany and later moved to America. In her later life, she travelled to schools to speak to students about her story. During her lifetime, Eva Galler and her husband, Henry Galler, spoke to over 600,000 high school and middle school students about their experiences in World War II in an effort to educate them about tolerance and the need to overcome racism of any kind.

== Biography ==
Eva Vogel was born on January 1, 1924, in Oleszyce, Poland, a small community where over half of the people were Jews. She was the oldest of eight children. Her father, Israel Vogel, was a wealthy merchant and head of the Oleszyce Jewish community. He had an international business that distributed religious articles including Torahs and tefillin to France, Belgium, England, the US and other countries across the world. Galler's mother was Ita Prince from Jozefow.

During the occupation of Poland, the Nazis persecuted the Jews in the town, burning down synagogues and parading Jews through the streets. Galler vividly remembered seeing her Polish neighbours and former close friends laughing as their Jewish neighbours were humiliated and physically attacked. On October 14, 1942, Galler and her family, along with the other Jews in the community, were ordered to leave their homes and taken to the ghetto in Lubaczow. They were only allowed a short time to pack their belongings. While at the ghetto, a Jewish man, who had escaped from Belzec concentration camp, came to warn the inhabitants of the Lubaczow ghetto that Belzec was not a work camp but an extermination camp.

On January 4, 1943, when Galler was only seventeen years old, the Gestapo evacuated the Lubaczow ghetto. They put her family and many other Jews on a cattle train to take them to the Belzec death camp. Galler said in an interview, "my youngest brother was three years old and I still hear him screaming [in Yiddish, his preferred language], 'I want to live, too.'"

He died along with the rest of her family in the gas chambers at Belzac. Because they had heard such horrible things about Belzec, Eva's father lifted her and two younger siblings up to the small window in the cattle car and urged her and her siblings to jump out the train window to escape. Eva's brother, Berele (age 15 years) and sister, Hannah (age 16) were shot and killed by the Nazis patrolling the top of the trains, as they tried to jump off the moving train. She managed to avoid being shot, and she landed in a deep snow bank. She then hiked through the forest to Oleszyce where she was sheltered for a brief time by two Christian women whom she had helped in the past.

Although they were afraid to help her longer for fear of being caught, one of the women had a young daughter who had recently died. She was given a passport with the name "Katarina". She remembered that nobody helped her much after that and she had to survive on her own.

Galler eventually ended up in Sudetenland, on the German-Czechoslovak border, and worked on a farm throughout the rest of the war. While still working as a slave labourer, she was reunited with her sweetheart, Henry Galler, whom she had known before the war began. His own journey of survival in Siberia and later, as a soldier in the Polish division of the Russian army, led him to miraculously find Eva and to smuggle her out of Germany to safety in Sweden. After the war was over, Eva and Henry returned to Poland and found that out of the 3,000 Jewish people who lived in Oleszyce at the beginning of World War II, only 12 had survived the war.

Eva and Henry wed in Stockholm in 1946 and lived there for 8 years. At first they lived in poverty, off of a dishwashers' salary, but eventually Henry went to school and was eventually hired as a foreman in a clothing factory. During this time, Galler made blouses in the same factory. After three years in Sweden, their first child was born.

In 1956, the couple emigrated to the United States, living in New York City for seven years, and then settling in New Orleans. Galler had 3 daughters and 8 grandchildren.

In 1985, Galler graduated with a Bachelor of Arts degree from the University of New Orleans. She said in an interview that at first she did not want to talk about the war, but eventually she and Henry saw the necessity of educating others about their histories and the lessons they learned as teenage survivors of World War II.

== Death ==
Due to Hurricane Katrina, Galler and her husband moved to Dallas, Texas. Galler returned to New Orleans briefly after the city was reopened by the National Guard, but contracted pneumonia from toxic mold exposure during her return to her Katrina-ravaged home. She never recovered and died in Dallas on January 5, 2006, aged 82.
