= Patricia Snyder =

American sociologist

- Born: July 13, 1955 (age 71)

Academic background
- Education: B.S., 1977, State University of New York at Geneseo; M.Ed., 1981, Millersville University of Pennsylvania; PhD., 1992, University of New Orleans
- Thesis: Maternal and professional congruence in early intervention assessment: development, behavioral, and ecological comparisons (1992)
- Doctoral advisor: J. David Sexton

Academic work
- Institutions: Louisiana State University; Vanderbilt University; University of Florida

Patricia A. Snyder (born July 13, 1955) is an American sociologist. She is a distinguished professor and David Lawrence Jr. Endowed Chair in Early Childhood Studies at the University of Florida.

== Education ==
Snyder earned her Bachelor of Science at the State University of New York at Geneseo in 1977, followed by her Master of Education at Millersville University of Pennsylvania.

== Career ==
Snyder completed her pre-doctoral fellowship at the University of North Carolina at Chapel Hill before joining the faculty at Louisiana State University (LSU) in 1984. She eventually left LSU in 2005 to direct the Center for Child Development at Vanderbilt University Medical Center. She also served as editor of the Journal of Early Intervention from 2002 until 2007 and later Associate Editor for Topics in Early Childhood Special Education.

In 2007, Snyder was encouraged to leave Vanderbilt by David Lawrence, who appointed her the David Lawrence Jr. Endowed Chair in Early Childhood Studies at the University of Florida (UF). Upon her arrival at UF, Snyder began working towards founding the Anita Zucker Center for Excellence in Early Childhood Studies, which eventually opened in 2010. As a result of founding the center, Snyder was the recipient of the Mary McEvoy Service to the Field Award from the international Division for Early Childhood. While serving as director, Snyder, Brian Reichow, and Cinda Clark earned a contract with the Florida Early Steps program to evaluate and develop better professional development practices. The professional development included using practice-based, evidence-based caregiver coaching model and evidenced-based home visiting practices.

A few years later, Snyder was named an affiliate faculty member of the College of Medicine's Institute for Child Health Policy. She also received the Division for Early Childhood Award for Mentoring (DEC) from the Council for Exceptional Children. On June 27, 2019, Snyder became the seventh College of Education professor to be appointed a Distinguished Professor in UF's history.
