= Jeffrey Gangwisch =

American artist

JLS Gangwisch (born 1985 in Philadelphia, Pennsylvania) is a filmmaker, photographer and Fulbright Scholar. They attended University of New Orleans, where they studied film production and fine art, and University College Falmouth in the UK, where they studied television production.

They were the first Fulbright Scholar to be assigned to Cornwall, England.

Their current work employs new media technologies to explore "the materiality of the human body."
