= Robert L. Flurry =

American chemist (1933–2008)

Robert Luther Flurry Jr. (November 15, 1933 – September 3, 2008) was an American chemistry professor at the University of New Orleans, noted for his advances in molecular orbital theory and quantum chemistry.

== Early life and career ==
Flurry served in the U.S. Navy as a musician before pursuing his academic career. He received his B.A., M.S., and Ph.D. degrees from Emory University and completed post-doctoral studies at the Illinois Institute of Technology.

In 1962, Flurry joined the faculty of the University of New Orleans, where he remained until his retirement.

== Publications and impact ==
His 1969 study of electron donor–acceptor complexes is highly cited, and his research on electron donor–acceptor complexes is noted in modern historical treatments of noncovalent interactions in chemistry.

Flurry authored three chemistry textbooks that received significant attention in the academic community:

- Flurry, Robert L. (1968). Molecular Orbital Theories of Bonding in Organic Molecules. Marcel Dekker. LCCN 68-13563.
- Flurry, Robert L. (1980). Symmetry Groups: Theory and Chemical Applications. Prentice-Hall. ISBN 0-13-880013-8.
- Flurry, Robert L. (1983). Quantum Chemistry: An Introduction. Prentice-Hall. ISBN 0-13-747832-1.

== Death ==
Flurry died on September 3, 2008, from complications related to Parkinson's disease after a 25-year struggle with the condition.
