= Oleszyce =

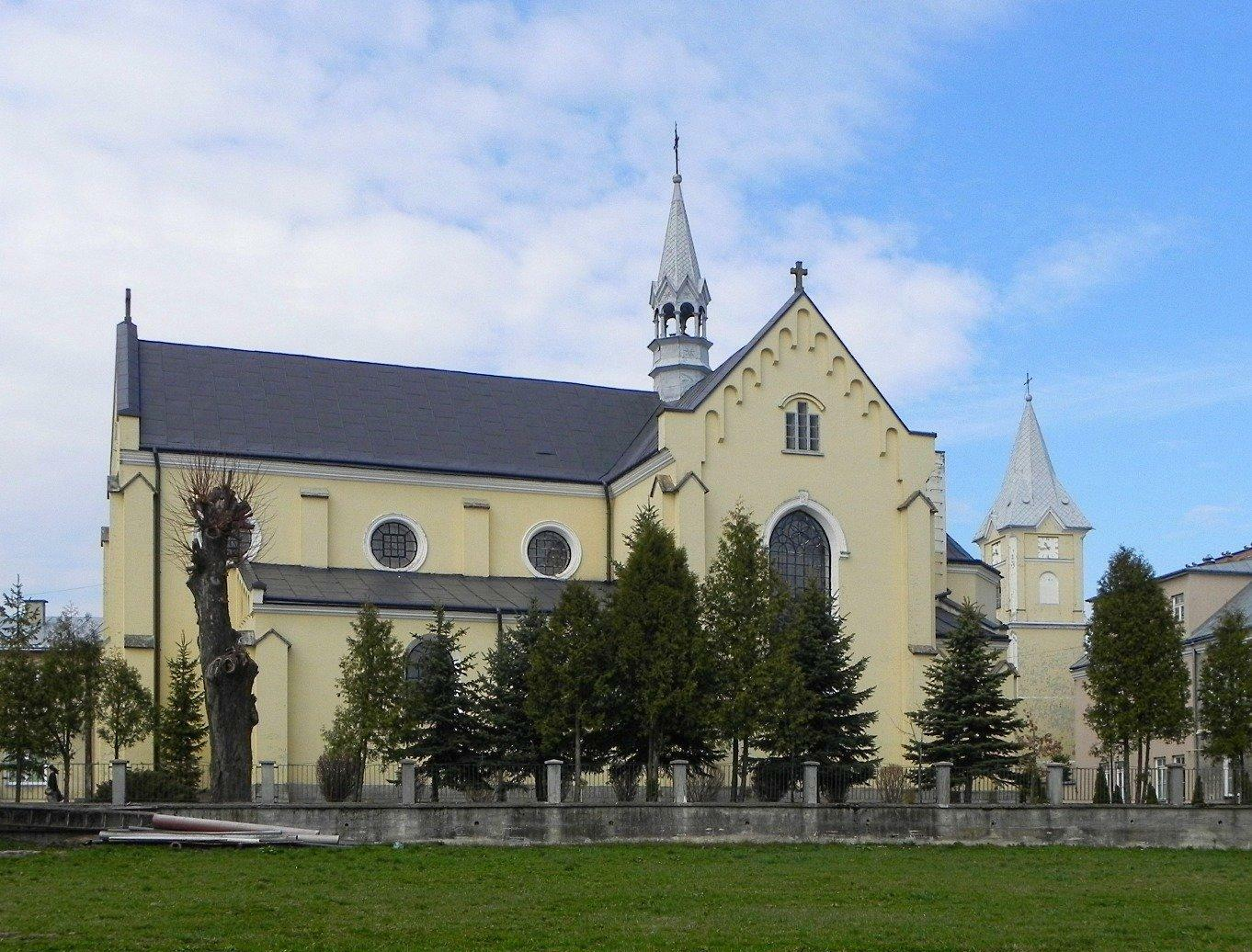
- Church of the Nativity of the Virgin Mary

- Coat of arms

- Location within Poland
- Coordinates: 50°10′1″N 23°1′51″E
- Country: Poland
- Voivodeship: Subcarpathian
- County: Lubaczów
- Gmina: Oleszyce
- Town rights: 1576

Government
  - Mayor: Michał Jabłoński

Area
  - Total: 4.98 km^{2} (1.92 sq mi)

Population (2006)
  - Total: 3,168
  - Density: 636/km^{2} (1,650/sq mi)
- Time zone: UTC+1 (CET)
  - Summer (DST): UTC+2 (CEST)
- Postal code: 37-630
- Car plates: RLU
- Website: http://www.oleszyce.pl/

Oleszyce [ɔlɛˈʂɨt͡sɛ] (Note: Ukrainian: Олешичі, Oleshychi) is a town in Lubaczów County, Subcarpathian Voivodeship, Poland, with 3,089 inhabitants (02.06.2009). It is situated on the Przerwa River.

== History ==
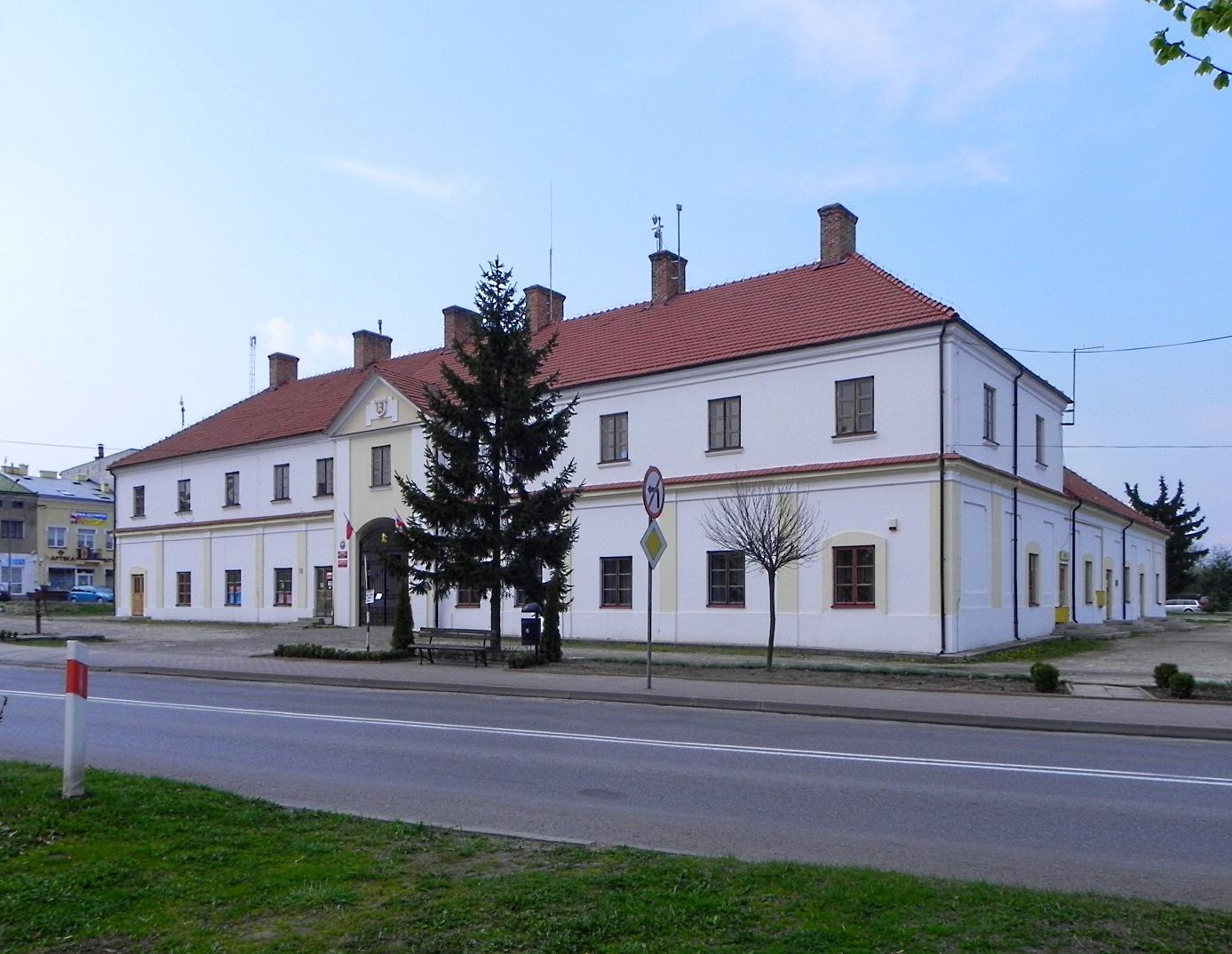
Historic town hall

The history of Oleszyce dates back to the early 15th century. It was first mentioned in documents from 1431, as Heleschicze; its name was also spelled as Olieschicze, Oleczyce and Olessicze, and probably comes from male name Olech or Olesz. In 1458, a wooden Roman Catholic parish church was built here by the Ramsza family, owners of the village.

In 1570, Oleszyce became property of Voivode of Ruthenia, Hieronim Jarosz Sieniawski, who in 1576 established here a town named Hieronimów, based on Magdeburg rights. The town was located between the already existing village, and a manor house, and its charter was confirmed by King Stephen Bathory on February 26, 1578. The name Hieronimów was seldom used, and by mid-17th century, disappeared, replaced by ancient name Oleszyce. It was a private town, administratively located in the Bełz Voivodeship in the Lesser Poland Province.

In the mid-17th century, Hieronimów/Oleszyce had 107 houses and over 1000 residents, with Catholic and Orthodox churches. In the early 18th century, Oleszyce became main center of properties of the noble Sieniawski family: here, in 1706, a secret meeting between Crown Hetman Adam Mikołaj Sieniawski and Saxon envoy named Spiegel took place.

Across centuries, Oleszyce was frequently raided and destroyed by Crimean Tatars (1498, 1624, 1672), Zaporozhian Cossacks (1610, 1629, 1648), burned in fires (1710, 1726), its population was also decimated by plagues (1626, 1641).

In 1731, Oleszyce became property of the Czartoryski family. After the First Partition of Poland, the town belonged to Austrian Galicia (1772–1918), but remained private property of the families of Działyński, Potocki, Potulicki and Sapieha. In 1880, Oleszyce lost its town charter.

In the Second Polish Republic, Oleszyce was part of Cieszanów County in the Lwów Voivodeship. According to the 1921 census, it had a population of 2,917, 26.0% Polish, 51.7% Jewish and 21.9% Ukrainian.

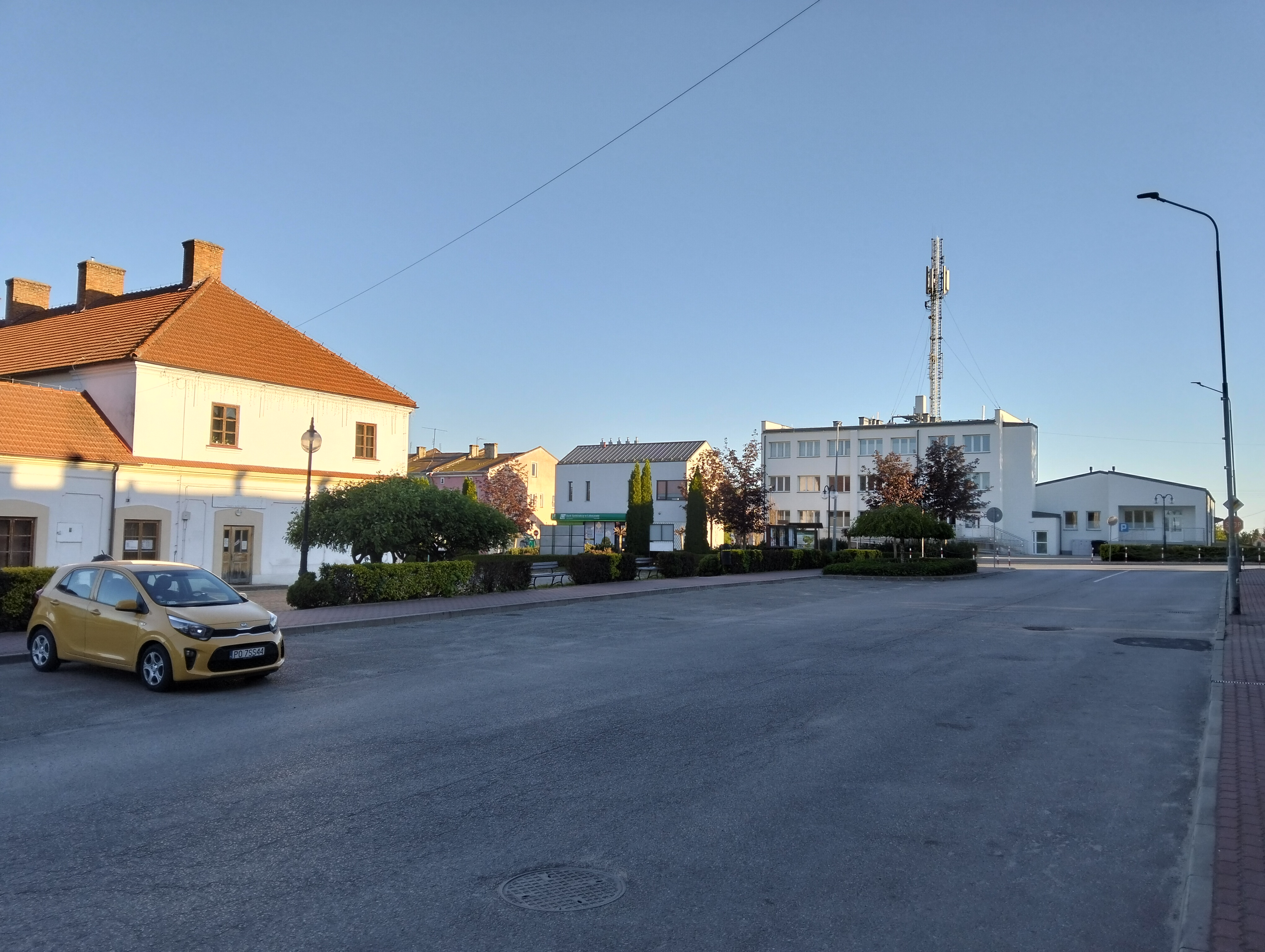
Market square in Oleszyce

=== World War II ===
During the invasion of Poland at the start of World War II, the town was captured by the Wehrmacht on September 12, 1939. A few days later, heavy fighting between the advancing Germans and retreating Polish 21st Mountain Infantry Division took place in the area of Oleszyce, in which General Józef Kustroń was killed (September 16).

German presence in Oleszyce was short, as on September 20, the village was occupied by the Red Army. On 15 November, Oleszyce was annexed to the Soviet Union as part of the Ukrainian SSR, and German-Soviet boundary was established a few kilometers north of the village (see also Molotov–Ribbentrop Pact). In June 1941, the NKVD murdered a number of prisoners, kept in the local castle (see NKVD prisoner massacres).

In November 1942, the Germans displaced more than 2.000 Jews from Oleszyce to the Lubaczów ghetto, established on October 8, 1942. According to one source, about 1.000 of these Jews were sent to the Belzec extermination camp before the end of November. After the liquidation of the Lubaczów ghetto in January 1943, many Jews ran away and went into hiding in Oleszyce and its surroundings. From January until March 1943, more than 127 Jews from Oleszyce and neighboring villages were executed in the Jewish cemetery.

After World War II, the village and its area was affected by the activities of the Ukrainian Insurgent Army, which in the night of September 5/6, 1945, attacked Oleszyce with the rail station. Ukrainian nationalists were defeated by Polish Army battalion, but before that happened, they managed to burn down several houses.

== Notable people ==
- Eva Galler (1924–2006), Jewish Holocaust survivor
