= Carla Penz =

American entomologist

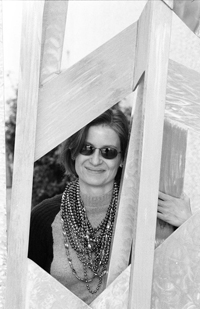
- Carla Penz at John T. Scott’s Spirit Gate (Photo by Phil DeVries)
- Education: University of Texas at Austin; Federal University of Rio Grande do Sul
- Spouse: Philip James DeVries (1997-present)
- Scientific career
- Fields: Comparative morphology
- Workplaces: University of New Orleans

Carla Maria Penz (born October 17, 1961) is a butterfly comparative morphologist and systematist, and the former Doris Zemurray Stone Chair in Biodiversity at the University of New Orleans. Her research also focuses on natural history and behavior, mostly of neotropical butterflies. She is currently Professor Emeritus at the University of New Orleans, Research Associate at the American Museum of Natural History (NY), Florida Museum of Natural History (FL), and The Milwaukee Public Museum (WI).

== Biography ==
Carla Penz was born in Porto Alegre, Brazil, the first-born daughter of Rubem Paulo Penz and Isolde Renate Penz (née Seth). Through her father’s love for nature and orchids, in particular, she developed an interest in biology from an early age. Penz attended the Jesuit school Colégio Anchieta, where she was also encouraged to pursue a career in science. As an undergraduate at Universidade Federal do the Rio Grande do Sul (UFRGS), she volunteered at Museu Anchieta, where she started to study butterflies.

Penz obtained her doctorate degree at the University of Texas at Austin. During that period she traveled to several countries for field and museum work, such as Costa Rica, Panama, Ecuador, Brazil, and England where she spent time at Cambridge University and the Natural History Museum, London. She was funded by the National Science Foundation for post-doctoral work at the DeVries Laboratory at the University of Oregon (1996-2000). She worked as a Curator of Lepidoptera (2000-2004) and Section Head of Invertebrate Zoology (2003-2004) at the Milwaukee Public Museum in Wisconsin. Penz joined the faculty at the University of New Orleans in 2004, where she is currently an Emeritus professor. She is also a research associate at the American Museum of Natural History and the Milwaukee Public Museum, and an associate professor at PUC-RS, Brazil.

Along her career, Penz has studied butterfly genetics, natural history, herbivore-plant interactions, wing morphology as related to flight, and phylogenetic systematics. Morphology is the main source of data for her work on phylogenetic systematics, a field of biology that focuses on the evolutionary diversification of living organisms. Her research integrates morphological and evolutionary diversification, and also natural history and behavior of her study organisms.

== Selected publications ==
- Penz, C.M. 2021. Phylogeny of Amathusiini butterflies based on adult morphology (Lepidoptera, Nymphalidae, Satyrinae). Zootaxa, 5067(2), 151-186
- Crees, L. D., DeVries, P. & Penz, C.M. 2021. Do hind wing eyespots of Caligo butterflies function in both mating behavior and anti-predator defense? (Lepidoptera, Nymphalidae). Annals of the Entomological Society of America, 114, 329-337
- Penz, C.M. 2021. Revised species definitions and nomenclature of the blue and purple/rose Cithaerias butterflies (Lepidoptera, Nymphalidae, Satyrinae). Zootaxa, 4963 (2): 293–316.
- Penz, C. & Williams, S.F. 2020. Wing morphology and body design in Opsiphanes and Caligo butterflies match the demands of male mating displays (Lepidoptera: Nymphalidae). Annals of the Entomological Society of America, 113: 207-215.
- Matos-Maraví, P., Wahlberg, N., Antonelli, A. & Penz, C.M. 2019. Species limits in butterflies (Lepidoptera: Nymphalidae): Reconciling classical taxonomy with the multispecies coalescent. Systematic Entomology, 44:745-756.
- Penz, C.M., Casagrande, M.M., DeVries, P.J. & Simonsen, T.J. 2017. Documenting diversity in the Amazonian butterfly genus Bia (Lepidoptera, Nymphalidae). Zootaxa, 4258(3):201-237.
- Pinheiro, C.E.G., Freitas, A.V.L., Campos, V.C., DeVries, P.J. & Penz, C.M. 2016. Both palatable and unpalatable butterflies use bright colors to signal difficulty of capture to predators. Neotropical Entomology, 45: 107-113.
- Penz, C.M., DeVries, P.J. Tufto, J. & Lande, R.S. 2015. Butterfly dispersal across Amazonia and its implication for biogeography. Ecography, 38: 410-418.
- Penz, C.M., Alexander, L.G. & DeVries, P.J. 2014. Revised species definitions and nomenclature of the rose colored Cithaerias butterflies (Lepidoptera, Nymphalidae, Satyrinae). Zootaxa, 3873 (5): 541–559
- Penz, C.M. & N. Mohammadi. 2013. Wing pattern diversity in Brassolini butterflies (Nymphalidae, Satyrinae). Biota Neotropica, 13(3):1-27.
- Penz, C.M., A.V.L. Freitas, L.A. Kaminski, M.M. Casagrande & P.J. DeVries. 2013. Adult and early-stage characters of Brassolini contain conflicting phylogenetic signal (Lepidoptera, Nymphalidae). Systematic Entomology, 38: 316–333.
- Garzón-Orduna, I.J., Marini-Filho, O., Johnson, S. & Penz, C.M. 2013. Phylogenetic relationships of Hamadryas (Nymphalidae: Biblidinae) based on the combined analysis of morphological and molecular data. Cladistics (2013), online early DOI: 10.1111/cla.12021
- Penz, C.M., N. Wahlberg & P. DeVries. 2012. Diversification of Morpho butterflies (Lepidoptera, Nymphalidae): a re-evaluation of morphological characters and new insight from DNA sequence data. Systematic Entomology, 37: 670–685.
- Penz, C.M., N. Mohammadi & N. Wahlberg. 2011. Neotropical Blepolenis butterflies: wing pattern elements, phylogeny, and Pleistocene diversification (Lepidoptera, Nymphalidae). Zootaxa, 2897:1–17.
- Penz, C.M., T.J. Simonsen & P. DeVries. 2011. A new Orobrassolis butterfly (Nymphalidae, Brassolini): a casualty of habitat destruction? Zootaxa, 2740:35-43.
- DeVries, P.J., C.M. Penz & R. Hill. 2010. Vertical distribution, flight behavior, and evolution of wing morphology in Morpho butterflies. Journal of Animal Ecology, 79:1077-1085.

== Other sources ==
- University of New Orleans Department of Biological Sciences
- Carla Penz Web Page
- Carla Penz - Research gate
- Phil DeVries Web Page
- Yanayacu Biological Station & Center for Creative Studies
