= Richard A. Johnson =

American artist

Richard A. Johnson is an artist and retired professor in the Fine Arts department at the University of New Orleans.
