= LSU New Orleans =

Public university in New Orleans, Louisiana, U.S.

- Former names: Louisiana State University in New Orleans (1956–1974); University of New Orleans (1974–2026)
- Type: Public research university
- Established: 1956; 70 years ago
- Parent institution: Louisiana State University System
- Accreditation: SACS
- Academic affiliations: GCU; ORAU; Space-grant
- Endowment: $25.8 million (2021)
- Chancellor: Jeanette Weiland (interim)
- Provost: Darrell P. Kruger
- Academic staff: 728 full-time and 153 part-time
- Students: 6,501
- Undergraduates: 5,419
- Postgraduates: 1,082
- Location: New Orleans, Louisiana, U.S. 30.0275°N 90.0671°W
- Campus: Urban, 195 acres (79 ha)
- Colors: Privateer Purple and Gold
- Nickname: Privateers
- Sporting affiliations: NCAA Division I – Southland
- Mascot: Captain BrUNO
- Website: www.lsuneworleans.edu

LSU New Orleans (LSUNO), known from 1974 to 2026 as the University of New Orleans (UNO), is a public research university in New Orleans, Louisiana, United States. First opened in 1958 as Louisiana State University in New Orleans (LSUNO), it was renamed the University of New Orleans in 1974 until reverting to its LSU name in 2026. It is the largest public university and one of two doctoral research universities in the Greater New Orleans region. LSUNO is a member of the Louisiana State University System and is classified among "R2: Doctoral Universities – High research activity". The university consists of eight schools and colleges offering 46 bachelor's, 40 master's and 17 doctoral degree programs. Among its academic offerings are the only mechanical and electrical engineering undergraduate programs in New Orleans, the only graduate hospitality and tourism program and PAB-accredited urban planning program in the state of Louisiana, and one of the few schools of naval architecture and marine engineering in the United States.

LSUNO's 195-acre main campus is located on the shores of Lake Pontchartrain in Gentilly, New Orleans. The university's East Campus houses athletic facilities including Maestri Field and the UNO Lakefront Arena. LSUNO also owns and operates a research and technology park adjacent to its main campus.

The university's athletic teams are the Privateers. A total of 14 Privateer teams compete in the NCAA Division I Southland Conference.

== History ==
State Senator Theodore M. Hickey of New Orleans in 1956 authored the act which established the University of New Orleans. At the time New Orleans was the largest metropolitan area in the United States without a public university though it had several private universities, such as Tulane (which was originally a state-supported university before being privatized in 1884), Loyola, and Dillard. The institution was a branch of Louisiana State University, and as such was originally named "Louisiana State University in New Orleans." The UNO University Ballroom was named in Hickey's honor late in 2014, more than two decades after his death.

The university was built on the New Orleans Lakefront when the United States Navy relocated Naval Air Station New Orleans. The Orleans Levee Board leased the closed base to the LSU Board of Supervisors. The renovation went quicker than expected. LSUNO opened for classes in 1958, two years ahead of schedule. It was one of the first racially integrated public universities in the South, trailing the 1954 desegregation of the Southwestern Louisiana Institute. For its first five years, it was reckoned as an offsite department of the main campus in Baton Rouge, and as such its chief administrative officer was originally called a dean (1958–1961), then a vice president in charge (1961–1962) who reported to LSU's president. In 1962, the LSU System of Higher Education was established, and LSUNO became a separate campus in that system. To signify that it was now a co-equal institution with LSU, its chief executive's title was changed from "vice president in charge" to "chancellor." After a decade of growth, the LSU Board of Supervisors approved a name change to "University of New Orleans." Nearly fifty years later, in 2011, the University of New Orleans was transferred from LSU to the University of Louisiana system, and its chief executive's title was changed to "president."

In 2025, state lawmakers voted to return UNO to the LSU system in July 2026. At that time, the university was renamed "LSU New Orleans."

=== Hurricane Katrina ===
On August 29, 2005, the university suffered damage due to Hurricane Katrina. The main campus is on relatively high ground, so the damage was caused mostly by winds, rain-driven-water, and human activity during the storm. The university was used as an evacuation point and staging area by the National Guard. A levee breach on the London Avenue Canal occurred just a few blocks south of the main campus and caused the flooding of the first floor of the Bienville Hall dormitories, the Lafitte Village couples apartments, and the Engineering Building.

UNO was the first of the large, damaged universities in New Orleans to re-open, albeit virtually, by using web-based courses starting in October 2005. The university was able to offer classes in the fall semester immediately following Hurricane Katrina at satellite campuses; the main campus re-opened in December 2005.

Hurricane Katrina reduced enrollments at all colleges in New Orleans, but the University of New Orleans was particularly hard hit. This echoed the damage to New Orleans as a whole, since UNO serves as a leader in educating students from New Orleans. Since the hurricane, the student enrollment is on a steady increase toward pre-Katrina numbers.

=== Impacts from the COVID-19 pandemic ===
While the COVID-19 pandemic caused a drop in enrollment at universities across the United States, the University of New Orleans was particularly hard hit for a variety of reasons. Partially due to a large portion of UNO's non-traditional student base seeking education at non-traditional online universities, a failure to truly have in-person classes for traditional students in the years following COVID, and subsequent hurricanes the years following, UNO's enrollment hit record lows, close to its post-Katrina numbers. Because of this, less than a year after her appointment to the position, President Kathy Johnson laid off numerous employees and shrunk budgets by over 15% during the summer of 2024. The following year, university administrators announced a $10 million budget deficit and began mandatory furloughs for university employees.

=== Transition to LSU New Orleans ===
Following a March 2025 recommendation by the Louisiana Board of Regents to address a growing $30 million budget deficit and declining enrollment, state leaders approved transferring the University of New Orleans back to the Louisiana State University System. On July 1, 2026, the institution officially returned to its founding parent system and was rebranded as LSU New Orleans. The transition aimed to resolve the university's fiscal crisis, leverage LSU's broader resources, and revitalize the Lakefront campus and surrounding areas.

=== Chief executives ===
- Homer L. Hitt (dean, 1958–59; VP in charge, 1959–1963, chancellor, 1963–1980)
- Leon J. Richelle (chancellor, 1980–1983)
- Cooper Mackin (chancellor, 1983–1987; acting to 1984)
- Gregory M. St. L. O'Brien (chancellor, 1987–2003)
- Timothy P. Ryan (chancellor, 2003–2010)
- Joe King (acting chancellor, 2010–2012)
- Peter J. Fos (president, 2012–2016)
- John W. Nicklow (president, 2016–2023)
- Jeannine O'Rourke (interim president, May 2023–October 2023)
- Kathy Johnson (president, November 2023–June 2026)
- Jeanette R. Weiland (interim chancellor, July 2026–Present)

== Student life ==
Undergraduate demographics as of Fall 2023
Race and ethnicity	Total
White	42%
Black	23%
Hispanic	15%
Asian	9%
Two or more races	5%
International student	3%
Unknown	3%
Economic diversity
Low-income (Note: The percentage of students who received an income-based federal Pell grant intended for low-income students.)	46%
Affluent (Note: The percentage of students who are a part of the American middle class at the bare minimum.)	54%

=== Organizations ===
There are more than 120 registered clubs and organizations active at LSUNO, including roughly 15 fraternities and sororities. LSUNO Student Government is the official student government association. Registered organizations are separated into categories of either religious, honorary, political, professional, social, service, organizations, or special interests.

=== Media ===
The Driftwood was the LSUNO weekly newspaper and was published every Thursday. LSUNO also owns and operates WWNO, a local radio station. WWNO began transmitting in 1972.

=== Greek life ===
The Greek community at the University of New Orleans is composed of about 15 fraternities and sororities.

== Colleges ==
Academic rankings

National
- Forbes: 616
- U.S. News & World Report: 293–381
- Washington Monthly: 269

LSU New Orleans has four colleges: College of Business Administration, College of Liberal Arts, Education and Human Development, College of Engineering, and College of Sciences. The university also offers a bachelor's degree in Interdisciplinary Studies.

== Campus ==
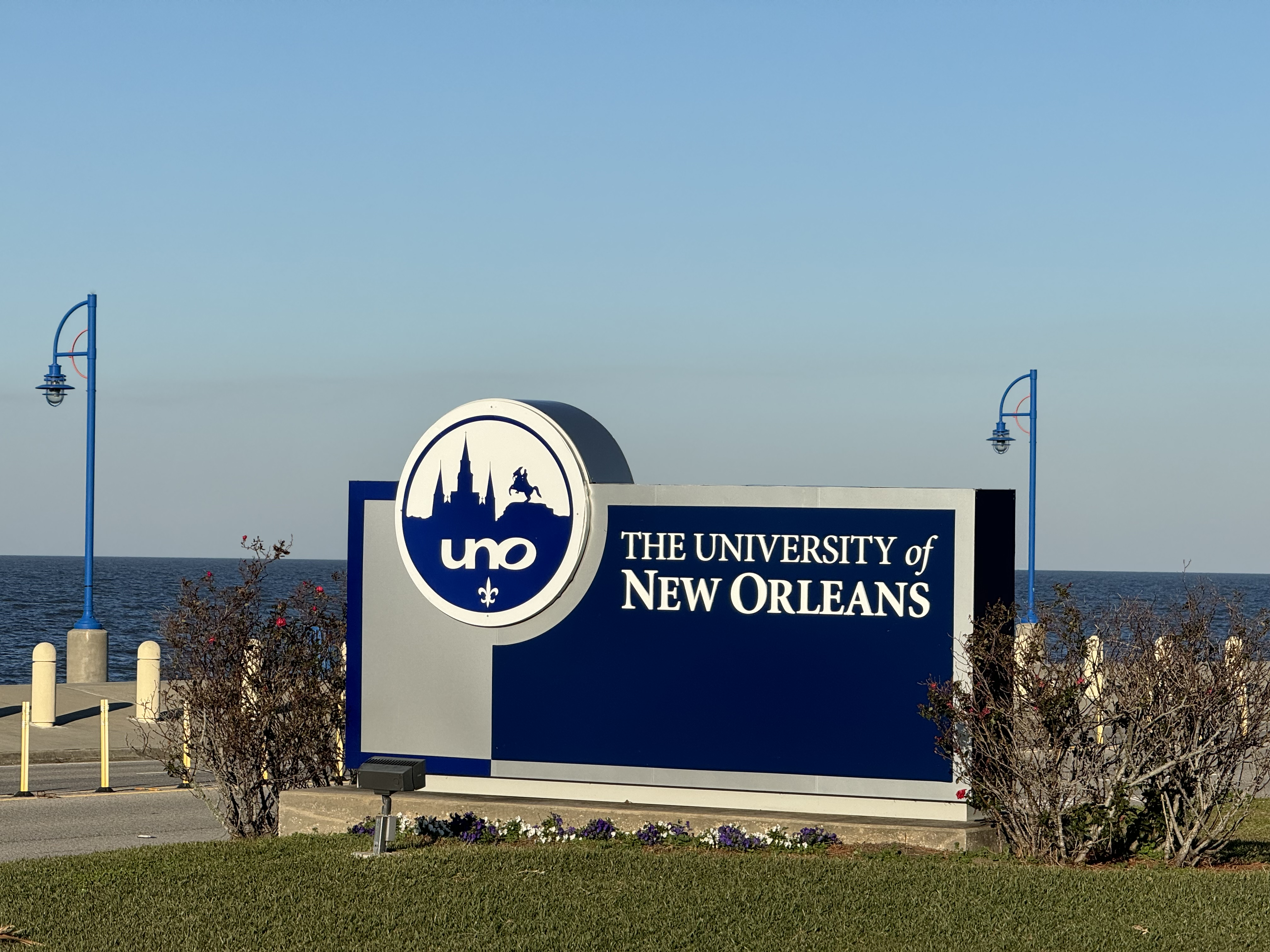
The entrance to the University of New Orleans, on the Lake Pontchartrain side

The university's campus is located in the New Orleans metropolitan area, sitting on Lake Pontchartrain at the end of Elysian Fields Avenue and on the former site of NAS New Orleans. The LSUNO Research and Technology Park, referred to as "The Beach" is located adjacent to campus on the former site of the Pontchartrain Beach amusement park. The Kiefer LSUNO Lakefront Arena and Maestri Field at Privateer Park, LSUNO's basketball and baseball facilities, are located at the corner of Franklin Avenue and Leon C. Simon Boulevard.

LSUNO's classes were originally housed in the remaining buildings following the closure of NAS New Orleans at that site. As a nod to campus' time as a Naval base, the oldest lecture buildings completed in 1960, the Liberal Arts Building and the Science Building, are both numbered and laid-out like a ship with Liberal Arts featuring exterior balconies for access to the classrooms as opposed to interior hallways, and both Liberal Arts and Science featuring two central courtyards in each building.

Throughout the years, additional permanent buildings were built to accommodate a larger student body. These include Milneburg Hall (1969), the University Center (1969), the Human Performance Center (1969), the Earl K. Long Library (1970), the Geology/Psychology Building (1972), the Bicentennial Education Building (1976), the Engineering Building (1987), the Life Sciences Complex (Phase 1: the Computer Center, Phase 2: the Biology Building, and Phase 3: the Mathematics Building; All completed between 1979 and 1984), the Chemical-Sciences Annex (1997), and Kirschman Hall (2004).

The College of Engineering building is the tallest building on campus. It has nine floors and is home to the university's Naval Architecture and Marine Engineering (NAME) Program, among other engineering programs.

Two buildings on campus feature atrium designs as opposed to hallways. Kirschman Hall, the newest lecture building on campus and home of the College of Business Administration, features a large atrium in the center with a few satellite hallways connecting to it. It is considered to be the second largest lecture building on campus (after the engineering building).

Due to the impacts of low enrollment and chronic maintenance issues in these buildings, the university has officially decommissioned two campus buildings, Milneburg Hall and the Liberal Arts Building. These buildings had the most significant deferred maintenance challenges on campus, and significant asbestos mitigation projects would have been required. The buildings are currently vacant on the campus with future plans to demolish Milneburg Hall.

In addition to the closures of these buildings, the University decided to enter a long-term lease with Benjamin Franklin High School to convert the Human Performance Center (the former home of athletics) to a satellite building for Franklin. This helps reduce LSUNO's footprint as Franklin was using classrooms in the Bicentennial Education Building across campus, which is housing various departments from Milneburg and Liberal Arts. This building is also much closer to the main Franklin campus.

=== Campus life centers ===
The University of New Orleans features three buildings that are considered to be the centers of campus life:

==== Earl K. Long Library ====
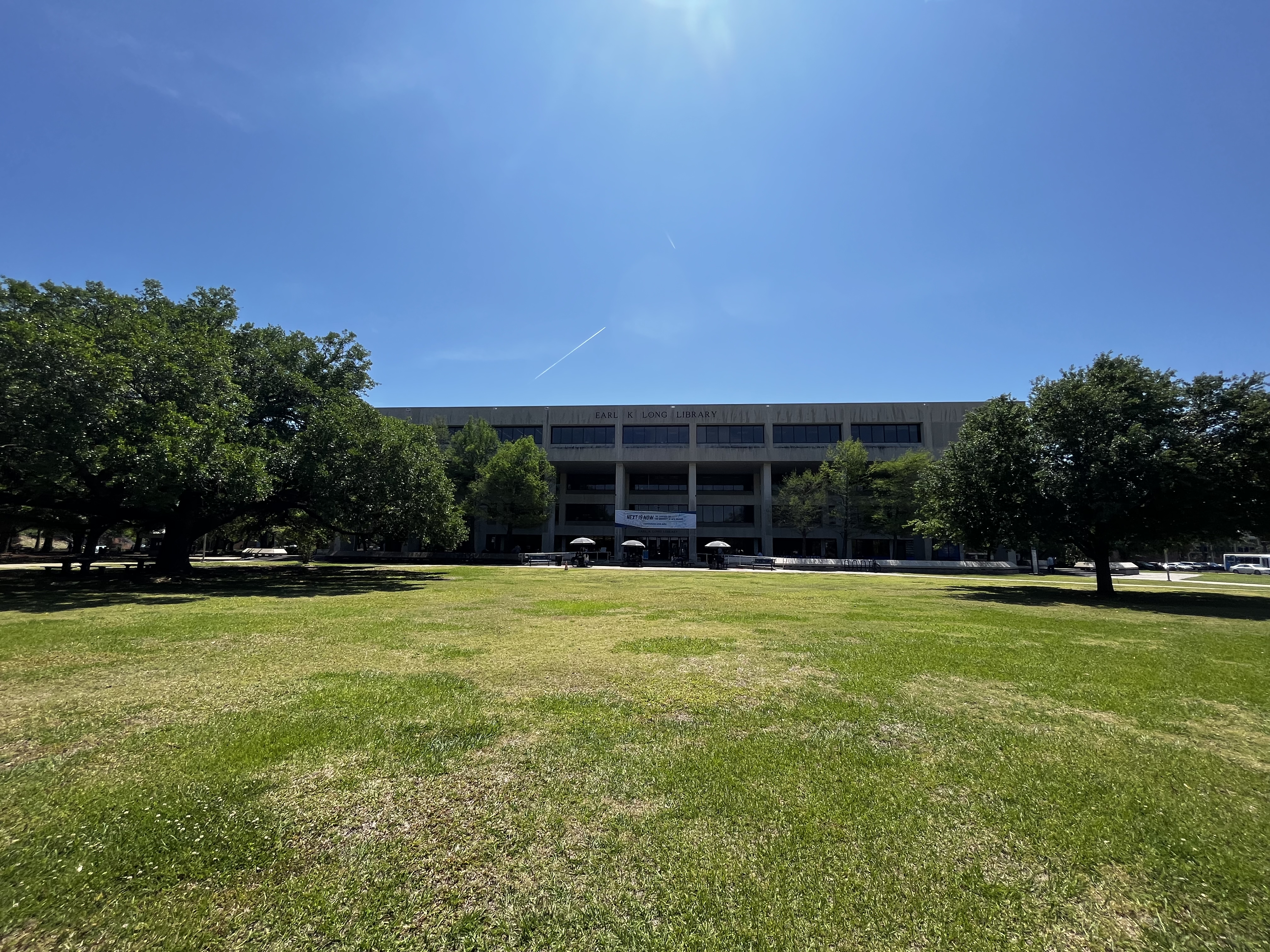
Earl K. Long Library

The Earl K. Long Library is home to the Privateer Enrollment Center, which is "a one-stop shop for all your enrollment needs." This location includes offices of Enrollment, Orientation, the Bursar, Financial Aid, and Academic Advising. Not only is this building home to many enrollment services, but this building also has a Coffee Shop run by dining services and different academic resources on each floor. The first floor is home to a large study area known as the "Learning Commons" which is home to a large computer lab in the front, an open-concept study area in the rear, the offices of Student Accountability/Disability Services & the Learning Resource Center, and group study room. The second floor is home to quiet computers, additional group study rooms, periodicals, the Women's Center, and the LSUNO Press. The third floor houses the silent study room, the honors program, the innovation suite, the meditation area, and private study rooms for faculty and graduate students. The fourth floor is where the quiet study area, the special collections/archives, the reading room, various conferences rooms, and additional offices are located.

==== University Center ====
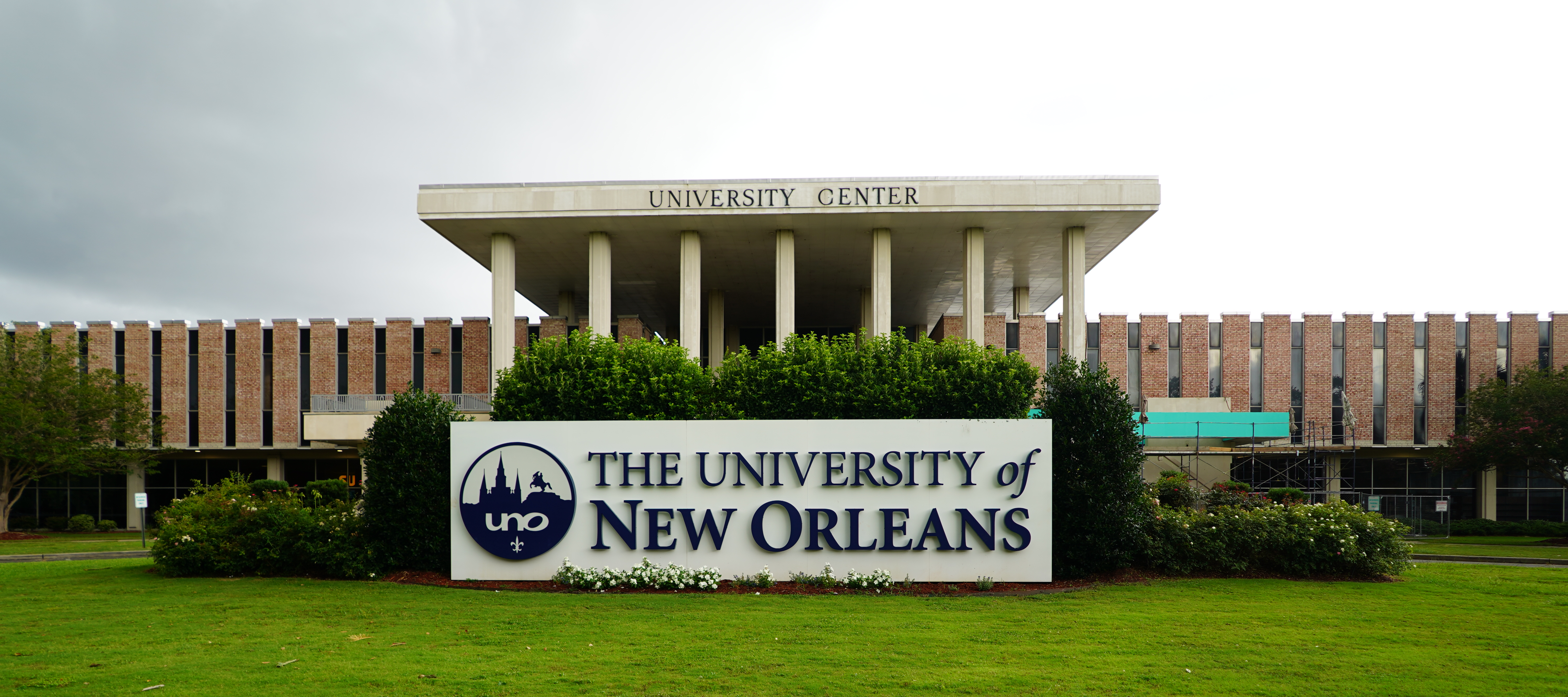
University Center

The university center is "the center of campus life at LSUNO." The building is home to dining services locations, the grand ball room, the Captain's Quarter's Game Room, the LSUNO Bookstore, and various meeting spaces. University offices located here include counseling services, career services, student involvement and leadership, Greek life, student government association, student affairs, the HUB, the student pantry, student transitions, and the Juan LaFonta Diversity Engagement Center. It is also home to an Oschner Health Clinic and various leisure spaces. The lobby of the building features a large atrium with flags hanging down. These are placed the first time a student comes to the university from another nation.

==== Administration Building ====
The Administration Building consists of two sections: the original administration building and the newer administration annex, an addition to the building that was built later. Many university administrative offices are located here though these are typically administrative and not often visited by students. However, the main office for the graduate school is located here and not in the Library.

=== Residential life ===
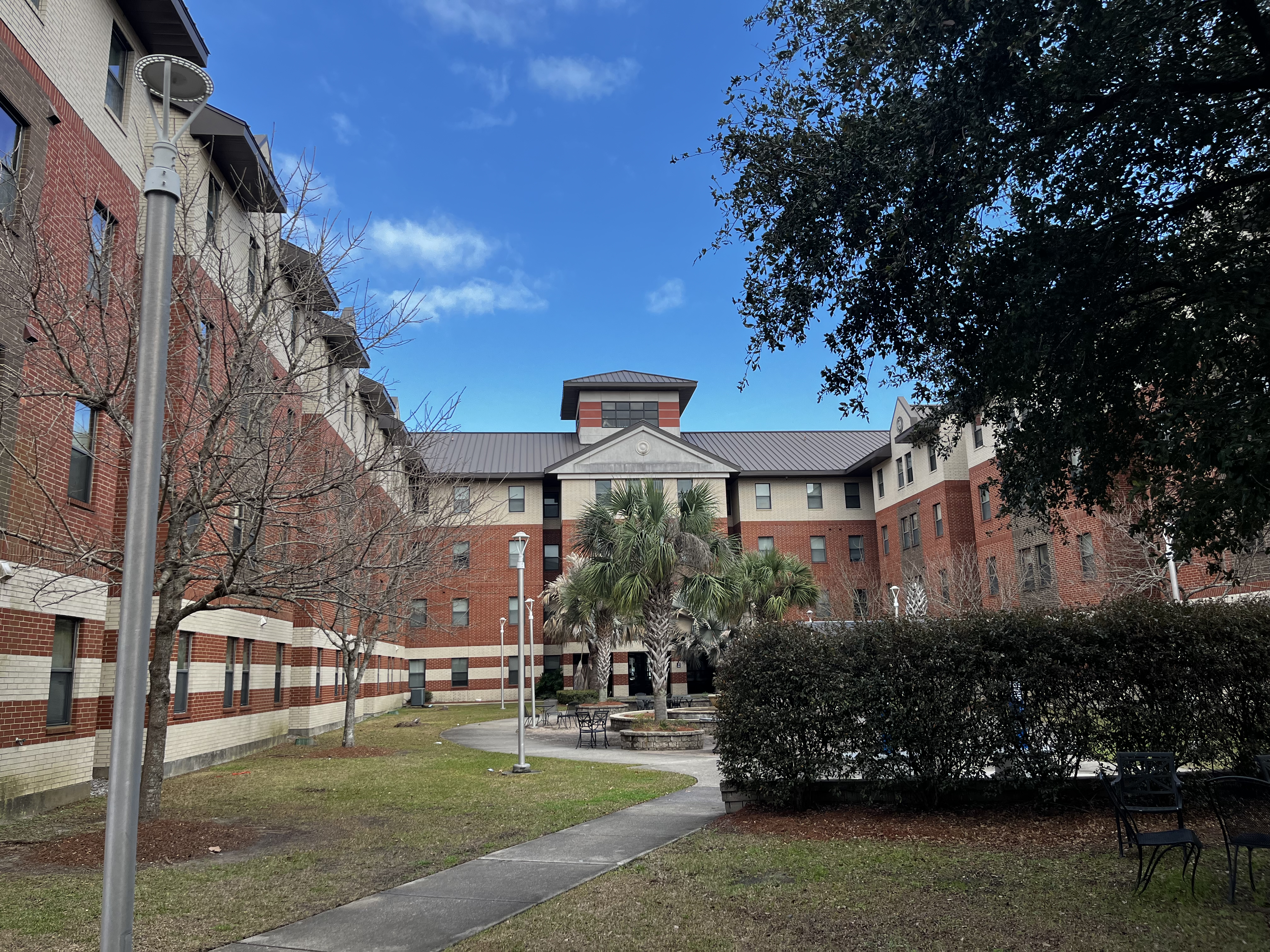
Pontchartrain Hall

The university's campus is home to four on-campus housing options for students all located on LSUNO's main campus:

- Pontchartrain Halls
- Privateer Place
- Lafitte Village
- The TRAC (Sorority Residence)

Prior to the construction of the two Pontchartrain Halls following Hurricane Katrina, students lived at a dormitory known as Bienville Hall. After being used as office space while campus was being reconfigured after Katrina, the main residential section of the building finally closed down in 2010. The disused building was demolished in 2023 and the Hynes-LSUNO Charter School was built on the site.

The rear Commons of the building was not included in the deconstruction. Once the cafeteria and amenities for on campus housing, it is now home to the Facility Services Workshop, and some storage for the Engineering Building.

=== Dining services ===
The university's dining services are currently managed by Chartwells Higher Ed, a branch of Compass Group. They manage all dining locations on campus including the university's buffet-styled cafeteria is known as the Food Hall at the Galley. Retail dining locations are mainly located on the Deck (which is in the university center on the east side of campus) and the Cove (which is a building located on the west side of campus). Retail franchises include Subway, Chick Fil A, Fujisan Sushi, Bowl Life, and Brewed Awakening (which brews Starbucks Coffee). The Cove is currently under revitalization with the Sandbar reopening in Fall 2026, and various pop-ups opening from time to time. Additionally, Chartwells manages three convenience "Markets" on campus known as the Market NOLA (which is located in the university center and serves PJ's coffee), Market Cove (located in the cove), and Market Pontchartrain (located in the residence hall on campus).

== Athletics ==
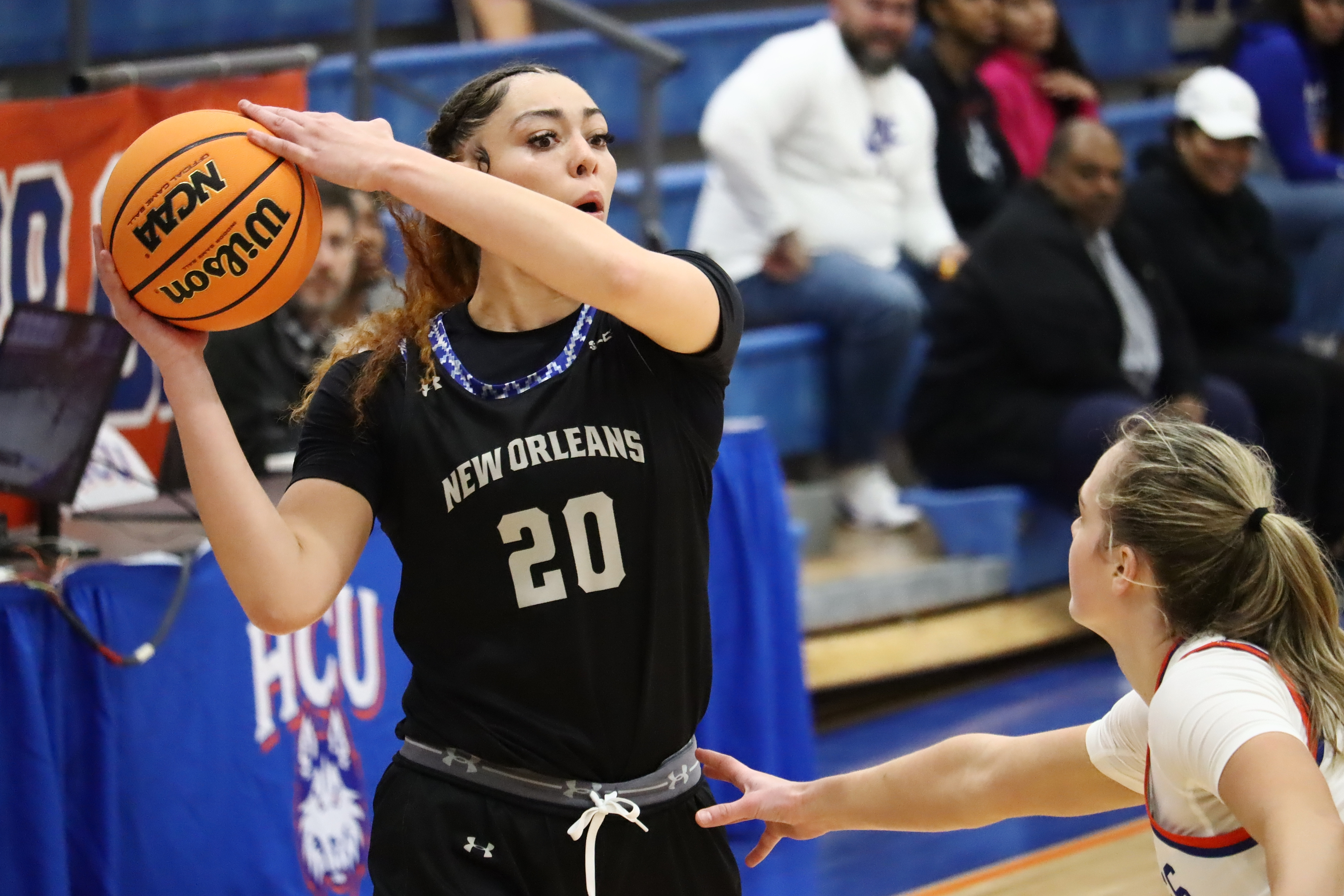
A Privateers women's basketball game in 2024. Justice Ross holds the ball.

LSU New Orleans currently has 14 varsity sports teams, and is a Division I member of the NCAA (National Collegiate Athletic Association), competing in the Southland Conference. LSUNO originally attempted to reclassify to Division II's Gulf South Conference. On February 1, 2011, Provost Joe King submitted the Division II proposal to the LSU Board of Supervisors. Previously, LSUNO competed at the Division II level from 1969 to 1975. On March 9, 2012, President Peter J. Fos announced that LSUNO plans to remain a member of NCAA Division I, with potential homes being the Sun Belt or Southland Conference. On August 21, 2012, LSUNO announced that it would be joining the Southland Conference, effective the 2013–2014 academic year.

In November 2022, students overwhelmingly voted against a fee increase to add football, women's soccer, women's golf, and marching band to the campus.

=== Sports ===
- Baseball
- Men's and women's basketball
- Men's golf
- Men's and women's cross country
- Men's and women's tennis
- Volleyball
- Men's and women's track & field
- Women's sand volleyball

=== Fight song ===
The official fight song of LSU New Orleans is "Let's Hear It For LSUNO". The song was adopted after a competition in 1981. The winner was Lois Ostrolenk. Before this, the melody from William Tell Overture was used. A variation of the overture is still played to honor this tradition.

=== Club sports ===
LSU New Orleans has many club sports provided by the Department of Recreation and Intramural Sports. Club sports are available to all LSUNO students who have an interest. Active club sports include:

- Brazilian jiu-jitsu
- Men's soccer
- Rugby
- Men's volleyball

== The Research and Technology Park (Formerly branded as "The Beach") ==
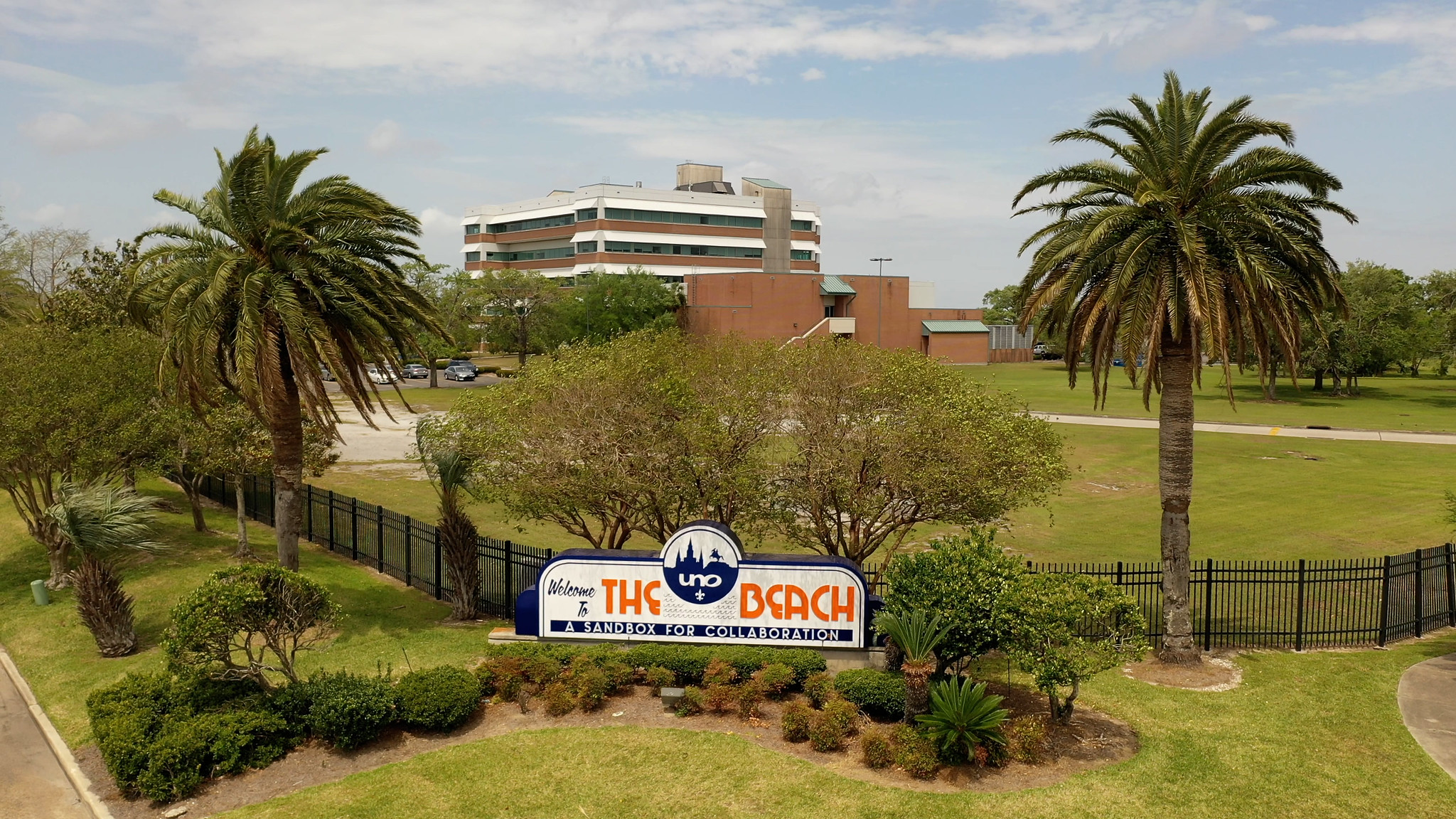
The University of New Orleans Research and Technology Park

The LSU New Orleans Research and Technology Park is a research park whose tenants collaborate with the university to conduct research, provide training, and create education opportunities. Tenants have many university services provided to them, including the university library and recreational facilities.

== Notable alumni ==
- Robin Barnes, jazz singer
- Pat Barry, UFC fighter and kickboxer
- Morris Bart, attorney
- Walter Boasso, politician
- Jericho Brown, poet, Pulitzer Prize winner
- Treva Brown, chemist
- Jim Bullinger, professional baseball player
- Randy Bush, professional baseball player
- Joel Chaisson, politician
- James H. Clark, co-founder of Silicon Graphics, Inc., and Netscape Communications
- Wayne Cooper, professional basketball player
- Ellen DeGeneres, comedian, television host, and actress
- Jim Donelon, politician
- Michael T. Dugan, educator and accounting scholar
- Margaret Evangeline, post-minimalist painter, video, performance, and installation artist
- Tom Fitzmorris, food writer
- Peter J. Fos, former president, University of New Orleans
- Eva Galler, Jewish holocaust survivor
- Jeffrey Gangwisch, filmmaker
- Robert T. Garrity Jr., politician
- Johnny Giavotella, professional baseball player
- Lee Meitzen Grue, poet and educator
- Anthony Guarisco Jr., politician
- Stephanie Hansen, lawyer and politician
- Daniel L. Haulman, aviation historian
- Ervin Johnson, professional basketball player
- Sal Khan, founder of Khan Academy
- Terry Kieffer, professional baseball player
- John Larroquette, film, television and stage actor, 5-time Emmy Award winner, Tony winner
- James Letten, former U.S. Attorney for Eastern district of Louisiana
- Nicholas Lorusso, politician
- Paul Mainieri, college baseball coach
- Valerie Martin, novelist
- Bunny Matthews, music journalist and cartoonist
- Bo McCalebb, professional basketball player
- Michelle Miller, national correspondent for CBS News
- Cynthia Hedge-Morrell, politician
- Lance E. Nichols, actor
- Mark Normand, stand-up comedian
- Frank Ocean, R&B and hip-hop artist
- Brian Palermo, actor and comedian, and science communicator
- Michael Holloway Perronne, novelist
- Gab Reisman, playwright
- Dawn Richard, singer-songwriter
- Jamison Ross, jazz drummer, vocalist and producer
- Jeffrey D. Sadow, political scientist
- Cindy Scott, jazz singer and composer and music professor
- Brian Seeger, musician, producer, composer, Coca-Cola Endowed Chair in American Jazz Studies
- Billy Slaughter, actor
- Milton Dean Slaughter, theoretical physicist
- Joe Slusarski, professional baseball player
- Brian Snitker, professional baseball manager
- Patricia Snyder, sociologist
- Julie Stokes (Class of 1992), accountant and politician
- Roy C. Strickland, businessman and politician
- Taryn Terrell, professional wrestler
- Christopher Thornton, actor
- Brian Traxler, professional baseball player
- Chloé Valdary, political activist
- Theo Von, stand-up comedian
- Wally Whitehurst, professional baseball player
- Darryl Willis, oil industry executive

== Notable faculty ==
- Lance Africk, judge
- Stephen E. Ambrose, American historian and biographer of U.S. presidents Dwight D. Eisenhower and Richard Nixon
- Fredrick Barton, novelist and film critic
- Günter Bischof, Austrian-American historian
- Amanda Boyden, novelist
- Joseph Boyden, Canadian writer
- Douglas Brinkley, American historian
- Robert Cashner, zoologist
- John Churchill Chase, cartoonist
- Richard H. Collin, American historian and food writer
- Philip B. Coulter, political scientist
- Robert Denhardt, scholar
- Philip James DeVries, biology professor
- Robert L. Flurry, chemistry professor
- Peter J. Fos, college president
- Paul Frick, psychologist
- John Gery, poet, critic, and editor
- Bruce C. Gibb, Scottish chemist
- Victor Goines, jazz musician
- Gabriel Gómez, poet
- Richard Goodman, nonfiction writer
- Arnold R. Hirsch, American historian
- Toussaint Hočevar, Slovenian-American economic historian
- Georgette Ioup, linguist
- Richard A. Johnson, artist
- Richard Katrovas, writer
- Yusef Komunyakaa, poet
- Joseph Logsdon, American historian
- Andreas Maislinger, Austrian historian
- Ellis Marsalis, Jr., jazz pianist and educator
- Valerie Martin, novelist
- Edward M. Miller, economist
- Allan R. Millett, historian
- Niyi Osundare, Nigerian writer
- Carla Penz, entomologist
- Frank Schalow, philosopher
- Milton Dean Slaughter, theoretical physicist and UNO chair emeritus
- Alan Soble, philosopher
- Nguyen TK Thanh, Vietnamese nanotechnologist
- David Wojahn, poet
