= Peter J. Fos =

American scientist and academic administrator

- Born: New Orleans, Louisiana, United States
- Education: University of New Orleans; LSU Health Sciences Center New Orleans; Tulane University
- Known for: University of New Orleans president
- Scientific career
- Fields: Health Care
- Workplaces: University of New Orleans

Peter John Fos (born 1949) was first president and sixth chief executive of the University of New Orleans (UNO) from 2012 to 2016.

Prior to accepting the presidency of UNO, Fos was provost and vice president for academic affairs at the University of Texas at Tyler.

Fos holds a baccalaureate degree in biological sciences from the University of New Orleans, a doctor of dental surgery from Louisiana State University's Health Sciences Center in New Orleans, and a doctor of philosophy in health care decision analysis from Tulane University. Prior to his presidency of UNO, he served in teaching, research, and administrative roles not only at UT-Tyler but also at Tulane, University of Southern Mississippi, and University of Nevada Las Vegas. In 2010 he was a finalist for the presidency of the University of Louisiana at Monroe. He is married to Lori Ann Lege Fos.
