= Singing caterpillars =

Bioacoustic phenomenon

Singing caterpillars is a term coined by Philip James DeVries, referring to the fact that the larvae of ant-associated butterfly species of the families Riodinidae and Lycaenidae produce substrate borne sounds that attract ants. The study of these symbiotic associations was pioneered by Phil DeVries in Central America, and Naomi Pierce in Australia. Recently, Lucas Kaminski and collaborators are expanding the studies of riodinid-ant symbioses in Brazil.

Ants that harvest plant secretions also form ecological associations with insects. Several species of such ants tend riodinid and lycaenid caterpillars, and also homopterans (aphids, plant hoppers and relatives). In doing so, ants protect them against potential predators – for example, wasps. Although both riodinid and lycaenid caterpillars attract ants and produce nutritious secretions to reward them, members of the two butterfly families have different structures to perform the same functions.

Typically, ant-associated lycaenid larvae possess a single nectary organ located on the dorsum of the seventh abdominal segment, and a pair of tentacle organs on the eight abdominal segment. Ants imbibe the secretion produced by the nectary organ, and tentacle organs function in chemical communication between caterpillars and ants. The sounds produced by lycaenid caterpillars are similar to those produced by ants, an interesting cross species convergence which facilitates caterpillar-ant communication. Lycaenid caterpillars vary tremendously in their behaviors and level of association with ants. While some species feed on plant tissues, are free-living, and attract ants to their company, others are taken inside ant nests and are fed mouth-to-mouth by ants (trophallaxis), or consume ant brood without being molested.

Ant-associated riodinids have a pair of tentacle nectary organs located dorsally on the eight abdominal segment that produce a secretion rich in sugars and amino acids. When present, anterior tentacle organs seem to release chemical signals to the ants, which in turn become very active. Some species also have balloon setae, inflated structures located on the first segment of the thorax (and projected over the head) that also seem to perform a function in chemical communication. Riodinids are known to make substrate borne sounds in two ways. While most singing riodinid caterpillars produce sound by scraping ribbed vibratory papillae against the rough surface of the head a few riodinids such as E. elvina, achieve the same effect by rubbing the cervical membrane (analogous to a neck) against the head. It has been demonstrated that caterpillars that produce calls are more successful at attracting ants than those of the same species that have been artificially "muted". Furthermore, caterpillars that are guarded by ants have increased survivorship from being effectively protected against predators.

Nymphidium leucosia caterpillar being tended by Crematogaster ants, with detail of some of the structures that evolved in the context of caterpillar-ant associations.

Ecological associations that include the production of a reward are usually interpreted as mutualistic (both partners benefit), but singing caterpillars and their associated ants do not conform to the rule. Secretion-harvesting ants form ecological associations with secretion-producing plants, and typically defend their plant resources from herbivores. However, ant-associated caterpillars successfully wedged themselves between plants and ants: they feed on plant tissue and are nonetheless protected by patrolling ants. Caterpillar secretions have been shown to be more nutritious than those produced by plants, as demonstrated in Thisbe irenea caterpillars and their and Croton host plants; – an efficient way for caterpillars to ensure ant presence and prevent harassment. However, feeding a few individual ants has no measurable benefit to the ant colony as a whole. Caterpillars are actually appropriating individual ants for their own protection, and therefore stopping such ants from performing tasks that would benefit the colony. It could therefore be argued that caterpillar-ant symbioses do not constitute a mutualism as classically defined. Riodinid and lycaenid singing caterpillars are best categorized as ranging from commensal (one partner benefits while the other is not affected) to parasitic.

== See also ==
- Bioacoustics
- Symbiosis
- Mutualism (biology)
