= Jay Baron Nicorvo =

American novelist, poet, and essayist

- Born: August 21, 1976 (age 50); Perth Amboy, New Jersey, U.S.
- Education: Eckerd College; Emerson College
- Writing career
- Genres: Novel, Poetry, Essay
- Website: nicorvo.net

Jay Baron Nicorvo (born August 21, 1976) is an American novelist, poet, and essayist.

== Life ==
Nicorvo was born in Perth Amboy, NJ and was raised in Sarasota, FL. He's married to the writer Thisbe Nissen and they live on an old farm outside Battle Creek, MI.

=== Career ===
Nicorvo's writing has appeared in Poets & Writers, The Baffler, Ploughshares, and Salon (website). His poetry has been featured on PBS NewsHour.

Nicorvo's first novel, The Standard Grand, was published in 2017 by St. Martin’s Press. It is about a group of veterans, traumatized by their wartime experiences, who meet in a crumbling resort in the Catskill Mountains.

=== Books ===
- Deadbeat: Poems. Four Way Books (2012) ISBN 978-1935536239. Deadbeat debuted on the Poetry Foundation bestseller list.
- The Standard Grand: A Novel. St. Martin's Press (2017) ISBN 978-1250108944.The Standard Grand was picked for IndieBound's Indie Next List, Library Journal's Debut Novels Great First Acts, Poets & Writers's "New and Noteworthy," and was named a best book of the year by The Brooklyn Rail.
