= Station Theatre (Urbana) =

Theatre in Urbana, Illinois, U.S.

Coordinates: 40.11481°N 88.20814°W

The Station Theatre is a small independent dramatics theatre located in downtown Urbana, Illinois. It was converted into a theatre from a Big Four Railway passenger station in 1967. At that time, it was called The Depot. The building was last used as a passenger station in 1957 for trains running east to Indianapolis and west to Peoria.

The Station Theatre was founded in 1972 and continues to produce both plays and musicals.
