= Richard Katrovas =

American writer

Richard Katrovas is the founding director of the Prague Summer Program for Writers and the author of eight books of poetry, two novels, two collections of stories and three memoirs.

== Biography ==
Born November 4, 1953, in Norfolk, Virginia, Richard Katrovas, the oldest of five children, spent his early years in cars and motels living on the highways of America while his father, a petty thief and conman, eluded state and federal authorities. His father was eventually caught, but upon being released on probation from federal prison reverted to his criminal ways, and was caught and incarcerated again. During his father's prison terms, Katrovas and his mother and siblings lived on welfare in public housing projects. Katrovas was adopted by relatives in his early teens, and lived with them for three years in Sasebo, Japan, where he earned a second-degree black belt in Shobukan Okinawa-te Karate. He graduated from high school in Coronado, California, and attended San Diego State University (B.A., English, 1977). He was then a Hoyns Fellow at the University of Virginia, attended the MFA program at the University of Arkansas, and finished his graduate work in the Iowa Writers' Workshop (MFA, 1983). Between 1970 and 1983, Katrovas taught karate and worked in numerous restaurants in San Diego, then New Orleans.

On a Fulbright fellowship, Katrovas was in Prague, Czechoslovakia in the months preceding the Velvet Revolution, and subsequently witnessed that event. The recipient of numerous grants and awards, Katrovas is the founding director of the Prague Summer Program, and is the author of seven books of poetry, Green Dragons (winner of the Wesleyan University Press New Poets Series), Snug Harbor, The Public Mirror, The Book of Complaints, and Dithyrambs, Scorpio Rising: Selected Poems; a book of short stories, Prague USA; a memoir, The Years of Smashing Bricks and The Republic of Burma Shave, and a novel, The Mystic Pig; and Prague Winter. Katrovas, as guest editor of a special double issue of the New Orleans Review, edited, and participated in much of the translation of, the first representative anthology of contemporary Czech poetry, Ten Years After the Velvet Revolution. His poems, stories, reviews and essays have appeared widely in magazines and anthologies, including Antioch Review, Contemporary Fiction, Crazyhorse, Denver Quarterly, Iowa Review, Missouri Review, New England Review, Poetry, Southern Review, Virginia Quarterly Review'; as well as Strong Measures: Contemporary American Poetry In Traditional Forms (Harper&Row), New American Poets of the 90’s (Godine), and Poets of the New Century (Godine), among many others. Katrovas's current projects are Raising Girls in Bohemia: Meditations of an American Father, a collection of essays, and Confessions of a Waiter, a novel, for which he won the William Faulkner – William Wisdom Competition in 2018.

Richard Katrovas has three daughters, Ema, Anna, and Ella. He and his family live in Kalamazoo, Michigan, New Orleans, and Prague. Katrovas taught for twenty years at the University of New Orleans and is now a professor of English at Western Michigan University.

== Publications ==
=== Books ===
- 1984: Green Dragons (Wesleyan, ISBN 0-8195-2114-0)
- 1986: Snug Harbor (Wesleyan, ISBN 0-8195-5134-1)
- 1990: The Public Mirror (Wesleyan, ISBN 0-8195-2165-5)
- 1993: The Book of Complaints (Carnegie Mellon University Press, ISBN 978-0-88748-157-4)
- 1996: Prague, USA (Portals Press, ISBN 0-916620-96-4)
- 1998: Dithyrambs: Choral Lyrics (Carnegie Mellon University Press, ISBN 0-88748-253-8)
- 2001: The Republic of Burma Shave (Carnegie Mellon University Press, ISBN 0-88748-328-3)
- 2001: Mystic Pig: A Novel of New Orleans (Smallmouth Press, ISBN 1-58848-025-9)
- 2004: Prague Winter (Carnegie Mellon University Press, ISBN 978-0-88748-405-6)
- 2007: The Years of Smashing Bricks (Carnegie Mellon University Press, ISBN 978-0-88748-468-1)
- 2008: Mystic Pig (Paperback Rerelease, Oleander Press LTD, ISBN 978-0-906672-77-8)
- 2011: Scorpio Rising: Selected Poems (Carnegie Mellon University Press, ISBN 0-88748-534-0)
- 2014: Raising Girls in Bohemia: Meditations of an American Father (Three Rooms Press, ISBN 978-1-941110-06-5)

=== Anthologies Edited ===
- 2000: The New Orleans Review: Ten Years After the Velvet Revolution
