= Alexandria, Louisiana =

- City
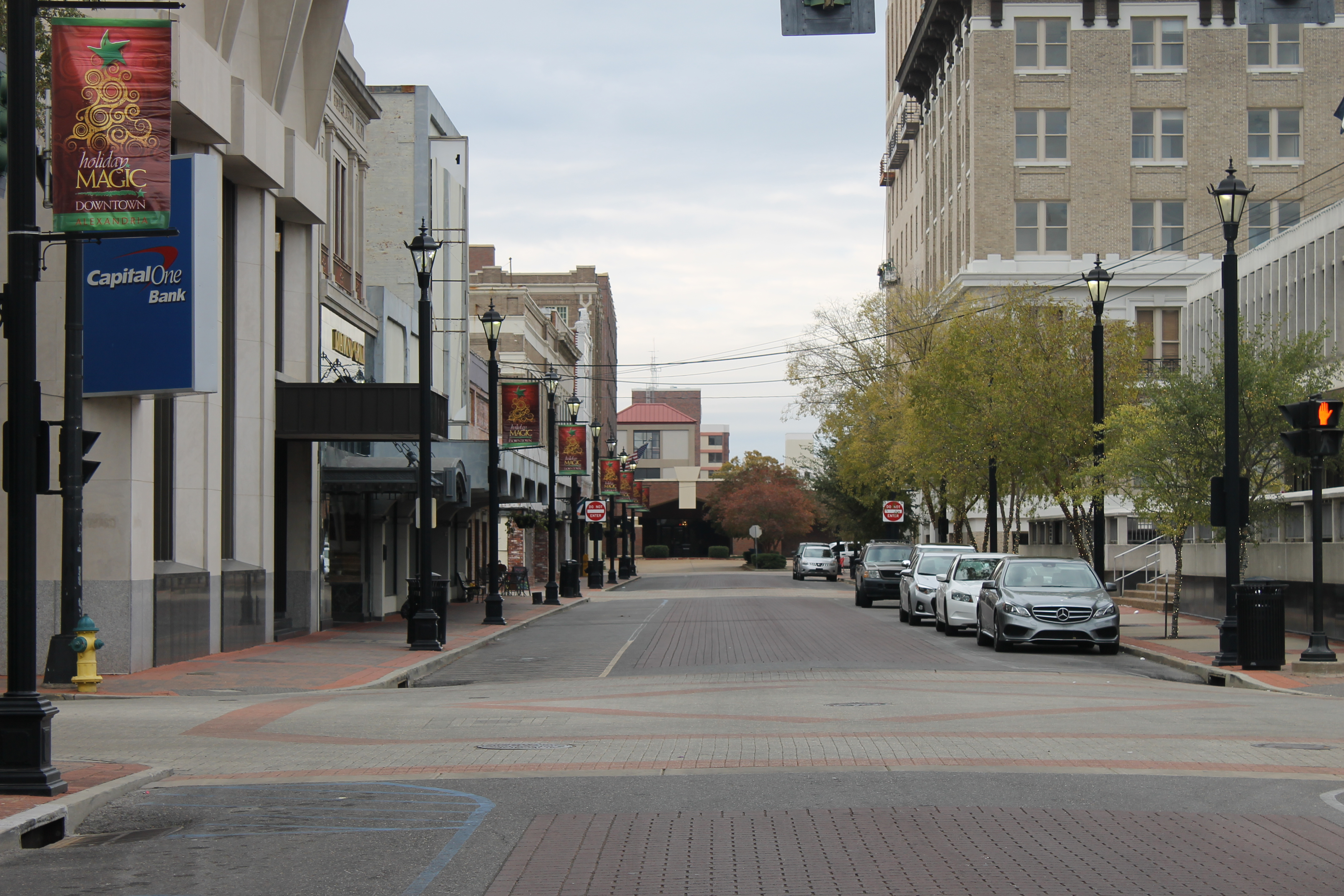
- Downtown

- Flag Seal
- Nickname: Alex (typically pronounced Ellic)
- Location of Alexandria in Rapides Parish, Louisiana.

- Location in Louisiana Location in the United States
- Coordinates: 31°18′41″N 92°26′41″W
- Country: United States
- State: Louisiana
- Parish: Rapides
- Founded: 1785 (241 years ago)
- Incorporated (town): 1818 (208 years ago)
- City Charter: 1882 (144 years ago)

Government
  - Mayor: Jacques Roy (Democratic Party)

Area
  - City: 29.18 sq mi (75.58 km^{2})
  - Land: 28.49 sq mi (73.79 km^{2})
  - Water: 0.69 sq mi (1.79 km^{2})
- Elevation: 82 ft (25 m)

Population (2020)
  - City: 45,275
  - Estimate (2024): 43,133 ▼
  - Rank: RA: 1st LA: 9th
  - Density: 1,589.1/sq mi (613.56/km^{2})
  - Metro: 153,922
- Time zone: UTC−6 (CST)
  - Summer (DST): UTC−5 (CDT)
- ZIP codes: 71301-03, 06–07, 09, 11, 15
- Area code: 318
- FIPS code: 22-00975
- GNIS feature ID: 2403079
- Website: www.cityofalexandriala.com

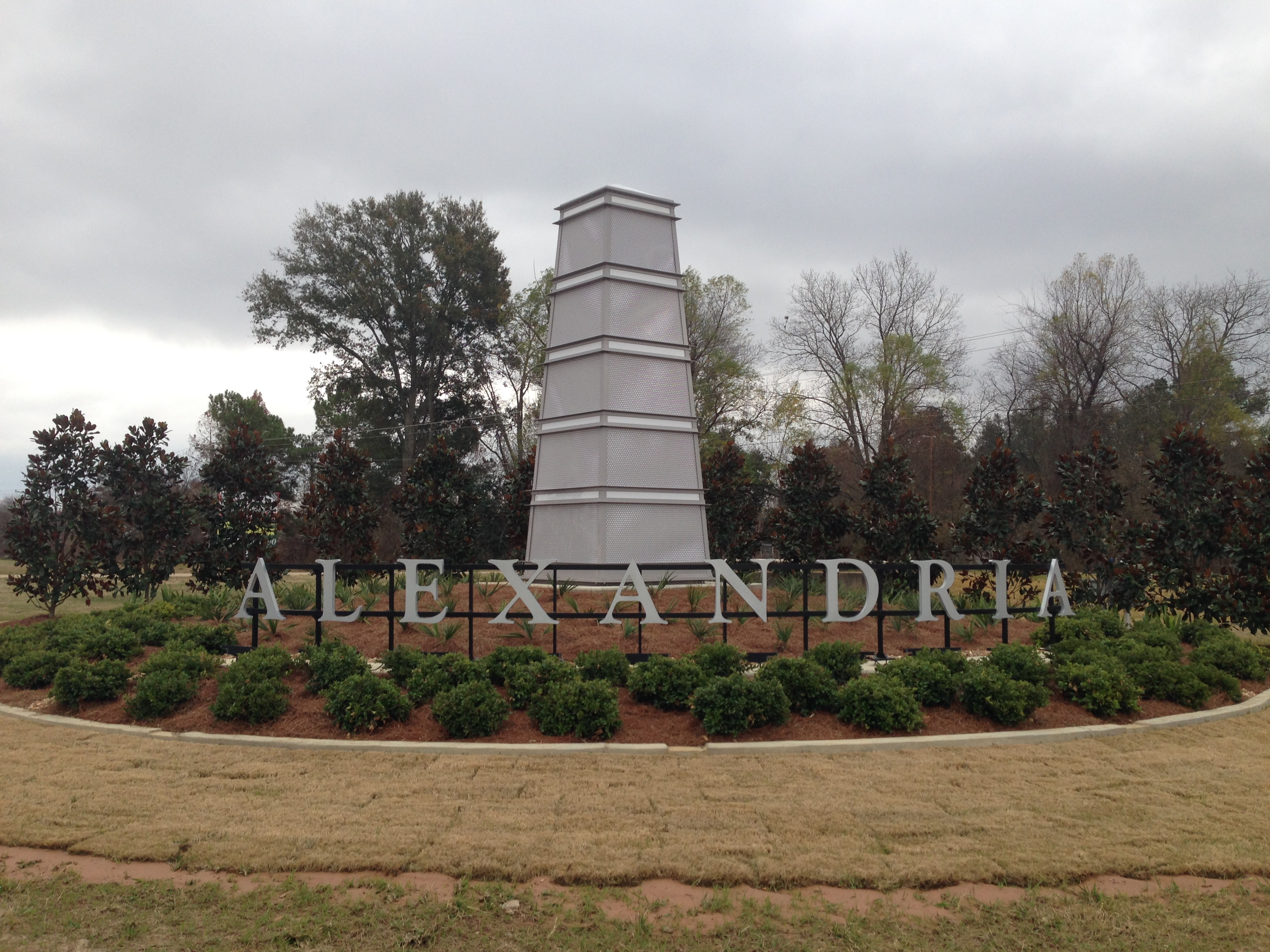
Alexandria Welcome Sign on Louisiana Highway 28 West.

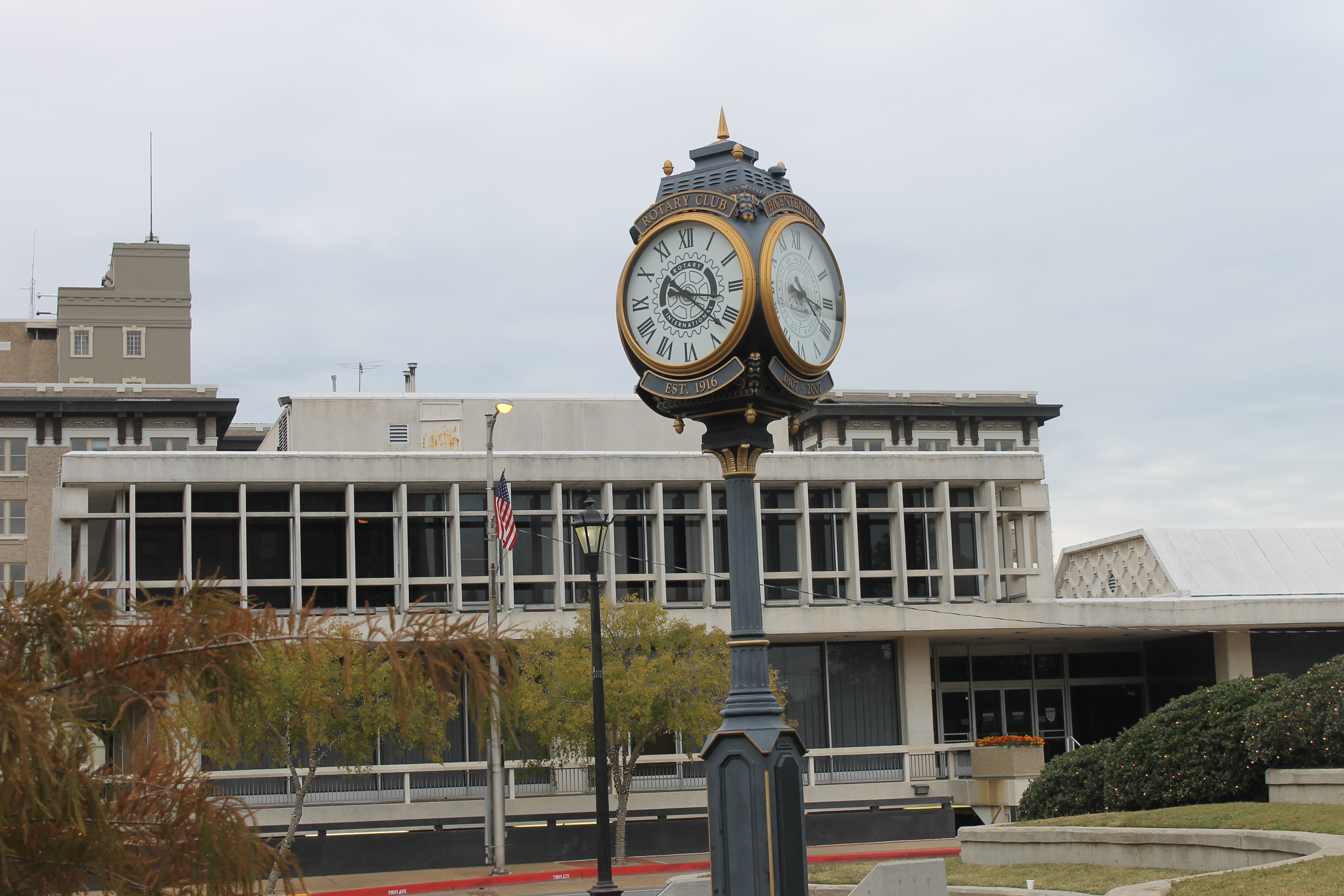
Rotary International Clock (1916), with Alexandria City Hall, constructed 1963, in the background

Alexandria is a city in the central part of the U.S. state of Louisiana. Lying on the south bank of the Red River of the South in almost the exact geographic center of the state, it is the tenth-largest city in the state, and the parish seat of and the largest city in Rapides Parish.

With a population of 45,275 in 2020, Alexandria is the principal city of the Alexandria metropolitan area, which encompasses all of Rapides and Grant parishes and has a population of 153,922. Its neighboring city is Pineville, Louisiana.

== History ==
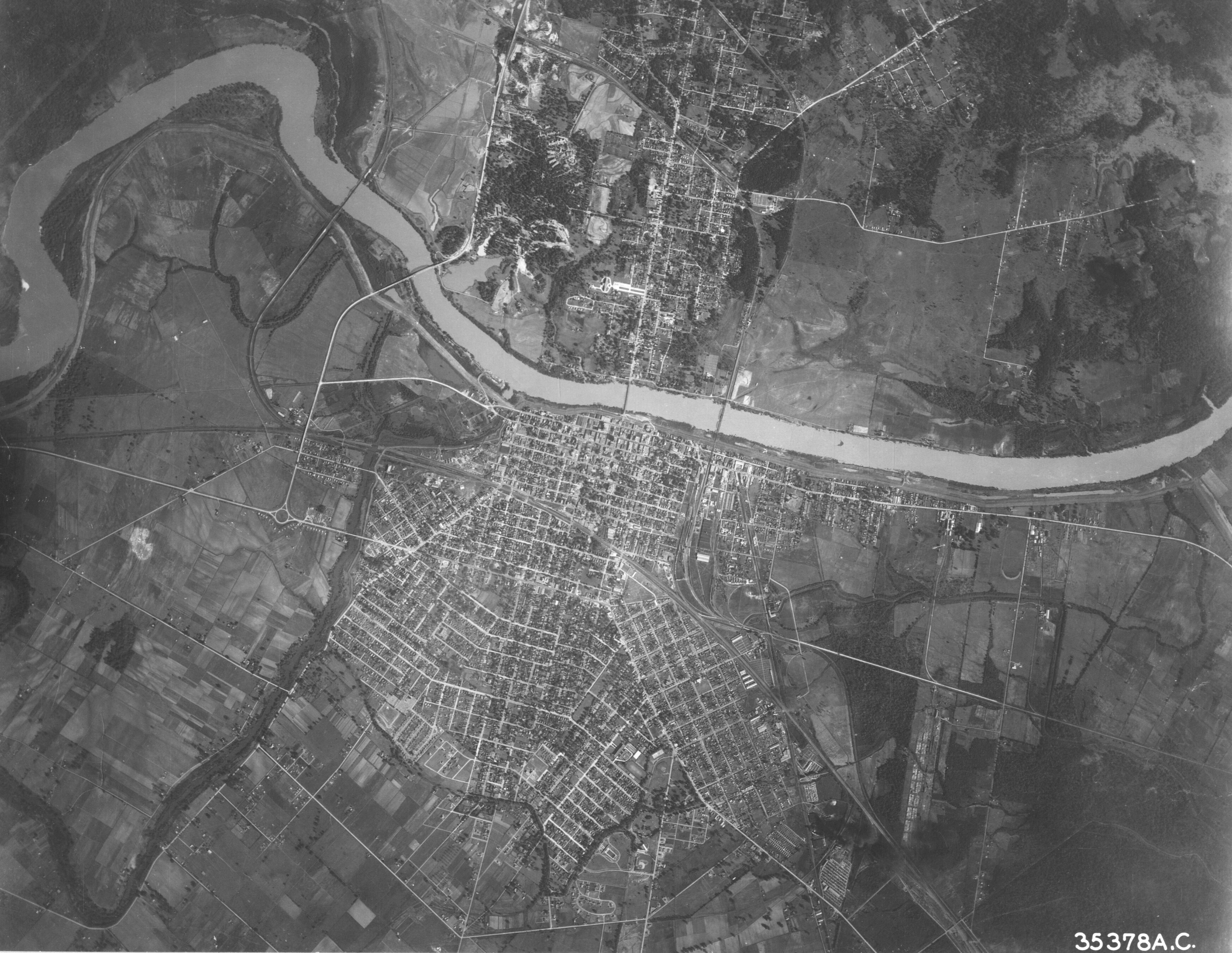
An aerial view, 1945

Located along the Red River, the city of Alexandria was originally home to a community which supported activities of the adjacent French trader outpost of Post du Rapides. The area developed as an assemblage of traders, Caddo people, and merchants in the agricultural lands bordering the mostly unsettled areas to the north and providing a link from the south to the El Camino Real and then larger settlement of Natchitoches, the oldest permanent settlement in the Louisiana Purchase.

Alexander Fulton, a businessman from Washington County, near Pittsburgh, Pennsylvania, received a land grant from Spain in 1762, and the first organized settlement was made at some point in the 1780s. In 1805, Fulton and business partner Thomas Harris Maddox laid out the town plan and named the town in Fulton's honor. The earliest deed that survives for an Alexandria resident is from June 24, 1801, when a William Cochren, who identifies himself as "Slave master of the Southern Americas", sold a tract of land across the Red River to a William Murrey.

In 1801, Fulton was appointed coroner in Rapides Parish by territorial Governor William C.C. Claiborne. Alexandria was incorporated as a town in 1818 and received a city charter in 1832.

In 1942, Alexandria was the site of the Lee Street Riot, an incident of racial violence that occurred between mostly civilians and military police. Witnesses state that as many as 20 people may have been killed, however the official report indicates that 3 soldiers were critically injured, and does not mention any deaths.

== Geography ==
According to the United States Census Bureau, the city has a total area of 27.0 square miles (69.9 km^{2}), of which 26.4 square miles (68.4 km^{2}) is land and 0.6 square mile (1.5 km^{2}) (2.15%) is water.

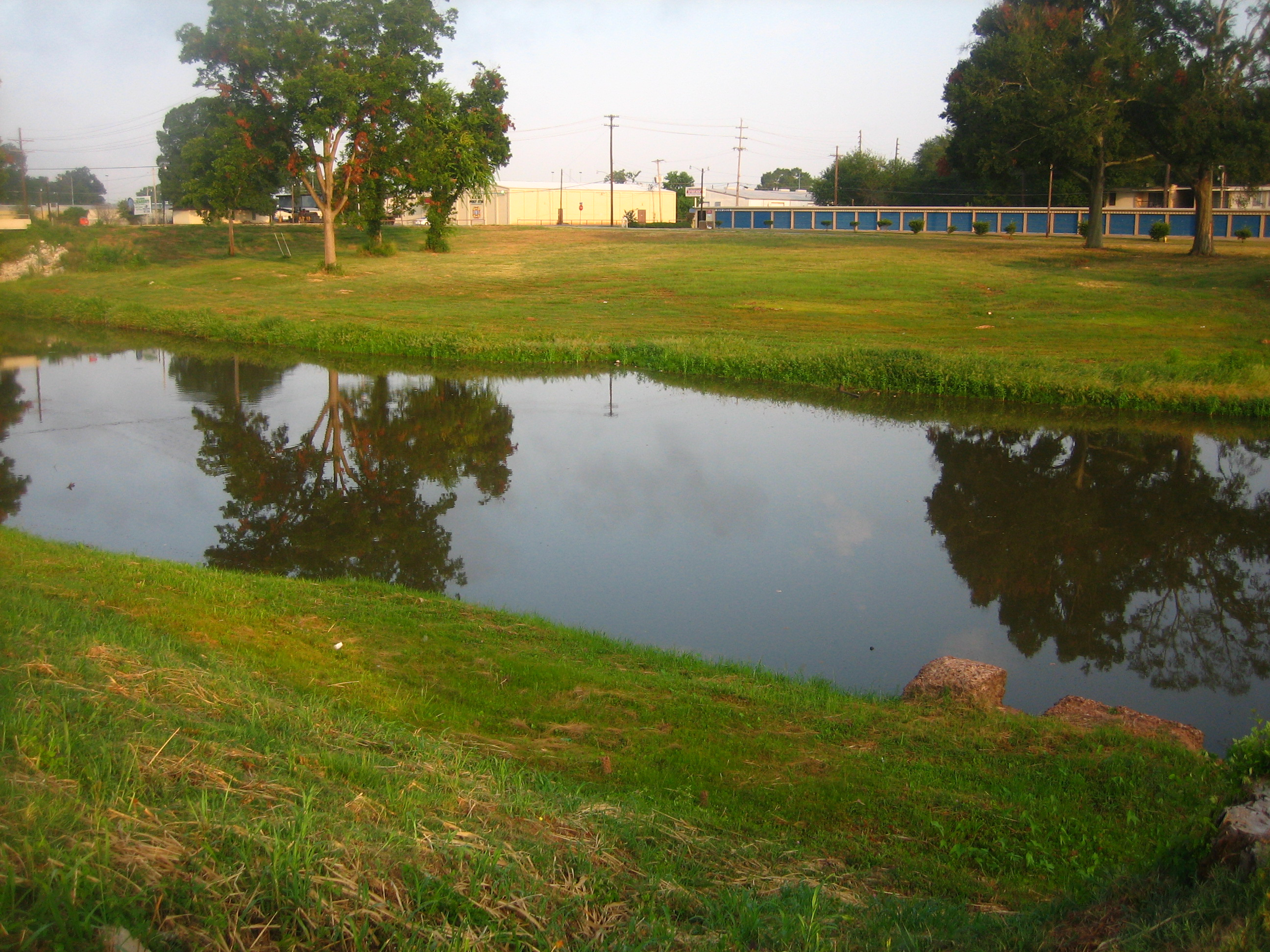
Trees are reflected in Bayou Rapides east of MacArthur Drive in Alexandria

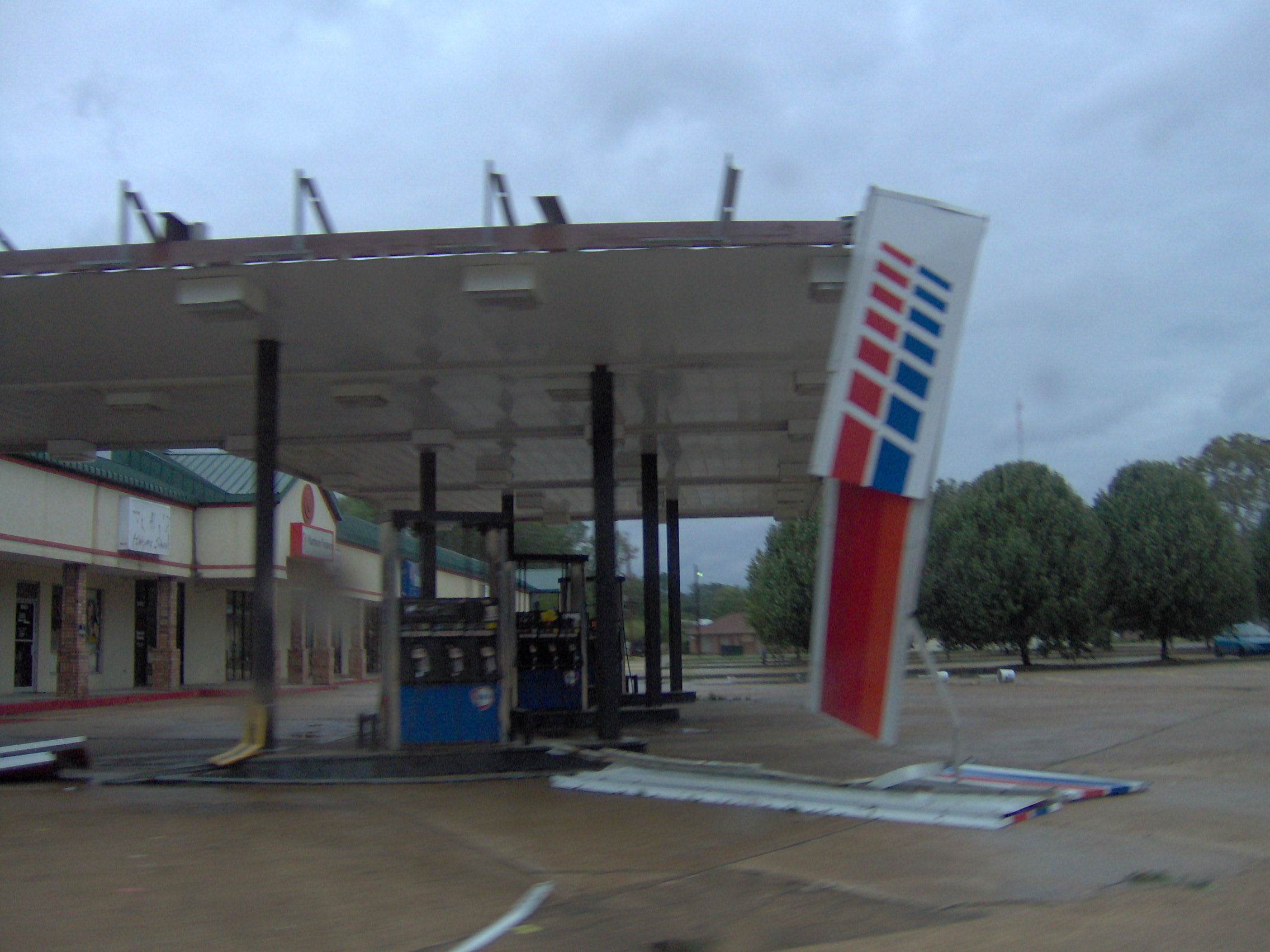
Alexandria gas station awning damaged by Hurricane Rita

Alexandria is on a level plain in the center of the Louisiana longleaf pine forests, in which pine is interspersed with various hardwoods. A number of small bayous, such as Bayou Rapides, Bayou Robert, and Hynson Bayou, meander throughout the city. In the immediate vicinity of the city, cotton, sugar, alfalfa, and garden vegetables are cultivated.

=== Climate ===
The climate is humid subtropical with some continental influence in the winter. Summers are consistently hot and humid. Winters are mild, with occasional cold snaps. On average, the first freeze occurs in early to mid November and the last freeze occurs in early to mid March. The area receives plentiful rainfall year-round, with thunderstorms possible throughout the year.

Some storms can be severe, especially during the spring months. Alexandria reports an average of 69 days per year with thunder reported, which is nearly double the national average. Snowfall is rare, with measurable snow having occurred 27 times since 1895. The heaviest snowfall event took place February 12–13, 1960, when 9.1 inches (0.25 yd) of snow fell.

Tropical storms and hurricanes affect Alexandria from time to time, but rarely cause severe damage, unlike areas closer to the coast. In September 2005, Hurricane Rita moved inland and affected Alexandria and surrounding areas, causing widespread power outages and damaging the roofs of some structures. The most recent hurricane, Gustav in 2008, caused widespread flooding, knocked over trees and power lines leading to power outages, and damaged structures. Some low-lying Alexandria neighborhoods had substantial flooding from Gustav, leaving several feet of water in houses.

Climate data for Alexandria, Louisiana (1991–2020 normals, extremes 1892–present)
Month	Jan	Feb	Mar	Apr	May	Jun	Jul	Aug	Sep	Oct	Nov	Dec	Year
Record high °F (°C)	87 (31)	88 (31)	93 (34)	98 (37)	99 (37)	106 (41)	109 (43)	110 (43)	109 (43)	98 (37)	89 (32)	85 (29)	110 (43)
Mean maximum °F (°C)	75.9 (24.4)	78.9 (26.1)	83.7 (28.7)	86.9 (30.5)	91.9 (33.3)	96.4 (35.8)	98.9 (37.2)	99.6 (37.6)	96.8 (36.0)	90.6 (32.6)	83.4 (28.6)	78.4 (25.8)	100.6 (38.1)
Mean daily maximum °F (°C)	58.5 (14.7)	62.6 (17.0)	69.6 (20.9)	76.3 (24.6)	83.3 (28.5)	89.3 (31.8)	91.7 (33.2)	92.4 (33.6)	88.1 (31.2)	79.0 (26.1)	68.2 (20.1)	60.5 (15.8)	76.6 (24.8)
Daily mean °F (°C)	48.5 (9.2)	52.2 (11.2)	59.2 (15.1)	65.8 (18.8)	73.8 (23.2)	80.2 (26.8)	82.6 (28.1)	82.7 (28.2)	78.1 (25.6)	67.8 (19.9)	57.3 (14.1)	50.5 (10.3)	66.6 (19.2)
Mean daily minimum °F (°C)	38.5 (3.6)	41.8 (5.4)	48.8 (9.3)	55.4 (13.0)	64.3 (17.9)	71.0 (21.7)	73.6 (23.1)	73.1 (22.8)	68.0 (20.0)	56.6 (13.7)	46.4 (8.0)	40.4 (4.7)	56.5 (13.6)
Mean minimum °F (°C)	24.5 (−4.2)	28.9 (−1.7)	33.0 (0.6)	41.5 (5.3)	52.3 (11.3)	63.2 (17.3)	69.0 (20.6)	67.2 (19.6)	55.5 (13.1)	41.6 (5.3)	31.8 (−0.1)	27.0 (−2.8)	21.9 (−5.6)
Record low °F (°C)	4 (−16)	3 (−16)	22 (−6)	31 (−1)	38 (3)	50 (10)	57 (14)	55 (13)	40 (4)	27 (−3)	20 (−7)	7 (−14)	3 (−16)
Average precipitation inches (mm)	6.13 (156)	5.13 (130)	5.18 (132)	5.44 (138)	4.58 (116)	5.29 (134)	4.55 (116)	4.30 (109)	3.98 (101)	4.89 (124)	5.45 (138)	5.98 (152)	60.90 (1,547)
Average snowfall inches (cm)	0.0 (0.0)	0.1 (0.25)	0.0 (0.0)	0.0 (0.0)	0.0 (0.0)	0.0 (0.0)	0.0 (0.0)	0.0 (0.0)	0.0 (0.0)	0.0 (0.0)	0.3 (0.76)	0.0 (0.0)	0.4 (1.0)
Average precipitation days (≥ 0.01 in)	9.4	8.4	8.0	6.6	7.2	9.4	8.7	8.2	6.3	6.0	6.9	8.8	93.9
Source: NOAA

== Demographics ==
Historical population
Census	Pop.	Note	%±
1840	814		—
1850	672		−17.4%
1860	1,461		117.4%
1870	1,218		−16.6%
1880	1,800		47.8%
1890	2,861		58.9%
1900	5,648		97.4%
1910	11,213		98.5%
1920	17,510		56.2%
1930	23,025		31.5%
1940	27,066		17.6%
1950	34,913		29.0%
1960	40,279		15.4%
1970	41,811		3.8%
1980	51,648		23.5%
1990	49,188		−4.8%
2000	46,342		−5.8%
2010	47,723		3.0%
2020	45,275		−5.1%
2025 (est.)	42,938	▼	−5.2%
U.S. Decennial Census

=== 2020 census ===
Alexandria city, Louisiana – Racial and ethnic composition Note: the US Census treats Hispanic/Latino as an ethnic category. This table excludes Latinos from the racial categories and assigns them to a separate category. Hispanics/Latinos may be of any race.
Race / Ethnicity (NH = Non-Hispanic)	Pop 2000	Pop 2010	Pop 2020	% 2000	% 2010	% 2020
White alone (NH)	19,486	17,872	16,537	42.05%	37.45%	36.53%
Black or African American alone (NH)	25,291	27,210	24,745	54.57%	57.02%	54.65%
Native American or Alaska Native alone (NH)	112	171	156	0.24%	0.36%	0.34%
Asian alone (NH)	567	872	977	1.22%	1.83%	2.16%
Native Hawaiian or Pacific Islander alone (NH)	15	4	14	0.03%	0.01%	0.03%
Other race alone (NH)	36	75	162	0.08%	0.16%	0.36%
Mixed race or Multiracial (NH)	379	670	1,409	0.82%	1.40%	3.11%
Hispanic or Latino (any race)	456	849	1,275	0.98%	1.78%	2.82%
Total	46,342	47,723	45,275	100.00%	100.00%	100.00%

In the 2020 United States census, there were 45,275 people, 17,920 households, and 10,933 families residing in the city.

=== 2010 census ===
In the 2010 census, there were 47,723 people, 17,816 households, and 11,722 families residing in the city. The population density was 1,754.6/sq mi (677.5/km^{2}). There were 19,806 housing units at an average density of 749.9 per square mile (289.5/km^{2}). The racial makeup of the city was 38.32% White, 57.25% Black, 1.25% Native American, 1.85% Asian, 0.14% Pacific Islander, 1.03% from other races, and 1.09% from two or more races. 6.98% of the population were Hispanic or Latino of any race.

There were 17,816 households, out of which 31.9% had children under the age of 18 living with them, 38.5% were married couples living together, 23.2% had a female householder with no husband present, and 34.2% were non-families. 30.4% of all households were made up of individuals, and 12.1% had someone living alone who was 65 years of age or older. The average household size was 2.50 and the average family size was 3.13.

28.1% of the population were under the age of 18, 9.2% from 18 to 24, 26.2% from 25 to 44, 21.4% from 45 to 64, and 15.1% who were 65 years of age or older. The median age was 36 years. For every 100 females, there were 83.5 males. For every 100 females age 18 and over, there were 77.7 males.

The median income for a household in the city was $26,097, and the median income for a family was $31,978. Males had a median income of $29,456 versus $20,154 for females. The per capita income for the city was $16,242. About 23.2% of families and 27.4% of the population were below the poverty line, including 37.7% of those under age 18 and 18.5% of those age 65 or over.

== Religion ==
Like many other southern cities, the largest single church denomination in the Alexandria area is Southern Baptist. Large congregations include the Emmanuel Baptist Church and Calvary Baptist Church. Alexandria is the headquarters of the Louisiana Baptist Convention. Alexandria also has a significant number of Methodists, Presbyterians, Episcopalians, and Pentecostals.

A significant Catholic population is also present, a result of the large Catholic Acadian French population which resides in and around Alexandria, many from neighboring Avoyelles Parish. Alexandria is the headquarters for the Diocese of Alexandria.

Alexandria has a small, though active Jewish community which dates back to the mid-19th century. Jews have held positions in local government, civic organizations, education, and medicine. At one time, many large businesses in the downtown were Jewish-owned. The Jewish community in Alexandria maintains two synagogues, which are approximately two blocks apart: Congregation Gemiluth Chassodim (Reform) and B'nai Israel Traditional Synagogue (Conservative).

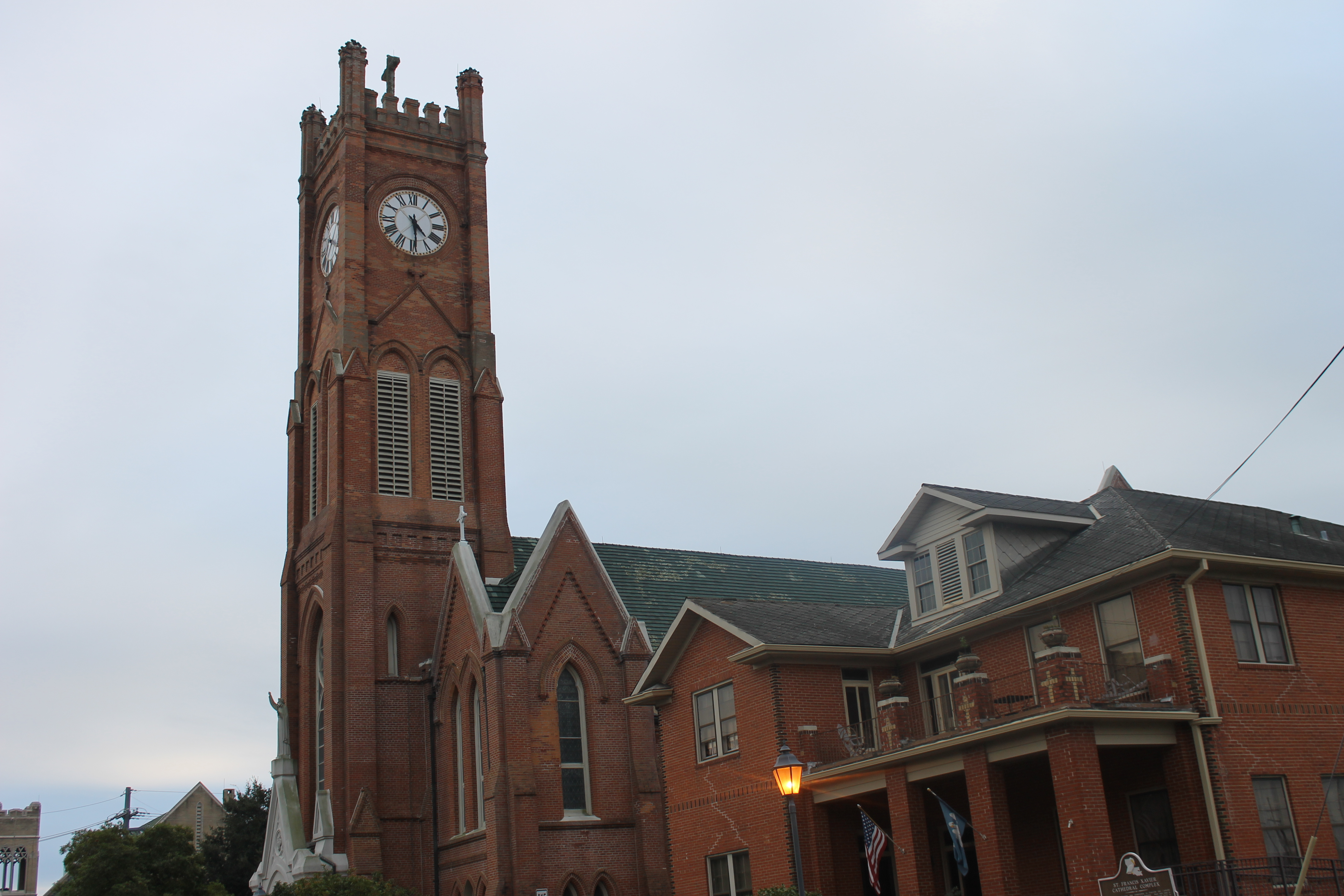
St. Francis Xavier Cathedral in downtown Alexandria

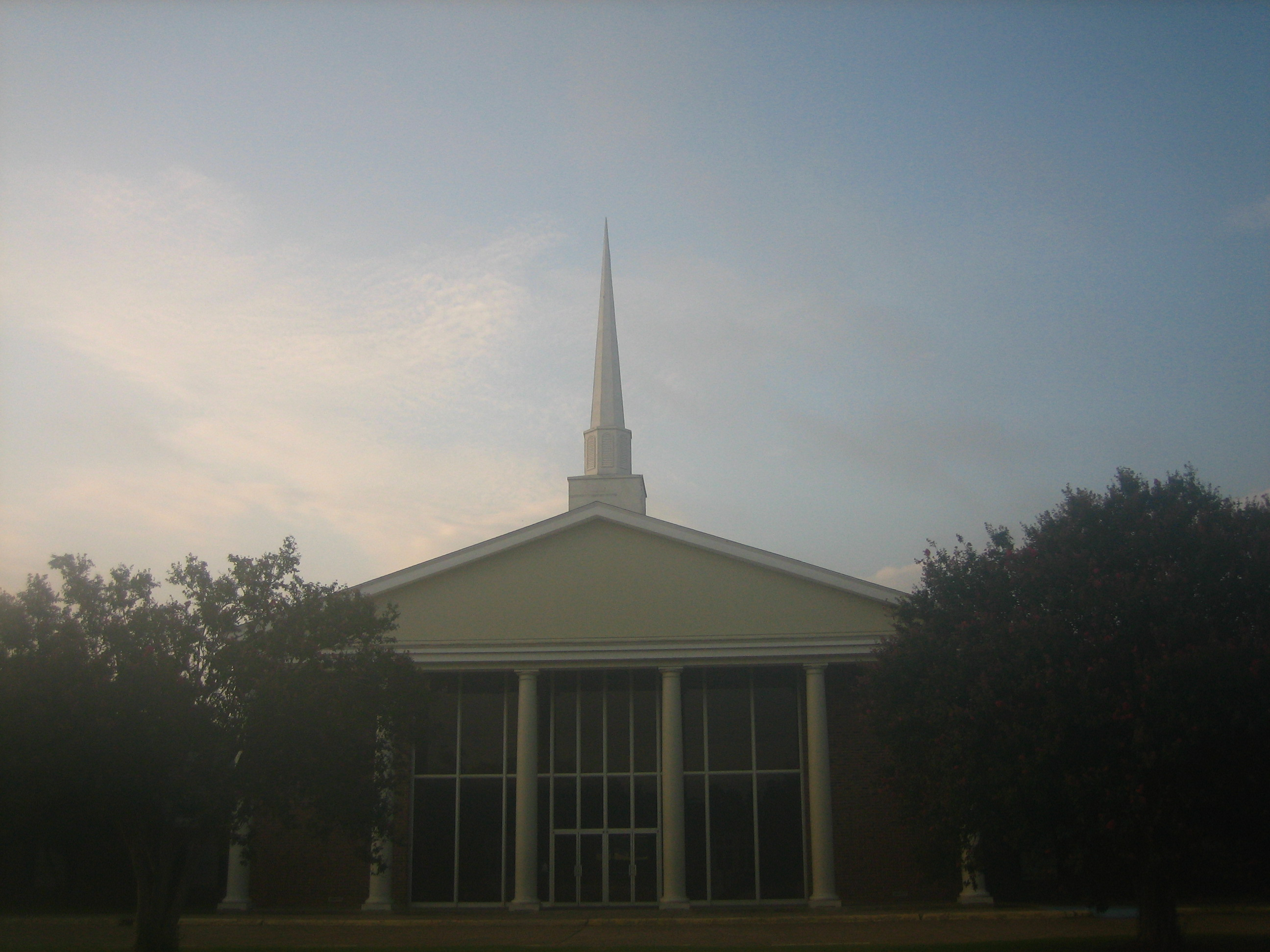
Sanctuary of Pentecostal Church in Alexandria

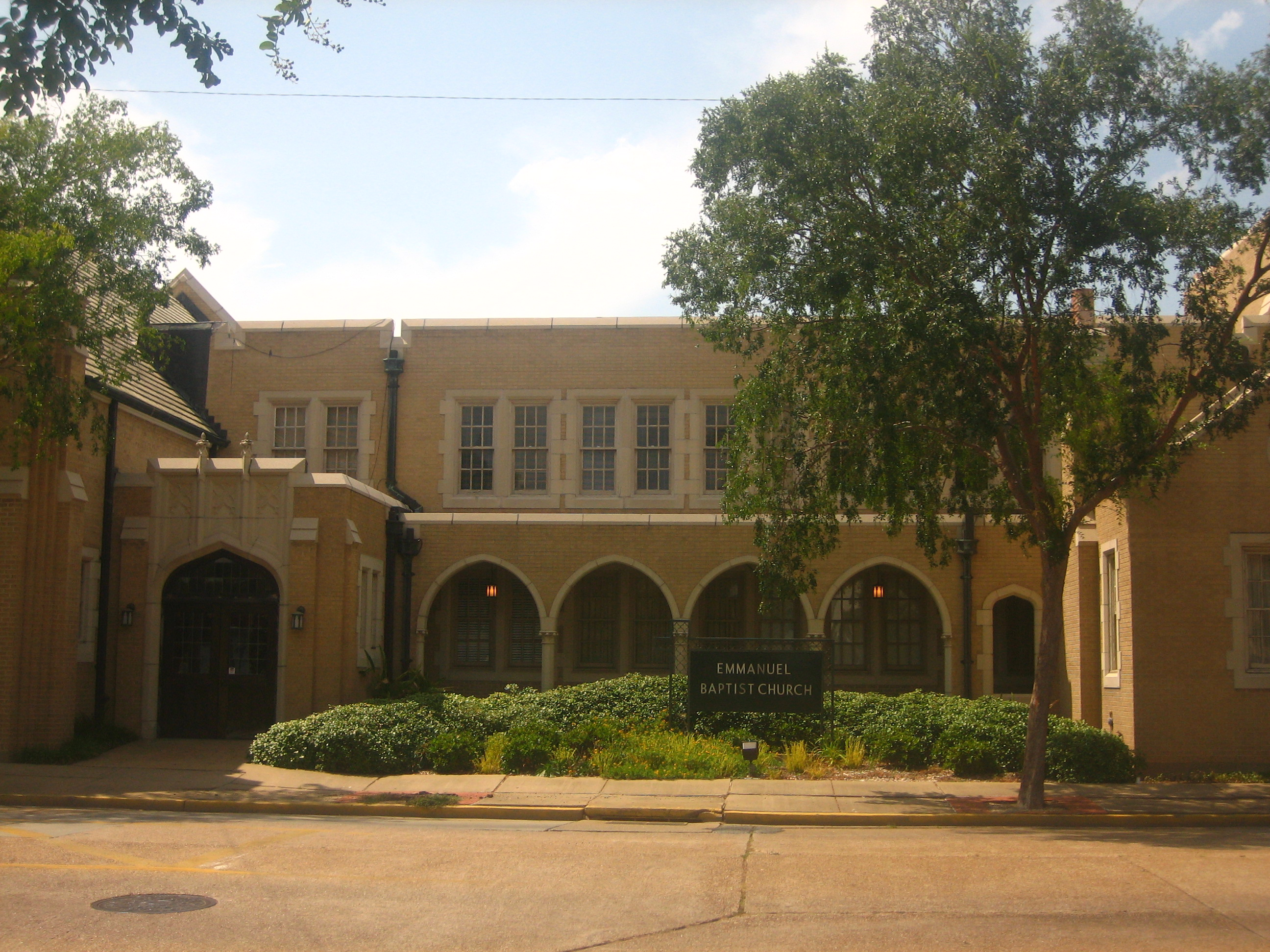
Emmanuel Baptist Church on Jackson Street in downtown Alexandria

== Annual cultural events and festivals ==
=== Mardi Gras ===
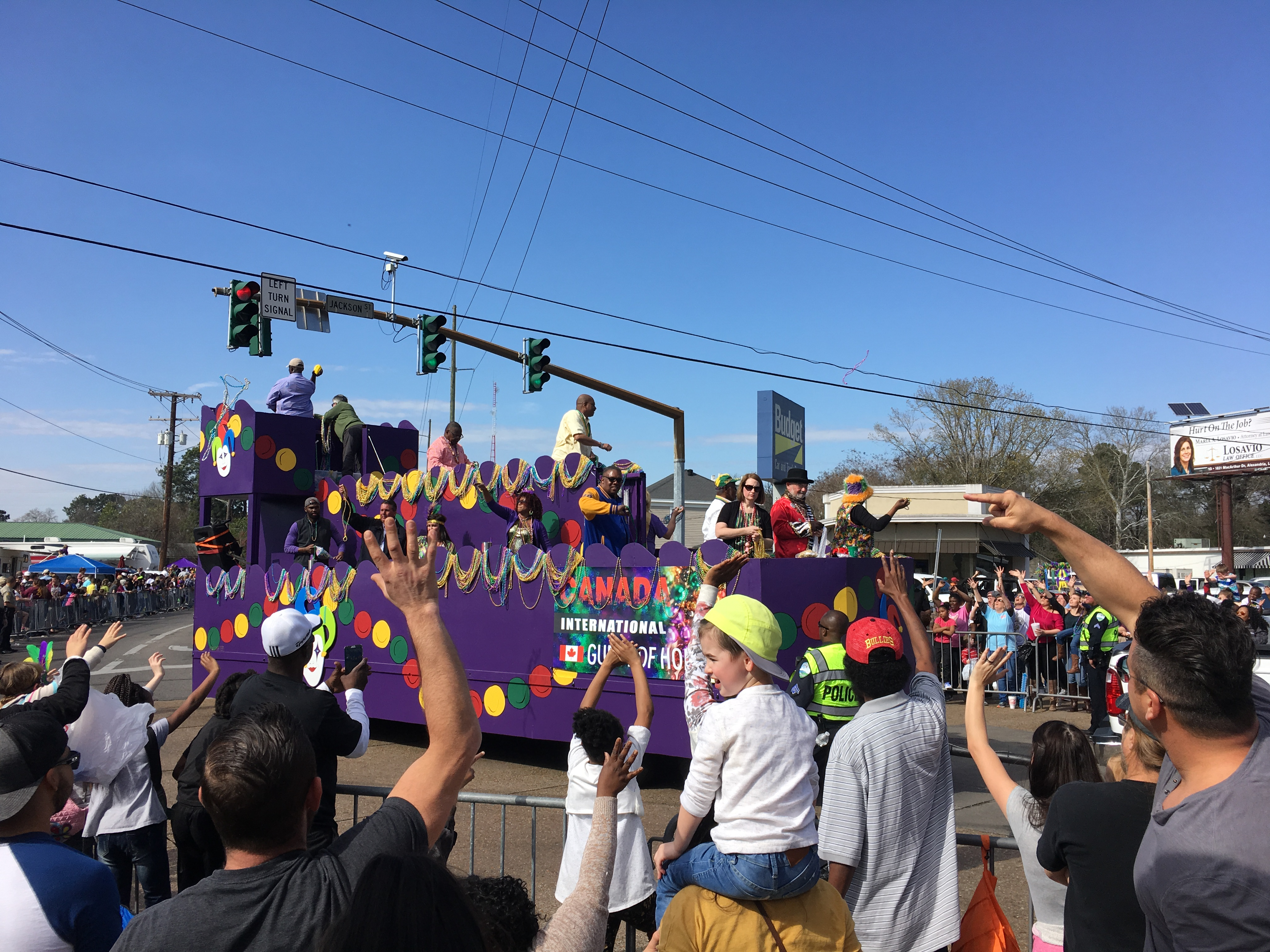
Mardi Gras float in the AMGA Krewes Parade in Alexandria.

Though Alexandria is north of the Cajun cultural area, the city recognizes Mardi Gras as an official holiday. The annual Mardi Gras Krewes Parade – occurring on the Sunday before Mardi Gras – on Texas Avenue is a major cultural festivity in the area. It is featured as a family-oriented event, and parade goers can enjoy over 20 New Orleans style floats, high school and college marching bands, as well as appearances by local celebrities. In addition to the main Sunday parade, the College Cheerleaders & Classic Cars Parade, which was established in 2008, takes place downtown on the Friday before Mardi Gras, the Children's Parade takes place downtown on the Saturday before Mardi Gras, and the Krewe of Provine Parade is held on Fat Tuesday, processing along Coliseum Boulevard. All the events are organized by the Alexandria Mardi Gras Association (AMGA). The Krewe Parade can attract from 120,000 to 150,000; the Children's parade, up to 40,000 to 50,000, and the College Cheerleaders & Classic Cars, about 5,000 to 15,000 people.

=== Alex River Fête ===
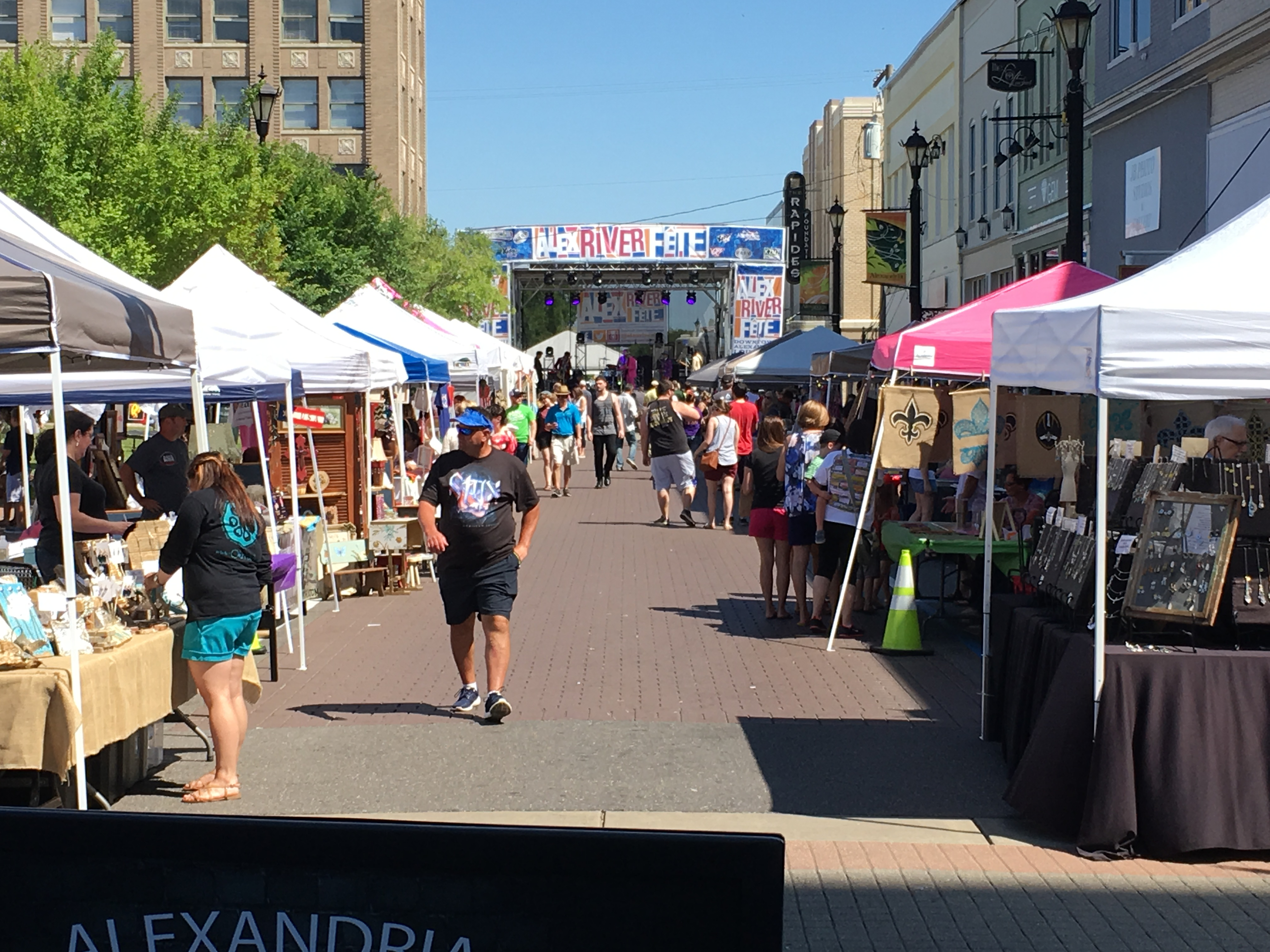
Booth venues at the annual Alex River Fête in downtown Alexandria.

An annual three-day festival is held in downtown Alexandria around late April and early May. The festival, established in 2013, was created around a former successful stand-alone event, the Louisiana Dragon Boat Races. It features the race and other former stand-alone events such as Dinner on the Bricks and the ArtWalk (now Art Fête) along with various booth venues, food, and live music, as well as the Kids Fête and Classic Car Fête.

=== Alex Winter Fête ===
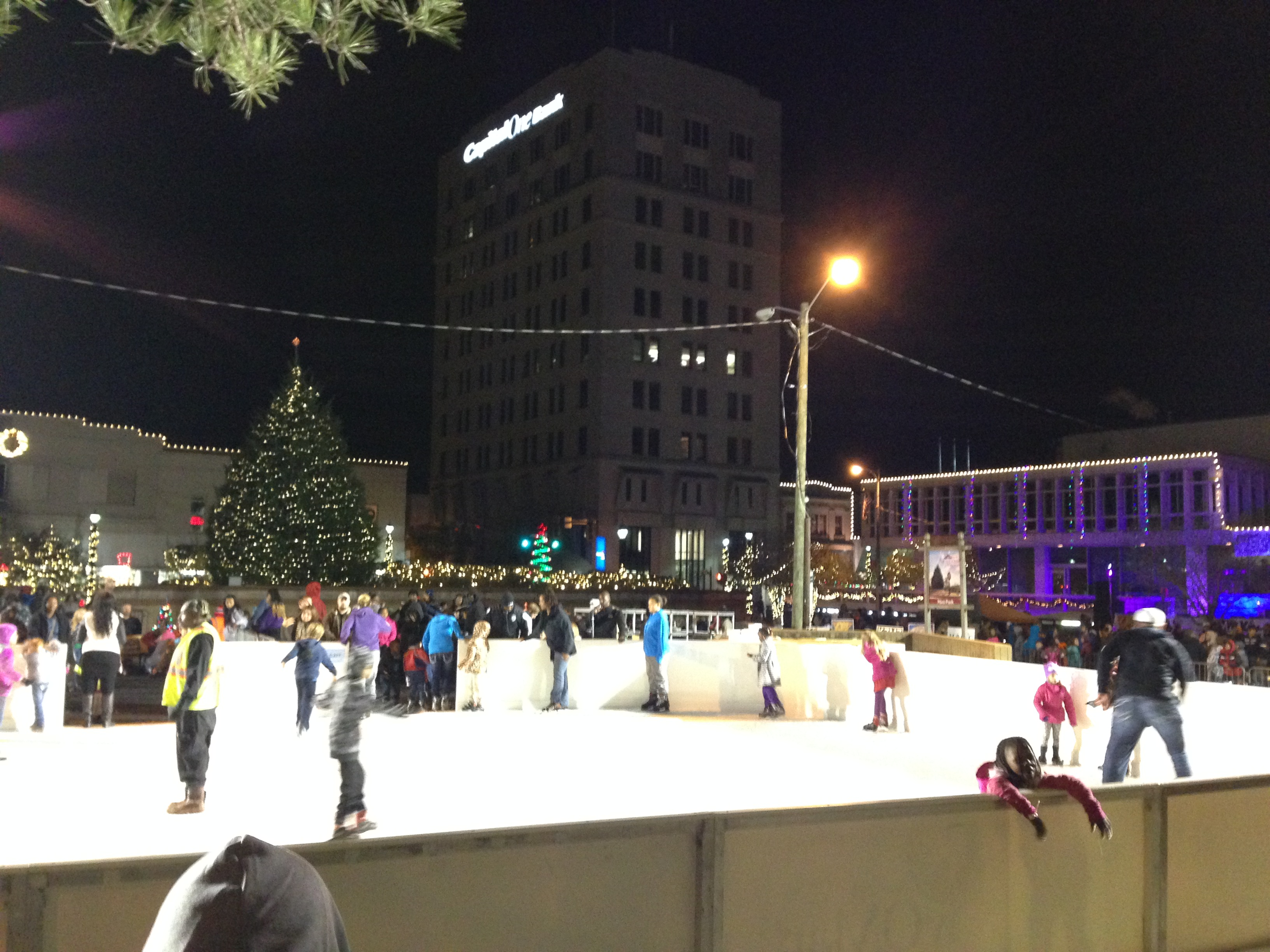
Ice rink at the annual Alex Winter Fête in downtown Alexandria.

An annual three day festival held in downtown Alexandria around early December. Launched in 2015, the festival first year drew about double the anticipated crowd of 15,000. The festival, like the Alex River Fête, feature booth venues, food, and live music but also features an ice rink. In January 2017, the Alex Winter Fête was voted Festival of the Year by the Louisiana Travel Promotion Association.

=== Former events ===
==== Cenlabration ====
Begun in the late 1980s, Cenlabration was one of the largest festivals in Central Louisiana (Cenla). The name comes from Central Louisiana ("LA") Celebration, and reflects local culture and heritage, as well as serving as a means of celebrating Labor Day as the end of summer.

As many as three stages support a particular type of music, including Cajun and zydeco, blues and jazz, and Country music. In addition there are arts and crafts booths for local artists to sell their wares. In the Children's Village, children can participate in arts and crafts, listen to storytellers, play games with clowns, or watch a play. The festival has plenty of carnival rides available as well. Cenlabration ends with a large fireworks display.

The festival ran for 20 years until cancellation due to finances. The city ended its annual support of $40,000 because of budget constraints.

==== RiverFest ====
In 2002, representatives of local government, businesses, organizations, and community formed the nonprofit organization River Cities Cultural Alliance, Inc. to promote tourism and the arts through a celebration of Central Louisiana's diverse cultural heritage. The nonprofit served to organize and put on RiverFest: Heritage and Arts on the Red. More than ten thousand festival-goers attending the event.

RiverFest was held in downtown Alexandria and on the Alexandria and Pineville levees. The festival features the work of visual artists from across the South, food booths exemplifying southern cuisine, a variety of children's activities, three outdoor stages with a wide range of music, dance, and theatrical performances, and a literary component with readings and panel discussions by Louisiana authors and scholars.

RiverFest was canceled in 2007.

==== Que'in on the Red ====
An annual barbecue festival launched in 2006, the festival was held on the levee near downtown Alexandria and was well known for its big-name entertainment. The event was cancelled in 2012 due to its high cost and the city deciding against continued support of $100,000 annually.

== Museums ==
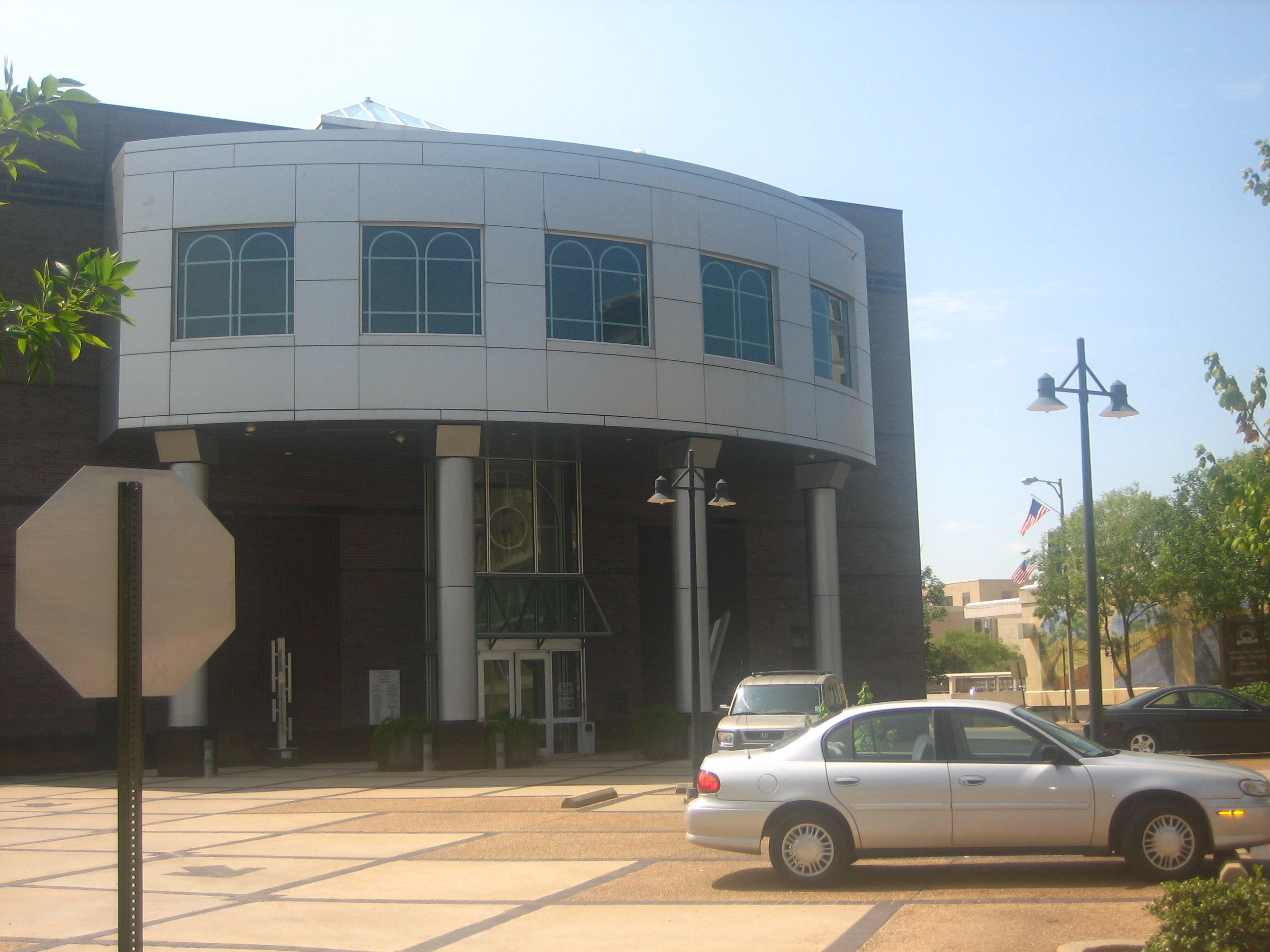
The Alexandria Museum of Art is located downtown along the Red River.

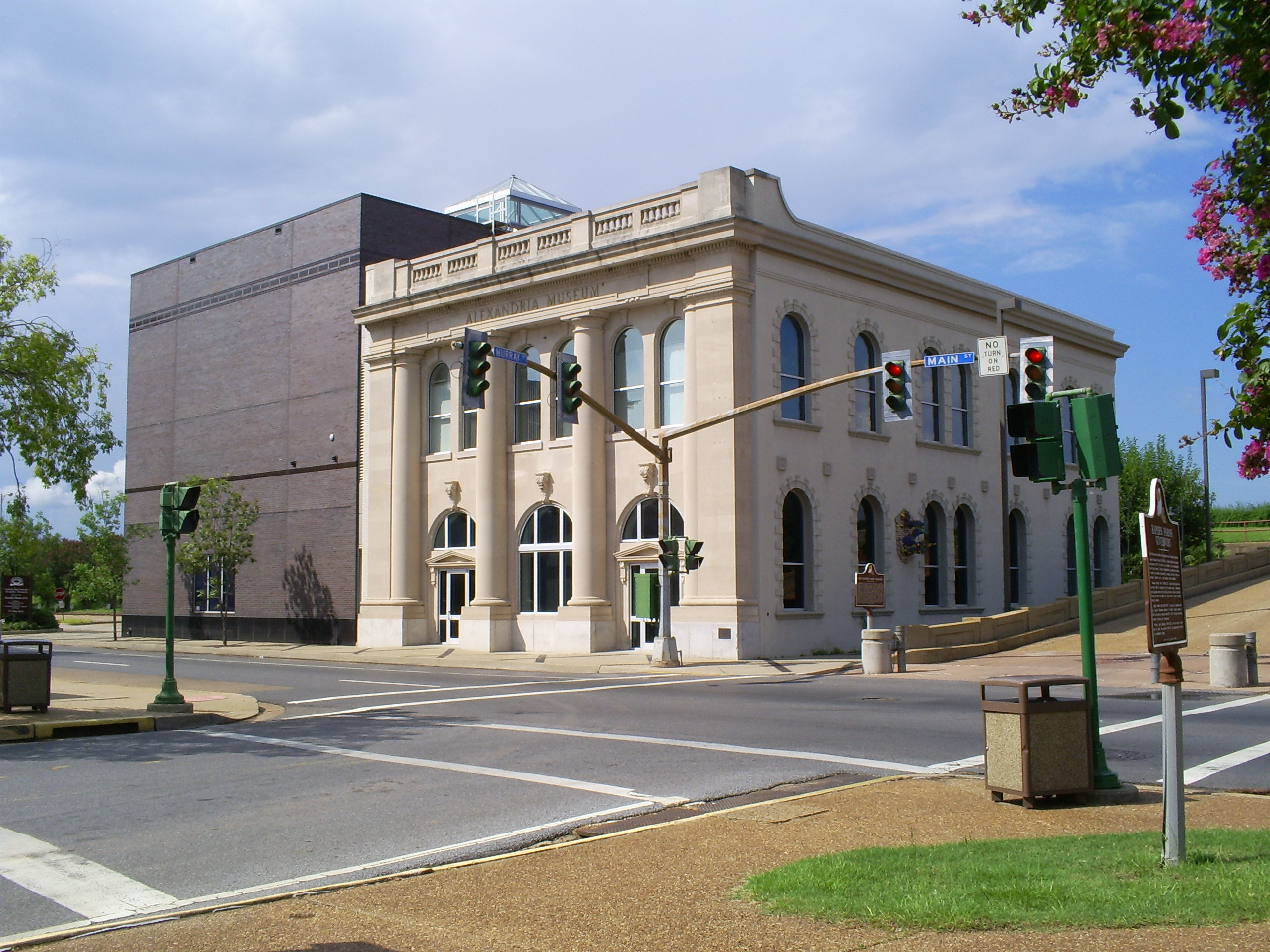
An historic former Rapides Bank and Trust Company building houses part of the Alexandria Museum of Art to the left in photo.

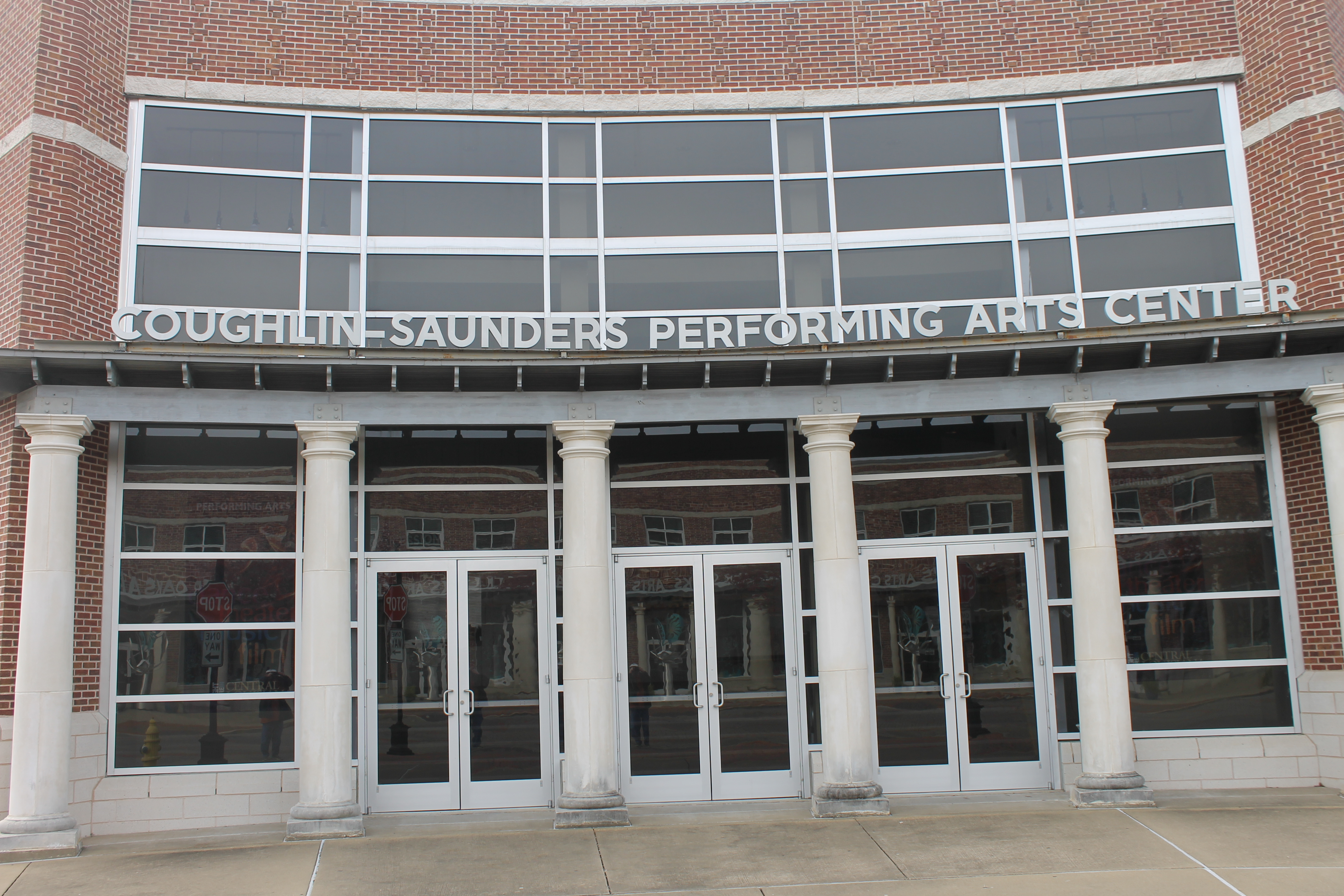
The 615-seat Coughlin-Saunders Performing Arts Center is located on Third Street across from the Alexandria Daily Town Talk building

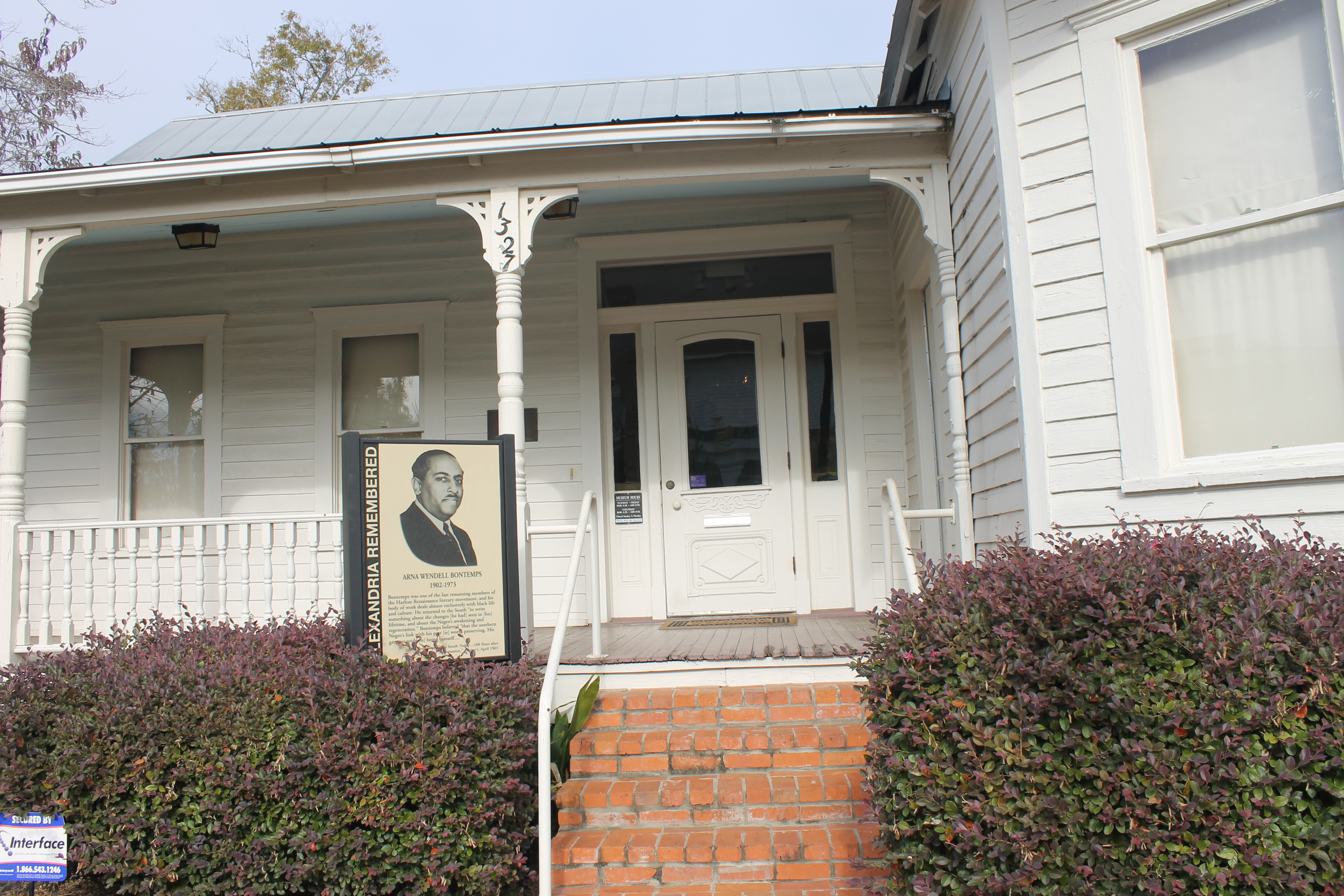
Arna Bontemps African American Museum in downtown Alexandria

The Alexandria Museum of Art was founded in 1977 and occupies an historic Rapides Bank Building on the banks of the Red River. The building was built c. 1898 and is listed on the National Register of Historic Places. The museum opened to the public in March 1998. In 1998, the Alexandria Museum of Art expanded and constructed its grand foyer and offices as an annex to the Rapides Bank Building.

In 1999, the Alexandria Museum of Art was honored as an Outstanding Arts Organization in the Louisiana Governor's Arts Awards. In 2007, the Alexandria Museum of Art entered into a collaborative endeavor agreement with Louisiana State University of Alexandria (LSUA). The Alexandria Museum of Art now also serves as a downtown campus for LSUA classes, and is host to multidisciplinary community events, including concerts and recitals, lectures, yoga classes, Second Saturday Markets, and Museum Afterhours.

The Louisiana History Museum is located downtown on the bottom floor of the former library. A small facility, it showcases the history of all Louisiana, with emphasis on the central portion of the state, Rapides Parish, and Alexandria. Major exhibit areas concern Native Americans, Louisiana geography, politics, health care, farming, and the impact of war.

The T.R.E.E. House Children's Museum and Arna Bontemps African American Museum are located within the Cultural Arts District.

The Kent Plantation House in Alexandria, completed by 1800, was located on a Spanish land grant. It is the oldest standing structure in Central Louisiana, one of only two buildings in the city to survive the burning of 1864 by Union troops fleeing after having been defeated at the Battle of Mansfield in DeSoto Parish. The house has been moved from its original location but is still located on part of the first land grant. It is open for tours daily except Sundays at 9, 10, and 11 a.m. and 1, 2, and 3 p.m. The tour is led by costumed docents and includes the house furnished in period pieces, some belonging to the original family, and all nine outbuildings, including an 1840-50s sugar mill, blacksmith shop, barn, two slave cabins, open-hearth kitchen, and milk house.

== Performing arts ==
The performing arts are centered in the Alexandria Cultural Arts District in the downtown. Located within a few blocks of each other are three performance venues: Coughlin-Saunders Performing Arts Center, the Hearn Stage, and the Riverfront Amphitheater.

The Coughlin-Saunders Performing Arts Center is the home of the Rapides Symphony Orchestra, which has performed in Alexandria since 1968. The center hosts the Performing Arts Series of the Arts Council of Central Louisiana, the Red River Chorale (an auditioned community chorus), and presentations of numerous local theater groups. The land for the center was donated by The Alexandria Town Talk newspaper, owned by the Gannett Company of McLean, Virginia.

Businesswoman Jacqueline Seagall Caplan (1935–2016) was the president of the Arts Council of Central Louisiana and the chairman of the group's executive committee when the Coughlin-Saunders Performing Arts Center opened in 2004. She predicted that Coughlin-Saunders would in time "provide a place people can point to and say it's theirs. ... [Until now], we've never had a performing arts center where every type of performing art can come."

The Hearn Stage is a black box theater for smaller productions. The Arts Council provides day-to-day management of both the Coughlin-Saunders Center and the Hearn Stage.

The Riverfront Amphitheater hosts each April a "Jazz on the River" music festival, sponsored by the Arna Bontemps African American Museum. The Rapides Symphony holds an annual fall Pops concert in the amphitheater. In recent years, the amphitheater has welcomed musical guests in conjunction with the springtime Dragonboat Races sponsored by the Alexandria Museum of Art.

The spring and fall seasons also feature Downtown Rocks, a free outdoor concert series in nearby Fulton Park.

== Sports ==
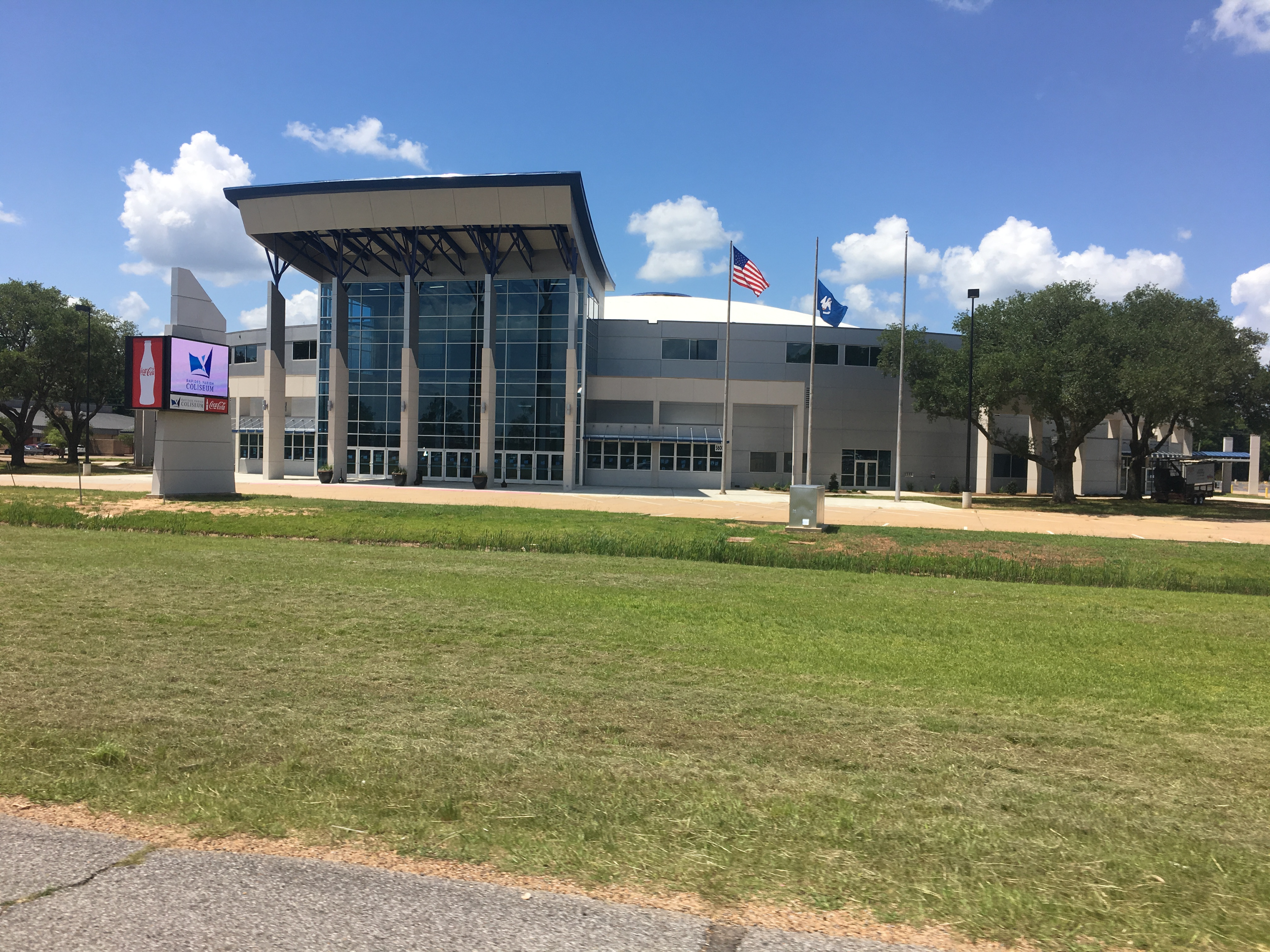
Rapides Parish Coliseum on Louisiana Highway 28

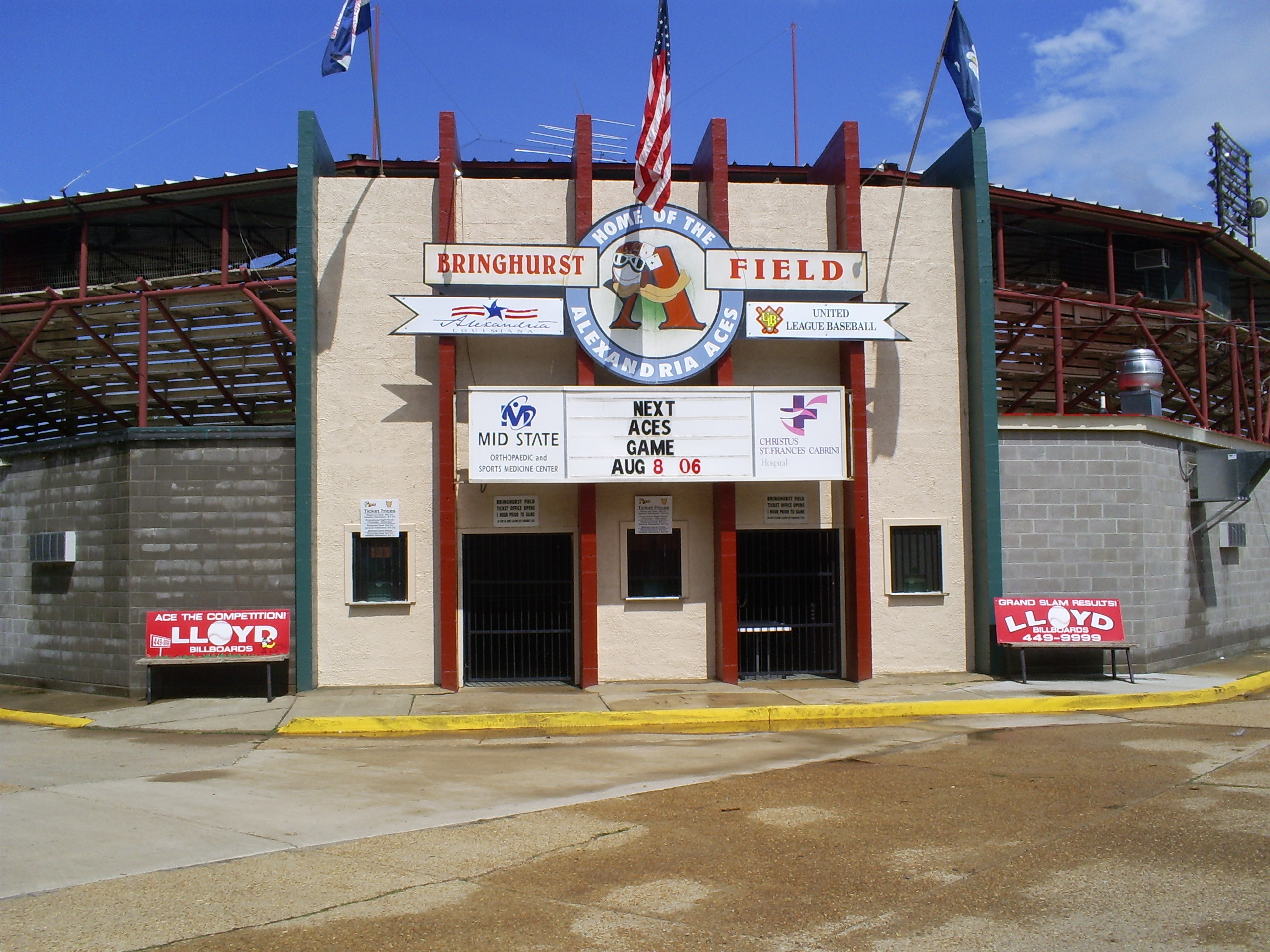
Entrance to Bringhurst Field (built in 1934)

Alexandria was home to the Alexandria Aces, a minor league baseball team that debuted as part of the Evanngeline League in 1934. The Aces played a total of 40 professional seasons, with a combined regular season record of 2,424 wins and 2,135 losses, and were seven-time champions, with titles in 1936, 1940, 1997, 1998, 2006, 2007, and 2009. They played their home games at Bringhurst Field, the oldest baseball park in the state of Louisiana. In 1974, a Little League team from Alexandria won the Louisiana state championship.

Alexandria had a minor league ice hockey team, the Alexandria Warthogs. They played their home games at the Rapides Parish Coliseum.

A professional indoor football team, the Louisiana Rangers, played their home games at the Rapides Parish Coliseum. They played in the Central District of the Southern American Football League, and the Southern Conference of the National Indoor Football League (NIFL). The team was owned by a Lafayette business group before moving in 2003 to Beaumont, Texas.

Soccer has also become a growing interest in the area. The Crossroads Soccer Association has had multiple youth teams achieve success in various travel soccer leagues. One of the earliest teams to do so was the then- U-14 Crossroads Pride soccer team, winning the 2012 Louisiana Soccer Association State Cup.

Also run by Crossroads is Alexandria's first amateur soccer team, Central Louisiana FC (formerly called Pool Boys FC and Alexandria Pool Boys FC). They are a founding member of the Gulf Coast Premier League, playing their games at Johnny Downs Sports Complex and Louisiana Christian University's Wildcat Stadium in neighboring Pineville. Central Louisiana FC runs both men's and women's amateur teams, as well as a developmental team that competes in the GCL2, the Gulf Coast Premier League's second division.

Nearby is Bringhurst Golf Course, popularly known as "the nation's oldest par-three course." A full-scale renovation was completed in mid-2010. In addition to Bringhurst, named for the late industrialist R.W. Bringhurst, Alexandria is home to four other golf courses: Oak Wing, The Links on the Bayou, at LSUA, and Alexandria Golf and Country Club.

Alexandria was also home to the Cenla Derby Dames, a roller derby team that operates under the Women's Flat Track Derby Association. The Dames played their home games at the Rapides Parish Coliseum.

== Notable people ==
- Emmanuel Arceneaux – Canadian football player
- Jay Aldrich – Major League Baseball player
- John Ardoin – music critic for The Dallas Morning News
- Louis Berry – first African-American to practice law in Alexandria
- Chris Boniol – American football player
- Arna Bontemps – African American poet and member of Harlem Renaissance
- Thomas "Bud" Brady – state representative (1976–1988)
- Bubby Brister – Quarterback for several teams
- T. C. Brister – member of the Louisiana House of Representatives
- Markel Brown – guard in the Israeli Basketball Premier League
- Arthur H. Butler – Marine Corps Major General and Navy Cross recipient
- D. J. Chark – American football player
- Carl B. Close – state representative (1944–1947)
- Luther F. Cole – associate justice of the Louisiana Supreme Court
- Clifford Ann Creed – golfer; winner of eleven LPGA Tour events
- Israel B. Curtis – African-American Democratic member of the Louisiana House of Representatives
- Bryan Dauzat – NASCAR driver
- Cleveland Dear – U.S. representative and state district court judge
- Demar Dotson – American football player
- C. H. "Sammy" Downs – attorney and politician
- James R. Eubank – Alexandria lawyer; member of the Louisiana House of Representatives
- Steve Gainer – Cinematographer and Director
- H. N. Goff – state representative from Rapides Parish, 1952–1956; insurance agent in Alexandria
- Layon Gray – Playwright and director of the Off-Broadway play Black Angels Over Tuskegee
- Lawrence Preston Joseph Graves – Roman Catholic bishop of Alexandria from 1973 to 1982
- Charles Pasquale Greco – Roman Catholic bishop of Alexandria from 1946 to 1973
- Jeff Hall – first African-American mayor of Alexandria
- Eric Johanson – blues rock musician
- Josh Johnson – comedian
- Catherine D. Kimball – former Chief Justice of the Louisiana Supreme Court
- Maxie Lambright – football coach for Louisiana Tech University, 1967–1978
- D.L. Lang – Poet Laureate of Vallejo, California
- John Leglue – NFL player
- F.A. Little, Jr. – retired judge of the United States District Court for the Western District of Louisiana
- George S. Long – former U.S. representative
- Gillis William Long – former U.S. representative
- Jay Luneau – lawyer and state senator, effective January 2016
- J. Clifford MacDonald – businessman and recipient of the Presidential Medal of Freedom
- Gerald Archie Mangun – pastor of the Pentecostal Church
- Anna Margaret – singer, actress
- Rod Masterson – actor
- Terry Alan "Tet" Mathews – former Major League Pitcher
- Warren Morris – Major League Baseball player
- Craig Nall – National Football League player
- J. Tinsley Oden – mathematician
- Charles Frederick Page (1864–1937), American airship inventor
- Jewel Prestage – first African-American woman to earn a Ph.D. in political science
- Juan Pierre – Major League Baseball player
- Ed Rand – state representative from 1960 to 1964
- Joe Ray – contemporary visual artist
- Joseph E. Ransdell – U.S. Senator from Louisiana, 1913–1931
- Slater Rhea – Singer and TV personality on national TV in China
- Jalen Richard – NFL player
- Sterling Ridge – Arizona legislator
- Alvin Benjamin Rubin – federal judge, 1966–1991
- Jock Scott – Louisiana legislator
- Bill Schroll – National Football League player
- Gustav Anton von Seckendorff – author, actor and declaimer
- William Tecumseh Sherman – first superintendent; Louisiana State Seminary of Learning & Military Academy
- Russ Springer – Major League Baseball player for 18 years
- Grove Stafford, Sr. – Alexandria lawyer and state senator from 1940 to 1948
- Leroy Augustus Stafford – planter and Confederate brigadier general
- Lloyd George Teekell – 9th Judicial District Court judge from 1979 to 1990
- Jeff R. Thompson – judge of the 26th Judicial District Court since 2015
- Cullen Washington Jr. – contemporary abstract painter
- Muse Watson – actor
- James Madison Wells – 19th century governor of Louisiana
- Rebecca Wells – author best known for Divine Secrets of the Ya-Ya Sisterhood
- Joanne Lyles White – founder and first president of the Louisiana Speech League
- Lamar White Jr. – investigative journalist, writer, disability rights activist
- J. Robert Wooley – Louisiana insurance commissioner was reared in Alexandria

== Media ==
=== Newspapers ===
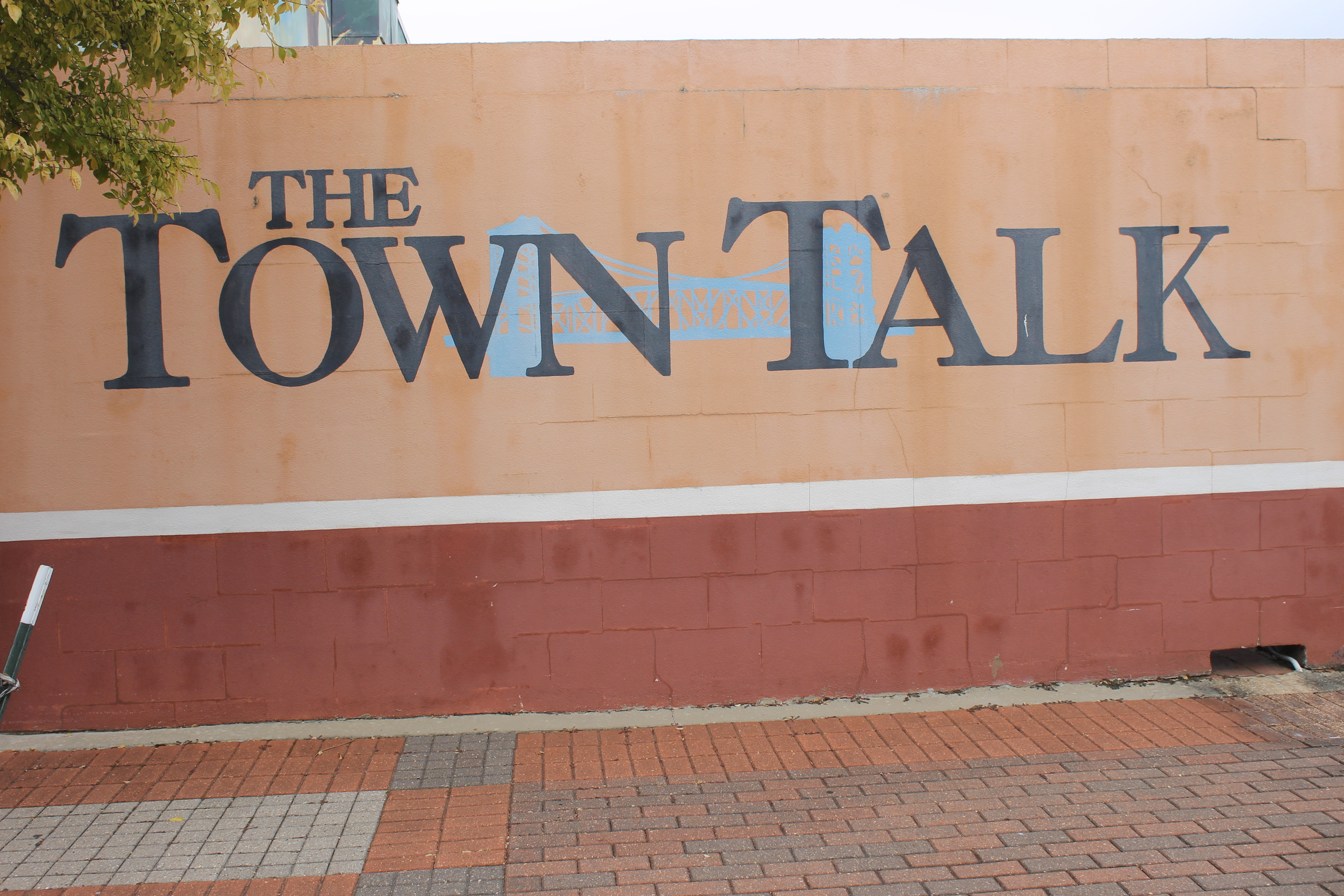
The Alexandria Town Talk offices are located downtown on Third Street.

Established March 17, 1883, The Alexandria Town Talk is a daily newspaper for Alexandria-Pineville and the thirteen parishes which comprise central Louisiana. The newspaper was owned by the family of the late Jane Wilson Smith and Joe D. Smith, Jr., until March 1996, when it was sold to Central Newspapers. In August 2000, the Gannett Company acquired the Central Newspapers properties, including The Town Talk. The name of the paper on its inaugural issue was the Alexandria Daily Town Talk. Although it has since been shorted to the current The Town Talk, it is still frequently referred to by long-time residents as the Daily Town Talk.

=== Television ===
Alexandria is served by local television stations KALB-TV (NBC / CBS/ The CW), WNTZ (Fox), KLAX-TV (ABC), KLPA (PBS/LPB), and KBCA (Heroes & Icons). KALB is the oldest television station in central Louisiana.

== Parks and outdoor attractions ==
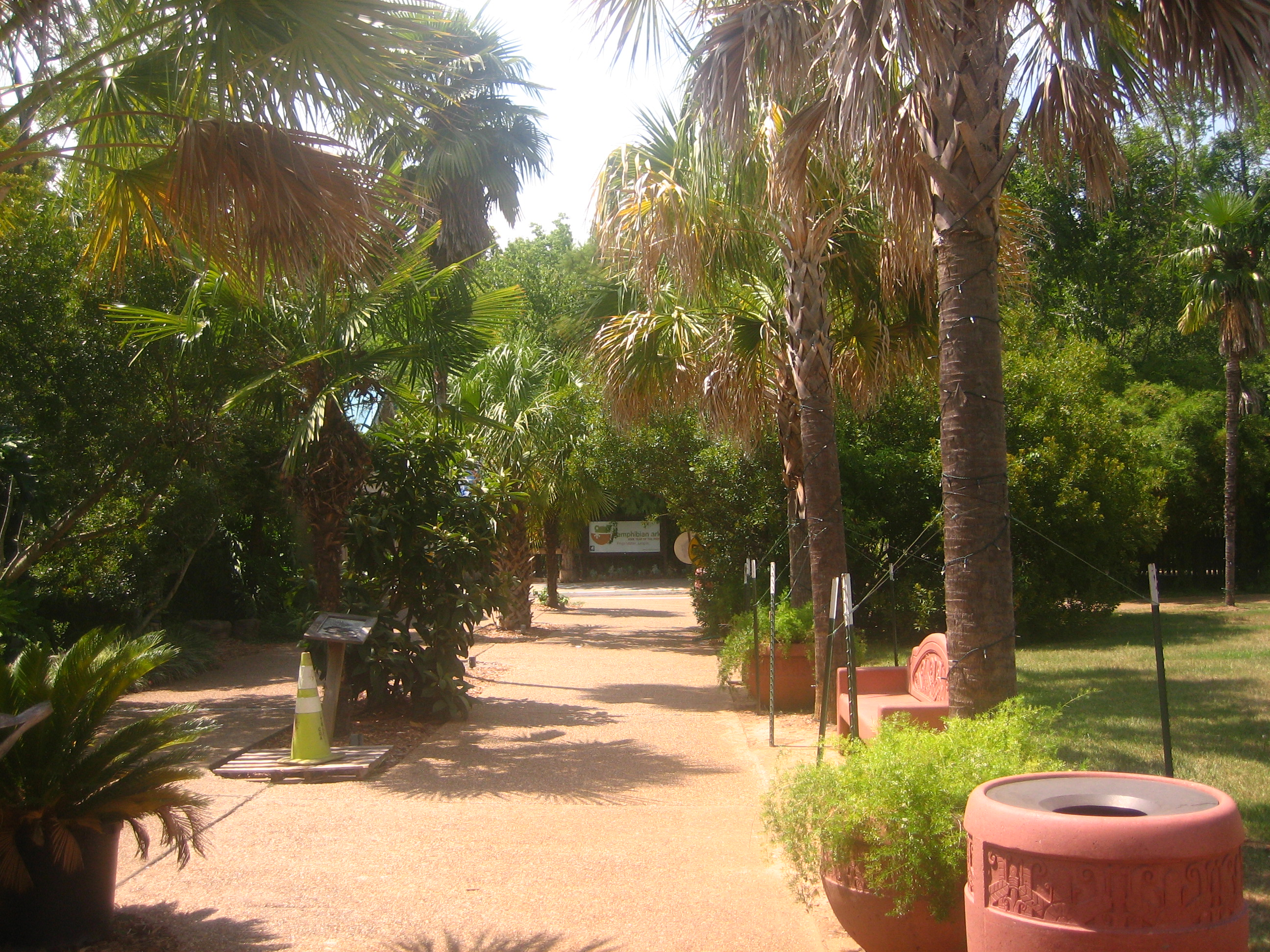
Greenery at Alexandria Zoo

=== Alexandria Zoological Park ===
The Alexandria Zoological Park is a 33-acre (13 ha) zoo first opened to the public in 1926. Owned by the City of Alexandria and operated by the Division of Public Works, it is home to about 500 animals and includes an award-winning Louisiana Habitat exhibit. The zoo is accredited by the Association of Zoos and Aquariums (AZA) and takes part in about 20 Species Survival Plans (SSP) as part of its conservation efforts.

=== Cotile Lake Recreation Area ===
Cotile Lake is a man-made impoundment located in the uplands approximately 15 miles (24 km) west-northwest of Alexandria, Louisiana. The lake is approximately 1,775 acres (7 km^{2}) in size and was completed in October 1965. The Louisiana Wild Life and Fisheries Commission stocked this impoundment with the proper species and number of game fish in 1965–66 shortly after its completion date. The recreational facilities include a large area cleared and zoned for swimming with complete bath house facilities nearby. There is a water skiing area that is cleared and snagged for safety of the skiers. The picnic and camping areas are modern and complete. There is also space available for campers.

=== Indian Creek Lake and Recreation Area ===
Encompasses a 2,250-acre (9 km^{2}) lake, 100 acres (0.4 km^{2}) of developed recreation facilities and a 250 acres (1.0 km^{2}) primitive camping area all within the Alexander State Forest. The lake, located in central Louisiana, was constructed as a joint venture of the Louisiana Forestry Commission, the Rapides Parish Police Jury, and the Lower West Red River Soil and Water Conservation District as a reservoir for agricultural irrigation in times of need and for recreation purposes.

The recreation area camping area contains 109 campsites with conventional full utility hookups, 3 beaches for swimming, bath houses, a boat launch, and 75 picnic sites. A covered pavilion within the developed area provides for groups up to 100 people. The recreation area is open year-round and operates on user fees.

=== Kisatchie National Forest ===
Alexandria sits in the middle of the Kisatchie National Forest. Ranger districts are north, northwest, west and southwest of the city. An abundance of large timberlands and forest nurseries, as well as lake and recreation areas, are within a short driving distance.

== Other points of interest ==
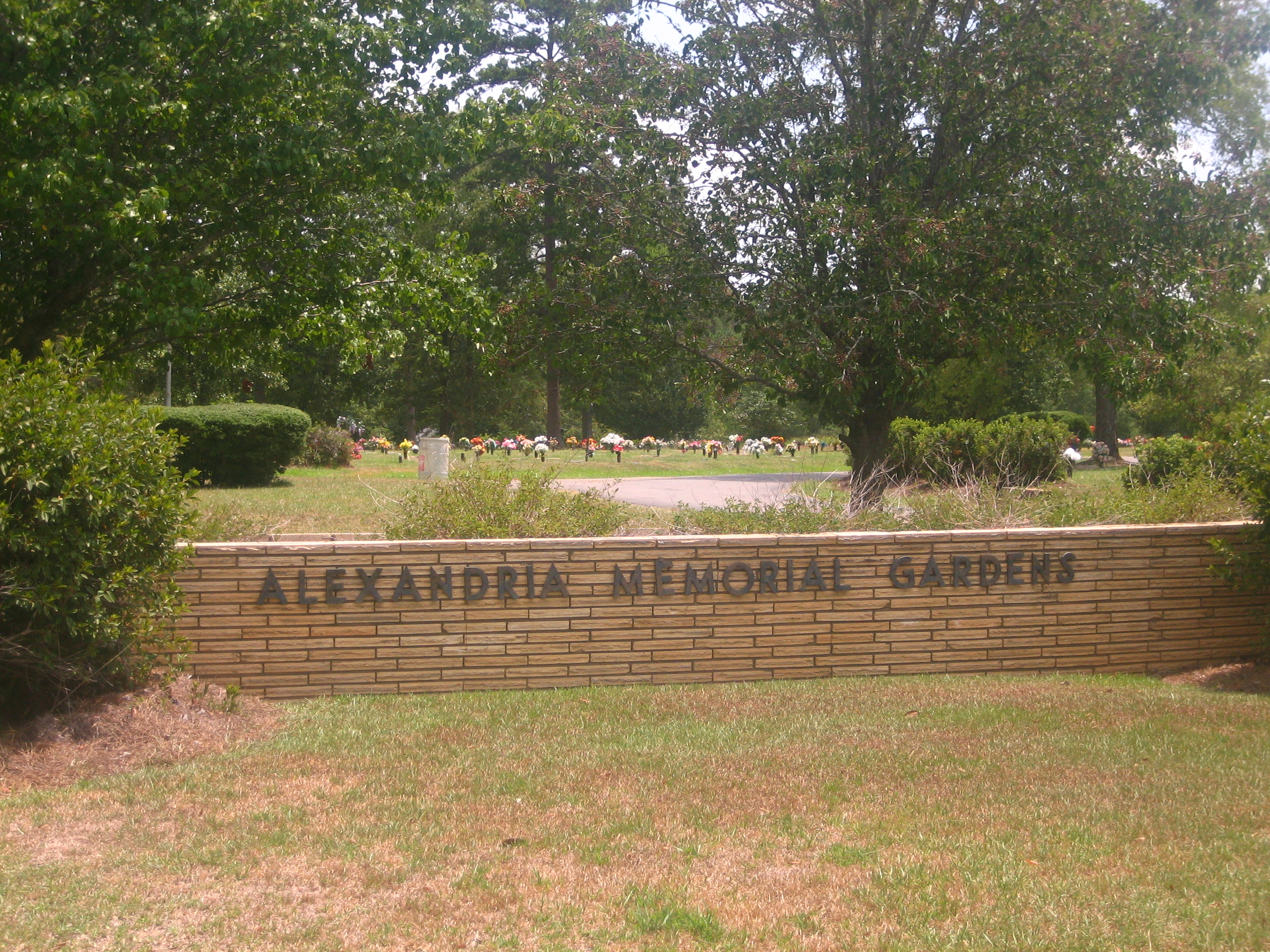
Entrance sign to Alexandria Memorial Gardens

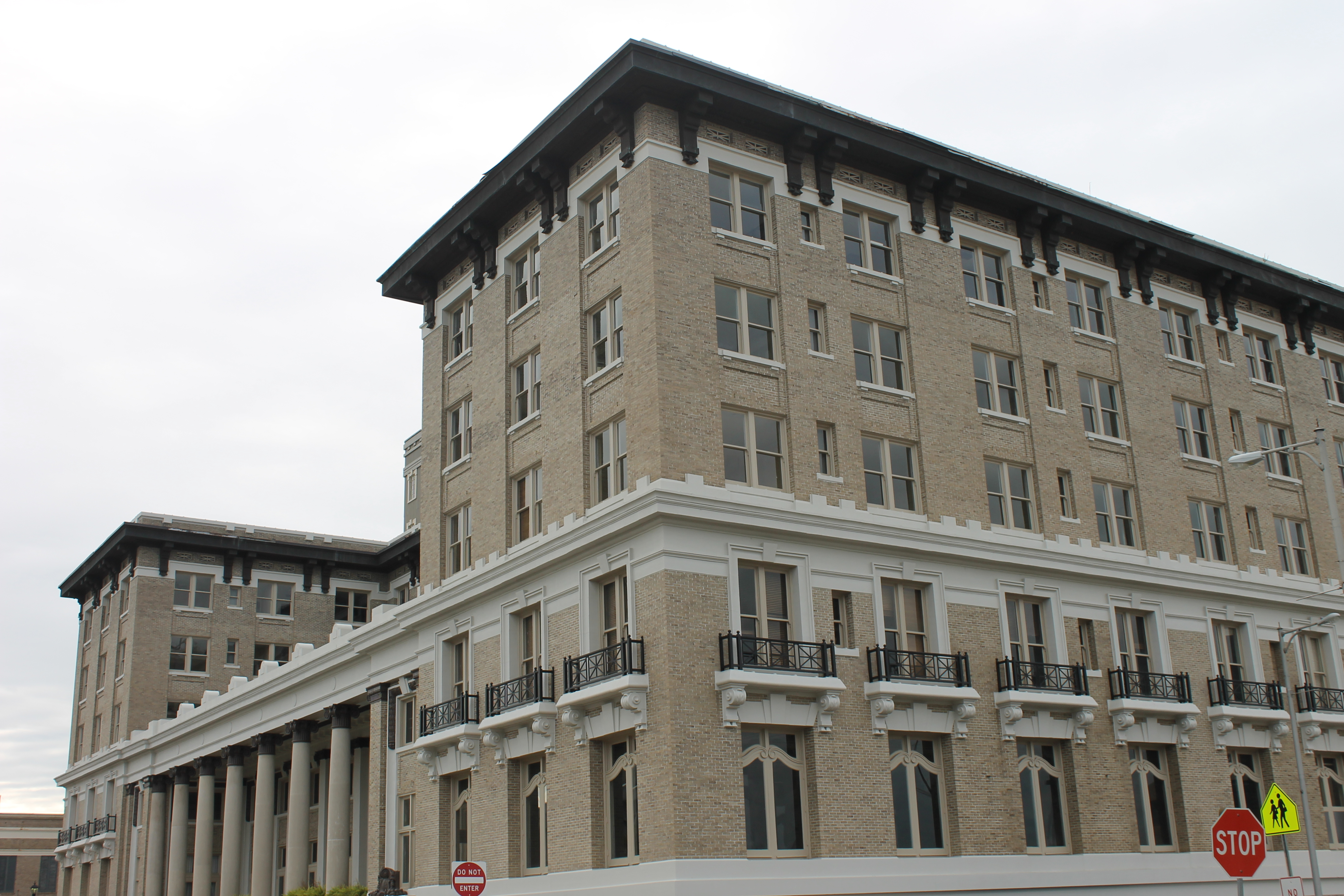
The Hotel Bentley (2014 photo).

- Alexandria Memorial Gardens – Large cemetery on U.S. Highway 165 south. Other cemeteries are also available in Pineville.
- Alexandria Levee Park – A park located downtown, adjacent to the Red River, that serves as the grounds for some local festivals. It contains an amphitheatre that is used for concerts.
- Alexandria Mall – The local shopping mall located on Masonic Drive, established 1973.
- Alexandria Riverfront Center – Convention center located downtown.
- Bringhurst Field – Former home of the Alexandria Aces.
- Bringhurst Park – Contains the Alexandria Zoo, Bringhurst Field, a playground, a golf course and tennis courts.
- Hotel Bentley – Historic hotel built in 1908.
- Inglewood Plantation – Plantation located south of Alexandria.
- Kent Plantation House – French colonial plantation house.
- Masonic Home – A now defunct orphanage in south Alexandria completed in 1924.
- Rapides Parish Coliseum – A multi-purpose arena used for sporting events, conventions and other events.

== Military ==
=== Louisiana National Guard ===
Alexandria is home to both Headquarters and Company B of the 199th Brigade Support Battalion (BSB). The 199th BSB is the logistical component of the 256th Infantry Brigade that served in Operation Iraqi Freedom from October 2004 until September 2005. The 199th BSB provides supply and transportation (Company A), medical (Company C) and maintenance (Company B) support and services that keep the 256th Brigade operational. The battalion also has units located in Jonesboro, Winnfield, Colfax, and St. Martinville, Louisiana.

=== England Air Force Base ===
Alexandria served as the home of England Air Force Base from its origins as an emergency airstrip for Esler Regional Airport until its closure. England AFB was officially closed on December 15, 1992, pursuant to the Defense Base Closure and Realignment Act (Public Law 101–510) and recommendations of the Defense Secretary's Commission on Base Realignment and Closure. The base now serves as Alexandria International Airport (see below).

== Economy ==
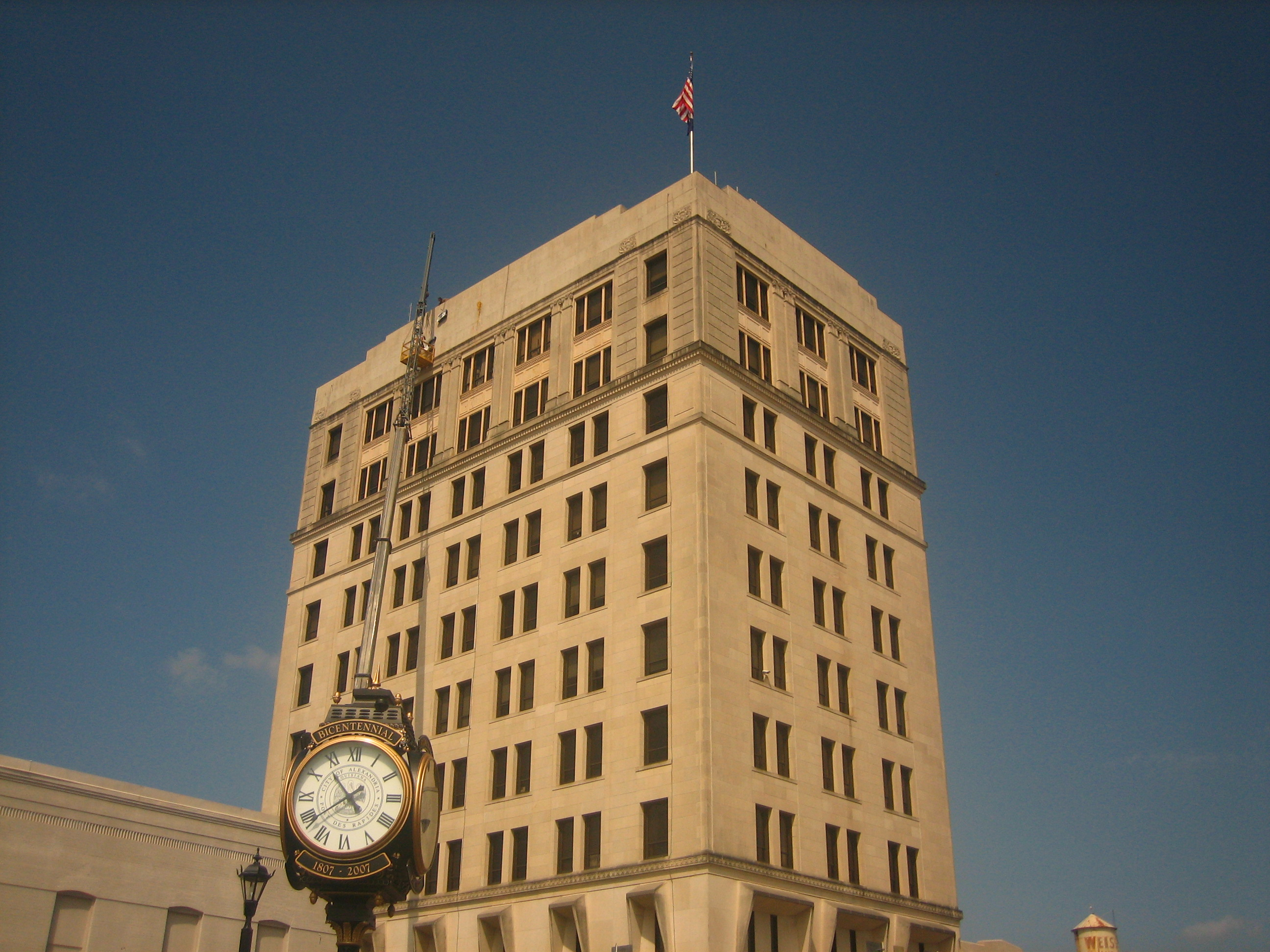
The Tallest building in Alexandria, seen across Third Street from City Hall.

In 2016, the per capita income of Alexandria was $23,962. This was $1,702 lower than the Louisiana average per capita income in the same period. The national figure was $31,128. The Alexandria workforce consists of about 55,000 residents.

Union Tank Car Company has recently located a plant northwest of Alexandria near the airport creating hundreds of jobs. Expansions at the Procter & Gamble plant and the construction of a PlastiPak plant in nearby Pineville have also created a number of new jobs for the area.

Sundrop Fuels Inc., a Colorado-based biofuels start-up, plans to construct an over 1,200 acre plant just southwest of Alexandria in Rapides Station area. The facility will serve as the headquarters for the company because aside from the plant itself, Sundrop has also bought Cowboy Town, an abandoned entertainment venue that sits inside the surrounding land that was purchased, to house their offices and their maintenance and fabrication operations.

=== Healthcare ===
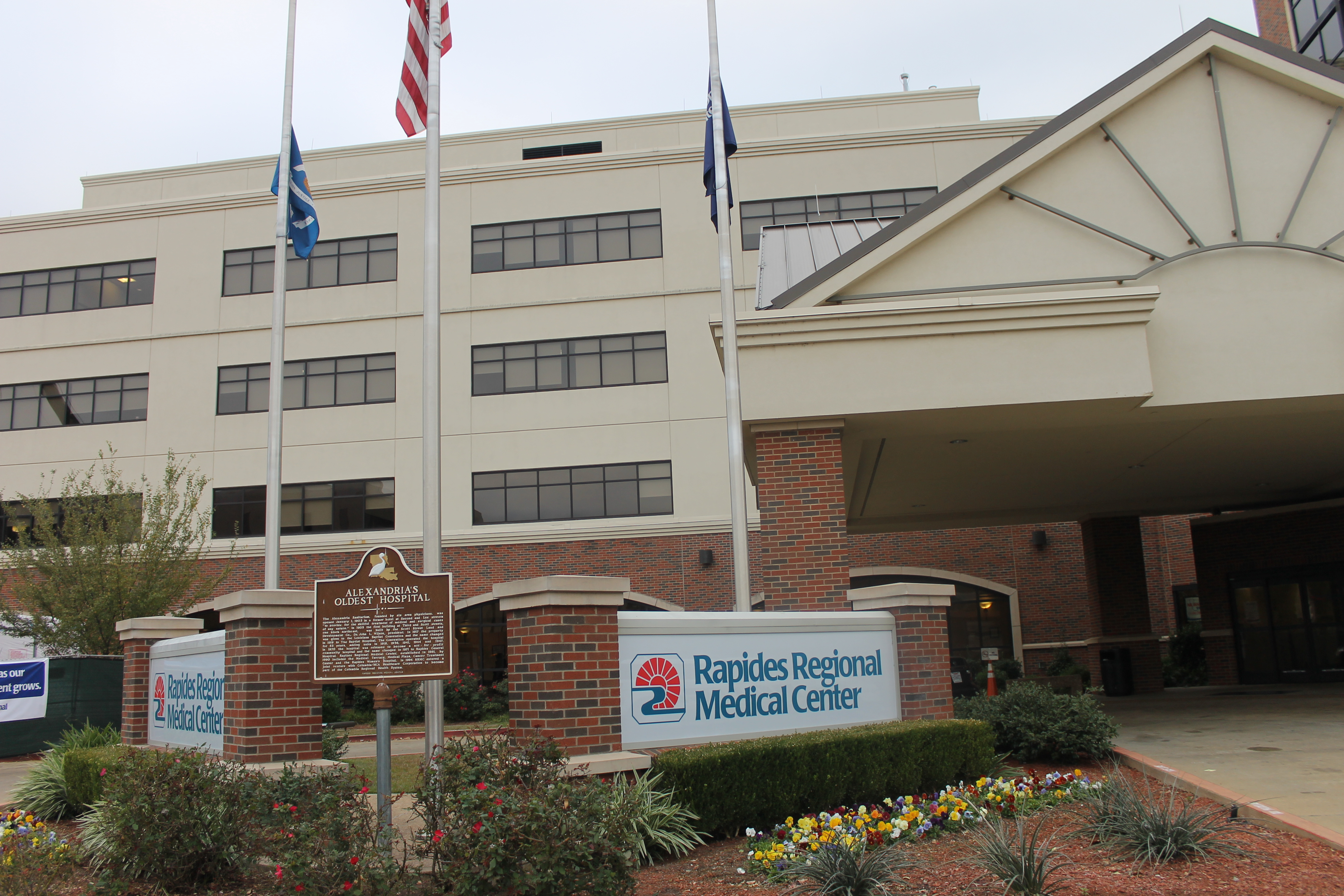
The modern Rapides Regional Medical Center began in 1903 as "Alexandria Sanitarium".

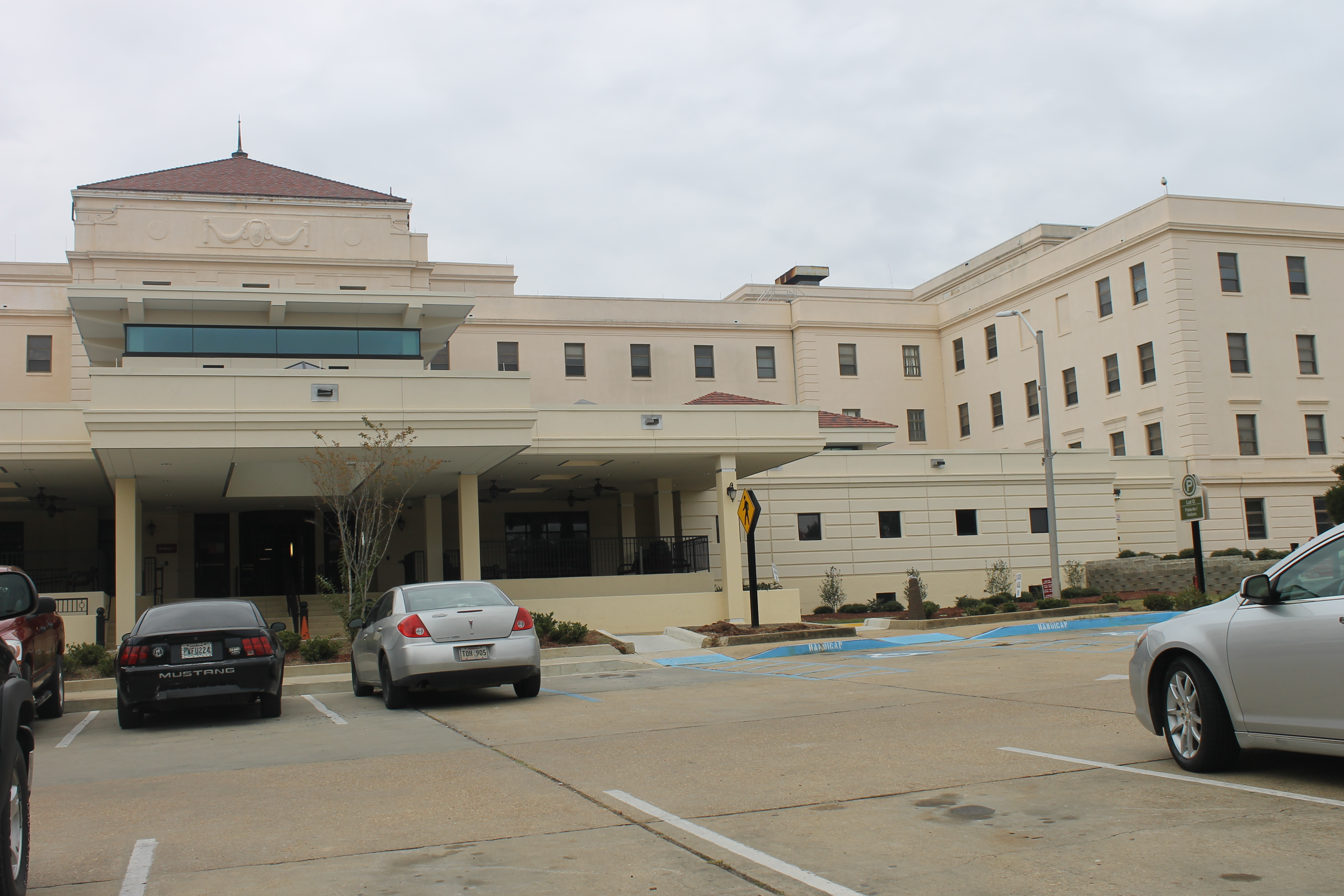
The Alexandria Veterans Administration Hospital is in neighboring Pineville, Louisiana.

Alexandria has two major hospitals: Rapides Regional Medical Center, a former Baptist hospital, is located downtown. Christus St. Frances Cabrini Hospital was opened in 1950 at the corner of Masonic Drive and Texas Avenue. Both hospitals have undergone expansion.

Located just across the Red River in Pineville, the Veteran's Affairs Medical Center at Alexandria serves central Louisiana and surrounding areas.

In 2013, the state allocated $15 million to move the medical services long provided at no or minimal charge at the Huey P. Long Medical Center in Pineville, to the former hospital at England Park at the site of the closed England Air Force Base.

=== Port of Alexandria ===
In the early 19th century, the Port of Alexandria brought goods to the area and shipped cotton and other local products to the rest of the country. A ferry connected the cities of Alexandria and Pineville until a bridge was built across the Red in 1900.

Today, Port facilities include: a 40-ton crane for off-loading, a 15,000-square-foot (1,400 m^{2}) warehouse, 13,600-ton bulk fertilizer warehouse, a 3,400-ton bulk fertilizer dome structure and a 5,000-ton dome which was added in January 2005.

The petroleum off-loading facility includes two 55,000 bbl (8,700 m^{3}) tanks, one 15,000 bbl (2,400 m^{3}) tank capable of handling two barges and five truck off-loading simultaneously. There is also a general cargo dock with access to rail and a hopper barge unloading dock with conveyor system.

Today's modern facilities and the Port's central location with its connection to the Mississippi River provide excellent opportunities for importers and exporters.

=== Alexandria International Airport ===
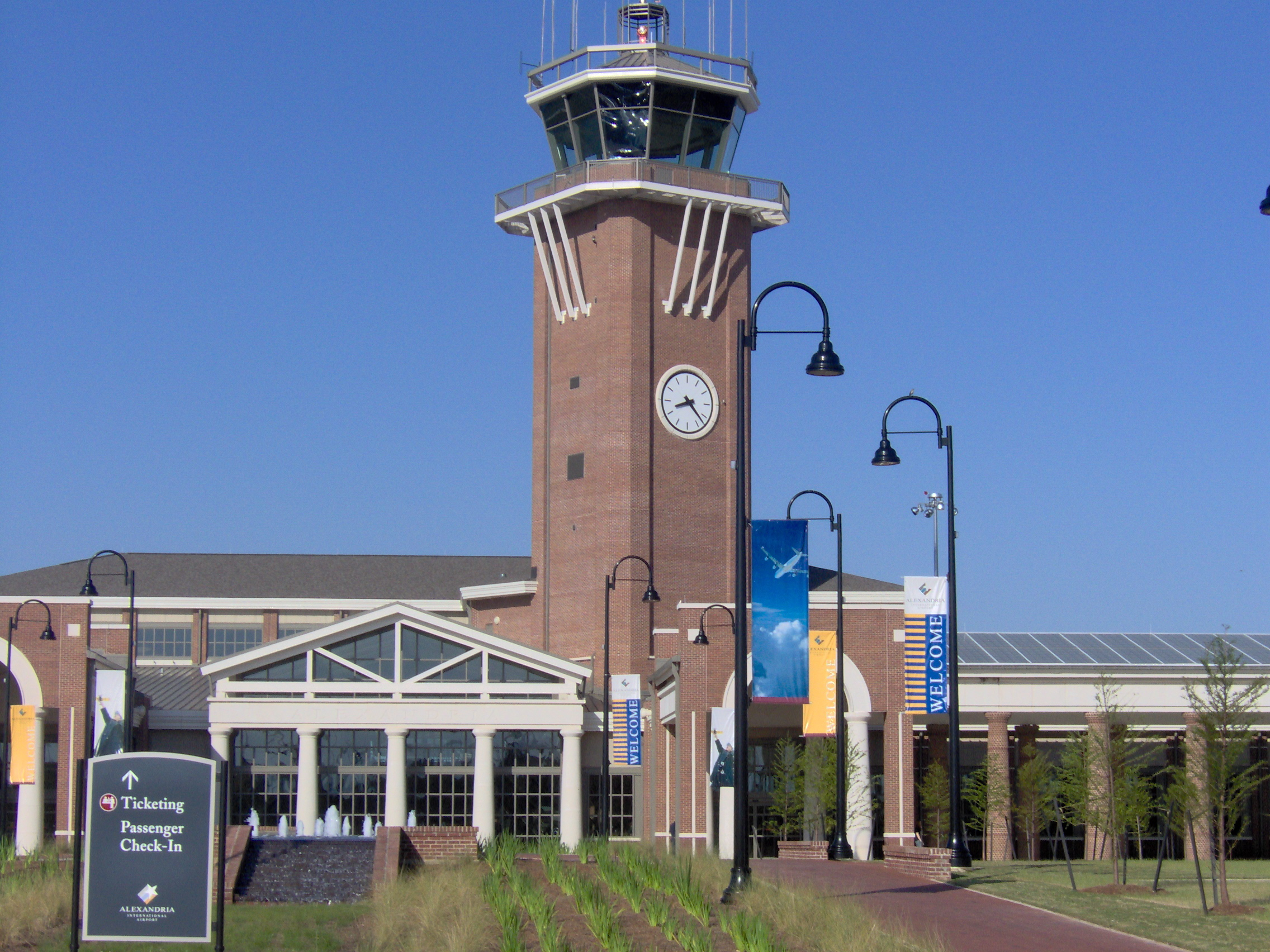
New terminal at AEX

Alexandria International Airport (AEX) is a regional airport, with flights to Atlanta, Dallas/Ft. Worth, and Houston. In 2006 a new-state-of-the-art passenger terminal was dedicated. Alexandria is served by American and Delta.

==== Current military use ====
Formerly known as England AFB until 1992, Alexandria International Airport has numerous international charter airlines using the airport in the transport of military personnel attached to the United States Army base at Fort Polk. A new military personnel terminal opened in 2007.

== Government and politics ==
=== Local government ===
==== History ====
Following the Civil War, all public records in Alexandria were destroyed. In September 1868, the city was granted a new charter with a government consisting of a Mayor, Treasurer, and Justice of the Peace. Nine aldermen represented the four wards of the city – two from each ward and one elected at-large.

In 1912, the Lawrason Act established Alexandria municipal government in a strong mayor format, where the mayor was also the Commissioner of Public Health and Safety (Police, Fire, Sanitation). There were separate Commissioners of Streets and Parks and Finance and Utilities, elected citywide. Those positions were discontinued in 1977.

==== Today ====
Alexandria has a mayoral-council system of government. The Mayor serves as the executive branch of the local government.

The City Council serves as the legislative branch. The five districts of the city are represented on the council. Two council members are elected to serve as at-large representatives of the city.

The Alexandria Court has a limited jurisdiction, consisting of the citizens of Wards 1, 2 and 8 in Rapides Parish. Within those boundaries the court has the power to hear and decide criminal and civil cases, rule in civil cases and hand down judgment for punishment in criminal cases.

=== US congressional district ===
From 1913 to 1993, Alexandria served as the seat of Louisiana's eighth congressional district. A Democratic seat, it was held by the Long family for nearly half of its existence, from 1953 to 1987, broken only by the two terms of Harold B. McSween and three terms of Republican Clyde Holloway of Forest Hill. The seat was removed after the 1990 census indicated Louisiana no longer had the population to support it.

The district was split among the fourth, fifth and sixth districts. Alexandria is currently in the fifth district and was represented from 2003 to 2013 by Rodney Alexander, a Democrat-turned-Republican. From November 2013 to January 2015 the representative was Vance McAllister of Ouachita Parish. Since March 2021, the fifth has been represented by Julia Letlow of Start in Richland Parish.

== Education ==
=== Colleges and universities ===
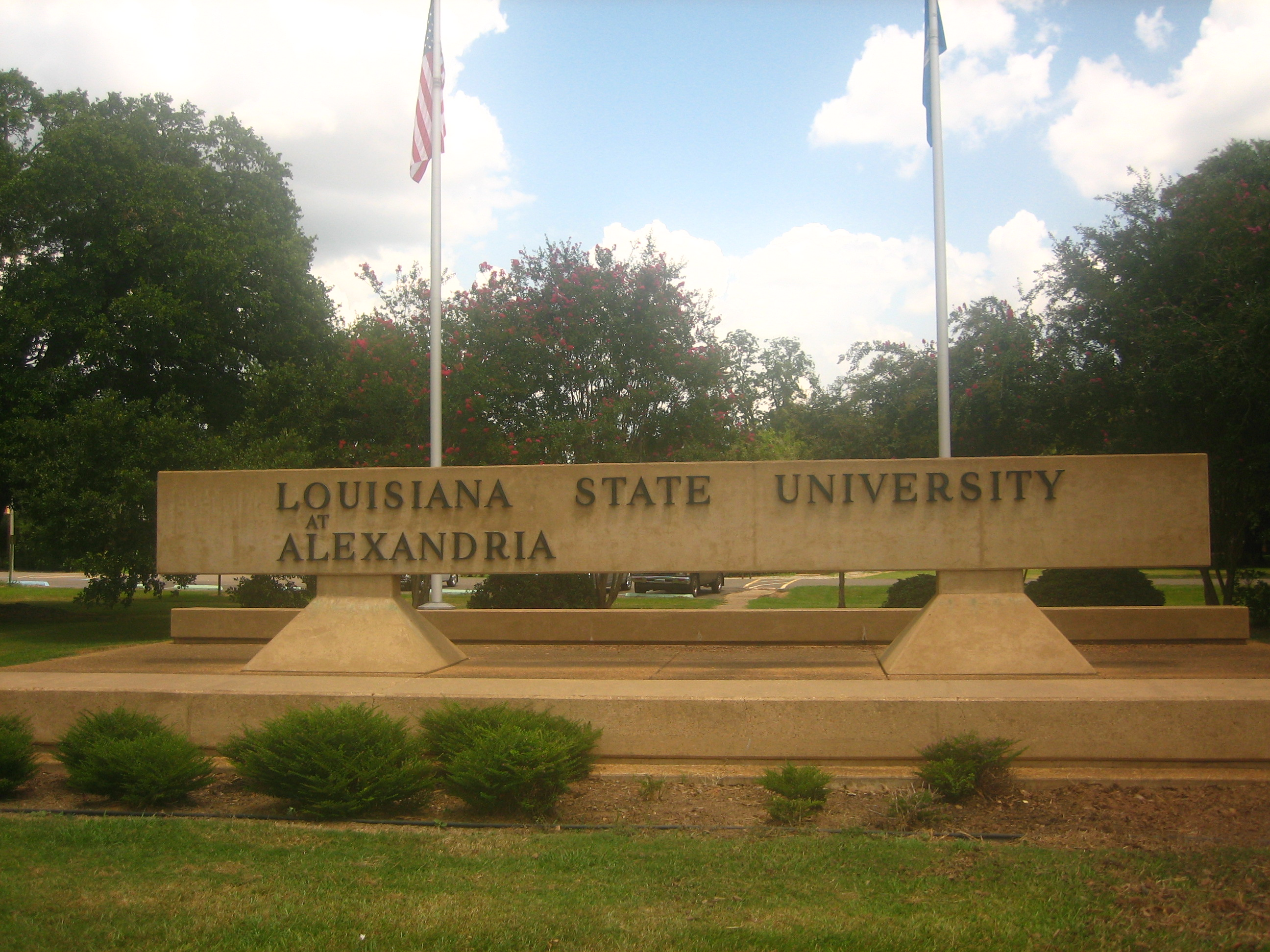
Louisiana State University at Alexandria off U.S. Highway 71 south

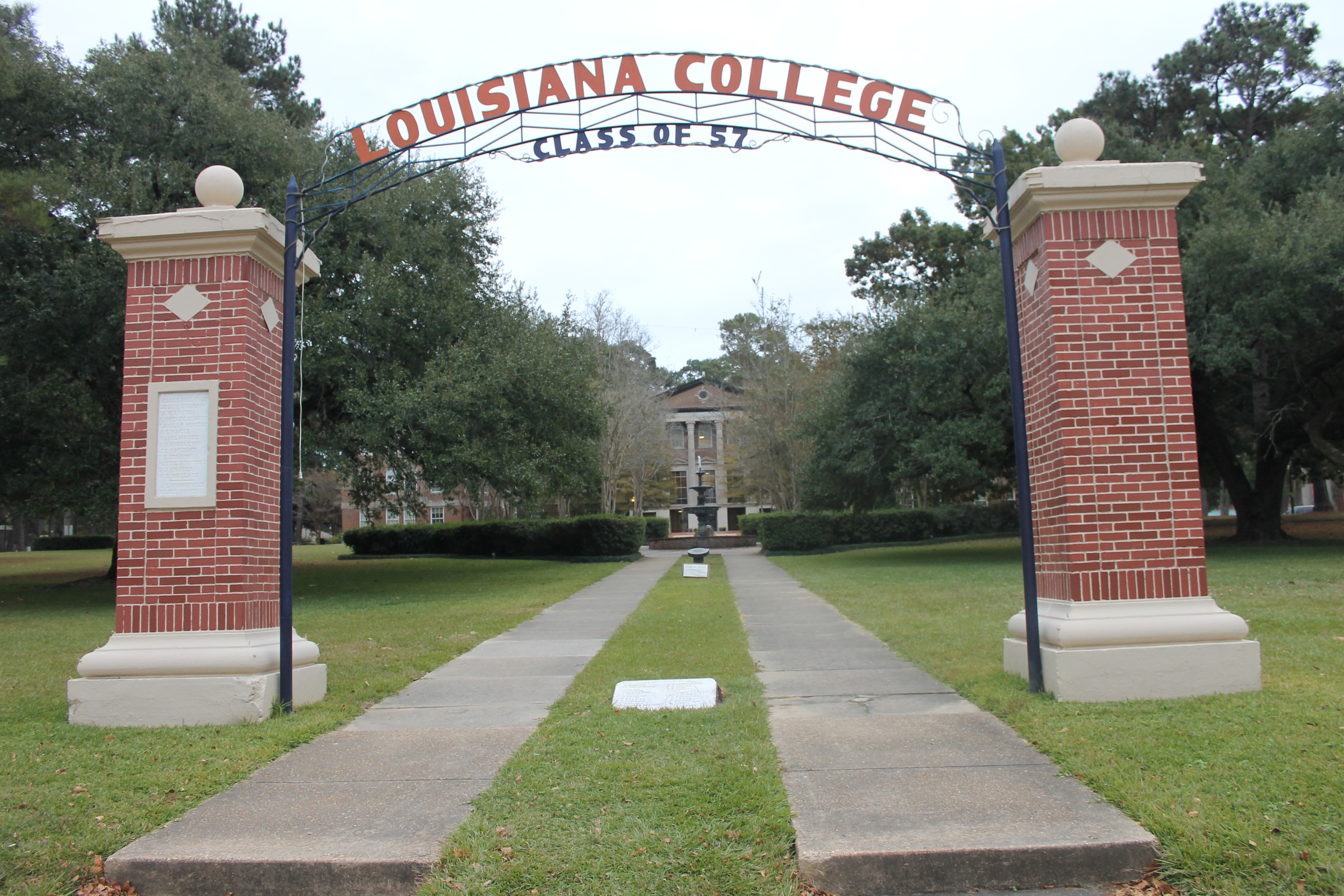
The entrance to Southern Baptist-affiliated Louisiana Christian University in Pineville

Situated south of the city, Louisiana State University at Alexandria (LSUA) is a regional campus of the state's flagship university system, Louisiana State University. From its establishment in 1959, the campus offered only two-year degrees. Students seeking baccalaureate degrees had to commute or move to the main campus in Baton Rouge in order to gain a four-year degree.

After 1976, students could either commute or telecommute to attend upper-level courses, including graduate classes. In 2002, following approval by the Louisiana State University Board of Supervisors and the Louisiana Board of Regents the Louisiana Legislature passed legislation allowing LSUA to offer baccalaureate degrees.

A four-year degree is also attainable through Southern Baptist-affiliated Louisiana Christian University in Pineville, founded in 1906.

Rapides Parish is in the service area of Central Louisiana Technical Community College. Two of the college's campuses, including its main campus and administration, are located in Alexandria.

=== Primary and secondary schools ===
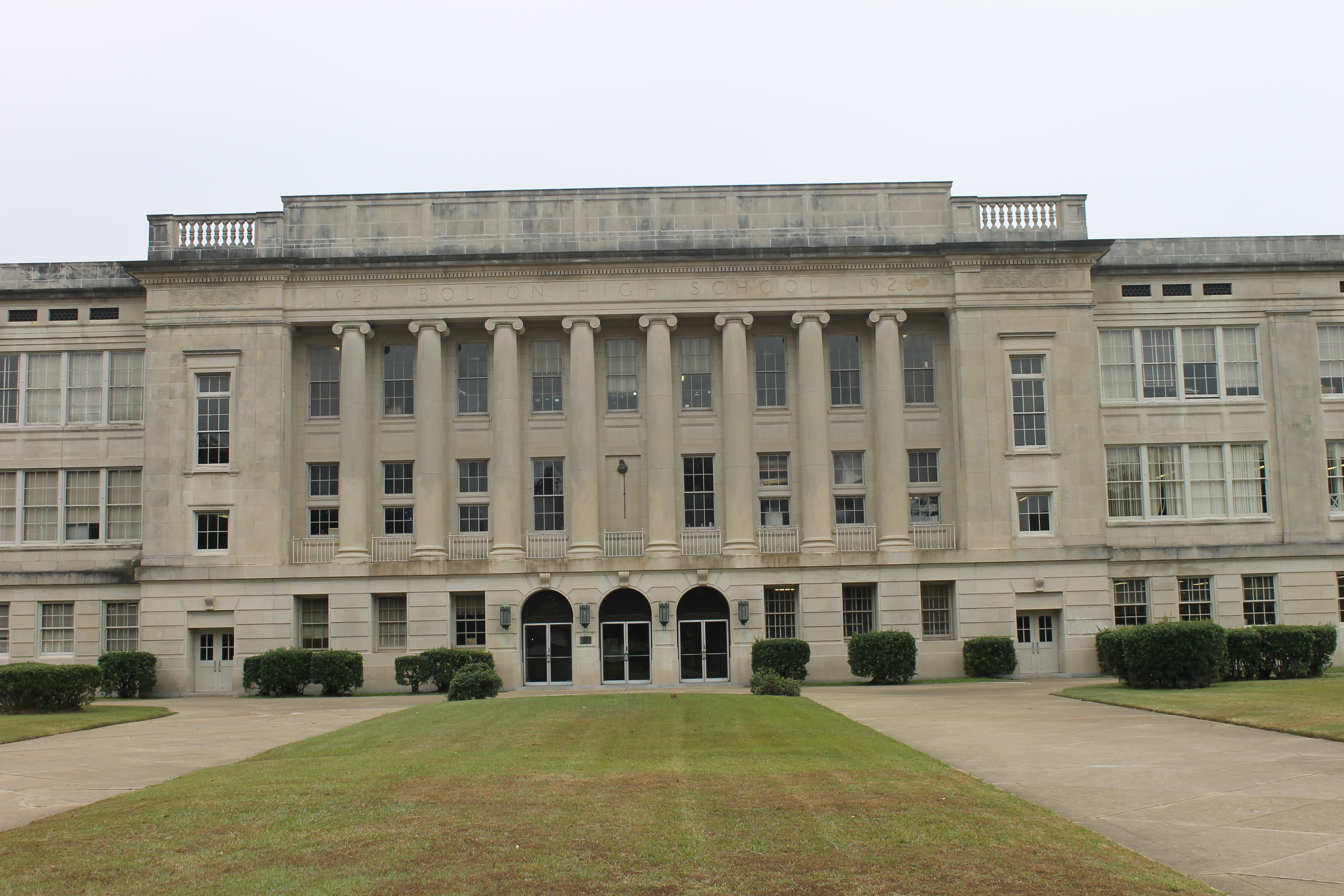
Bolton High School in the Alexandria Garden District

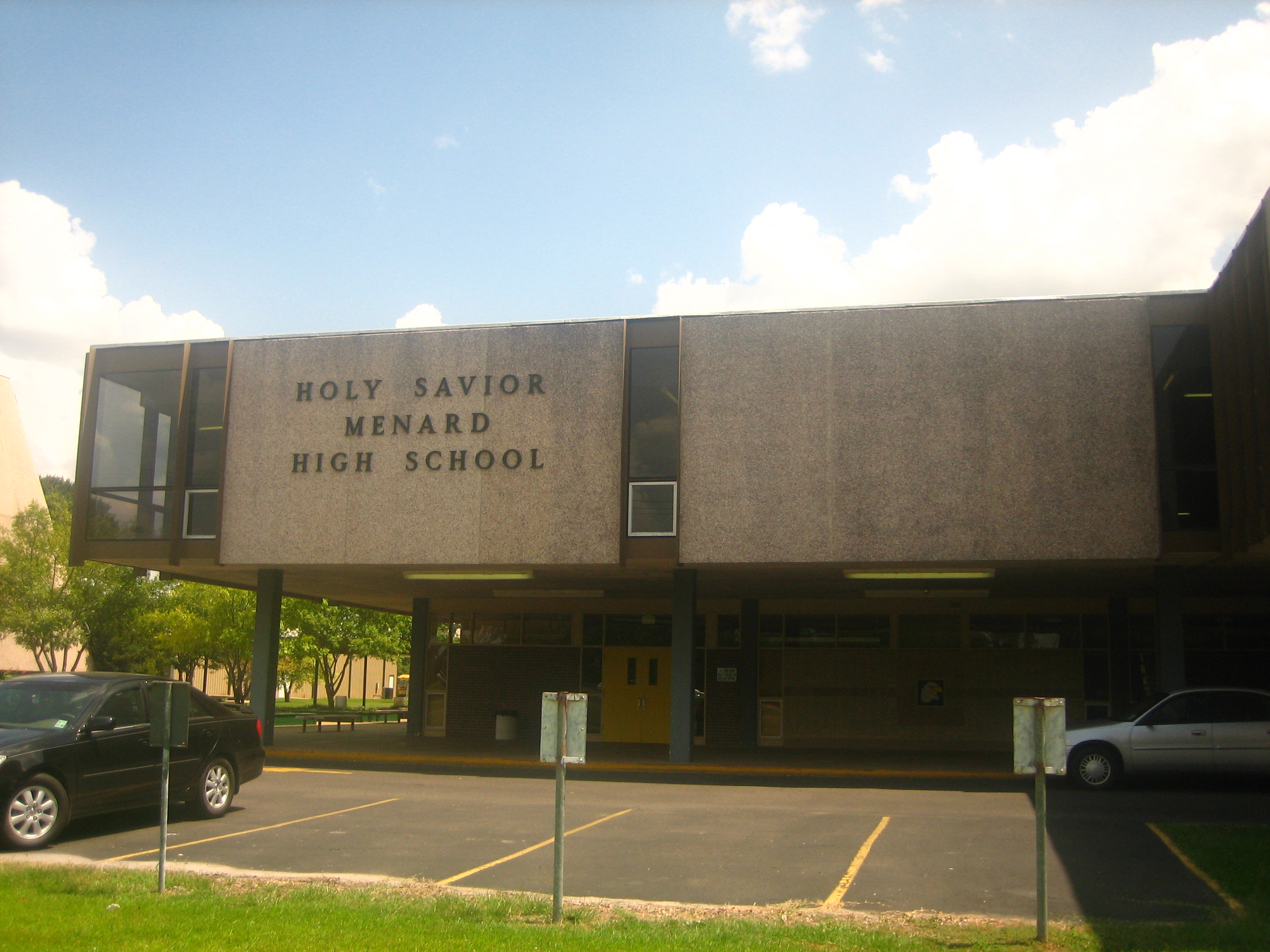
Holy Savior Menard Central High School on Louisiana Highway 28 West

Rapides Parish School Board operates public schools.

Alexandria has three public high schools: Bolton High School, Alexandria Senior High School, and Peabody Magnet High School. There are two private high schools: the Roman Catholic Holy Savior Menard Central High School, and Grace Christian.

== Transportation ==
=== Roads ===
Alexandria serves as the crossroads of Louisiana. To reach either Shreveport or Monroe from the southern portion of the state, the easiest method of travel takes the driver through Alexandria. Likewise, if a visitor is to head from the northern portion of the state to the Cajun portions of the state (Lake Charles and Lafayette), or the greater metropolitan areas of either Baton Rouge or New Orleans, the easiest method of travel involves driving down Interstate 49 through Alexandria.

In addition to I-49, travelers can follow Louisiana 1 up to Alexandria from Baton Rouge and points south. Also, Highway 167 could be taken from Opelousas north to Ruston, crossing through Alexandria at one of the few bridges over the Red River in central Louisiana. Highways 165 and 71 also link Alexandria and points south with the northern and southern portions of the state via the Curtis-Coleman bridge.

There are talks about a 50-80 mile, 4 lane beltway to encircle Alexandria and Pineville, and an East-West Interstate (I14) connecting Natchez, MS and Jasper, TX called the Gulf Coast Strategic Highway. As of now, they are in the planning stages of development.

=== Bridges ===
Three road bridges cross the Red River in the Alexandria area. They are:

- The Purple Heart Memorial Bridge. Part of the Alexandria-Pineville Expressway (also referred to as the Cottingham Expressway), it connects Interstate 49 to Highway 167 by crossing the Red River from downtown Alexandria to Pineville. It replaced the Fulton Street Bridge and has six lanes of traffic. Designed by the Louisiana Department of Transportation and Development (LADOTD), the bridge cost $15.9 million in federal and state funds. The northbound portion was completed in 1995, the southbound in 1998.

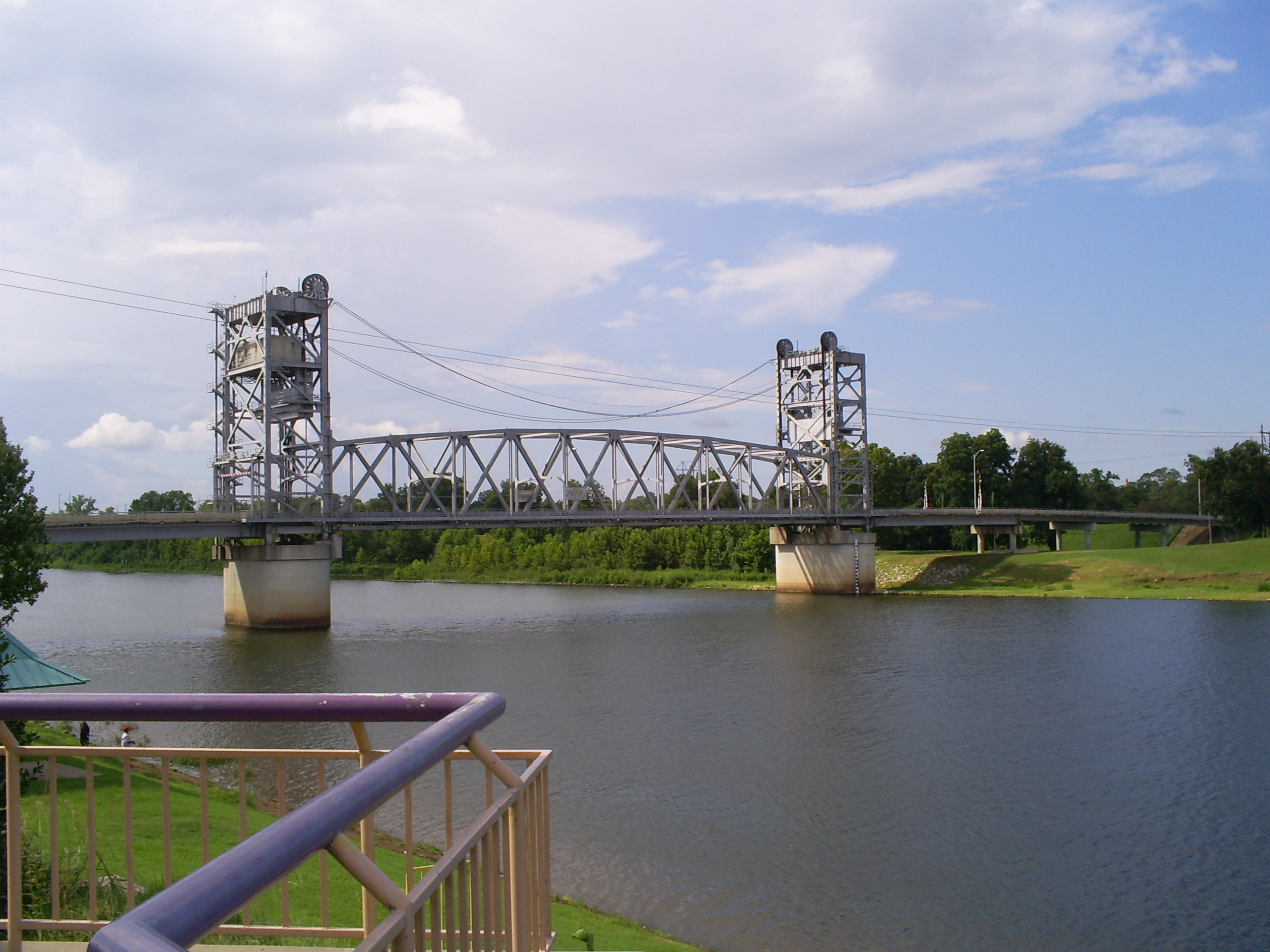
The Jackson Street Bridge

- The U.S. 165 Business Bridge (alternatively, the Gillis Long Bridge, the Red River Bridge or the Jackson Street Bridge) connecting downtown Pineville with the business district in Alexandria. It is a two-lane vertical-lift bridge with a sidewalk/bikepath on either side. The bridge is named after U.S. Representative Gillis Long, who represented Louisiana's Eighth Congressional District. It was built in 1985 to replace the Murray Street Bridge.
- The Curtis-Coleman (Fort Buhlow) Bridge A new four-lane (two lanes in each direction) bridge was built beside the aging OK Allen Bridge and opened in May, 2016. At that time US 165 will be completely four-laned for most of its traverse of Louisiana. It was demolished on September 26, 2015.

Former bridges include:

- The Murray Street Bridge. One of the first bridges in Alexandria. A two-lane steel truss swing bridge, it decayed over time, finally being demolished in 1983. The approach on the Alexandria side was turned into a river overlook as part of the Alexandria Levee Park.
- The Fulton Street Bridge. Named after Fulton Street which it connected with Highway 167. Technically part of the Alexandria-Pineville Expressway, it was a four-lane steel vertical-lift bridge. It was demolished in 1994 to make way for the Purple Heart Memorial Bridge.
- The Oscar K. Allen Bridge connected Highway 165/71 on both sides of the Red River. It was a two-lane K-truss type bridge, named after Governor Oscar K. Allen. It was built in 1936 to connect Alexandria to the (former) Fort Buhlow. It was replaced by the Curtis-Coleman (Fort Buhlow) Bridge next to it.

There are two railroad bridges over the Red River in Alexandria. One is located near the Buhlow area north of the OK Allen bridge. The other is south of the Purple Heart Memorial Bridge.

=== Mass transit ===
Regional mass transit is handled by ATRANS (Alexandria Transportation Authority).

For those leaving or arriving at the city by bus, Greyhound Lines has a terminal downtown.

=== Airports ===
Alexandria is served by the Alexandria International Airport and the Esler Regional Airport in Pineville.

=== Rail ===
Alexandria does not have Amtrak service, or a commuter rail system. The Kansas City Southern (Southern Belle) and the Missouri Pacific (since absorbed by Union Pacific) (Louisiana Eagle and Louisiana Daylight) operated train stations in the area in the early part of the 20th century. Passenger services ended in the 1960s and the stations have closed.

== Surrounding cities and towns ==
Rapides Parish

- Ball
- Boyce
- Cheneyville
- Deville
- Forest Hill
- Lecompte
- Pineville
- Tioga
- Woodworth

Grant Parish

- Colfax
- Creola
- Dry Prong
- Pollock
- Prospect

== Gallery ==
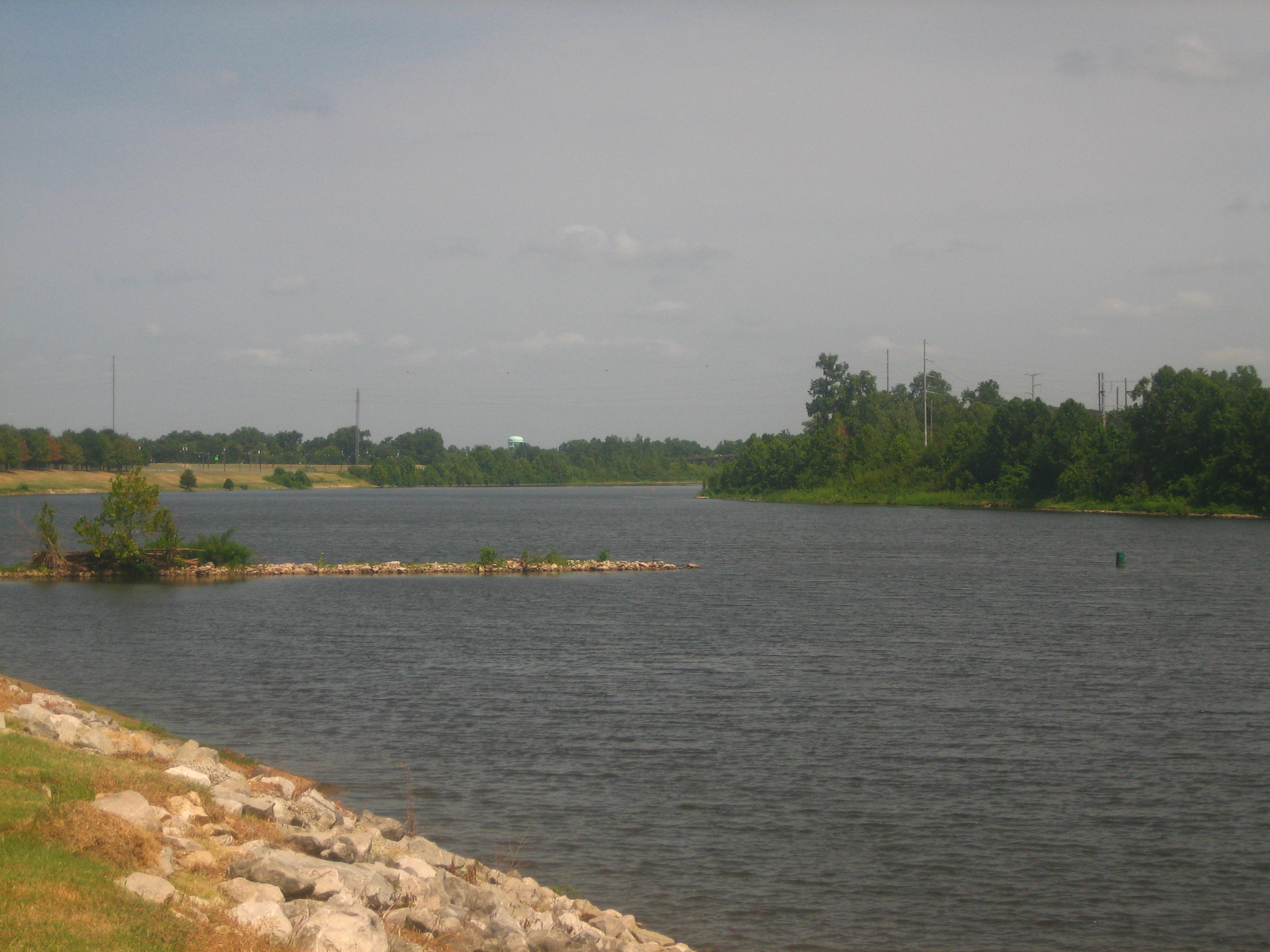
A scenic view of the Red River of the South taken from a levee in Alexandria

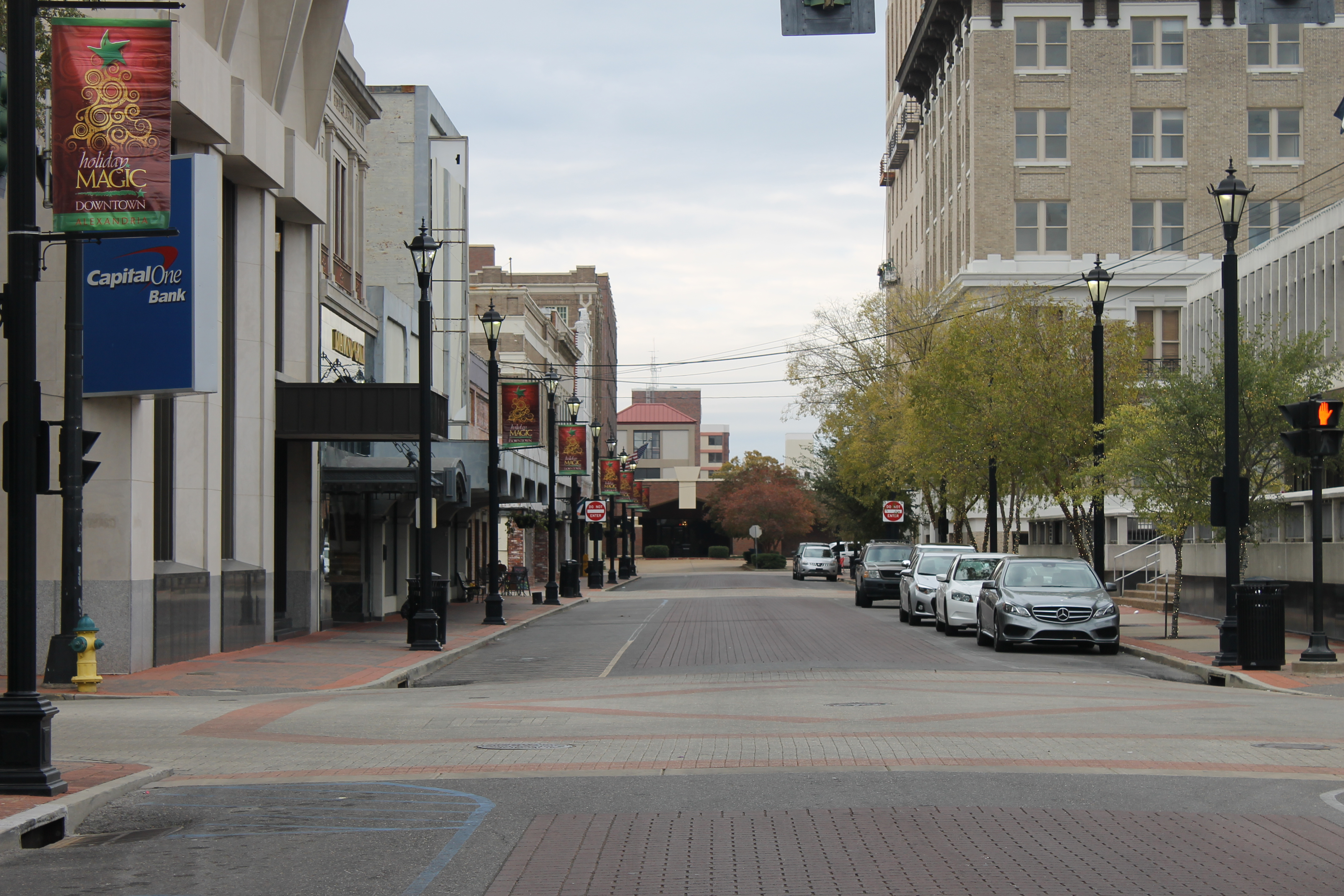
Another view of Third Street in Alexandria

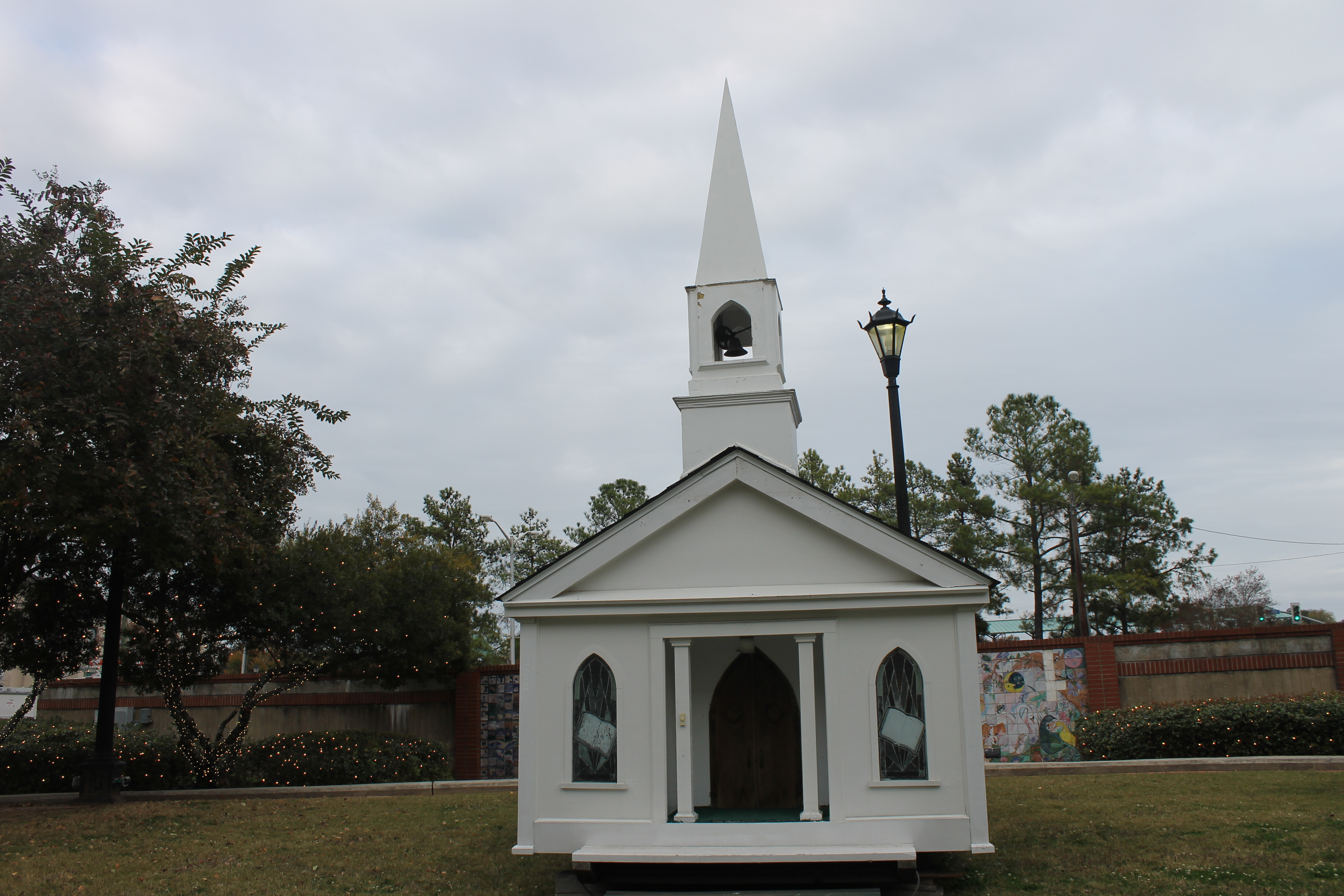
Christmas chapel is a seasonal exhibit near Alexandria City Hall.

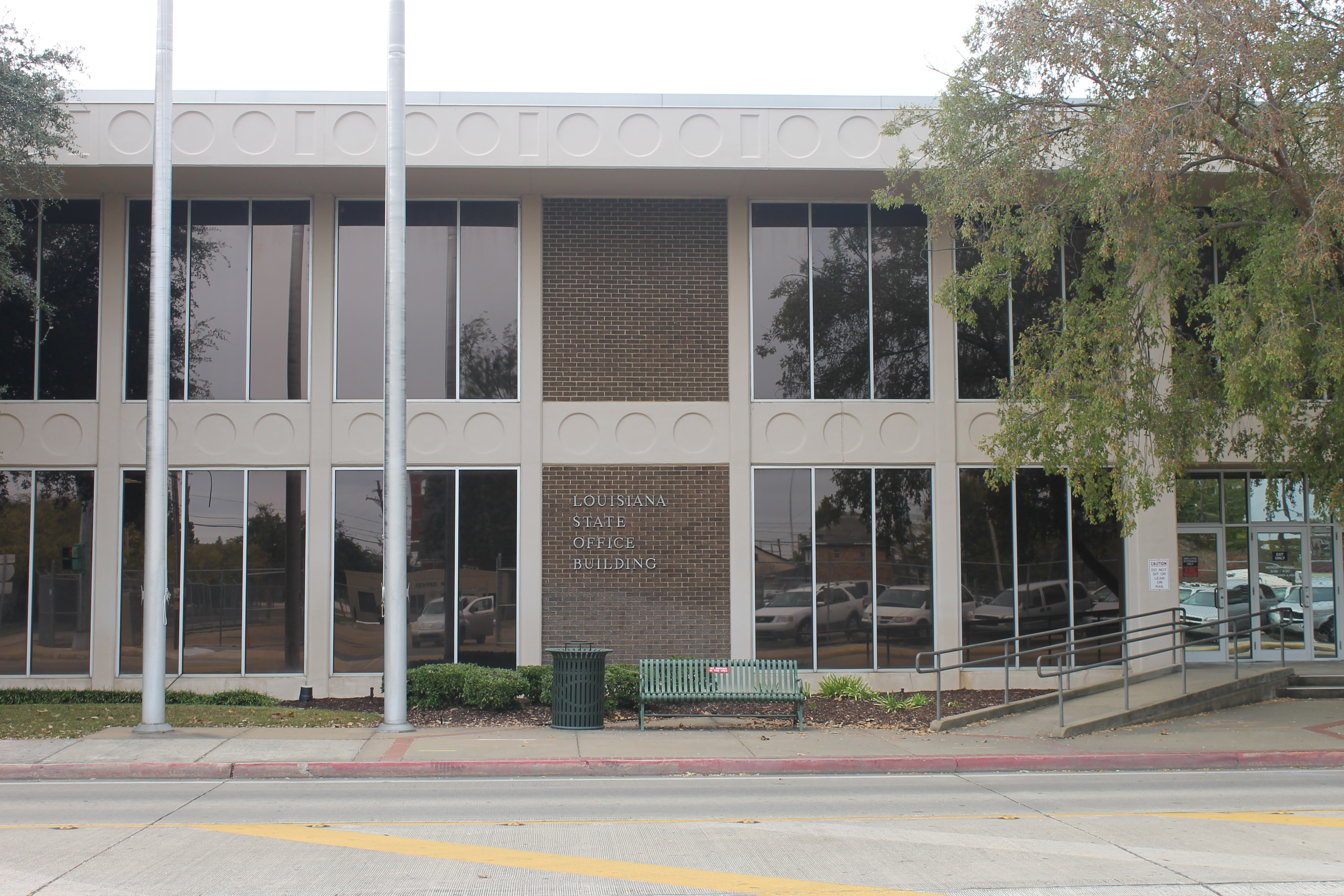
Louisiana State Office Building in Alexandria

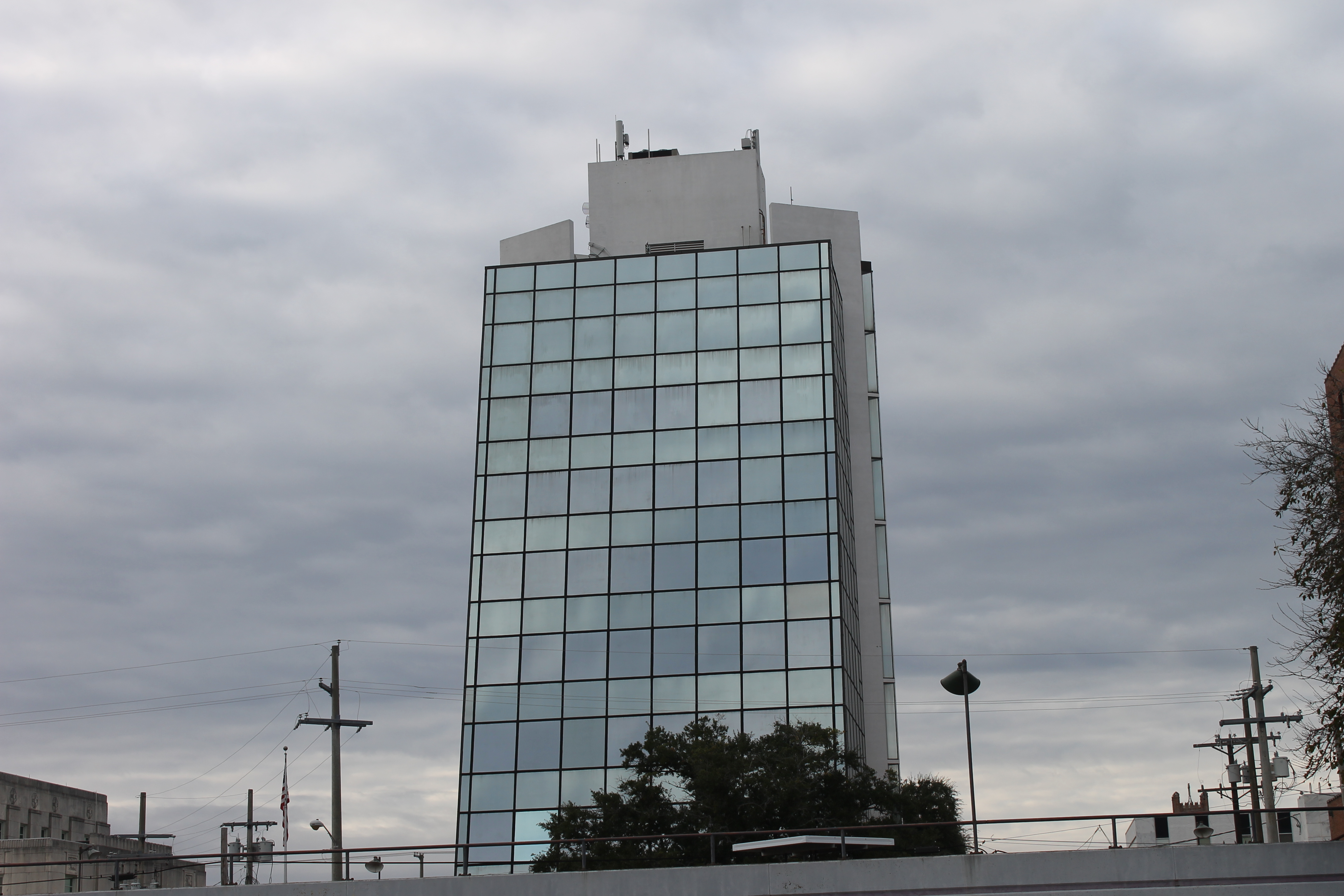
Human Services in Alexandria occupies a former financial institution building at 429 Murray Street downtown.

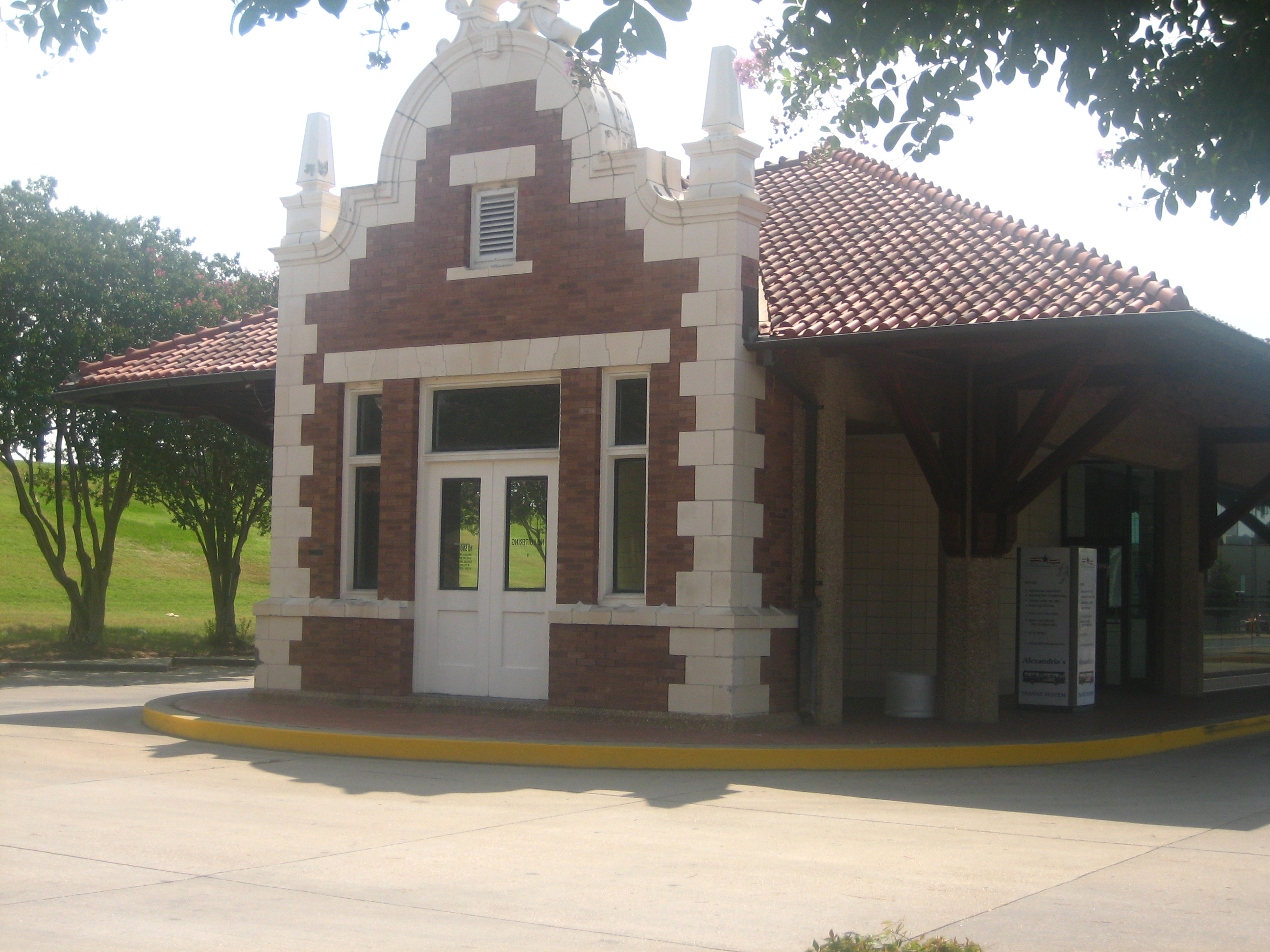
The former Missouri Pacific Railroad depot in the downtown historic district

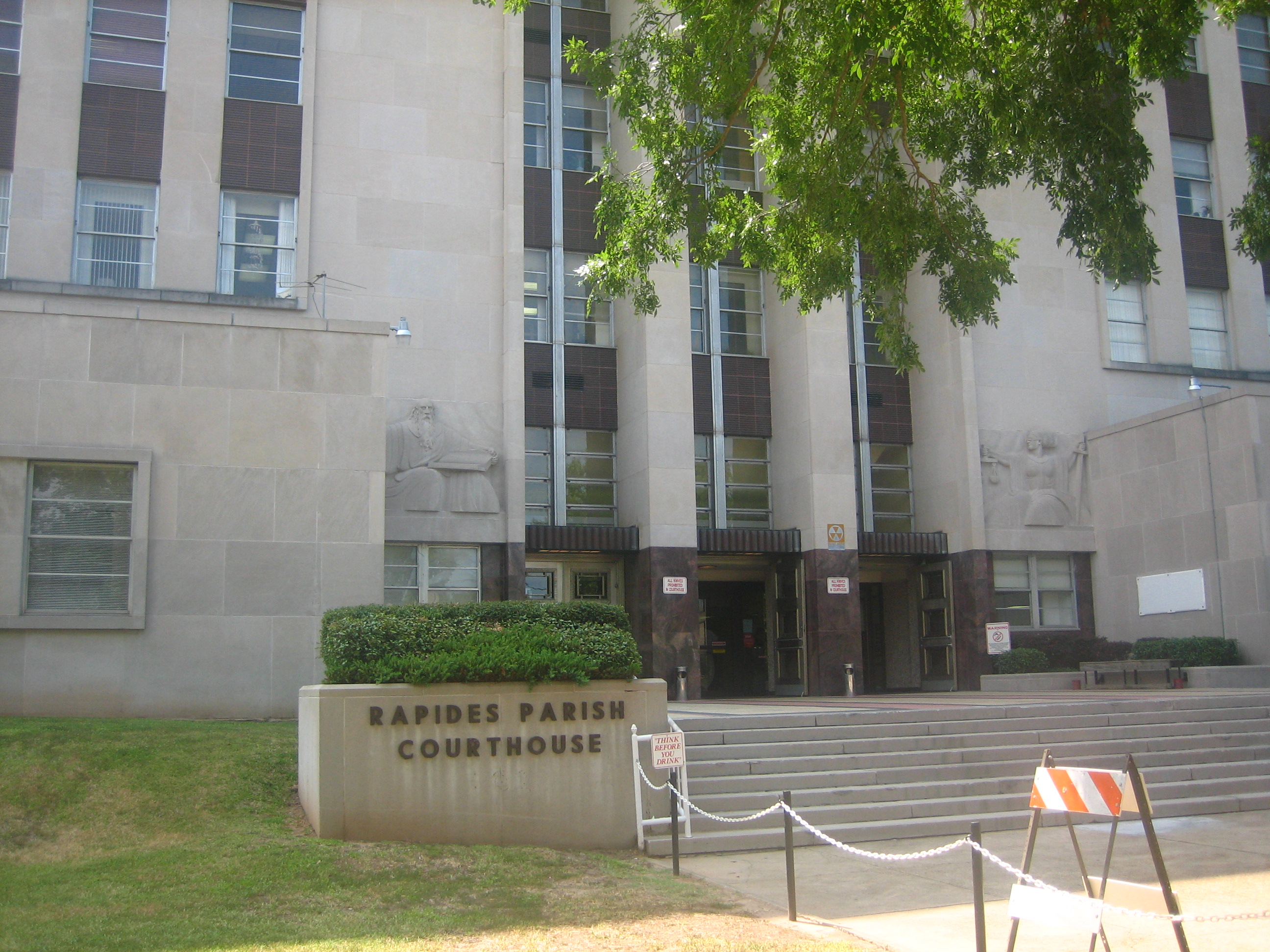
Rapides Parish Courthouse in Alexandria

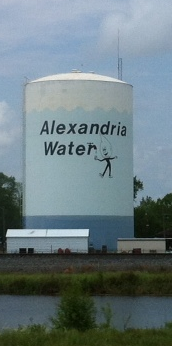
Water tower of Alexandria, LA
