= Benjamin Dawkins =

Benjamin Dawkins may refer to:

- Aussie Trump, Australian politician of the Western Australian Legislative Council
- Benjamin C. Dawkins Sr. (1881–1966), U.S. District Judge for the Western District of Louisiana, 5th Circuit, appointed by Woodrow Wilson
- Benjamin C. Dawkins Jr. (1911–1984), son of the above, and successor to the seat of U.S. District Judge, same district, appointed by President Calvin Coolidge
- Benjamin Dawkins, British person in the late 18th Century, who purchased Sadler's Mill from Henry Temple, 1st Viscount Palmerston
- Ben Dawkins (cricketer) (born 2006), English cricketer
