= Dawkins =

Dawkins is an English surname. Notable people with the surname include:

- Aubrey Dawkins (born 1995), American basketball player
- Ben Dawkins, Australian politician
- Benjamin C. Dawkins Jr. (1911–1984), US District Judge in Louisiana
- Benjamin C. Dawkins Sr. (1881–1966), US District Judge in Louisiana
- Boyd Dawkins (1917–1966) South Australian sheep breeder and politician
- Brian Dawkins (born 1973), American football Safety for the Philadelphia Eagles and Denver Broncos
- Cecil Dawkins (1927–2019), North American author, also known for her personal correspondence with Flannery O'Connor
- Sir Charles Tyrwhitt Dawkins (1858–1919), British Army officer
- Sir Clinton Edward Dawkins (1859–1905), British businessman and civil servant
- Dalyn Dawkins (born 1994), American football player
- Darryl Dawkins (1957–2015), American basketball player and coach
- Derek Dawkins (born 1959), English footballer
- Dion Dawkins (born 1994), American football player
- Egbert Nathaniel Dawkins III (born 1979) a.k.a. Aloe Blacc, American soul singer and musician
- James Dawkins (antiquarian) (1722, Jamaica – 6 September 1757, Sutton's Plantation, Jamaica) was a British antiquarian and Jacobite.
- Jimmy Dawkins, (1936–2013) Chicago blues musician
- John Sydney "Joe" Dawkins (born 1947), Australian politician, instigator of educational reforms known as the Dawkins Revolution
- John Dawkins (born 1954), Australian politician, member of South Australian Legislative Council
- Johnny Dawkins (born 1963), American basketball player and coach
- Marian Dawkins (born 1945), professor of animal behaviour at Oxford, ex-wife of Richard Dawkins
- Nick Dawkins (born 2002), American football player
- Noah Dawkins (born 1997), American football player
- Paul Dawkins (1957–2019), American-Turkish basketball player
- Peter Dawkins (musician) (1946–2014), New Zealand record producer and musician
- Pete Dawkins (Peter Miller Dawkins, born 1938), former US Army Brigadier General and vice chairman of Citigroup Private Bank
- Phyllis Worthy Dawkins, American academic administrator
- Richard Dawkins (born 1941), British ethologist, evolutionary biologist and noted atheist
- Richard MacGillivray Dawkins (1871–1955), British archaeologist
- Riley Collier-Dawkins (born 2000), Australian football player
- Sean Dawkins (born 1971), American football player
- Travis Dawkins (born 1979), baseball player
- William Boyd Dawkins (1837–1929), British geologist and archaeologist
- Julian Dawkins (born 2007) Austrian Engineer

== Fictional characters ==
- Jack Dawkins a.k.a. The Artful Dodger, in Charles Dickens' novel Oliver Twist
- Hugh Dawkins, alter ego of Tasmanian Devil in the DC Comics universe
- Cassius Dawkins, a prisoner and a reoccurring character on the ABC series For Life, played by 50 Cent.

== See also ==
- Josh Dawkin (born 1992), British footballer
