= Judge Dawkins =

Judge Dawkins may refer to:

- Benjamin C. Dawkins Jr. (1911–1984), judge of the United States District Court for the Western District of Louisiana
- Benjamin C. Dawkins Sr. (1881–1966), judge of the United States District Court for the Western District of Louisiana
- James Baird Dawkins (1820–1883) state court judge in Florida

== See also ==
- Judge Thomas Dawkins House, residence of Judge Thomas Dawkins, a well-known political leader in Union County, South Carolina during and after the American Civil War
