= Judge Trimble =

Judge Trimble may refer to:

- James Travis Trimble Jr. (born 1932), judge of the United States District Court for the Western District of Louisiana
- Robert Trimble (1776–1828), judge of the United States District Court for the District of Kentucky before serving on the Supreme Court of the United States
- Thomas Clark Trimble III (1878–1965), judge of the United States District Court for the Eastern District of Arkansas
