= Philip Lawrence =

Philip Lawrence may also refer to:

- Philip Lawrence (headmaster) (1947–1995), Irish school headmaster, gang violence murder victim
- Philip Kissick Lawrence (died 1841), U.S. federal judge
- Philip Lawrence (songwriter) (born 1974), American songwriter and producer who is part of the production team The Smeezingtons
- Philip Lawrence (politician), Canadian politician

== See also ==
- Dick Lawrence (Phillip Richard Lawrence, 1915–1960), Australian politician
