= Judge Walter =

Judge Walter (disambiguation) may refer to:

- Donald Ellsworth Walter (born 1936), judge of the United States District Court for the Western District of Louisiana
- John F. Walter (born 1944), judge of the United States District Court for the Central District of California
