= Patricia Head Minaldi =

American judge (1958–2018)

Senior Judge of the United States District Court for the Western District of Louisiana
- In office July 31, 2017 – December 1, 2018

Judge of the United States District Court for the Western District of Louisiana
- In office May 9, 2003 – July 31, 2017
- Appointed by: George W. Bush
- Preceded by: James Travis Trimble Jr.
- Succeeded by: James D. Cain Jr.

Personal details
- Born: Patricia Ann Head; September 12, 1958 Somerville, Massachusetts, U.S.
- Died: December 1, 2018 (aged 60) Lake Charles, Louisiana, U.S.
- Education: Wesleyan University (BA); Tulane University Law School (JD)

Patricia Minaldi (née Head; September 12, 1958 – December 1, 2018) was a United States district judge of the United States District Court for the Western District of Louisiana.

== Education and career ==
Born in Somerville, Massachusetts to John and Florence Head, Patricia Minaldi graduated from Wesleyan University with her Bachelor of Arts degree in 1980 and later from Tulane University School of Law with a Juris Doctor in 1983. Following law school graduation, Minaldi was an assistant district attorney of New Orleans from 1983 to 1986. She was an assistant district attorney of Calcasieu Parish, Louisiana from 1986 to 1996. She was a judge on the 14th Judicial District Court, Louisiana from 1996 to 2003.

== Federal judicial service ==
Minaldi was nominated to the United States District Court for the Western District of Louisiana by President George W. Bush on January 15, 2003. The seat had been vacated by Judge James Travis Trimble Jr., who took senior status. Minaldi was confirmed by the United States Senate on May 6, 2003, and received her commission on May 9, 2003. She assumed inactive senior status on July 31, 2017, due to a certified disability, no longer hearing cases or participating in the business of the court. She was found dead in her Lake Charles, Louisiana home on December 1, 2018, of apparent natural causes.

== DWI conviction ==
In 2014, Minaldi was arrested by Lake Charles, Louisiana police for having an open alcoholic beverage inside her vehicle. Following a police investigation, Minaldi was charged with first-offense driving while intoxicated (DWI). Minaldi subsequently pleaded guilty and accepted responsibility in court; she received a deferred sentence and was fined $400, among other penalties.

== Notable cases ==
In February 2016, during voir dire in a criminal trial, Minaldi failed to determine if jurors were qualified citizens and failed to deliver any preliminary instructions. At one point, she stopped the questioning of a witness discussing a computer application because she was ignorant of what a "drop-down menu" was. After the public defender made a motion for curative measures, Minaldi ordered the prosecutor to deliver preliminary instructions to the jury, stopping to complain to the prosecutor, "I have no idea what’s going on here. Get your act together." After the prosecutor and public defender jointly moved for a mistrial, the chief district judge removed Minaldi from the case and assigned it to Judge Donald Ellsworth Walter, who then declared a mistrial.

== Indefinite medical leave ==
In January 2017, the Clerk of the Western District of Louisiana confirmed that Minaldi had surrendered her entire docket of cases and had taken medical leave for treatment for alcoholism so severe that a colleague asked a court to rule she could not take care of herself. It is not known on exactly what date she left. Her leave ended when she took inactive senior status on July 31, 2017.

== Sources ==
Legal offices
Preceded by James Travis Trimble Jr.	Judge of the United States District Court for the Western District of Louisiana; 2003–2017	Succeeded by James D. Cain Jr.
