= Alexander Van Hook =

American judge (born 1970)

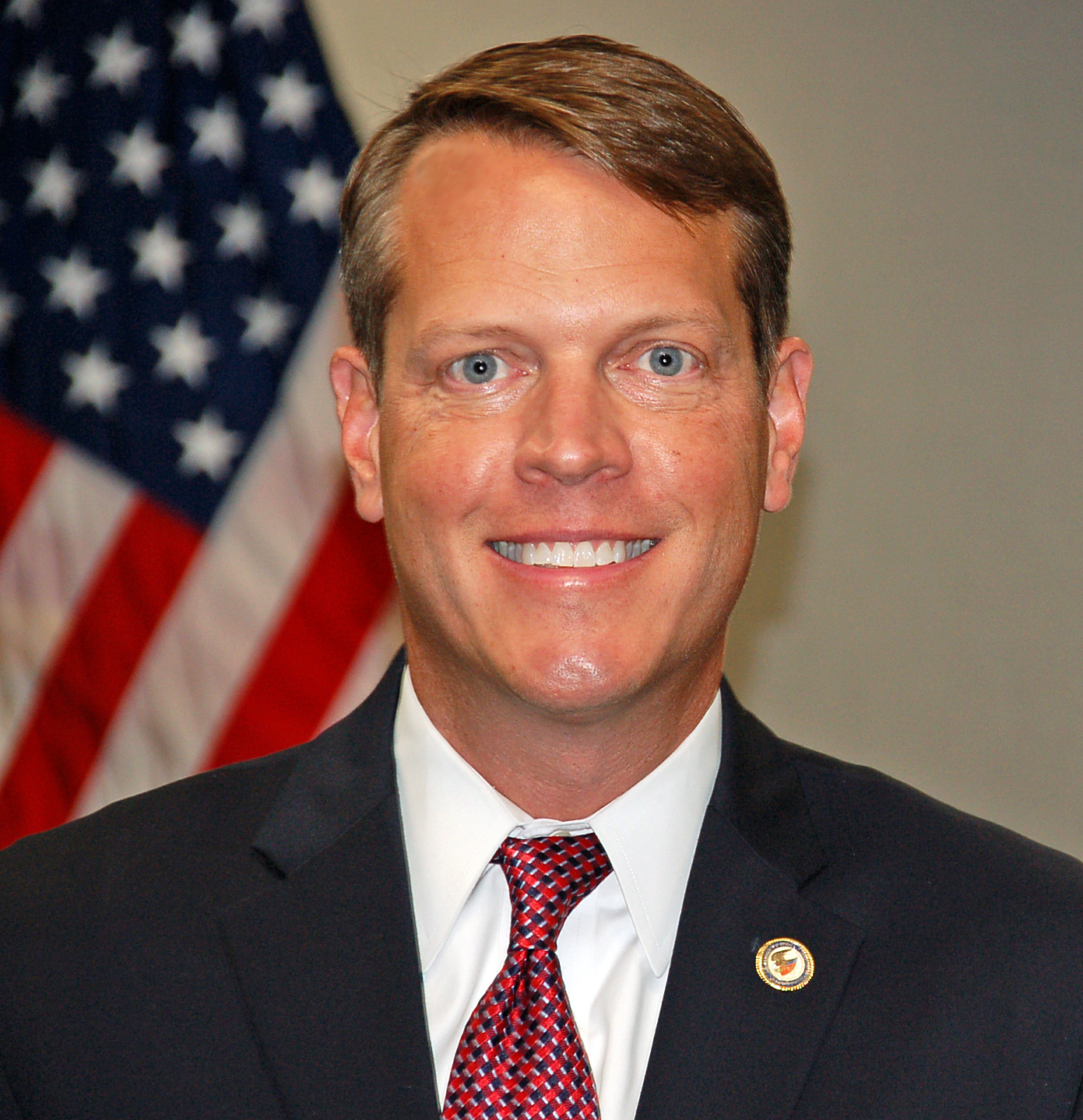

Judge of the United States District Court for the Western District of Louisiana
- Incumbent
- Assumed office January 12, 2026
- Appointed by: Donald Trump
- Preceded by: Elizabeth Erny Foote

Personal details
- Born: 1970 (age 55–56) Shreveport, Louisiana, U.S.
- Education: Centenary College of Louisiana (BA); Louisiana State University (JD)

Alexander Coker Van Hook (born 1970) is an American lawyer who has served as a United States district judge of the United States District Court for the Western District of Louisiana since 2026. He previously served as acting United States attorney for the Western District of Louisiana from January 2025 to September 2025.

== Early life and education ==
Van Hook was born in 1970, in Shreveport, Louisiana. After starting at Louisiana State University, Van Hook received his Bachelor of Arts degree in 1993 from the Centenary College of Louisiana. He received his Juris Doctor, Order of the Coif, in 1997 from the Paul M. Hebert Law Center at Louisiana State University.

In the first years of his career, Van Hook served as a law clerk for judges and Executive Branch officers in Louisiana: in the Office of Executive Counsel for Louisiana Governor Mike Foster (American politician) from 1996 to 1997; for Judge Henry Anthony Politz of the United States Court of Appeals for the Fifth Circuit from 1997 to 1998 and for Judge Tom Stagg (judge) of the United States District Court for the Western District of Louisiana from 1998 to 1999.

== Career ==
Van Hook served in the United States Attorney's Office for the Western District of Louisiana from 1999 to September 2025. There, he held an array of positions along the years: assistant United States attorney, from 1999 to 2007; deputy criminal chief from 2007 to 2010; first assistant United States attorney from 2010 to 2017, 2018 to 2020, 2021 to 2022, and 2024 to September 2025; Acting United States attorney from 2017 to 2018, 2020 to 2021, and January to September 2025, and special counsel to the United States attorney from 2022 to 2024.

=== Federal judicial service ===
On October 20, 2025, President Donald Trump announced his intention to nominate Van Hook to an unspecified seat on the United States District Court for the Western District of Louisiana. On October 21, 2025, President Trump formally transmitted the nomination to the United States Senate, to the seat vacated by Judge Elizabeth Erny Foote. On October 22, 2025, the U.S. Senate Judiciary Committee held a hearing on his nomination. On November 20, the committee voted to report his nomination to the Senate by a 16–6 vote. On December 18, the Senate voted to invoke cloture on his nomination by a 60–35 vote. On January 8, 2026, his nomination was confirmed by a 53–40 vote. He received his judicial commission on January 12, 2026.

Legal offices
Preceded by Elizabeth Erny Foote	Judge of the United States District Court for the Western District of Louisiana; 2026–present	Incumbent
