= Stephanie A. Finley =

American attorney (born 1966)

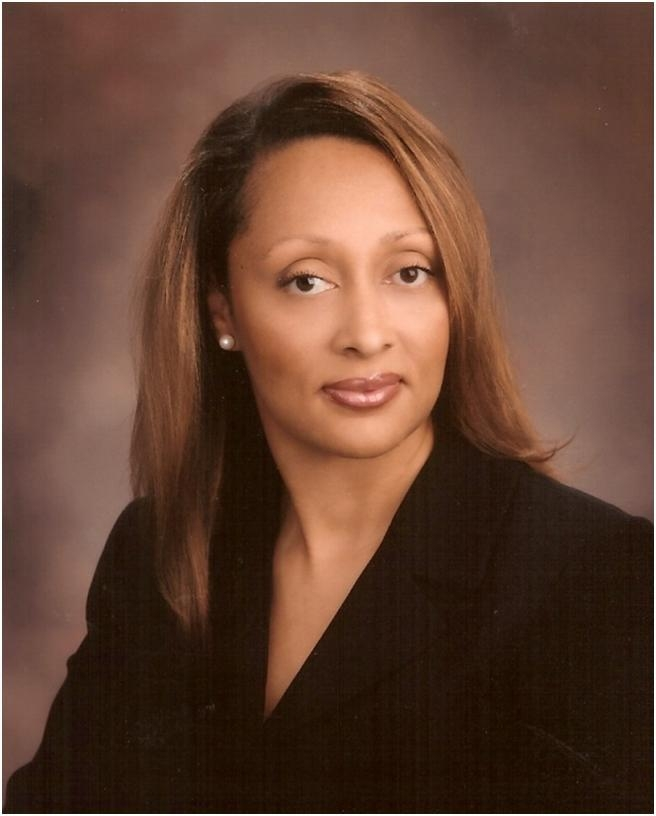
- United States Attorney Official Portrait

United States Attorney for the Western District of Louisiana
- In office June 2, 2010 – March 10, 2017
- President: Barack Obama; Donald Trump
- Succeeded by: David C. Joseph

Personal details
- Born: 1966 (age 59–60) Pineville, Louisiana, U.S.
- Education: Grambling State University (BS); Southern University Law Center (JD)
- Profession: Attorney

Military service
- Allegiance: United States
- Branch/service: United States Air Force
- Years of service: 1991–present
- Rank: Lieutenant colonel
- Unit: United States Air Force Reserves

Stephanie Ann Finley (born 1966) is the former United States Attorney for the Western District of Louisiana and is a former nominee to be a United States district judge of the United States District Court for the Western District of Louisiana.

== Biography ==
Finley was born in 1966, in Pineville, Louisiana. She received a Bachelor of Science degree, magna cum laude, in 1988 from Grambling State University. She received a Juris Doctor, cum laude, from Southern University Law Center. She began her legal career serving on active duty as an assistant staff judge advocate for the United States Air Force, from 1991 to 1995. Since 1995, she has served as an assistant staff judge advocate for the United States Air Force Reserves, currently holding the rank of lieutenant colonel. From 1995 to 2010, Finley served as an Assistant United States Attorney for the Western District of Louisiana. She served as acting deputy criminal chief from 2008 to 2009 and senior litigation counsel from 2007 to 2010. From June 2, 2010 to March 10, 2017 she served as the United States Attorney for the Western District of Louisiana, in Lafayette, Louisiana. Finley was the first woman to serve in this position.

== Expired nomination to district court ==
On February 4, 2016, President Obama nominated Finley to serve as a United States District Judge of the United States District Court for the Western District of Louisiana, to the seat vacated by Judge Richard T. Haik, who took senior status on March 6, 2015. On May 18, 2016, the Judiciary Committee held a hearing on her nomination. On June 16, 2016, her nomination was reported out of committee by voice vote. Her nomination expired on January 3, 2017, with the end of the 114th Congress.

== See also ==
- 2017 dismissal of U.S. attorneys
