= United States District Court for the Western District of Louisiana =

United States federal district court in Louisiana

- (W.D. La.)
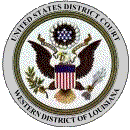

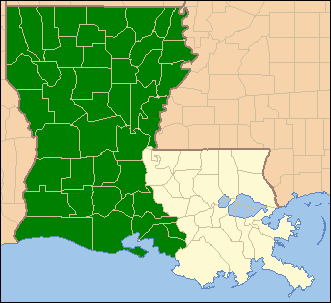
- Location: Shreveport More locations: United States Post Office and Courthouse (Alexandria); Lafayette; Lake Charles; Monroe; Opelousas
- Appeals to: Fifth Circuit
- Established: March 3, 1881
- Judges: 7
- Chief Judge: Terry A. Doughty

Officers of the court
- U.S. Attorney: Zachary Keller
- www.lawd.uscourts.gov

The United States District Court for the Western District of Louisiana (in case citations, W.D. La.) is a United States federal court with jurisdiction over approximately two thirds of the state of Louisiana, with courts in Alexandria, Lafayette, Lake Charles, Monroe, and Shreveport. These cities comprise the Western District of Louisiana.

Appeals from the Western District of Louisiana are taken to the United States Court of Appeals for the Fifth Circuit (except for patent claims and claims against the U.S. government under the Tucker Act, which are appealed to the Federal Circuit).

== Jurisdiction ==
The parishes that fall under the jurisdiction of this district court are:

- Acadia Parish
- Allen Parish
- Avoyelles Parish
- Beauregard Parish
- Bienville Parish
- Bossier Parish
- Caddo Parish
- Calcasieu Parish
- Caldwell Parish
- Cameron Parish
- Catahoula Parish
- Claiborne Parish
- Concordia Parish
- DeSoto Parish
- East Carroll Parish
- Evangeline Parish
- Franklin Parish
- Grant Parish
- Iberia Parish
- Jackson Parish
- Jefferson Davis Parish
- Lafayette Parish
- LaSalle Parish
- Lincoln Parish
- Madison Parish
- Morehouse Parish
- Natchitoches Parish
- Ouachita Parish
- Rapides Parish
- Red River Parish
- Richland Parish
- Sabine Parish
- Saint Landry Parish
- Saint Martin Parish
- Saint Mary Parish
- Tensas Parish
- Union Parish
- Vermilion Parish
- Vernon Parish
- Webster Parish
- West Carroll Parish
- Winn Parish

== History ==
On March 26, 1804, Congress organized the Territory of Orleans and created the United States District Court for the District of Orleans – the only time Congress provided a territory with a district court equal in its authority and jurisdiction to those of the states. The United States District Court for the District of Louisiana was established on April 8, 1812, by 2 Stat. 701, several weeks before Louisiana was formally admitted as a state of the union. The District was thereafter subdivided and reformed several times. It was first subdivided into Eastern and Western Districts on March 3, 1823, by 3 Stat. 774.

On February 13, 1845, Louisiana was reorganized into a single District with one judgeship, by 5 Stat. 722, but was again divided into Eastern and the Western Districts on March 3, 1849, by 9 Stat. 401. Congress again abolished the Western District of Louisiana and reorganized Louisiana as a single judicial district on July 27, 1866, by 14 Stat. 300. On March 3, 1881, by 21 Stat. 507, Louisiana was for a third time divided into Eastern and the Western Districts, with one judgeship authorized for each. The Middle District was formed from portions of those two Districts on December 18, 1971, by 85 Stat. 741.

== Current judges ==
As of January 12, 2026:

#	Title	Judge	Duty station	Born	Term of service			Appointed by
#	Title	Judge	Duty station	Born	Active	Chief	Senior	Appointed by
31	Chief Judge	Terry A. Doughty	Monroe	1959	2018–present	2022–present	—	Trump
29	District Judge	S. Maurice Hicks Jr.	Shreveport	1952	2003–present	2017–2022	—	G.W. Bush
32	District Judge	Robert R. Summerhays	Lafayette	1965	2018–present	—	—	Trump
34	District Judge	James D. Cain Jr.	Lake Charles	1964	2019–present	—	—	Trump
35	District Judge	David C. Joseph	Lafayette	1977	2020–present	—	—	Trump
36	District Judge	Jerry Edwards Jr.	Alexandria	1979	2023–present	—	—	Biden
37	District Judge	Alexander Van Hook	Shreveport	1970	2026–present	—	—	Trump
21	Senior Judge	Donald Ellsworth Walter	Shreveport	1936	1985–2001	—	2001–present	Reagan
23	Senior Judge	James Travis Trimble Jr.	inactive	1932	1991–2002	—	2002–present	G.H.W. Bush
25	Senior Judge	Tucker L. Melancon	Lafayette	1946	1994–2009	—	2009–present	Clinton
26	Senior Judge	Robert G. James	Monroe	1946	1998–2016	2009–2012	2016–present	Clinton
27	Senior Judge	Dee D. Drell	Alexandria	1947	2003–2017	2012–2017	2017–present	G.W. Bush
30	Senior Judge	Elizabeth Erny Foote	Shreveport	1953	2010–2022	—	2022–present	Obama

== Former judges ==
#	Judge	Born–died	Active service	Chief Judge	Senior status	Appointed by	Reason for termination
1	John Dick	1788–1824	1823–1824 (Note: Reassigned from the District of Louisiana. Jointly appointed to both the Eastern and the Western Districts of Louisiana.)	—	—	Monroe/Operation of law	death
2	Thomas B. Robertson	1779–1828	1824–1828 (Note: Jointly appointed to both the Eastern and the Western Districts of Louisiana.)	—	—	Monroe	death
3	Samuel Hadden Harper	1783–1837	1829–1837	—	—	Jackson	death
4	Philip Kissick Lawrence	c.1793–1841	1837–1841	—	—	Van Buren	death
5	Theodore Howard McCaleb	1810–1864	1841–1845	—	—	Tyler	reassignment
6	Henry Boyce	1797–1873	1849–1861 (Note: Recess appointment; formally nominated on December 21, 1849, confirmed by the United States Senate on August 2, 1850, and received commission the same day.)	—	—	Taylor (Note: Judge Boyce was given a recess appointment by President Taylor.); Fillmore (Note: Judge Boyce was nominated by President Taylor but was appointed to the Court by (i.e., received his commission from) President Fillmore.)	resignation
7	Alexander Boarman	1839–1916	1881–1916	—	—	Garfield	death
8	George W. Jack	1875–1924	1917–1924	—	—	Wilson	death
9	Benjamin C. Dawkins Sr.	1881–1966	1924–1953	1948–1953	1953–1966	Coolidge	death
10	Gaston Louis Noel Porterie	1885–1953	1939–1953	—	—	F. Roosevelt	death
11	Benjamin C. Dawkins Jr.	1911–1984	1953–1973	1953–1973	1973–1984	Eisenhower	death
12	Edwin F. Hunter	1911–2002	1953–1976 (Note: Recess appointment; formally nominated on January 11, 1954, confirmed by the Senate on February 9, 1954, and received commission on February 10, 1954.)	1973–1976	1976–2002	Eisenhower	death
13	Richard Johnson Putnam	1913–2002	1961–1975	—	1975–2002	Kennedy	death
14	Nauman Scott	1916–2001	1970–1984	1976–1984	1984–2001	Nixon	death
15	Tom Stagg	1923–2015	1974–1992	1984–1991	1992–2015	Nixon	death
16	W. Eugene Davis	1936–present	1976–1983	—	—	Ford	elevation
17	Earl Ernest Veron	1922–1990	1977–1990	—	1990	Carter	death
18	John Malach Shaw	1931–1999	1979–1996	1991–1996	1996–1999	Carter	death
19	John M. Duhé Jr.	1933–2025	1984–1988	—	—	Reagan	elevation
20	F. A. Little Jr.	1936–2024	1984–2002	1996–2002	2002–2006	Reagan	retirement
22	Richard T. Haik	1950–present	1991–2015	2002–2009	2015–2016	G.H.W. Bush	retirement
24	Rebecca F. Doherty	1952–present	1991–2020	—	2017–2020	G.H.W. Bush	retirement
28	Patricia Head Minaldi	1958–2018	2003–2017	—	2017–2018	G.W. Bush	death
33	Michael J. Juneau	1962–2023	2018–2022	—	2022–2023	Trump	death

== Chief judges ==
Chief judges have administrative responsibilities with respect to their district court. Unlike the Supreme Court, where one justice is specifically nominated to be chief, the office of chief judge rotates among the district court judges. To be chief, a judge must have been in active service on the court for at least one year, be under the age of 65, and have not previously served as chief judge.

A vacancy is filled by the judge highest in seniority among the group of qualified judges. The chief judge serves for a term of seven years, or until age 70, whichever occurs first. The age restrictions are waived if no members of the court would otherwise be qualified for the position.

When the office was created in 1948, the chief judge was the longest-serving judge who had not elected to retire, on what has since 1958 been known as senior status, or declined to serve as chief judge. After August 6, 1959, judges could not become or remain chief after turning 70 years old. The current rules have been in operation since October 1, 1982.

== Succession of seats ==
Seat 1
Seat reassigned from District of Louisiana on March 3, 1823 by 3 Stat. 774 (concurrent with Eastern District)
Dick	1823–1824
Robertson	1824–1828
Harper	1829–1837
Lawrence	1837–1841
McCaleb	1841–1845
Seat reassigned to District of Louisiana on February 13, 1845 by 5 Stat. 722

Seat 2
Seat established on March 3, 1849 by 9 Stat. 401
Boyce	1850–1861
Seat abolished on July 27, 1866 by 14 Stat. 300

Seat 3
Seat established on March 3, 1881 by 21 Stat. 507
Boarman	1881–1916
Jack	1917–1924
Dawkins, Sr.	1924–1953
Dawkins, Jr.	1953–1973
Stagg, Jr.	1974–1992
Melancon	1994–2009
Foote	2010–2022
Van Hook	2026–present

Seat 4
Seat established on May 31, 1938 by 52 Stat. 584
Porterie	1939–1953
Hunter, Jr.	1953–1976
Veron	1977–1990
Trimble, Jr.	1991–2002
Minaldi	2003–2017
Cain, Jr.	2019–present

Seat 5
Seat established on May 19, 1961 by 75 Stat. 80
Putnam	1961–1975
Davis	1976–1983
Duhé, Jr.	1984–1988
Haik	1991–2015
Juneau	2018–2022
Edwards, Jr.	2023–present

Seat 6
Seat established on June 2, 1970 by 84 Stat. 294
Scott	1970–1984
Little, Jr.	1984–2002
Drell	2003–2017
Joseph	2020–present

Seat 7
Seat established on October 20, 1978 by 92 Stat. 1629
Shaw	1979–1996
James	1998–2016
Doughty	2018–present

Seat 8
Seat established on July 10, 1984 by 98 Stat. 333
Walter	1985–2001
Hicks, Jr.	2003–present

Seat 9
Seat established on December 1, 1990 by 104 Stat. 5089
Doherty	1991–2017
Summerhays	2018–present

== U.S. attorneys ==
The complete list of United States attorneys in Louisiana, including those who served during territorial status:

- James Brown (1805–1808)
- Philip Grymes (1808–1810)
- Tully Robinson (1810–1811)
- John Randolph Grymes (1811–1814)
- Tully Robinson (2) (1814)
- John Dick (1814–1821)
- John W. Smith (1821–1823)
- John Brownson (1823–1830)
- Benjamin F. Linton (1830–1841)
- Henderson Taylor (1841–1842)
- Caleb L. Swayze (1842–1849)
- Henry Boyce (1849–1850)
- Lawrence P. Crain (1850–1853)
- Joseph H. Kilpatrick (1853–1854)
- Peter Alexander (1854–1856)
- Claiborne C. Briscoe (1856)
- Floyd Walton (1856–1860)
- Leon D. Marks (1860)
- James R. Beckwith (1870)
- H. B. Talliaferro (1881)
- Milton C. Elstner (1881–1885)
- Montfort S. Jones (1885–1889)
- Milton C. Elstner (2) (1889–1893)
- Charles W. Seals (1893–1898)
- Milton C. Elstner (3) (1898–1910)
- Edward H. Randolph (1910–1913)
- George W. Jack (1913–1917)
- Robert A. Hunter (1917)
- Joseph Moore (1917–1921)
- Yandell Boatner (1921)
- Hugh C. Fisher (1921–1922)
- Philip H. Mecom (1922–1935)
- Benjamin F. Roberts (1935–1937)
- Harvey Fields (1937–1941)
- Malcolm Lafargue (1941–1950)
- Joseph J. Fleniken (1950)
- Harvey Locke Carey (1950)
- William J. Fleniken (1950–1953)
- Thomas Wilson (1953–1962)
- Edward L. Shaheen (1962–1969)
- Donald Ellsworth Walter (1969–1977)
- Edward L. Shaheen (2) (1977–1979)
- J. Ransdell Keene (1979–1981)
- Joseph S. Cage Jr. (1981–1993)
- Michael D. Skinner (1993–2000)
- William J. Flanagan (2000–2001)
- Donald W. Washington (2001–2010)
- William J. Flanagan (2) (2010)
- Stephanie A. Finley (2010–2017)
- Alexander Van Hook (2017–2018)
- David C. Joseph (2018–2020)
- Alexander Van Hook (2020–2021)
- Brandon B. Brown (2021–2025)
- Alexander Van Hook (acting) (2025)
- Zachary Keller (2025-)

== See also ==
- Courts of Louisiana
- List of current United States district judges
- List of United States federal courthouses in Louisiana
- United States District Court for the Eastern District of Louisiana
- United States District Court for the Middle District of Louisiana
- United States Court of Appeals for the Fifth Circuit
