= Robert G. James =

American judge (born 1946)

Robert Gillespie James

Senior Judge of the United States District Court for the Western District of Louisiana
- Incumbent
- Assumed office May 31, 2016

Chief Judge of the United States District Court for the Western District of Louisiana
- In office 2009–2012
- Preceded by: Richard T. Haik
- Succeeded by: Dee D. Drell

Judge of the United States District Court for the Western District of Louisiana
- In office August 3, 1998 – May 31, 2016
- Appointed by: Bill Clinton
- Preceded by: John Malach Shaw
- Succeeded by: Terry A. Doughty

Personal details
- Born: Robert Gillespie James; June 19, 1946 (age 79) Ruston, Louisiana, U.S.
- Education: Louisiana Tech University (BA); Paul M. Hebert Law Center (JD)

Robert Gillespie James (born June 19, 1946) is a senior United States district judge of the United States District Court for the Western District of Louisiana, and was one of the judges involved in a 2006 water rights legal case, Normal Parm v. Sheriff Mark Shumate.

== Education and career ==
Born in Ruston, Louisiana, James received a Bachelor of Arts degree from Louisiana Tech University in 1968 and a Juris Doctor from the Paul M. Hebert Law Center at Louisiana State University in 1971. He was in private practice in Ruston from 1971 to 1998, and was a business law instructor at Louisiana Tech University from 1992 to 1998. He was a judge on the Ruston City Court from 1985 to 1998.

== Federal judicial service ==
On January 27, 1998, James was nominated by President Bill Clinton to a seat on the United States District Court for the Western District of Louisiana vacated by John Malach Shaw. James was confirmed by the United States Senate on July 31, 1998, and received his commission on August 3, 1998. He served as Chief Judge from 2009 to 2012. He assumed senior status on May 31, 2016.

== Notable ruling ==
On August 29, 2006, James overruled United States Magistrate Judge James D. Kirk, who wrote that Federal law "...entitles the public to the reasonable use of navigable waters for all legitimate purposes of travel or transportation, for boating, sailing for pleasure, as well as for carrying persons or property for hire, and in any kind of watercraft the use of which is consistent with others also enjoying the right possessed in common." The holding confirmed that it was criminal trespass for boaters to enter property above the ordinary high-water mark of riparian landowners to fish or hunt without permission. Strictly interpreting Federal law, James said that "the public has no 'right to fish and hunt on the Mississippi River.'" The original case was the result of the arrests of several anglers who were fishing in Mississippi River floodwaters, which had covered the private property of the Walker Cottonwood Farm. The case shows that the public trust rights associated with navigable waterways do not extend to "flooded" areas.

Legal offices
Preceded by John Malach Shaw	Judge of the United States District Court for the Western District of Louisiana; 1998–2018	Succeeded by Terry A. Doughty
Preceded by Richard T. Haik	Chief Judge of the United States District Court for the Western District of Louisiana; 2009–2012	Succeeded by Dee D. Drell
