= Edwin F. Hunter =

American judge

Senior Judge of the United States District Court for the Western District of Louisiana
- In office February 19, 1976 – February 22, 2002

Chief Judge of the United States District Court for the Western District of Louisiana
- In office 1973–1976
- Preceded by: Benjamin C. Dawkins Jr.
- Succeeded by: Nauman Scott

Judge of the United States District Court for the Western District of Louisiana
- In office October 3, 1953 – February 19, 1976
- Appointed by: Dwight D. Eisenhower
- Preceded by: Gaston Louis Noel Porterie
- Succeeded by: Earl Ernest Veron

Louisiana State Representative
- In office 1948–1952

Personal details
- Born: Edwin Ford Hunter Jr. February 18, 1911 Alexandria, Louisiana, US
- Died: February 22, 2002 (aged 91) Lake Charles, Louisiana, US
- Education: George Washington University Law School (LL.B.)

Edwin Ford Hunter Jr. (February 18, 1911 – February 22, 2002) was a United States district judge of the United States District Court for the Western District of Louisiana.

== Early life, education and career ==
Born on February 18, 1911, in Alexandria, Louisiana, Hunter received a Bachelor of Laws in 1938 from George Washington University Law School. He entered private practice in Springhill, Louisiana from 1938 to 1941. He continued private practice in Shreveport, Louisiana from 1941 to 1942 and from 1945 to 1953. He served in the United States Navy from 1942 to 1945. He was a member of the Louisiana House of Representatives from 1948 to 1952. He was Executive Counsel to Governor Robert F. Kennon of Louisiana from 1952 to 1953.

== Federal judicial service ==
Hunter received a recess appointment from President Dwight D. Eisenhower on October 3, 1953, to a seat on the United States District Court for the Western District of Louisiana vacated by Judge Gaston Louis Noel Porterie. He was nominated to the same position by President Eisenhower on January 11, 1954. He was confirmed by the United States Senate on February 9, 1954, and received his commission the next day. He served as Chief Judge from 1973 to 1976. He assumed senior status on February 19, 1976. His service terminated on February 22, 2002, due to his death in Lake Charles, Louisiana.

== See also ==
- List of United States federal judges by longevity of service

== Sources ==
Legal offices
Preceded by Gaston Louis Noel Porterie	Judge of the United States District Court for the Western District of Louisiana; 1953–1976	Succeeded by Earl Ernest Veron
Preceded by Benjamin C. Dawkins Jr.	Chief Judge of the United States District Court for the Western District of Louisiana; 1973–1976	Succeeded by Nauman Scott
