= List of federal judges appointed by Martin Van Buren =

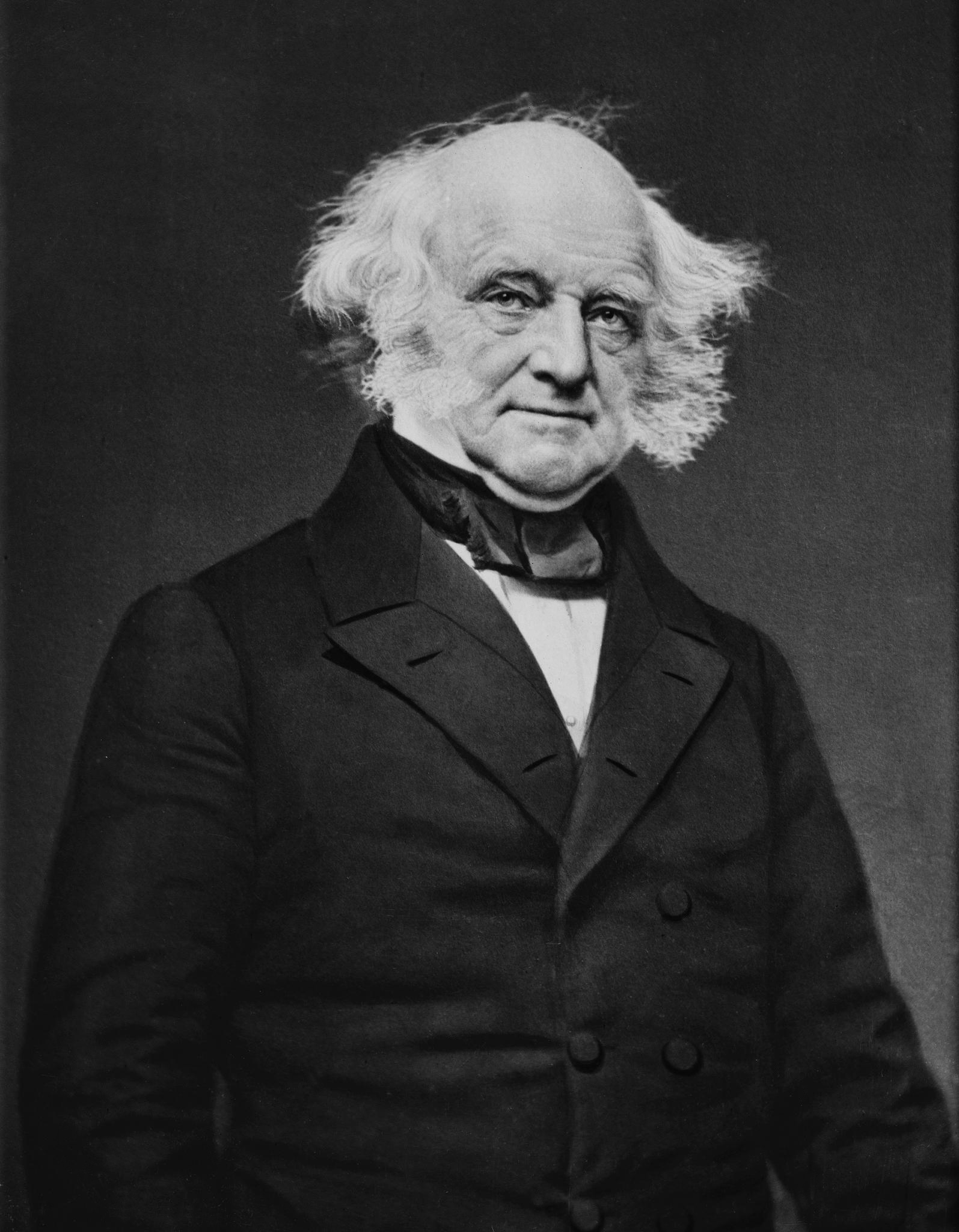
President Martin Van Buren.

Following is a list of all Article III United States federal judges appointed by President Martin Van Buren during his presidency. In total Van Buren appointed 11 Article III federal judges, including 3 Justices to the Supreme Court of the United States and 8 judges to the United States district courts.

John Catron was nominated to the United States Supreme Court by President Andrew Jackson on the final day of his presidency, March 3, 1837. The United States Senate confirmed the nomination on March 8, 1837 and President Van Buren issued his commission, and thus appointed him, the same day.

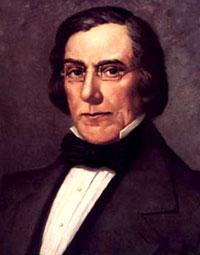
Shortly before the end of his presidency, Van Buren appointed Peter Vivian Daniel to the Supreme Court.

== United States Supreme Court justices ==
#	Justice	Seat	State	Former justice	Nomination date	Confirmation date	Began active service	Ended active service
1	John Catron (Note: Nominated by Andrew Jackson but appointed by Martin Van Buren.)	7	Tennessee	Seat established	March 3, 1837	March 8, 1837	March 8, 1837 (Note: Nominated on March 3, 1837 by Andrew Jackson, confirmed on March 8, 1837 and received commission from Martin Van Buren on March 8, 1837.)	May 30, 1865
2	John McKinley	8	Alabama	Seat established	September 18, 1837	September 25, 1837	April 22, 1837	July 19, 1852
3	Peter V. Daniel	4	Virginia	Philip P. Barbour	February 26, 1841	March 2, 1841	March 3, 1841	May 31, 1860

== District courts ==
#	Judge	Court (Note: See List of United States district and territorial courts)	Nomination date	Confirmation date	Began active service	Ended active service
1	Philip Kissick Lawrence	E.D. La. W.D. La.	September 6, 1837	September 12, 1837	September 12, 1837	March 19, 1841
2	Samuel J. Gholson	N.D. Miss. S.D. Miss.	February 9, 1839	February 13, 1839	February 13, 1839	January 10, 1861
3	Isaac S. Pennybacker	W.D. Va.	January 23, 1840	February 17, 1840	April 23, 1839	December 6, 1845
4	John Cochran Nicoll	D. Ga.	January 23, 1840	February 17, 1840	May 11, 1839	January 19, 1861
5	Robert Budd Gilchrist	D.S.C.	January 23, 1840	February 17, 1840	October 30, 1839	May 1, 1856
6	Mahlon Dickerson	D.N.J.	July 14, 1840	July 21, 1840	July 23, 1840	February 16, 1841
7	Philemon Dickerson	D.N.J.	February 22, 1841	February 27, 1841	March 2, 1841	December 10, 1862
8	John Y. Mason	E.D. Va.	February 26, 1841	March 2, 1841	March 3, 1841	March 23, 1844

== Sources ==
- Federal Judicial Center
