= Charles Herring =

American politician (1945–2024)

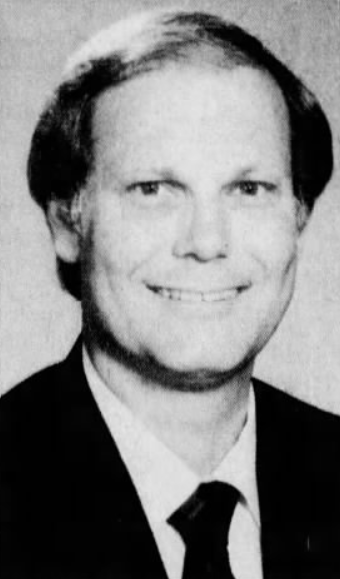
- Herring in 1988

Member of the Louisiana House of Representatives
- In office 1988–1992
- Preceded by: Jock Scott
- Succeeded by: Israel B. Curtis

Personal details
- Born: Charles Roland Herring; January 14, 1945 Alexandria, Louisiana, U.S.
- Died: November 8, 2024 (aged 79) Walker, Louisiana, U.S.
- Party: Democratic
- Education: Palmer College of Chiropractic

Charles Roland Herring (January 14, 1945 – November 8, 2024) was an American politician. A member of the Democratic Party, he served in the Louisiana House of Representatives from 1988 to 1992.

== Life and career ==
Herring was born in Alexandria, Louisiana, the son of Ellis and Lillian Harring. He attended and graduated from Palmer College of Chiropractic. After graduating, he served in the United States Navy, until his discharge in 1970. He was a chiropractor.

Herring served in the Louisiana House of Representatives from 1988 to 1992. He lost his seat in the House, in 1991, when he ran as a Democratic candidate for Louisiana state senator from the 29th district. He received 7,114 votes, but lost in the initial primary election to incumbent Joe McPherson, who won with 15,956 votes.

== Death ==
Herring died on November 8, 2024, in Walker, Louisiana, at the age of 79.
