= James D. Cain Jr. =

American judge (born 1964)

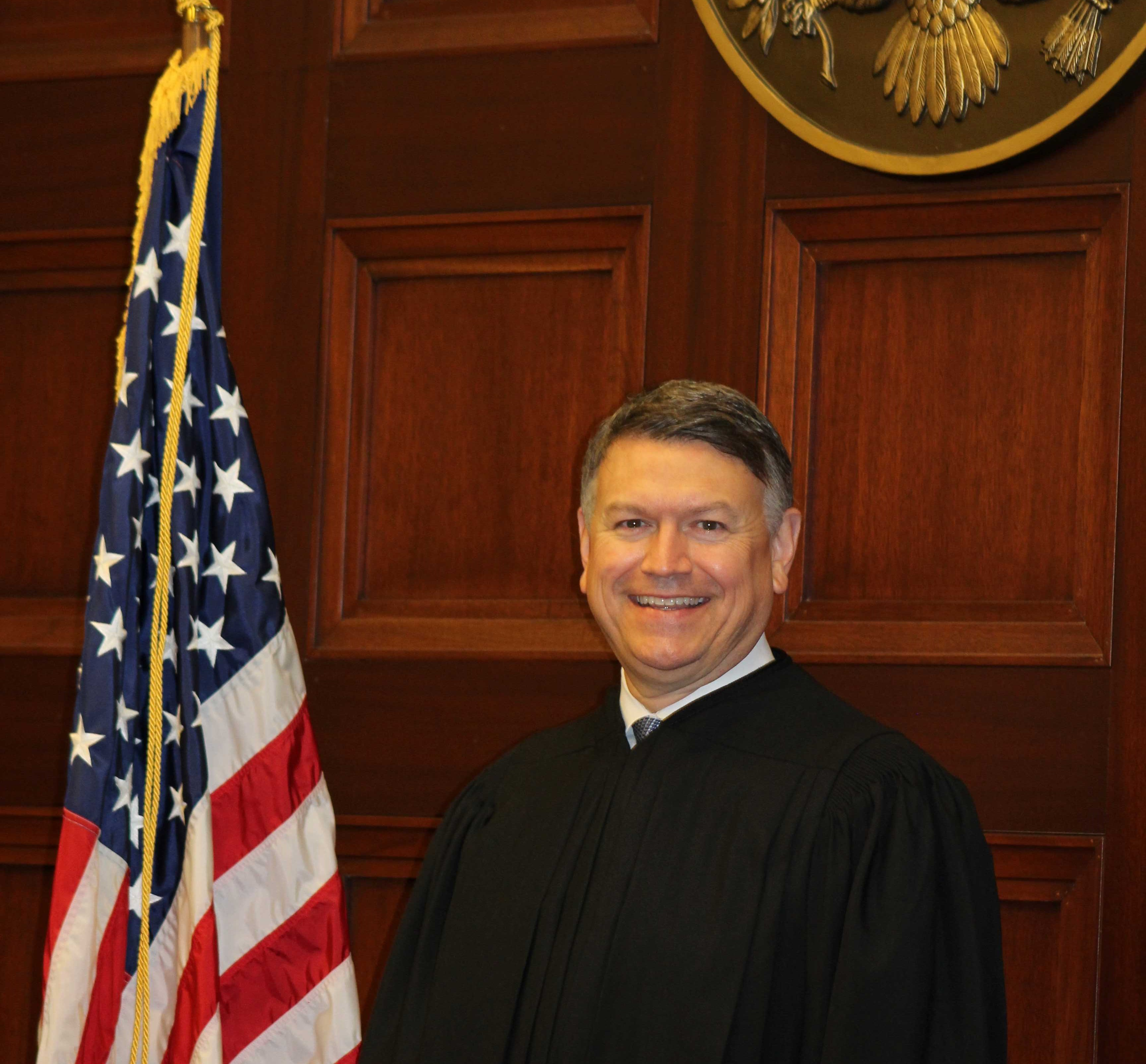

Judge of the United States District Court for the Western District of Louisiana
- Incumbent
- Assumed office June 25, 2019
- Appointed by: Donald Trump
- Preceded by: Patricia Head Minaldi

Personal details
- Born: November 30, 1964 (age 61) DeRidder, Louisiana, U.S.
- Education: McNeese State University (BA); Southern University; Law Center (JD)

James David Cain Jr. (born November 30, 1964) is a United States District Judge for the United States District Court for the Western District of Louisiana.

== Education ==
Cain earned his Bachelor of Arts from McNeese State University attending McNeese on a basketball scholarship (where he was roommates with Joe Dumars) and his Juris Doctor, cum laude, from the Southern University Law Center in Baton Rouge. Prior to entering law school, he served for three years as a congressional aide to Representative Jimmy Hayes, who served Louisiana's 7th congressional district from 1987 to 1991.

== Career ==
Upon graduation from law school, Cain clerked for Judge Henry L. Yelverton of the Louisiana Third Circuit Court of Appeal.

Before starting his own firm, he practiced for twelve years at the law firm of Lundy & Davis. He is a founding member and former partner of the Lake Charles-based firm Loftin, Cain & LeBlanc, LLC, where his practice focused on civil litigation in state and federal courts.

In 2024 McNeese State University conferred an Honorary Doctor of Humane Letters degree to McNeese alumnus the Honorable U.S. District Judge James D. Cain Jr. during the 162nd commencement ceremonies on May 10, 2024.

“This is the highest honor that the university can bestow upon an individual,” said Dr. Daryl V. Burckel, McNeese president. “Judge Cain’s [...] substantial achievements, [his] passion for service, along with [his] ardent support for McNeese State University and the state of Louisiana, clearly warrant the granting of the honorary doctorate.” Judge Cain also gave the commencement address to graduates during the ceremonies.

=== Federal judicial service ===
On August 27, 2018, President Donald Trump announced his intent to nominate Cain to serve as a United States District Judge for the United States District Court for the Western District of Louisiana. On August 28, 2018, his nomination was sent to the United States Senate. President Trump nominated Cain to the vacated judgeship held by Judge Patricia Head Minaldi, who assumed senior status on July 31, 2017. On November 13, 2018, a hearing on his nomination was held before the Senate Judiciary Committee.

On January 3, 2019, his nomination was returned to the President under Rule XXXI, Paragraph 6 of the United States Senate due to the end of the Congressional term. On January 23, 2019, President Trump announced his intent to renominate Cain for the federal judgeship. His nomination was sent to the Senate later that day. On February 7, 2019, his nomination was reported out of committee by a 20–2 vote. On June 18, 2019, the Senate invoked cloture on his nomination by a 76–20 vote. On June 19, 2019, his nomination was confirmed by a 77–21 vote. He received his judicial commission on June 25, 2019.

Between 2020 and 2023, Cain handled 6,877 insurance cases, that resulted from damage caused to homes and businesses following Hurricanes Laura and Delta, more than any other judge in the nation.

The Biden administration's actions to ban LNG exports and a pause on approving new facilities that export liquefied natural gas, was challenged by fifteen attorneys general. In July 2024, the case was brought before the U.S. District Court for the Western District of Louisiana, and Cain blocked the pause.

Legal offices
Preceded by Patricia Head Minaldi	Judge of the United States District Court for the Western District of Louisiana; 2019–present	Incumbent
