= Vicksburg, Shreveport and Pacific Railway =

US railroad

Overview
- Locale: North, Louisiana United States
- Dates of operation: 1879–1926

Technical
- Track gauge: 4 ft 8 1/2 in (1,435 mm) standard gauge
- Length: 188.448 mi (303.278 km)

The Vicksburg, Shreveport and Pacific Railway (May 1, 1901, to December 31, 1926) was chartered as the Vicksburg, Shreveport, & Texas Railroad Company with an east and west division on April 28, 1853, to be a link, via a transfer boat, between Vicksburg, Mississippi, Shreveport, Louisiana, and points west.

The line owned 188.448 miles of single-track, standard gauge track from Delta Point to Lorraine, on the Texas-Louisiana state line. The Vicksburg, Shreveport and Pacific Railway came into existence through acquisitions from foreclosures, court decisions, and reorganization, some of these were argued by the company lawyer Edward H. Randolph. The company was also known as the North Louisiana and Texas Railroad from 1868 until 1875, when the acquisition was set aside by court decision, and the railroad went into receivership. The Vicksburg, Shreveport and Pacific Railroad was chartered December 2, 1879, and ran until 1901.

== History ==
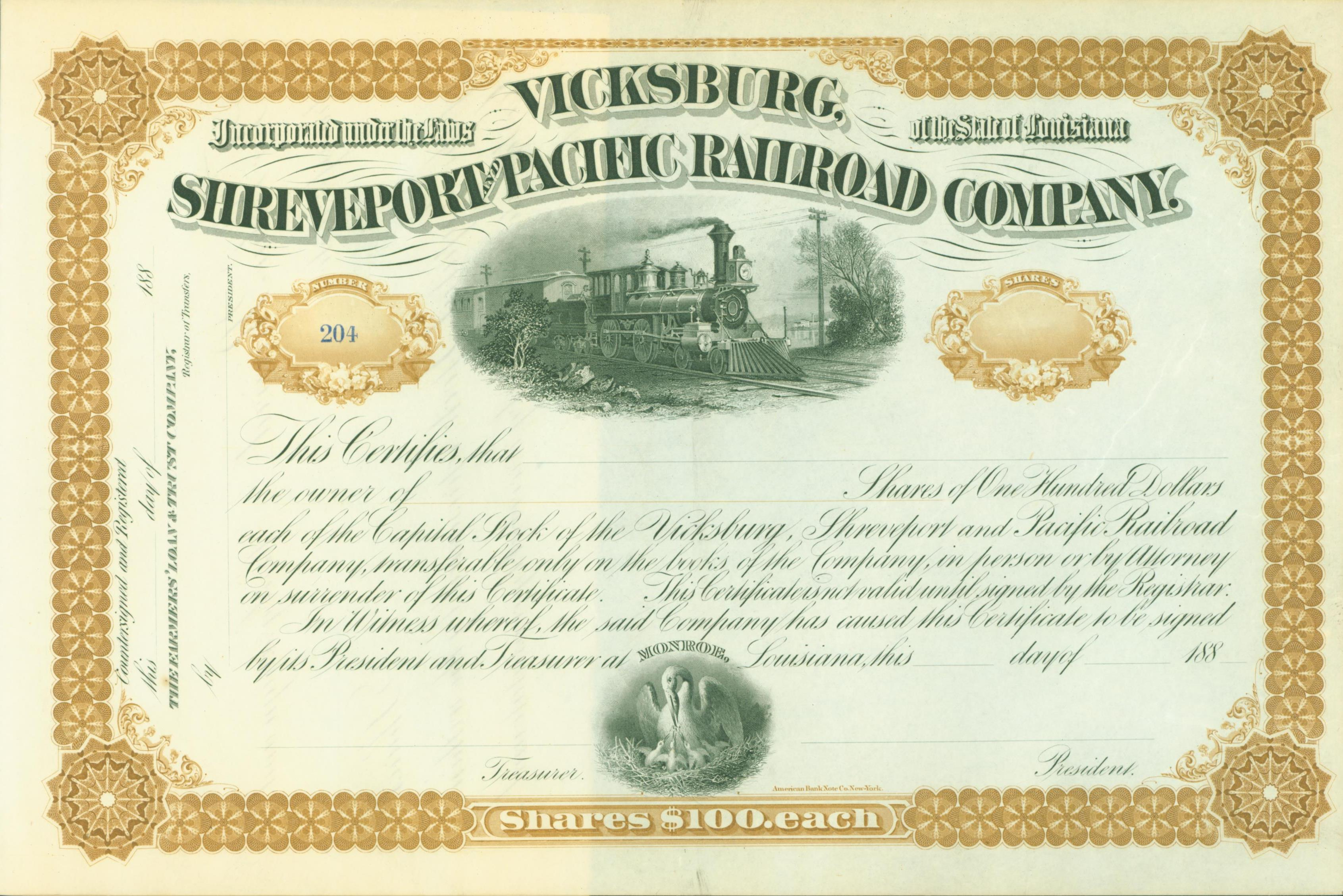
Unissued share of the Vicksburg, Shreveport and Pacific Railroad Company

The Confederate Army seized the line in 1862 and in 1863 disassembled a large portion. The Union Army took apart the entire line east of Monroe. Following the Civil War the company went into receivership on Dec. 30, 1865, into foreclosure on Feb. 5, 1866, and was purchased by the North Louisiana and Texas Railroad Company in 1868.

The Alabama, New Orleans, Texas, and Pacific Junction Railways Company, Limited, of London, England, acquired the Vicksburg, Shreveport, and Pacific Railroad in 1881 to 1882, through the Erlanger Interests of Europe. The railroad operated until 1926, when leased to Yazoo and Mississippi Valley Railroad for 365 years and merged with the Illinois Central Railroad on May 29, 1959.

At one point there were twenty-four stops between Shreveport and Delta Point but by 1967 there were only twelve depots.

=== Waskom extension ===
The tracks between Shreveport and Waskom, which was spelled Wascom in 1917 documents, was built by the Vicksburg, Shreveport, & Texas Railroad Company, and leased to the Texas and Pacific Railway in 1862. On September 12, 1882, the T&P completed their own tracks from Waskom to Shreveport.

== Rail ownership ==
- Delta Point, La. (Mississippi River Bridge) to Shreveport, La.
1. Originally Vicksburg, Shreveport & Texas Railroad (1853–1868)
2. Formerly North Louisiana & Texas Railroad (1868–1879)
3. Formerly Vicksburg, Shreveport & Pacific (1879–1926)
4. Part of Queen & Crescent Route (1889–1926)
5. Formerly Yazoo & Mississippi Valley Railroad (1926–1946)
6. Formerly Illinois Central Railroad (1926–1972)
7. Formerly Illinois Central Gulf Railroad (1972–1986)
8. Formerly Mid-South Railroad (1986–1993)
9. Formerly Kansas City Southern (1993–2023)
10. Currently Canadian Pacific Kansas City (2023– )
- Shreveport to Lorraine
1. Originally Vicksburg, Shreveport & Texas Railroad (1853–1868)
2. Formerly North Louisiana & Texas Railroad (1868–1879)
3. Formerly Vicksburg, Shreveport & Pacific (1879–1926)
4. Part of Queen & Crescent Route (1889–1926)
5. Formerly Yazoo & Mississippi Valley Railroad (1926–1946)
6. Formerly Illinois Central Railroad (1926–1950s)
7. Currently abandoned
