= F. A. Little Jr. =

American judge (1936–2024)

Frank Alan "Pappy" Little Jr.

Senior Judge of the United States District Court for the Western District of Louisiana
- In office May 30, 2002 – May 15, 2006

Chief Judge of the United States District Court for the Western District of Louisiana
- In office 1996–2002
- Preceded by: John Malach Shaw
- Succeeded by: Richard T. Haik

Judge of the United States District Court for the Western District of Louisiana
- In office October 12, 1984 – May 30, 2002
- Appointed by: Ronald Reagan
- Preceded by: Nauman Scott
- Succeeded by: Dee D. Drell

Personal details
- Born: October 26, 1936 Minneapolis, Minnesota, U.S.
- Died: March 31, 2024 (aged 87) Houston, Texas, U.S.
- Party: Republican
- Education: Tulane University (BA, JD)

Frank Alan "Pappy" Little Jr. (October 26, 1936 – March 31, 2024) was a United States district judge of the United States District Court for the Western District of Louisiana.

== Education and career ==
Born in Minneapolis, Minnesota, Little received a Bachelor of Arts degree from Tulane University in New Orleans, Louisiana in 1958. In 1961, he obtained a Juris Doctor from Tulane Law School. From 1961 to 1965, he was in private practice in New Orleans. In 1965, he moved his practice to Alexandria in Rapides Parish. He remained with the Gold, Little, Simon, Weems, and Bruser firm until he was appointed in 1984 to the federal bench.

== Federal judicial service ==
On September 11, 1984, Little was nominated to the United States District Court for the Western District of Louisiana by President Ronald Reagan to fill the position vacated by the retirement of Judge Nauman Scott, an original appointee of President Richard Nixon. Little was confirmed by the United States Senate on October 11, 1984, and received his commission the following day. He served as Chief Judge from 1996 to 2002 and then assumed senior status on May 30, 2002, serving in that status until his retirement from the bench on May 15, 2006.

While in the Western District, Little sat on some 250 cases on the United States Court of Appeals for the Fifth and Sixth circuits.

== Post judicial service ==
Upon retirement from the federal bench, Little was for nearly nine years the Chief Tribal Judge for the Coushatta Indian Tribe in Kinder, Louisiana.

Little returned to private practice in Alexandria after his judicial tenure and specializes in arbitration, mediation, and appellate review. He also lectures on the Constitution of the United States and on topics relating to taxation. Little has written for the Tulane Law Review, Tax Law Review, and Hastings Law Journal. He is also the chief judge for the Coushatta Tribe of Louisiana.

Judge Little died at the age of 87 in Houston, Texas, where he had relocated in 2022.

== Sources ==
Legal offices
Preceded by Nauman Scott	Judge of the United States District Court for the Western District of Louisiana; 1984–2002	Succeeded by Dee D. Drell
Preceded by John Malach Shaw	Chief Judge of the United States District Court for the Western District of Louisiana; 1996–2002	Succeeded by Richard T. Haik
