= Elizabeth Erny Foote =

American judge (born 1953)

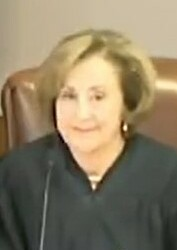
- Foote in 2017

Senior Judge of the United States District Court for the Western District of Louisiana
- Incumbent
- Assumed office January 21, 2022

Judge of the United States District Court for the Western District of Louisiana
- In office June 15, 2010 – January 21, 2022
- Appointed by: Barack Obama
- Preceded by: Tucker L. Melancon
- Succeeded by: Alexander Van Hook

Personal details
- Born: Elizabeth Frances Erny; 1953 (age 72–73) Lafayette, Louisiana, U.S.
- Relations: George M. Foote (father-in-law); William A. Culpepper (husband's uncle by marriage)
- Education: Louisiana State University (BA, JD); Duke University (MA)

Elizabeth Frances Erny Foote (born 1953) is a senior United States district judge of the United States District Court for the Western District of Louisiana.

== Early life and education ==
Born Elizabeth Frances Erny in Lafayette, Louisiana to a father who managed an insurance company and a mother who taught school, Foote moved to New Orleans at a young age. Foote earned a Bachelor of Arts degree in English literature from Louisiana State University in 1974, a Master of Arts degree in English literature from Duke University in 1975 and a Juris Doctor from Louisiana State University Paul M. Hebert Law Center in 1978.

== Career ==
Foote began her professional career working as a part-time proofreader for Franklin Press in Baton Rouge, Louisiana during the summer of 1974. She worked as a law clerk from 1976 – 1977 with the firm of McCollister, Belcher, McCleary, Fazio, Mixon, Holladay and Jones. During the latter part of 1977 and into 1978, Foote was a self-employed law clerk in Baton Rouge and then became the law clerk to the chief judge of the Louisiana Third Circuit Court of Appeal, William A. Culpepper of Alexandria, who many years later became her husband's uncle by marriage. From 1979 until 1980, Foote was an associate attorney at a Ledbetter, Percy & Stubbs in Alexandria, Louisiana. From 1980 until 1981, she was an associate attorney at the Smith Foote law firm in Alexandria; from 1981 to 2010, she was a partner at the firm, specializing in commercial corporate litigation, insurance and medical malpractice defense. Foote also served as president of the Louisiana State Bar Association in 2008 and 2009.

=== Federal judicial service ===
In February 2009, Foote wrote to Senator Mary Landrieu to discuss being considered for an upcoming vacancy on the United States District Court for the Western District of Louisiana. On February 4, 2010, President Obama nominated Foote to fill the vacancy created by the decision by Judge Tucker L. Melancon to assume senior status on February 14, 2009. Foote's nomination was reported by the United States Senate Committee on the Judiciary to the full Senate on March 18, 2010. The process of completing the nomination paperwork, Federal Bureau of Investigation investigations, coaching from the White House, and hearings before Congress took almost one year. Foote said that the FBI interviewed more than sixty-five people during the background check and this included everyone in her neighborhood and many of her clients. The United States Senate confirmed Foote in a voice vote on June 15, 2010, she received her commission the same day. She took her ceremonial oath of office on September 10, 2010 to become the third female judge of the court. Foote assumed senior status on January 21, 2022.

== Personal ==
Foote's husband, W. Ross Foote, is a retired Louisiana state judge. Her father-in-law, George M. Foote was for thirty years the Alexandria city judge. The Footes have two children.

Legal offices
Preceded by Tucker L. Melancon	Judge of the United States District Court for the Western District of Louisiana; 2010–2022	Succeeded by Alexander Van Hook
