= Gaston Louis Noel Porterie =

American judge (1885–1953)

Judge of the United States District Court for the Western District of Louisiana
- In office February 9, 1939 – March 24, 1953
- Appointed by: Franklin D. Roosevelt
- Preceded by: Seat established by 52 Stat. 584
- Succeeded by: Edwin F. Hunter

Personal details
- Born: January 22, 1885 Mansura, Louisiana, U.S.
- Died: March 24, 1953 (aged 68)
- Education: Louisiana State University (B.S.); Paul M. Hebert Law Center (LL.B.)

Gaston Louis Noel Porterie (January 22, 1885 – March 24, 1953) was a United States district judge of the United States District Court for the Western District of Louisiana.

== Education and career ==
Born in Mansura, Louisiana, Porterie received a Bachelor of Science degree from Louisiana State University in 1904 and a Bachelor of Laws from the Paul M. Hebert Law Center at Louisiana State University in 1915. He was in private practice in Marksville, Louisiana from 1915 to 1920. He was district attorney of the 14th Judicial District of Louisiana from 1916 to 1920. He was in private practice in Avoyelles Parish, Louisiana from 1920 to 1932. He was district attorney of Avoyelles Parish from 1920 to 1932. He was the Attorney General of Louisiana from 1932 to 1939.

== Federal judicial service ==
Porterie was nominated by President Franklin D. Roosevelt on January 25, 1939, to the United States District Court for the Western District of Louisiana, to a new seat created by 52 Stat. 584. He was confirmed by the United States Senate on February 1, 1939, and received his commission on February 9, 1939. Porterie served in that capacity until his death on March 24, 1953.

== Sources ==
Legal offices
Preceded by Seat established by 52 Stat. 584	Judge of the United States District Court for the Western District of Louisiana; 1939–1953	Succeeded by Edwin F. Hunter
