= Ouachita City, Louisiana =

- Unincorporated community
- Location within Louisiana Location within the United States
- Coordinates: 32°43′30″N 92°04′15″W
- Country: United States
- State: Louisiana
- Parish: Union
- Elevation: 89 ft (27 m)
- Time zone: UTC-6 (Central (CST))
  - Summer (DST): UTC-5 (CDT)
- Area code: 318
- GNIS feature ID: 555744

Ouachita City (also Ouachita or Washita) is an unincorporated community in Union Parish, Louisiana, United States.

== Notable person ==
United States District Court Judge Benjamin C. Dawkins Sr. (1881–1966) was born in Ouachita City.
