= Theodore Howard McCaleb =

American judge

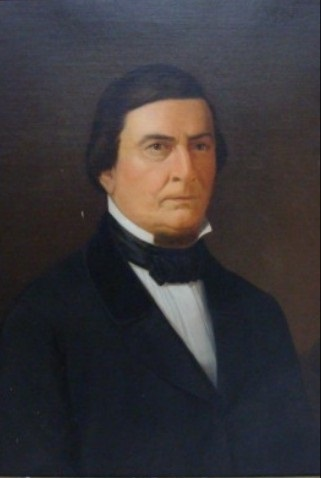

Judge of the United States District Court for the Eastern District of Louisiana
- In office March 3, 1849 – January 28, 1861
- Appointed by: operation of law
- Preceded by: Seat established by 9 Stat. 401
- Succeeded by: Edward Henry Durell

Judge of the United States District Court for the District of Louisiana
- In office February 13, 1845 – March 3, 1849
- Appointed by: operation of law
- Preceded by: Seat established by 5 Stat. 772
- Succeeded by: Seat abolished

Judge of the United States District Court for the Eastern District of Louisiana Judge of the United States District Court for the Western District of Louisiana
- In office September 3, 1841 – February 13, 1845
- Appointed by: John Tyler
- Preceded by: Philip Kissick Lawrence
- Succeeded by: Seat abolished

Personal details
- Born: February 10, 1810 Pendleton District, South Carolina
- Died: April 29, 1864 (aged 54) Claiborne County, Mississippi
- Education: Yale University read law

Theodore Howard McCaleb (February 10, 1810 – April 29, 1864) was a United States district judge of the United States District Court for the District of Louisiana, the United States District Court for the Eastern District of Louisiana and the United States District Court for the Western District of Louisiana.

== Education and career ==
Theodore Howard McCaleb was born in Pendleton District, South Carolina on February 10, 1810. He was educated at Phillips Exeter Academy, and attended Yale University, but left before graduating. He read law in 1832, and entered private practice in New Orleans, Louisiana from 1832 to 1841. He was a member of the faculty at the University of Louisiana (now Tulane University) from 1847 to 1864 serving as a professor from 1847 to 1864, and as dean of faculty from 1850 to 1862.

== Federal judicial service ==
McCaleb was nominated by President John Tyler on September 1, 1841, to a joint seat on the United States District Court for the Eastern District of Louisiana and the United States District Court for the Western District of Louisiana vacated by Judge Philip Kissick Lawrence. He was confirmed by the United States Senate on September 3, 1841, and received his commission the same day. McCaleb was reassigned by operation of law to the United States District Court for the District of Louisiana on February 13, 1845, to a new seat authorized by 5 Stat. 772. McCaleb was reassigned by operation of law to the United States District Court for the Eastern District of Louisiana on March 3, 1849, to a new seat authorized by 9 Stat. 401. His service terminated on January 28, 1861, due to his resignation.

== Later career and death ==
Following his resignation from the federal bench, McCaleb resumed private practice in New Orleans from 1861 to 1864. He died on April 29, 1864, at his plantation in Claiborne County, Mississippi.

== Sources ==
- Works by or about Theodore Howard McCaleb at the Internet Archive

Legal offices
Preceded by Philip Kissick Lawrence	Judge of the United States District Court for the Eastern District of Louisiana; Judge of the United States District Court for the Western District of Louisiana; 1841–1845	Succeeded by Seat abolished
Preceded by Seat established by 5 Stat. 772	Judge of the United States District Court for the District of Louisiana; 1845–1849	Succeeded by Seat abolished
Preceded by Seat established by 9 Stat. 401	Judge of the United States District Court for the Eastern District of Louisiana; 1849–1861	Succeeded by Edward Henry Durell
