= Samuel Hadden Harper =

American judge

Judge of the United States District Court for the Eastern District of Louisiana Judge of the United States District Court for the Western District of Louisiana
- In office March 7, 1829 – July 19, 1837
- Appointed by: Andrew Jackson
- Preceded by: Thomas B. Robertson
- Succeeded by: Philip Kissick Lawrence

Personal details
- Born: Samuel Hadden Harper; 1783 Augusta County, Virginia
- Died: July 19, 1837 (aged 53–54) Madisonville, Louisiana, U.S.

Samuel Hadden Harper (1783 – July 19, 1837) was a United States district judge of the United States District Court for the Eastern District of Louisiana and the United States District Court for the Western District of Louisiana.

== Education and career ==
Born in Augusta County, Virginia, Harper was in private practice in New Orleans, Louisiana from 1808 to 1829. He also served in the United States Army during the War of 1812 and became a lieutenant colonel. He was a member of the Louisiana House of Representatives in 1814, and was a registrar in the land office of the Eastern District of Louisiana from 1821 to 1824. In 1825, he was a clerk for the United States District Court for the Eastern District of Louisiana, and a city councilman of New Orleans.

== Federal judicial service ==
Harper was nominated by President Andrew Jackson on March 6, 1829, to a joint seat on the United States District Court for the Eastern District of Louisiana and the United States District Court for the Western District of Louisiana vacated by Judge Thomas B. Robertson. He was confirmed by the United States Senate on March 7, 1829, and received his commission the same day. His service terminated on July 19, 1837, due to his death in Madisonville, Louisiana.

== Sources ==
Legal offices
Preceded by Thomas B. Robertson	Judge of the United States District Court for the Eastern District of Louisiana; Judge of the United States District Court for the Western District of Louisiana; 1829–1837	Succeeded by Philip Kissick Lawrence
