= Robert R. Summerhays =

American judge (born 1965)

Robert Summerhays
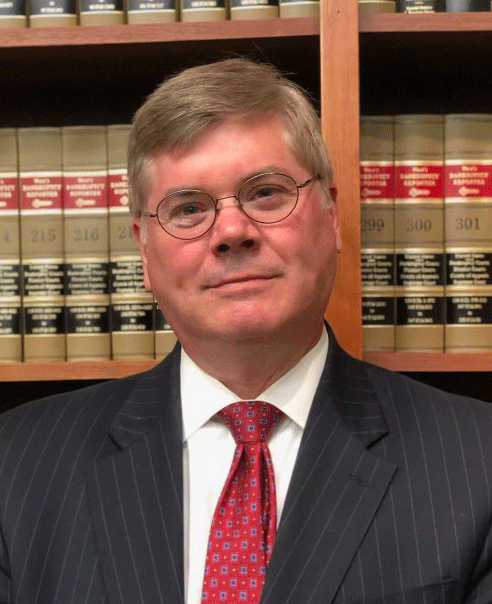
- Summerhays in 2021

Judge of the United States District Court for the Western District of Louisiana
- Incumbent
- Assumed office September 19, 2018
- Appointed by: Donald Trump
- Preceded by: Rebecca F. Doherty

Personal details
- Born: September 10, 1965 (age 59); Fort Worth, Texas, U.S.
- Education: University of Texas at Austin (BA, JD)

Robert Rees Summerhays (born September 10, 1965) is an American lawyer who serves as a United States district judge of the United States District Court for the Western District of Louisiana. He was formerly a United States bankruptcy judge of the same court.

== Education ==
Summerhays earned his Bachelor of Arts, with high honors, from the University of Texas at Austin, where he was inducted into Phi Beta Kappa, and his Juris Doctor from the University of Texas School of Law, where he graduated with high honors and was inducted into the Order of the Coif.

== Career ==
Upon graduation from law school, he served as a law clerk to Judge W. Eugene Davis of the United States Court of Appeals for the Fifth Circuit. He was a partner in the Dallas office of Weil, Gotshal & Manges before becoming a bankruptcy judge. He joined the Federalist Society in 2016.

=== Federal judicial service ===
Summerhays became a judge of the United States Bankruptcy Court for the Western District of Louisiana in 2006 and served on that court until becoming a district judge. He was chief judge of that court from 2009 to 2017.

On January 23, 2018, President Donald Trump announced his intent to nominate Summerhays to an undetermined seat on the United States District Court for the Western District of Louisiana. On January 24, 2018, his nomination was sent to the United States Senate. He was nominated to the seat vacated by Judge Rebecca F. Doherty, who assumed senior status on June 5, 2017. On April 11, 2018, a hearing on his nomination was held before the Senate Judiciary Committee. On May 10, 2018, his nomination was reported out of committee by a voice vote. On September 6, 2018, his nomination was confirmed by a voice vote. He received his judicial commission on September 19, 2018.

Legal offices
| Preceded by Rebecca F. Doherty | Judge of the United States District Court for the Western District of Louisiana; 2018–present | Incumbent |
