= Terry A. Doughty =

American judge (born 1959)

Terry Doughty
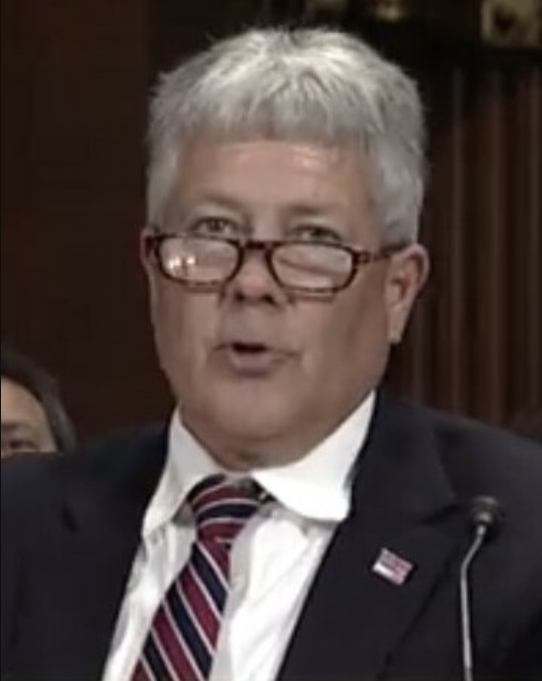

Chief Judge of the United States District Court for the Western District of Louisiana
- Incumbent
- Assumed office December 5, 2022
- Preceded by: S. Maurice Hicks Jr.

Judge of the United States District Court for the Western District of Louisiana
- Incumbent
- Assumed office March 7, 2018
- Appointed by: Donald Trump
- Preceded by: Robert G. James

Personal details
- Born: Terry Alvin Doughty; 1959 (age 66–67) Rayville, Louisiana, U.S.
- Education: Louisiana Tech University (BS); Louisiana State University (JD)

Terry Alvin Doughty (born 1959) is the chief United States district judge of the United States District Court for the Western District of Louisiana. He served as a judge on the Fifth Judicial District Court in Louisiana from 2009 to 2018.

== Early life and education ==
Doughty was born in 1959 in Rayville, Richland Parish, Louisiana. He received his Bachelor of Science in finance from Louisiana Tech University and his Juris Doctor from the Louisiana State University Law School.

== Career ==
From 1985 through 2008, Doughty served as an assistant district attorney for the Fifth Judicial District of Louisiana. During that period, he prosecuted misdemeanor and felony cases, and litigated post-conviction proceedings and juvenile cases. Before joining the district attorney's office, he practiced at the Rayville law firm of Cotton, Bolton, Hoychick & Doughty.

=== Judicial career ===
==== State judicial career ====
As a judge, Doughty presided over criminal, civil, and juvenile cases arising in the parishes of Franklin, Richland, and West Carroll. Elected in 2008 to serve as a judge of the Fifth Judicial District in Louisiana, he replaced retiring Judge Glenn W. Strong. He assumed that office on January 1, 2009 and served as chief judge from 2013 to 2014. In 2015, Doughty was reelected to the court and received the Citizen Lawyer Award from the Louisiana State Bar Association. On March 8, 2018, he retired from the state bench and was succeeded by John Hamilton.

==== Federal judicial service ====
On August 3, 2017, President Donald Trump nominated Doughty to serve as a United States District Judge of the United States District Court for the Western District of Louisiana, to the seat vacated by Judge Robert G. James, who assumed senior status on May 31, 2016. His nomination was endorsed by U.S. Representative Ralph Abraham of Louisiana's 5th congressional district, who like Doughty resides in Richland Parish, and U.S. Senators Bill Cassidy and John Neely Kennedy. Doughty was rated "well qualified" by the American Bar Association. On November 1, 2017, a hearing on his nomination was held before the Senate Judiciary Committee. On December 7, 2017, his nomination was reported out of committee by a voice vote. On March 1, 2018, the United States Senate invoked cloture on his nomination by a 94–2 vote. Doughty was confirmed on March 6, 2018, by a 98–0 vote. He received his commission on March 7, 2018. He became chief judge on December 5, 2022.

=== Notable rulings ===
On July 4, 2023, Doughty issued an injunction against the Department of Health and Human Services and the Federal Bureau of Investigation, among others, prohibiting them from asking social media companies to remove alleged misinformation, as part of a lawsuit brought by Missouri and Louisiana against the Biden administration for what the plaintiffs describe as violations of the First Amendment and federal law. On July 14, 2023, the United States Court of Appeals for the Fifth Circuit halted the order for the time being.

==== Limitations on Biden administration contact with social media firms ====
On July 4, 2023, in connection with a lawsuit filed by the Republican attorneys general of Missouri and Louisiana, Doughty ruled that the Biden administration likely violated the First Amendment in censoring negative views regarding aspects of the coronavirus pandemic on social media, placing limits on the Administration's contact with social media firms. Politico reported:

Doughty also issued a sweeping preliminary injunction barring numerous federal officials and agencies—including Surgeon General Vivek Murthy, Health and Human Services Secretary Xavier Becerra, White House press secretary Karine Jean-Pierre and all employees of the Justice Department and FBI—from having any contact with social media firms for the purpose of discouraging or removing First Amendment-protected speech.

The next day, the Department of Justice (DOJ) requested that Doughty stay his order pending appeal, which he denied; within hours, the DOJ filed a notice to appeal. Ten days later, a three-judge panel for the New Orleans–based Fifth Circuit Court of Appeals granted a request for a temporary hold on the "far-reaching preliminary injunction", while it is referred to an appeals panel that will rule on a longer-term stay of Doughty's order.

Doughty's ruling has been criticized for entailing several errors, including misquotations and misrepresentations.

==== Block on COVID-19 vaccine mandate ====
In 2021, Doughty issued a nationwide injunction against a federal mandate that healthcare workers be vaccinated against COVID-19. His opinion repeated debunked claims made by Dr. Peter McCollough, including that vaccines are not useful because booster shots are recommended after six months, that vaccines "do not prevent transmission of the disease", and that "the virus has achieved an immune escape from COVID-19 vaccines". A cardiologist, McCollough was fired from his position as vice chief of internal medicine at Baylor University Medical Center for spreading misinformation about COVID-19.

On January 1, 2022, Doughty issued an injunction on a federal mandate that would require workers at Head Start, a pre-K program, to be vaccinated against COVID-19. His ruling applied to the 24 states whose attorneys general signed on to the lawsuit.

On September 21, 2022, Doughty entered a permanent injunction against a federal vaccine and mask mandate for the Head Start program in 24 states that would have required its teachers, contractors, and volunteers to be fully vaccinated. Doughty ruled that President Joe Biden did not have constitutional authority to issue such a mandate.

==== Deportation of VML ====
Legal offices
Preceded by Robert G. James	Judge of the United States District Court for the Western District of Louisiana; 2018–present	Incumbent
Preceded by S. Maurice Hicks Jr.	Chief Judge of the United States District Court for the Western District of Louisiana; 2022–present	Incumbent
