= Albin Provosty =

American politician and lawyer

Albin Alexander Provosty

Louisiana State Senator for Avoyelles and Pointe Coupee parishes (now District 17 - Ascension, Assumption, East Baton Rouge, Iberville, Pointe Coupee, West Baton Rouge, and West Feliciana parishes)
- In office 1912–1920
- Preceded by: Martin Glynn; William H. Peterman
- Succeeded by: Albin O. Boyer; C. P. Couvillion

Personal details
- Born: July 17, 1865 Pointe Coupee Parish, Louisiana, US
- Died: April 9, 1932 (aged 66) New Orleans, Louisiana
- Party: Democratic
- Spouse: Marie Adele LeDoux Provosty
- Relations: Nauman Scott (grandson) Jock Scott (great-grandson) Olivier O. Provosty (brother)
- Children: Sidonie Provosty Scott
- Occupation: Lawyer

Albin Alexander Provosty (July 17, 1865 – April 9, 1932) was a lawyer from New Roads, Louisiana, who represented Avoyelles and his native Pointe Coupee parishes in the Louisiana State Senate from 1912 to 1920 in what is now the geographically large District 17 covering all or parts of seven parishes. He was also a district attorney and for several years the publisher of The Pointe Coupee Banner. He lived in a classic home in New Roads with his wife, the former Marie Adele LeDoux (1870-1967).

Political offices
Preceded by Martin Glynn; William H. Peterman	Louisiana State Senator for Avoyelles and Pointe Coupee parishes); Albin Alexander Provosty, I 1912–1920	Succeeded by Albin O. Boyer; C. P. Couvillion
