= Jock Scott (politician) =

American politician

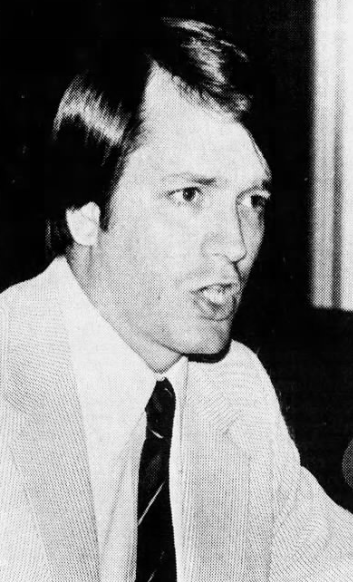
- Scott in 1980

Member of the Louisiana House of Representatives
- In office 1976–1988
- Preceded by: Ned Randolph
- Succeeded by: Charles Herring

Personal details
- Born: John Wyeth Scott II; June 29, 1947 Alexandria, Louisiana, U.S.
- Died: April 25, 2009 (aged 61) Alexandria, Louisiana, U.S.
- Party: Democratic; Republican
- Parent: Nauman Scott (father)
- Relatives: Albin Provosty (great-grandfather); Olivier O. Provosty (great-great-uncle)
- Education: Tulane University; Louisiana State University

John Wyeth Scott II (June 29, 1947 – April 25, 2009) was an American politician. A member of the Democratic Party and the Republican Party, he served in the Louisiana House of Representatives from 1976 to 1988.

== Life and career ==
Scott was born in Alexandria, Louisiana, the son of Nauman Scott, a United States federal judge, and Blanche Hammond. He was the great-grandson of Albin Provosty, a Louisiana state senator, and was the great-great-nephew of Olivier O. Provosty, an associate justice of the Louisiana Supreme Court. He attended Bolton High School, graduating in 1965. After graduating, he attended Tulane University, earning his BA degree in government in 1969, which after earning his degree, he attended Louisiana State University, studying law.

Scott served in the Louisiana House of Representatives from 1976 to 1988. He lost his seat in the House, in 1987, when he ran as a Republican candidate for Louisiana state senator from the 29th district. He received 12,346 votes, but lost to Democratic candidate Joe McPherson, who won with 16,950 votes.

== Death and legacy ==
Scott died on April 25, 2009, at his home in Alexandria, Louisiana, at the age of 61.

In 2015, Scott was posthumously inducted into the Louisiana Political Museum and Hall of Fame.
