= Olivier O. Provosty =

American judge (1852–1924)

Olivier O. Provosty (August 3, 1852 – August 3, 1924) was a justice of the Louisiana Supreme Court from March 16, 1901, to December 30, 1922, serving as chief justice from January 2, 1922, until the end of his service.

Born in Pointe Coupee Parish, Louisiana, the brother of Albin Provosty, Louisiana state senator. Provosty was educated at the Poydras Academy, Provosty was educated at the Poydras Academy, and at Georgetown University.

He was a district attorney from 1873 to 1876, and served in the Louisiana State Senate from 1888 to 1892, and as a member of the Constitutional Convention of 1898. He was a referee in bankruptcy from 1898 to 1901.

Provosty died in his home in New Orleans on his 72nd birthday. He was survived by a son and four daughters. He was the great-uncle of Nauman Scott, a United States federal judge, and was the great-great-uncle of Jock Scott, a Louisiana representative.

Political offices
Preceded by Lynn B. Watkins	Justice of the Louisiana Supreme Court; 1901–1922	Succeeded by Court reconfigured
