= Edward H. Randolph =

American politician (1858–1934)

United States Attorney for the Western District of Louisiana
- In office 1910–1913
- President: William Howard Taft
- Preceded by: Milton C. Elstner
- Succeeded by: George W. Jack

Personal details
- Born: Edward Hughes Randolph; March 12, 1858 Bossier Parish, Louisiana
- Died: February 16, 1934 (aged 75) Shreveport, Louisiana
- Spouse(s): Mary Rose Austin Randolph (married 1911; died 1919); Annie Jeffries Randolph (married ?; died 1907)

Edward Hughes Randolph (1858–1934) was an American lawyer from Louisiana who served as the United States Attorney for the Western District of Louisiana under President Taft. He was known for fighting against the draft lottery.

== Life ==
Edward Hughes Randolph was born in Bossier Parish in 1858 to Edward G. Randolph and Mary E. Thompson. He became the attorney for the Louisiana Railway and Navigation Company, Houston & Shreveport Railway and counsel for the Vicksburg, Shreveport and Pacific Railway as well as for Shreveport Traction Company. He was a member of the Louisiana State House of Representatives as a Democrat in 1884, a member of the Louisiana Democratic State Central Committee (1895–1896). However, he left the party after that year. In 1901 he was the attorney for the city of Shreveport. and in 1906 appeared before the Louisiana Supreme Court. He would become U.S. Attorney for the Western District of Louisiana in 1910 and hold that position until 1913. He was also a former president of the Louisiana Bar Association.
