= Brandon B. Brown =

American lawyer (born 1981)

Brandon Brown
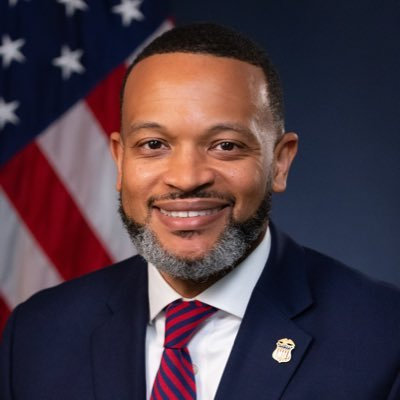

United States Attorney for the Western District of Louisiana
- In office December 10, 2021 – January 20, 2025
- President: Joe Biden
- Preceded by: David C. Joseph
- Succeeded by: Zachary Keller

Personal details
- Born: Brandon Bonaparte Brown; 1981 (age 44–45) Monroe, Louisiana, U.S.
- Education: Louisiana Tech University (BA, MBA); Southern University (JD)

Brandon Bonaparte Brown (born 1981) is an American lawyer who has served as the United States attorney for the Western District of Louisiana from 2021 to 2025.

== Education ==
Brown earned a Bachelor of Arts in 2002 and a Master of Business Administration in 2004 from Louisiana Tech University, followed by a Juris Doctor in 2007 from the Southern University Law Center.

== Career ==
From 2007 to 2012, Brown served as an assistant prosecuting attorney in the Ouachita Parish District Attorney's Office. He was also an associate at Hammonds, Sills, Adkins & Guice, LLP in Baton Rouge, Louisiana. From 2012 to 2021, he has served as an assistant United States attorney in the United States Attorney's Office for the Western District of Louisiana.

=== U.S. attorney for the Western District of Louisiana ===
On November 12, 2021, President Joe Biden announced his intent to nominate Brown to serve as the United States attorney for the Western District of Louisiana. On November 15, 2021, his nomination was sent to the United States Senate. On December 2, 2021, his nomination was reported out of committee by a voice vote. On December 7, 2021, his nomination was confirmed in the United States Senate by voice vote. He was sworn into office on December 10, 2021.

Brown resigned on January 20, 2025.

Legal offices
Preceded by Alexander C. Van Hook; Acting	United States Attorney for the Western District of Louisiana; 2021–2025	Succeeded by Zachary Keller
