= Smoke Bend, Louisiana =

Unincorporated community in Louisiana, U.S.

Smoke Bend
- Unincorporated community
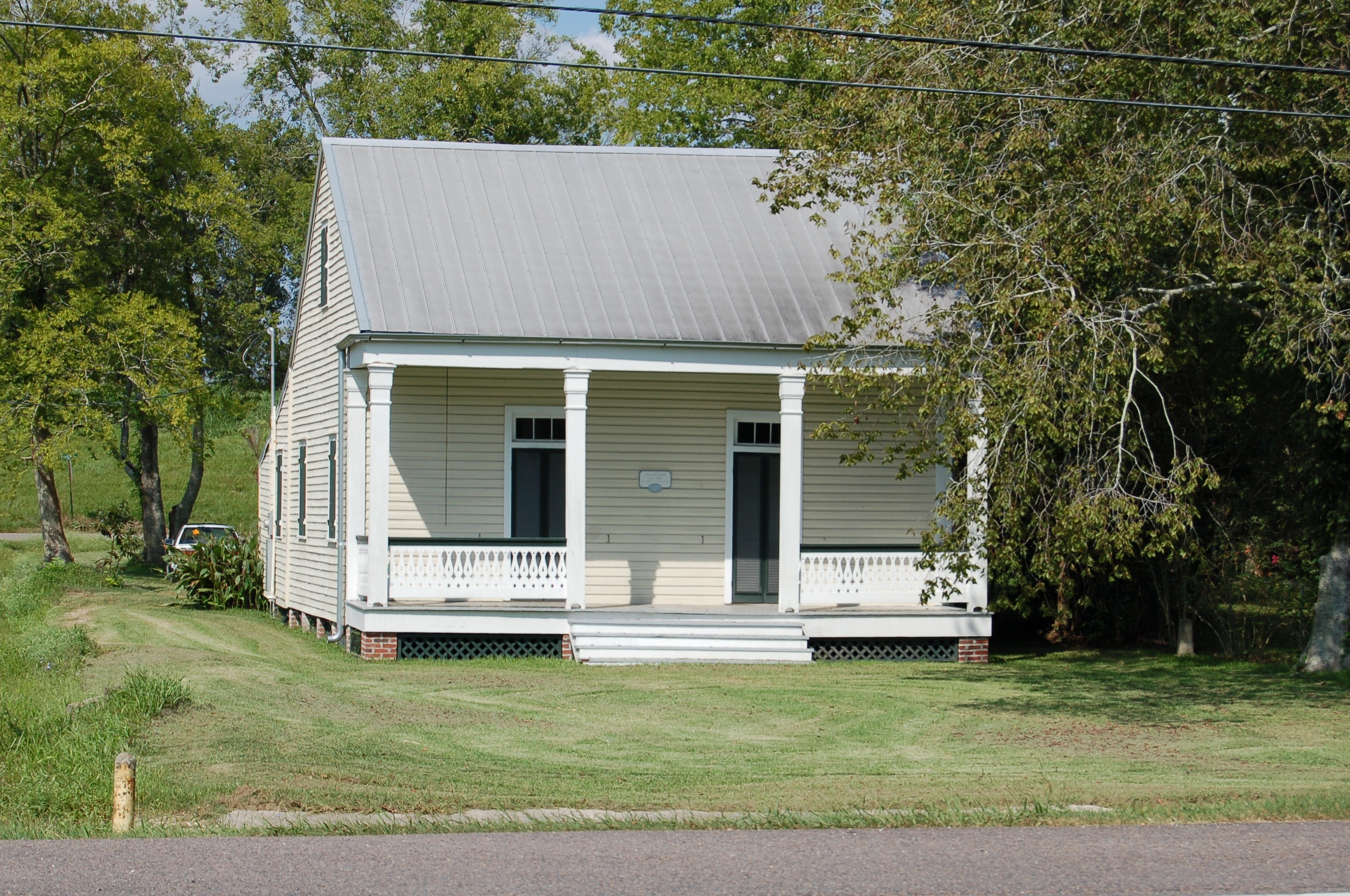
- Rome House, on Louisiana Highway 1, northeast of intersection with Delaney Road

- Location within Louisiana
- Coordinates: 30°6′29.99″N 91°1′13.01″W
- Elevation: 22 ft (6.7 m)

Smoke Bend (French: L'Anse-la-Boucane) is an unincorporated community in Ascension Parish, Louisiana, United States.

A small cottage from the 1870s named Rome House, listed on the National Register of Historic Places, is located here.

== Notable person ==
- Earl Ernest Veron - United States federal judge
