= David C. Joseph =

American judge (born 1977)

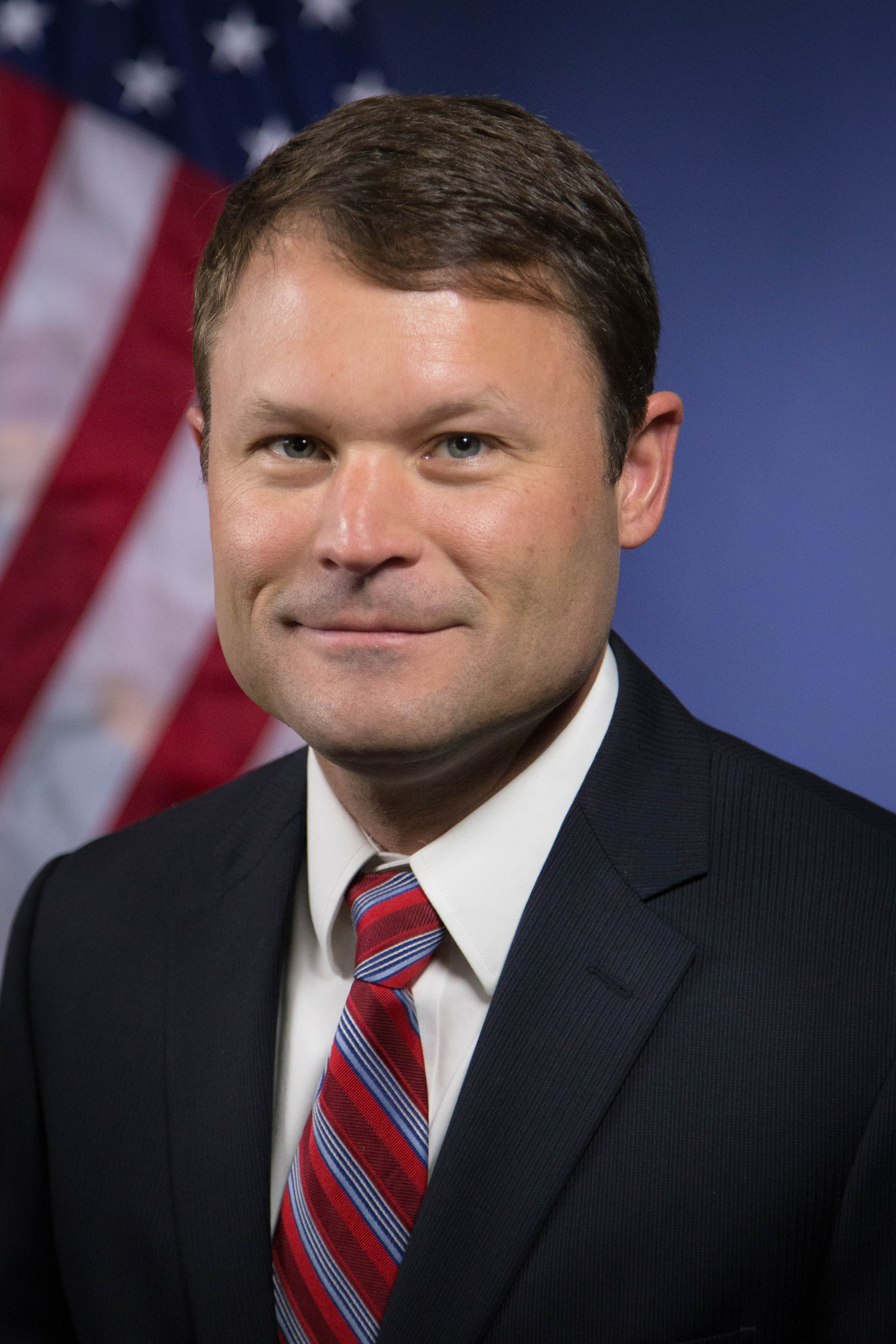

Judge of the United States District Court for the Western District of Louisiana
- Incumbent
- Assumed office July 31, 2020
- Appointed by: Donald Trump
- Preceded by: Dee D. Drell

United States Attorney for the Western District of Louisiana
- In office March 30, 2018 – August 3, 2020
- President: Donald Trump
- Preceded by: Stephanie A. Finley
- Succeeded by: Brandon B. Brown

Personal details
- Born: David Cleveland Joseph; 1977 (age 48–49) Dallas, Texas, U.S.
- Education: University of Oklahoma (BBA); Louisiana State University (JD)
- Civilian awards: EPA Bronze Medal for Commendable Service

Military service
- Allegiance: United States
- Branch/service: Oklahoma Army National Guard (1997–2000); Louisiana Army National Guard (2000–2003); United States Army (2005–2008); United States Army Reserve (2011–2013)
- Rank: Captain
- Unit: 239th Military Police Company, 3rd Cavalry Regiment; United States Army Judge Advocate General's Corps
- Military awards: See list: Army Commendation Medal Army Achievement Medal (with Bronze Oak Leaf Cluster) Global War on Terrorism Service Medal Army Service Ribbon Oklahoma Good Conduct Ribbon (with Two-Knot Good Conduct Loop

David Cleveland Joseph (born 1977) is a United States district judge of the United States District Court for the Western District of Louisiana. He was previously United States Attorney for the same district.

== Education ==
Joseph received his Bachelor of Business Administration from the University of Oklahoma and his Juris Doctor from the Paul M. Hebert Law Center at Louisiana State University, where he was a member of the Louisiana Law Review and was inducted into the Order of the Coif. After graduating, he clerked for Associate Justice Jeffrey P. Victory of the Louisiana Supreme Court and Judge John Victor Parker of the United States District Court for the Middle District of Louisiana.

== Career ==
Prior to joining the Department of Justice, he served as a prosecutor in the U.S. Army Judge Advocate General's Corps, as an attorney in the Professional Liability & Financial Crimes Section of the Federal Deposit Insurance Corporation, and as an associate in the law firms Fulbright & Jaworski and Kane, Russell, Coleman & Logan, PC.

Joseph previously served as an assistant United States attorney for the Western District of Louisiana, where he prosecuted a wide variety of offenses, with a focus on fraud, public corruption, white-collar crime, and crimes committed on the district's military installations.

=== United States attorney ===
On February 16, 2018, President Trump announced Joseph as the nominee to be United States Attorney for the Western District of Louisiana. On March 22, 2018, his nomination was reported out of Senate Judiciary Committee by voice vote. He was confirmed by voice vote later the same day. He was sworn in on March 30, 2018. During his tenure, he created a human trafficking task force. His service as U.S. Attorney ended on August 3, 2020, when he resigned to become a federal judge.

=== Federal judicial service ===
On November 20, 2019, President Donald Trump announced his intent to nominate Joseph to serve as a United States district judge for the United States District Court for the Western District of Louisiana.

On December 2, 2019, his nomination was sent to the United States Senate. President Trump nominated Joseph to the seat vacated by Judge Dee D. Drell, who assumed senior status on November 30, 2017. On January 3, 2020, his nomination was returned to the President under Rule XXXI, Paragraph 6 of the United States Senate.

On January 6, 2020, his renomination was sent to the Senate. A hearing on his nomination before the Senate Judiciary Committee was held on January 8, 2020. On May 14, 2020, his nomination was reported out of committee by a 12–10 vote. On July 28, 2020, the Senate invoked cloture on his nomination by a 55–42 vote. His nomination was confirmed later that day by a 55–42 vote. He received his judicial commission on July 31, 2020.

On January 10, 2024, he upheld the National Firearms Act as applied to silencers by saying that they are "dangerous and unusual weapons" in denying a motion to dismiss.

Legal offices
Preceded by Stephanie A. Finley	United States Attorney for the Western District of Louisiana; 2018–2020	Succeeded by Alexander C. Van Hook; Acting
Preceded by Dee D. Drell	Judge of the United States District Court for the Western District of Louisiana; 2020–present	Incumbent
