= Milton C. Elstner =

American lawyer and judge (1848–1912)

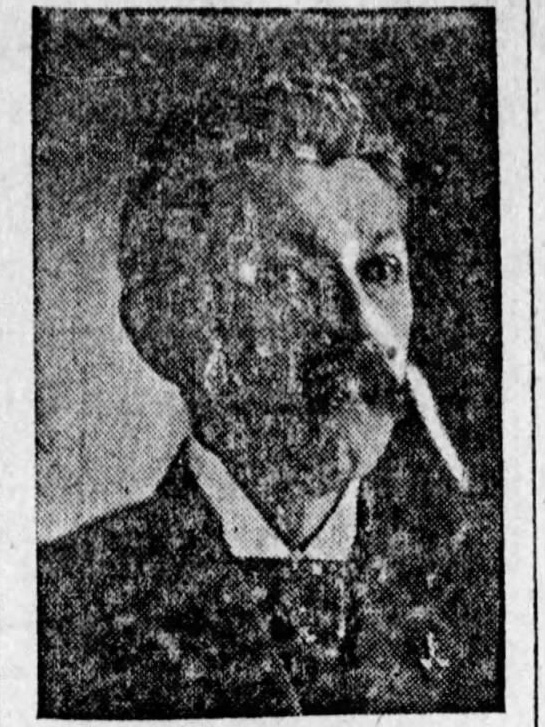

United States Attorney for the Western District of Louisiana
- In office 1881–1885
- President: Chester A. Arthur
- Preceded by: H. B. Talliaferro
- Succeeded by: Montfort S. Jones

United States Attorney for the Western District of Louisiana
- In office 1889–1893
- President: Benjamin Harrison
- Preceded by: Montfort S. Jones
- Succeeded by: Charles W. Seals

United States Attorney for the Western District of Louisiana
- In office 1898–1910
- President: William McKinley
- Preceded by: Charles W. Seals
- Succeeded by: Edward H. Randolph

Personal details
- Born: Milton Casper Elstner; November 14, 1848 Grant County, Kentucky, U.S.
- Died: October 13, 1912 (aged 63) Shreveport, Louisiana
- Spouse: Julia Smoker Elstner (married 1873; died 1936)
- Children: 5
- Parents: William H. Elstner (father); Anna Carter Elstner (mother)
- Education: University of Kentucky (Bachelor)(JD)
- Nickname: Milt

Military service
- Allegiance: Confederate States of America
- Branch/service: Confederate States Army
- Years of service: 1865
- Rank: Quartermaster
- Unit: 3rd Arkansas Infantry Regiment

Milton Casper Elstner (1848–1912) was an American lawyer and former confederate soldier from Grant County, Kentucky. He served as United States Attorney for the Western District of Louisiana three separate times under five presidents.

== Childhood ==
Milton was born to W. H. and Anna S. (Carter) Elstner, who were Kentucky natives. Milton and his parents came to Louisiana in 1859, locating in Caddo Parish. After living there a few years they moved to Arkansas, but in 1863, returned to Louisiana. In 1865 at the end of the American Civil War he joined one of the first Arkansas regiments (the Third), and was with Ben McCullough and McIntosh when they were killed at the battle of Elk Horn, which was a fight between Sigel and Earl Van Dorn. During his service he held the rank of major and quartermaster.

== Law career ==
Milton received his collegiate education at the University of Kentucky in 1872 graduated from the law department of the same institution. He was first admitted to practice before the Supreme Court of Kentucky, and that year was admitted to the same in Shreveport, Louisiana, and in 1874 entered upon his practice. During the administration of President Arthur he filled the position of United States Attorney for the western district of Louisiana and in July, 1889, was re-appointed to the same office, and his duties have been performed in a manner highly flattering to himself ever since. He was an able lawyer, with a convincing and eloquent speech, and the reputation he gained was acquired largely through his own individual efforts and at the expense of diligent study and practical experience. In 1898, he once again was appointed to the position and he held it until 1910.
