= Earl Ernest Veron =

American judge (1922–1990)

Senior Judge of the United States District Court for the Western District of Louisiana
- In office February 13, 1990 – August 28, 1990

Judge of the United States District Court for the Western District of Louisiana
- In office August 5, 1977 – February 13, 1990
- Appointed by: Jimmy Carter
- Preceded by: Edwin F. Hunter
- Succeeded by: James Travis Trimble Jr.

Personal details
- Born: Earl Ernest Veron; January 2, 1922 Smoke Bend, Louisiana, U.S.
- Died: August 28, 1990 (aged 68) New Orleans, Louisiana, U.S.
- Education: McNeese State University (BA); Paul M. Hebert Law Center (JD)

Earl Ernest Veron (January 2, 1922 – August 28, 1990) was a United States district judge of the United States District Court for the Western District of Louisiana.

== Education and career ==
Born in Smoke Bend, Louisiana, Veron received a Bachelor of Arts degree from McNeese State University in 1957 and a Juris Doctor from the Paul M. Hebert Law Center at Louisiana State University in 1959. He was in private practice in Lake Charles, Louisiana from 1959 to 1968. He was a judge of the 14th Judiciary District in Lake Charles from 1967 to 1977.

== Federal judicial service ==
On July 19, 1977, Veron was nominated by President Jimmy Carter to a seat on the United States District Court for the Western District of Louisiana vacated by Judge Edwin F. Hunter. Veron was confirmed by the United States Senate on August 4, 1977, and received his commission the following day. He assumed senior status due to a certified disability on February 13, 1990, serving in that capacity until his death.

== Death ==
Veron died on August 28, 1990, of heart failure at the Tulane Medical Center in New Orleans, after collapsing earlier that day at the Federal Courthouse in New Orleans.

== Sources ==
Legal offices
Preceded by Edwin F. Hunter	Judge of the United States District Court for the Western District of Louisiana; 1977–1990	Succeeded by James Travis Trimble Jr.
