= Rebecca F. Doherty =

American judge (born 1952)

Rebecca Gayle Feeney Doherty

Senior Judge of the United States District Court for the Western District of Louisiana
- In office June 5, 2017 – May 1, 2020

Judge of the United States District Court for the Western District of Louisiana
- In office November 5, 1991 – June 5, 2017
- Appointed by: George H. W. Bush
- Preceded by: Seat established by 104 Stat. 5089
- Succeeded by: Robert R. Summerhays

Personal details
- Born: Rebecca Gayle Feeney; June 3, 1952 (age 74) Fort Worth, Texas
- Education: Northwestern State University (BA, MA); Louisiana State University Law Center (JD)

Rebecca Gayle Feeney Doherty (born June 3, 1952) is a former United States district judge of the United States District Court for the Western District of Louisiana.

== Education and career ==
Born Rebecca Gayle Feeney in Fort Worth, Texas, Doherty in 1973 received a Bachelor of Arts degree from Northwestern State University in Natchitoches, Louisiana. Two years later, she procured a Master of Arts from the same institution. In 1981, she obtained a Juris Doctor from the Louisiana State University Law Center in Baton Rouge. From 1981 to 1991, she was in private practice in Lafayette, Louisiana.

== Federal judicial service ==
On June 27, 1991, Doherty was nominated by President George H. W. Bush to a new seat on the United States District Court for the Western District of Louisiana created by 104 Stat. 5089. She was confirmed by the United States Senate on October 31, 1991, and received her commission on November 5, 1991. She assumed senior status on June 5, 2017, and retired on May 1, 2020.

== Sources ==
Legal offices
Preceded by Seat established by 104 Stat. 5089	Judge of the United States District Court for the Western District of Louisiana; 1991–2017	Succeeded by Robert R. Summerhays
