= S. Maurice Hicks Jr. =

American judge (born 1952)

Samuel Maurice Hicks Jr.
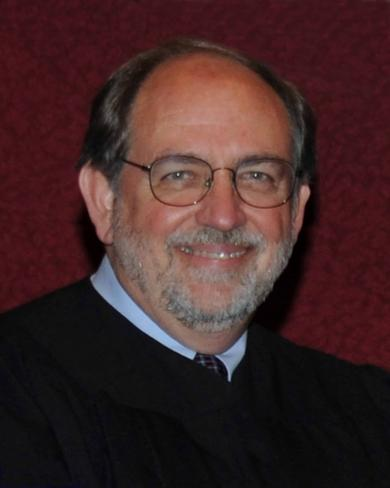

Chief Judge of the United States District Court for the Western District of Louisiana
- In office November 3, 2017 – December 5, 2022
- Preceded by: Dee D. Drell
- Succeeded by: Terry A. Doughty

Judge of the United States District Court for the Western District of Louisiana
- Incumbent
- Assumed office May 21, 2003
- Appointed by: George W. Bush
- Preceded by: Donald Ellsworth Walter

Personal details
- Born: Samuel Maurice Hicks Jr. December 5, 1952 (age 73) New Orleans, Louisiana, U.S.
- Education: Texas Christian University (BA); Paul M. Hebert Law Center (JD)

Samuel Maurice Hicks Jr., known professionally as S. Maurice Hicks Jr., (born December 5, 1952) is a United States district judge of the United States District Court for the Western District of Louisiana.

== Education and career ==
Born in New Orleans, Hicks received a Bachelor of Arts degree from Texas Christian University in 1974 and a Juris Doctor from the Paul M. Hebert Law Center at Louisiana State University in 1977. He was a law clerk and staff attorney of the Louisiana Legislative Council from 1975 to 1977. He was in private practice in Shreveport, Louisiana, from 1977 to 2003.

== District court service ==
On September 12, 2002, Hicks was nominated by President George W. Bush to a seat on the United States District Court for the Western District of Louisiana vacated by Donald Ellsworth Walter. Hicks was confirmed by the United States Senate on May 19, 2003 by a 86–0 vote. He received his commission on May 21, 2003. He served as chief judge from November 3, 2017 to December 5, 2022, being mandated to step down on his 70th birthday.

Legal offices
Preceded by Donald Ellsworth Walter	Judge of the United States District Court for the Western District of Louisiana; 2003–present	Incumbent
Preceded by Dee D. Drell	Chief Judge of the United States District Court for the Western District of Louisiana; 2017–2022	Succeeded by Terry A. Doughty
