= Tucker L. Melancon =

American judge (born 1946)

Tucker Lee Melançon

Senior Judge of the United States District Court for the Western District of Louisiana
- Incumbent
- Assumed office February 14, 2009

Judge of the United States District Court for the Western District of Louisiana
- In office February 11, 1994 – February 14, 2009
- Appointed by: Bill Clinton
- Preceded by: Tom Stagg
- Succeeded by: Elizabeth Erny Foote

Personal details
- Born: Tucker Lee Melançon; February 3, 1946 (age 80) Bryan, Texas, U.S.
- Education: Louisiana State University (BS); Tulane University Law School (JD)

Tucker Lee Melançon (born February 3, 1946) is a senior United States district judge of the United States District Court for the Western District of Louisiana.

== Education and legal career ==
Melancon graduated from Louisiana State University with a Bachelor of Science degree in 1968. He finished studies at Tulane Law School with a Juris Doctor in 1973. He was a managing partner at Melancon & Rabalais, private practice with his colleague, Rodney M. Rabalais, in Marksville, Louisiana, from 1973 to 1993.

=== Federal judicial service ===
On the unanimous recommendation of Louisiana U.S. Senators John Breaux and Bennett Johnston, Melancon was nominated by President Clinton on November 18, 1993, to a seat vacated by Tom Stagg as Stagg assumed senior status. Melancon was confirmed by the United States Senate on February 10, 1994, and received his commission the following day. He assumed senior status on February 14, 2009, due to a certified disability.

=== Notable cases ===
Melancon has presided over a number of cases in his judicial tenure of fifteen years. He has heard a variety of trials, including class action, tax evasion, drug trafficking, cross burning, as well as issues where the First Amendment and Clean Water Act standards were at stake or being violated. However, his legacy might be his devotion to desegregation in public schools in the parishes which fall under his jurisdiction; St. Landry, Evangeline, and Franklin, among others.

He sentenced one Evangeline Parish board member to ten days of incarceration with three days suspension, as well as high fines for criminal contempt (or contempt of court) a charge to which the board member had pleaded guilty for attempting to manipulate a court-ordered employment process. One fine, US $3,000, was, according to Melancon, retribution for what he said was the board member's violation of the court's desegregation order. Melancon was cited in one Fifth Circuit decision as having been "heavy-handed" and tending towards "over management" in his dealings with the parish school boards on the desegregation issues.

In November 2009, Melancon was a visiting judge presiding over cases relating to the Staten Island ferry disaster in New York City.

== Cancer ==
Melancon was diagnosed with stage-three breast cancer in 2003. After undergoing a mastectomy, radiation therapy, and chemotherapy, the cancer went into remission but resurfaced three years later. His wife, Diana Moore, helped him carve out a raw foods diet they learned from the Hippocrates Health Institute in Palm Beach, Florida.

== Quotes ==
- "Nothing is more sacred than the First Amendment... You don't change the standard just because it involves minors." He said these words in August 2000 during the Skate Zone trial in Iberia Parish.

== Other roles ==
Pink ribbon

- Board Member, National Coalition for Cancer Survivorship
- President, Avoyelles Parish Bar Association (1977–1978)
- House of Delegates, Louisiana State Bar Association (1973–1975 and 1990–1994)
- Bar Association for the First and Fifth Federal Circuits
- Federal Bar Association (New Orleans chapter)
- Louisiana Bar Foundation
- American Judicature Society
- Member, American Inns of Court:
  - Judge Fred Fudickar Chapter
  - Cross-Roads American Inn of Court of Alexandria-Pineville Chapter
  - John M. Dube Chapter
- Louisiana Workers' Compensation Advisory Board (1990–1991)
- Committee to Study Backlog in the Courts of Appeal, First and Third Circuits, by appointment of the Louisiana Supreme Court, 1991
- American Trial Lawyers' Association
- President Advisory Board, Louisiana Trial Lawyers' Association

Legal offices
Preceded by Tom Stagg	Judge of the United States District Court for the Western District of Louisiana; 1994–2009	Succeeded by Elizabeth Erny Foote
