= John Malach Shaw =

American judge (1931–1999)

Senior Judge of the United States District Court for the Western District of Louisiana
- In office November 15, 1996 – December 24, 1999

Chief Judge of the United States District Court for the Western District of Louisiana
- In office 1991–1996
- Preceded by: Tom Stagg
- Succeeded by: F. A. Little Jr.

Judge of the United States District Court for the Western District of Louisiana
- In office September 26, 1979 – November 15, 1996
- Appointed by: Jimmy Carter
- Preceded by: Seat established by 92 Stat. 1629
- Succeeded by: Robert G. James

Personal details
- Born: John Malach Shaw; November 14, 1931 Beaumont, Texas, U.S.
- Died: December 24, 1999 (aged 68) Lafayette, Louisiana, U.S.
- Education: Washington and Lee University (BS); Paul M. Hebert Law Center (JD)

John Malach Shaw (November 14, 1931 – December 24, 1999) was a United States district judge of the United States District Court for the Western District of Louisiana.

== Education and career ==
Born in Beaumont, Texas, Shaw received a Bachelor of Science degree from Washington and Lee University in 1953 and a Juris Doctor from the Paul M. Hebert Law Center at Louisiana State University in 1956. He was in the United States Army from 1956 to 1958, and then in the United States Army Reserve until 1964, achieving the rank of captain. He was in private practice in Opelousas, Louisiana from 1958 to 1979.

== Federal judicial service ==
On June 5, 1979, Shaw was nominated by President Jimmy Carter to a new seat on the United States District Court for the Western District of Louisiana created by 92 Stat. 1629. He was confirmed by the United States Senate on September 25, 1979, and received his commission on September 26, 1979. He served as Chief Judge from 1991 to 1996, assuming senior status on November 15, 1996. He served in that capacity until his death on December 24, 1999, in Lafayette, Louisiana.

== Sources ==
Legal offices
Preceded by Seat established by 92 Stat. 1629	Judge of the United States District Court for the Western District of Louisiana; 1979–1996	Succeeded by Robert G. James
Preceded by Tom Stagg	Chief Judge of the United States District Court for the Western District of Louisiana; 1991–1996	Succeeded by F. A. Little Jr.
