= Israel B. Curtis =

American politician (1932–2012)

Member of the Louisiana House of Representatives
- In office 1992–2008
- Preceded by: Charles Herring
- Succeeded by: Herbert B. Dixon

Personal details
- Born: Israel Benjamin Curtis; September 11, 1932 Louisiana, U.S.
- Died: February 16, 2012 (aged 79) Alexandria, Louisiana, U.S.
- Party: Democratic
- Spouse: Barbara Curtis
- Children: 3
- Education: Grambling State University; Northwestern State University; Texas Christian University; Texas Southern University; Michigan State University

Israel Benjamin Curtis (September 11, 1932 – February 16, 2012) was an American politician. A member of the Democratic Party, he served in the Louisiana House of Representatives from 1992 to 2008.

== Life and career ==
Curtis was born in Louisiana, the son of Israel Sr. and Maria Curtis. He attended and graduated from Peabody Magnet High School. After graduating, he served in the United States Army during the Korean War, which after his discharge, he attended Grambling State University, earning his BS degree. He also attended Northwestern State University, earning his master's degree. After earning his degrees, he completed graduate studies at Texas Christian University, Texas Southern University and Michigan State University, which after completing his graduate studies, he worked as a teacher, and was a personal bodyguard for Martin Luther King Jr., a civil rights activist.

Curtis served in the Louisiana House of Representatives from 1992 to 2008.

== Death ==
Curtis died on February 16, 2012, in Alexandria, Louisiana at the age of 79. He was buried at Alexandria Memorial Gardens.
