= Philip Kissick Lawrence =

American judge

Judge of the United States District Court for the Eastern District of Louisiana Judge of the United States District Court for the Western District of Louisiana
- In office September 12, 1837 – March 19, 1841
- Appointed by: Martin Van Buren
- Preceded by: Samuel Hadden Harper
- Succeeded by: Theodore Howard McCaleb

Personal details
- Born: Philip Kissick Lawrence c. 1793 New York, New York
- Died: May 19, 1841 (aged 47–48) New Orleans, Louisiana
- Education: Columbia University; Litchfield Law School (LL.B.)

Philip Kissick Lawrence (c. 1793 – May 19, 1841) was a United States district judge of the United States District Court for the Eastern District of Louisiana and the United States District Court for the Western District of Louisiana.

== Education and career ==
Born c. 1793 in New York City, to Gilbert Lawrence and Margaret Kissick Lawrence, Lawrence graduated from Columbia University in 1812, received a Bachelor of Laws from Litchfield Law School in 1814, and received a master's degree from Columbia University in 1818. He was admitted to the New York bar in 1818. He moved to Louisiana and continued private practice in New Orleans, Louisiana until 1837. He was a member of the Louisiana House of Representatives. He was editor of the New Orleans Morning Post from 1835 to 1836. He was the United States Attorney for the Districts of Louisiana until 1837. He was a member of the Whig Party.

== Federal judicial service ==
Lawrence was nominated by President Martin Van Buren on September 6, 1837, to a joint seat on the United States District Court for the Eastern District of Louisiana and the United States District Court for the Western District of Louisiana vacated by Judge Samuel Hadden Harper. He was confirmed by the United States Senate on September 12, 1837, and received his commission the same day. His service terminated on March 19, 1841, due to his death in New Orleans.

=== Controversy and attempted impeachment ===
Lawrence is most notably mentioned in the available historical materials for a controversy involving the court's clerk. In 1834, his predecessor had appointed Duncan N. Hennen Clerk of Court, and Hennen, who by all accounts had performed satisfactorily, held the post upon Lawrence's appointment. On May 18, 1838, however, Lawrence wrote Hennen a letter firing him: "In taking this step," Lawrence wrote, "I desire to be understood as neither prompted by any unfriendly disposition towards you personally, nor wishing to cast the slightest shade of censure on your official conduct. On the contrary, ... a sense of justice to you demands that I should do what lies in my power to repel any unfavourable inference that might be drawn from your dismissal ... In appointing [John] Winthrop to succeed you, I have been purely actuated by a sense of duty and feelings of kindness towards one whom I have long known, and between whom and myself the closest friendship has always subsisted." Hennen sought reinstatement to his position by filing a petition for a writ of mandamus in the Supreme Court of the United States, but the Court refused to issue the writ, finding that the power both to appoint and to remove the Clerk of Court, even without cause, at that time was entirely within the judge's discretion, and that there was no constitutional or other legal obstacle to Lawrence's actions.

Hennen then petitioned the United States House of Representatives, requesting an investigation of Lawrence. A special committee of the House recommended on February 11, 1839, that Lawrence be impeached for his actions concerning the Clerk of Court. However, no action was taken by the full House.

== Sources ==
- Philip Kissick Lawrence at United States District Court for the Eastern District of Louisiana

Legal offices
Preceded by Samuel Hadden Harper	Judge of the United States District Court for the Eastern District of Louisiana; Judge of the United States District Court for the Western District of Louisiana; 1837–1841	Succeeded by Theodore Howard McCaleb
