= Nauman Scott =

American judge

Nauman Steele Scott II

Senior Judge of the United States District Court for the Western District of Louisiana
- In office December 4, 1984 – September 19, 2001

Chief Judge of the United States District Court for the Western District of Louisiana
- In office 1976–1984
- Preceded by: Edwin F. Hunter
- Succeeded by: Tom Stagg

Judge of the United States District Court for the Western District of Louisiana
- In office October 15, 1970 – December 4, 1984
- Appointed by: Richard Nixon
- Preceded by: Seat established by 84 Stat. 294
- Succeeded by: F. A. Little Jr.

Personal details
- Born: Nauman Steele Scott II; June 15, 1916 New Roads, Louisiana, U.S.
- Died: September 19, 2001 (aged 85) Alexandria, Louisiana, U.S.
- Children: Jock Scott
- Relatives: Albin Provosty (grandfather); Olivier O. Provosty (great-uncle)
- Education: Amherst College (B.A.); Tulane University Law School (LL.B.)

Nauman Steele Scott (June 15, 1916 – September 19, 2001) was a United States district judge of the United States District Court for the Western District of Louisiana.

== Education and career ==
Born in New Roads, Louisiana, Scott received a Bachelor of Arts degree from Amherst College in 1938. He received a Bachelor of Laws from Tulane University Law School in 1941. He was in private practice of law in Alexandria, Louisiana from 1941 to 1942. He was a United States Army Air Corps First Lieutenant from 1942 to 1946. He was in private practice of law in Alexandria from 1946 to 1970.

== Federal judicial service ==
Scott was nominated by President Richard Nixon on September 14, 1970, to the United States District Court for the Western District of Louisiana, to a new seat created by 84 Stat. 294. He was confirmed by the United States Senate on October 13, 1970, and received his commission on October 15, 1970. He served as chief judge from 1976 to 1984. He assumed senior status on December 4, 1984. His service was terminated on September 19, 2001, due to his death in Alexandria.

== Sources ==
- FJC Bio

Legal offices
Preceded by Seat established by 84 Stat. 294	Judge of the United States District Court for the Western District of Louisiana; 1970–1984	Succeeded by F. A. Little Jr.
Preceded by Edwin F. Hunter	Chief Judge of the United States District Court for the Western District of Louisiana; 1976–1984	Succeeded by Tom Stagg
