= Tom Stagg (judge) =

American lawyer

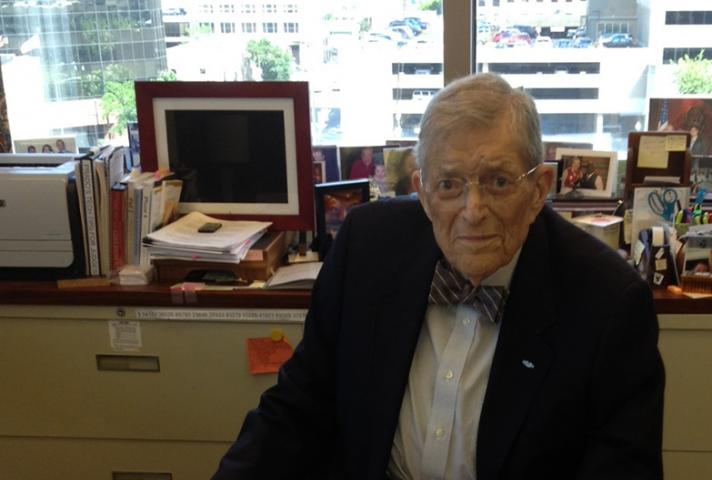

Senior Judge of the United States District Court for the Western District of Louisiana
- In office February 29, 1992 – June 23, 2015

Chief Judge of the United States District Court for the Western District of Louisiana
- In office 1984–1991
- Preceded by: Nauman Scott
- Succeeded by: John Malach Shaw

Judge of the United States District Court for the Western District of Louisiana
- In office March 8, 1974 – February 29, 1992
- Appointed by: Richard Nixon
- Preceded by: Benjamin C. Dawkins Jr.
- Succeeded by: Tucker L. Melancon

Personal details
- Born: Thomas E. Stagg Jr. January 19, 1923 Shreveport, Louisiana, U.S.
- Died: June 23, 2015 (aged 92) Shreveport, Louisiana, U.S.
- Education: Louisiana State University (B.A.); Paul M. Hebert Law Center (LL.B.)

Thomas E. Stagg Jr. (January 19, 1923 – June 23, 2015) was a United States district judge of the United States District Court for the Western District of Louisiana.

== Education and career ==
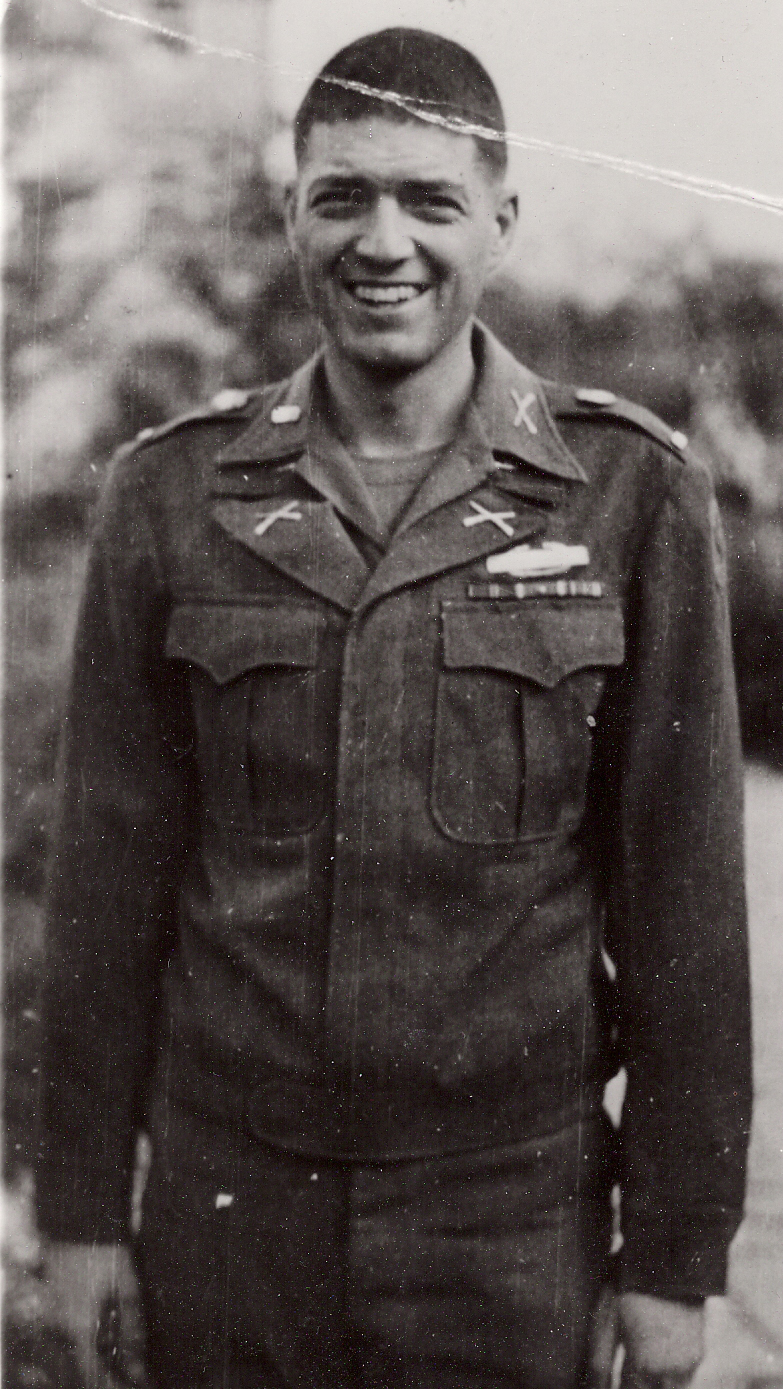
Stagg during his military service

Born on January 19, 1923, in Shreveport, Louisiana, Stagg received a Bachelor of Arts degree in 1943 from Louisiana State University and a Bachelor of Laws in 1949 from the Paul M. Hebert Law Center at Louisiana State University. He was a United States Army infantry Captain from 1943 to 1946. He entered private practice in Shreveport from 1949 to 1974. He was Vice-President of King Hardware Company in Louisiana from 1955 to 1974. He was President of the Abe Meyer Corporation in Shreveport from 1960 to 1974. He was managing partner of the Pierremont Mall Shopping Center from 1963 to 1974. He was President of Stagg Investments, Inc. from 1964 to 1974. He was managing partner of the Camellia Trading Company starting in 1974.

== Federal judicial service ==
Stagg was nominated by President Richard Nixon on February 18, 1974, to a seat on the United States District Court for the Western District of Louisiana vacated by Judge Benjamin C. Dawkins Jr. He was confirmed by the United States Senate on March 7, 1974, and received his commission on March 8, 1974. He served as Chief Judge from 1984 to 1991. He assumed senior status on February 29, 1992. His service terminated on June 23, 2015, due to his death in Shreveport.

== See also ==
- List of United States federal judges by longevity of service

Party political offices
Vacant Title last held by Nealon Stracener	Republican nominee for Attorney General of Louisiana; 1972	Vacant Title next held by Ben Bagert
Legal offices
Preceded by Benjamin C. Dawkins Jr.	Judge of the United States District Court for the Western District of Louisiana; 1974–1992	Succeeded by Tucker L. Melancon
Preceded by Nauman Scott	Chief Judge of the United States District Court for the Western District of Louisiana; 1984–1991	Succeeded by John Malach Shaw
