= James Travis Trimble Jr. =

American judge (born 1932)

Senior Judge of the United States District Court for the Western District of Louisiana
- Incumbent
- Assumed office September 13, 2002

Judge of the United States District Court for the Western District of Louisiana
- In office September 16, 1991 – September 13, 2002
- Appointed by: George H. W. Bush
- Preceded by: Earl Ernest Veron
- Succeeded by: Patricia Head Minaldi

Magistrate Judge of the United States District Court for the Western District of Louisiana
- In office 1986–1991

Personal details
- Born: September 13, 1932 (age 93) Bunkie, Louisiana, U.S.
- Education: Louisiana State University (BA, LLB)

James Travis Trimble Jr. (born September 13, 1932) is a senior United States district judge of the United States District Court for the Western District of Louisiana.

== Education and career ==
Born in Bunkie, Louisiana, Trimble received a Bachelor of Arts from Louisiana State University in 1955 and a Bachelor of Laws from Louisiana State University Law School in 1956. He was a United States Air Force JAG Corps officer from 1956 to 1959. He was in private practice in Alexandria, Louisiana from 1959 to 1986, and served as a United States magistrate judge for the United States District Court for the Western District of Louisiana from 1986 to 1991.

=== Federal judicial service ===
Trimble was nominated by President George H. W. Bush on June 27, 1991, to a seat on the United States District Court for the Western District of Louisiana vacated by Judge Earl Ernest Veron. He was confirmed by the United States Senate on September 12, 1991, and received his commission on September 16, 1991. He assumed senior status on September 13, 2002.

== Sources ==
Legal offices
Preceded by Earl Ernest Veron	Judge of the United States District Court for the Western District of Louisiana; 1991–2002	Succeeded by Patricia Head Minaldi
