= Donald Ellsworth Walter =

American judge (born 1936)

Senior Judge of the United States District Court for the Western District of Louisiana
- Incumbent
- Assumed office November 30, 2001

Judge of the United States District Court for the Western District of Louisiana
- In office July 11, 1985 – November 30, 2001
- Appointed by: Ronald Reagan
- Preceded by: Seat established by 98 Stat. 333
- Succeeded by: S. Maurice Hicks Jr.

United States Attorney for the Western District of Louisiana
- In office 1969–1977

Personal details
- Born: March 15, 1936 (age 90) Jennings, Louisiana, U.S.
- Party: Republican
- Education: Louisiana State University (BA, JD)

Donald Ellsworth Walter (born March 15, 1936) is a senior United States district judge of the United States District Court for the Western District of Louisiana, based in Shreveport.

== Education and career ==
He was born in Jennings in Jefferson Davis Parish in southwestern Louisiana. He was an enlisted soldier in the United States Army from 1957 to 1958 and was stationed at Fort Bliss. He received a Bachelor of Arts degree from Louisiana State University in 1961 and a Juris Doctor from Paul M. Hebert Law Center at Louisiana State University in 1964. He was in private practice in Lake Charles, Louisiana, from 1964 to 1969 and was the United States Attorney for the Western District of Louisiana from 1969 to 1977.

=== Federal judicial service ===
On May 15, 1985, Walter was nominated by President Ronald Reagan to a new seat on the United States District Court for the Western District of Louisiana created by 98 Stat. 333. He was confirmed by the United States Senate on July 10, 1985, receiving his commission the following day. Walter assumed senior status on November 30, 2001.

== Sources ==
Legal offices
Preceded by Seat established by 98 Stat. 333	Judge of the United States District Court for the Western District of Louisiana; 1985–2001	Succeeded by S. Maurice Hicks Jr.
