= Benjamin C. Dawkins Sr. =

American judge

Benjamin Cornwell Dawkins Sr.

Senior Judge of the United States District Court for the Western District of Louisiana
- In office May 17, 1953 – August 22, 1966

Chief Judge of the United States District Court for the Western District of Louisiana
- In office 1948–1953
- Preceded by: Office established
- Succeeded by: Benjamin C. Dawkins Jr.

Judge of the United States District Court for the Western District of Louisiana
- In office May 5, 1924 – May 17, 1953
- Appointed by: Calvin Coolidge
- Preceded by: George W. Jack
- Succeeded by: Benjamin C. Dawkins Jr.

Personal details
- Born: Benjamin Cornwell Dawkins; July 19, 1881 Ouachita City, Louisiana
- Died: August 22, 1966 (aged 85)
- Education: Tulane University Law School (LL.B.)

Benjamin Cornwell Dawkins Sr. (July 19, 1881 – August 22, 1966) was a United States district judge of the United States District Court for the Western District of Louisiana.

== Education and career ==
Born in Ouachita City, an unincorporated community in Union Parish, Louisiana, Dawkins received a Bachelor of Laws from Tulane University Law School in 1906 and entered private practice in Monroe, Louisiana until 1912. From 1912 to 1918, he was a Judge of the Louisiana District Court. In 1918, he became an associate justice of the Supreme Court of Louisiana, a position that he held until 1924.

== Federal judicial service ==
Dawkins was nominated by President Calvin Coolidge on April 25, 1924, to a seat on the United States District Court for the Western District of Louisiana vacated by Judge George W. Jack. He was confirmed by the United States Senate on May 5, 1924, and received his commission the same day. He served as Chief Judge from 1948 to 1953. He assumed senior status on May 17, 1953, and was succeeded by his son, Judge Benjamin C. Dawkins Jr. His service terminated on August 22, 1966, due to his death.

== Sources ==
Legal offices
Preceded by George W. Jack	Judge of the United States District Court for the Western District of Louisiana; 1924–1953	Succeeded by Benjamin C. Dawkins Jr.
Preceded by Office established	Chief Judge of the United States District Court for the Western District of Louisiana; 1948–1953	Succeeded by Benjamin C. Dawkins Jr.
