= Benjamin C. Dawkins Jr. =

American judge (1911–1984)

Senior Judge of the United States District Court for the Western District of Louisiana
- In office August 6, 1973 – August 31, 1984

Chief Judge of the United States District Court for the Western District of Louisiana
- In office 1953–1973
- Preceded by: Benjamin C. Dawkins Sr.
- Succeeded by: Edwin F. Hunter

Judge of the United States District Court for the Western District of Louisiana
- In office August 3, 1953 – August 6, 1973
- Appointed by: Dwight D. Eisenhower
- Preceded by: Benjamin C. Dawkins Sr.
- Succeeded by: Tom Stagg

Personal details
- Born: Benjamin Cornwell Dawkins Jr. August 6, 1911 Monroe, Louisiana, U.S.
- Died: August 31, 1984 (aged 73) Shreveport, Louisiana, U.S.
- Education: Tulane University (B.A.); Paul M. Hebert Law Center (LL.B.)

Benjamin Cornwell Dawkins Jr. (August 6, 1911 – August 31, 1984) was a United States district judge of the United States District Court for the Western District of Louisiana.

== Education and career ==
Born in Monroe, Louisiana, Dawkins received a Bachelor of Arts degree from Tulane University in 1932 and a Bachelor of Laws from the Paul M. Hebert Law Center at Louisiana State University in 1934. In 1933, he served as a law clerk of the United States District Court for the Western District of Louisiana. From 1934 to 1935, he was in private practice in Monroe. From 1935 to 1953, he practiced in Shreveport, Louisiana. He was a lieutenant commander in the United States Naval Reserve from 1942 to 1945.

== Federal judicial service ==
On July 21, 1953, Dawkins was nominated by President Dwight D. Eisenhower to a seat on the United States District Court for the Western District of Louisiana vacated by his father, Benjamin C. Dawkins Sr. The younger Dawkins was confirmed by the United States Senate on July 31, 1953, and received his commission four days later. He served as chief judge from 1953 to 1973. Dawkins assumed senior status due to a certified disability on August 6, 1973, at which time his successor, Tom Stagg was appointed by President Richard Nixon. Dawkins continued to serve in senior status until his death eleven years later on August 31, 1984, in Shreveport.

== Interviews and transcripts ==
Recorded interviews (audiotape and written transcripts) of Judge Ben C. Dawkins Jr. are located in the Louisiana State University, Shreveport library archives. They are divided in two variously dated sections: March 1978 and June 1979.

== Sources ==
Legal offices
Preceded by Benjamin C. Dawkins Sr.	Judge of the United States District Court for the Western District of Louisiana; 1953–1973	Succeeded by Tom Stagg
Preceded by Benjamin C. Dawkins Sr.	Chief Judge of the United States District Court for the Western District of Louisiana; 1953–1973	Succeeded by Edwin F. Hunter
