= Provost (name) =

Provost is a surname of French origin, deriving from a civil or military official responsible for maintaining order (prévôt). It moved to England with its conquering by William of Normandy in 1066.

Notable people with the surname include:

- Alain Provost, French landscape architect
- Andrew J. Provost (1834–1925), American lawyer and politician from New York
- Claude Provost (1933–1984), Canadian ice hockey player
- David Provost (fl. 1700), Mayor of New York City (1699–1700)
- Denise Provost (born 1951), American politician from Maine
- Emily Mower Provost, American computer scientist
- Étienne Provost (1785–1850), French Canadian fur trader active in the American Southwest
- Felicia Provost, American model
- Foster Provost, American computer scientist and professor
- François Provost (1638–1702), French soldier
- George Provost (before 1943–2002), Canadian businessman and politician in Winnipeg
- Glen Provost (born 1949), American Roman Catholic Bishop
- Guy Provost (1925–2004), French Canadian actor
- Jan Provost or Jan Provoost, (c.1462–1529), Flemish painter
- Jon Provost (born 1950), American actor and author
- Lyn Provost, New Zealand public servant
- Mariève Provost (born 1985), Canadian ice hockey player
- Martin Provost, French film director, writer and actor
- Peggy Provost (born 1977), French footballer
- Ruth Provost (born 1949) American politician from Boston
- Stéphane Provost (1967–2005), French Canadian ice hockey official
- Ted Provost (born 1948), American football player
- William Provost or Guilliame Provoost, (fl.1556–1607), Protestant in Antwerp

== See also ==
- Provost (disambiguation) - the page includes interlanguage links to disambiguation pages which contain surname lists among other items
- Prevost (disambiguation)
- Prouvost
- Provoost
- Provoste
- Provosty
