= Provost =

Provost may refer to:

== Officials ==
=== Ecclesiastic ===
- Provost (religion), a high-ranking church official
- Prince-provost, a high-ranking church official

=== Government ===
- Provost (civil), an officer of local government, including the equivalent of a mayor in Scotland
- Lord provost, the equivalent of a lord mayor in Scotland

=== Military ===
- Provost (military police), military police responsible for policing within the armed forces
- Provost marshal, an officer in charge of military police
- Provost Marshal General, commander of the military police in the United States
- Provost sergeant, a sergeant in charge of regimental police in Commonwealth armies

=== Other fields ===
- Provost (education), a senior academic administrator within certain higher education institutions
- Provost (martial arts), a ranking that was second only to master in Renaissance England

== Aircraft ==
- BAC Jet Provost, a British training aircraft
- Percival Provost, British training aircraft

== Geography ==
- Municipal District of Provost No. 52, a municipal district in Alberta, Canada
- Provost, Alberta, a town in Alberta, Canada
  - Provost Airport
- Provost, Virginia, a village in Powhatan County, Virginia, United States
- Provost Avenue, Bronx, NY, the origin of New York State Route 22
- Stour Provost, a village in Dorset, England

== Other uses ==
- Provost (name), a surname
- Arthur Provost Three-Decker, a historic building in Massachusetts, United States
- Provost Academy South Carolina, a virtual public charter school in South Carolina, United States

== Fictional characters ==
- The Provost, a character from the Robert Langdon novel Inferno by Dan Brown

== See also ==
- Provo (disambiguation)
- Prévôt, the French term
