= Prevost =

Prevost, Prévost or Prévôt may refer to:

- Prevost (surname), a French surname

== Places ==
- Prévost (electoral district), Quebec, Canada
- Prévost, Quebec, a community in the Laurentians region of Quebec, Canada
  - Prévost station
- Prevost, a community on Stuart Island, San Juan County, Washington, USA

== Ships ==
- HMCS Prevost, a Canadian naval reserve unit in London, Ontario
- HMS Prevost, a 12-gun schooner that the Royal Navy purchased in 1803 and that the French privateer Austerlitz captured in 1807
- HMS Sir George Prevost, a British naval warship
- USS Lady Prevost (1812), a United States warship

== Other uses ==
- Prevost (bus manufacturer), a Canadian bus manufacturer, division of Volvo Buses
- Prévost reaction, a chemical reaction
- Prevost's ground sparrow, a sparrow
- Prevost's squirrel, a rodent

== See also ==
- Provost (disambiguation)
