= Provosty =

Provosty is a surname derived from the surname Provost. People with the surname include:

- Albin Provosty (1865–1932), Louisiana attorney
- Nathlie Provosty (born 1981), American visual artist
- Olivier O. Provosty (1852–1924), Chief Justice of the Louisiana Supreme Court

== See also ==
- Provost (name)
- Provoost
- Yasna Provoste (born 1969), Chilean teacher and Christian Democrat politician
