= Mendel Catholic High School =

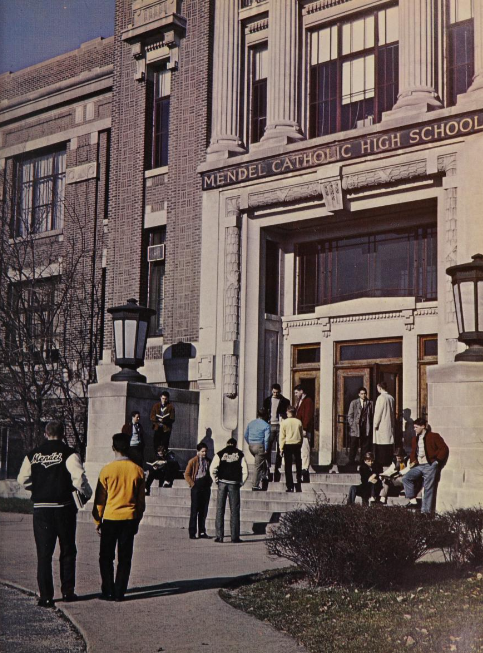
- The front entrance of Mendel in 1962

Location
- 250 E. 111th Street; Chicago, Illinois 60628; United States; 41.6940°N 87.6159°W

Information
- Other names: Gregory Mendel Catholic High School; Mendel Catholic College Preparatory High School
- Religious affiliation: Order of Saint Augustine
- Established: 1951
- Status: Closed
- Closed: 1988
- Grades: 9–12
- Gender: Boys
- Campus size: 40 acre
- Nickname: Monarchs
- Communities served: Roseland, Chicago
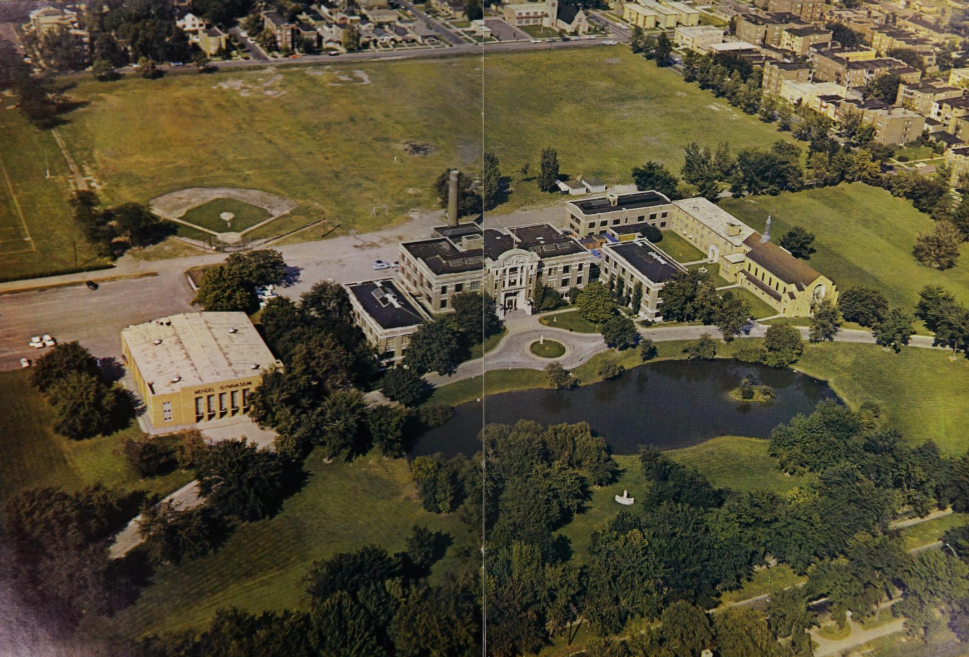
- An overhead view in 1962

Mendel Catholic High School was a Catholic, college-preparatory high school for boys in the Roseland neighborhood of Chicago, Illinois, United States. Named for the Augustinian scientist Gregor Mendel, it operated from 1951 to 1988.

Its campus has served four schools since 1905. It was initially the private Pullman Manual Training School, for children of the workers at the nearby Pullman works. It was acquired by the Order of Saint Augustine in 1950 and operated as Mendel Catholic through 1988, when the Archdiocese of Chicago merged Unity Catholic High School and Willibrord Catholic High School into Mendel. The merged school was named St. Martin de Porres High School, which operated until 1997. Since 1998, the buildings have been the home of the Chicago Public Schools' Gwendolyn Brooks College Preparatory Academy.

== History ==
The Order of Saint Augustine purchased the buildings of the former Pullman Free School of Manual Training in the fall of 1950. Gregory Mendel Catholic High School was established in September 1951 in the Pullman School's former buildings. It started with a freshman class of 360 students. The school was named for Gregor Mendel, an Augustinian priest and father of modern genetics. Construction on a gym, chapel, and monastery began in March 1953. By the beginning of the 1953–1954 school year, 900 students were enrolled with 127 on the waiting list.

In 1967, Black students threatened a walkout of the school to protest racial slurs, lack of Black representation in the student senate, and lack of Black history in the school's curriculum. The walkout was called off after discussion with Fr. George Clements, an African-American priest from nearby St. Dorothy's Parish.

Robert Prevost—the future Pope Leo XIV—occasionally taught math part-time at the school during his time at Catholic Theological Union. His mother, Mildred Prevost, was a librarian at Mendel and his older brothers attended the school.

In 1975, the school began to host weekly house dances, averaging around 1,000 students in attendance. As the school began to suffer from declining enrollment due to white flight, the dances generated $15 million in revenue for the school.

=== St. Martin de Porres High School ===
At the end of the 1987-1988 school year, Mendel consolidated with Unity Catholic High School and Willibrord Catholic High School to form St. Martin dePorres High School. The combined school continued to operate on the Mendel campus until its closing in 1997.

=== Closure and future ===
In 1997, the Archdiocese of Chicago sold the school to Chicago Public Schools for $2.8 million ($5.62 million in 2025). In 1998, the school reopened as Southside College Preparatory Academy, which changed its name to Gwendolyn Brooks College Preparatory Academy in 2001.

== Notable alumni ==
- Howard Brookins, alderman of Chicago
- Peter Cetera, former lead singer of the band Chicago
- John and Louis Prevost, brothers of Pope Leo XIV
- Greg Smith, Minnesota Vikings defensive end in 1984
- Rick Stelmaszek, Major League Baseball catcher
- John J. “Tim” Phelan, president and business manager of IUOE Local 399, general vice president of the International Union of Operating Engineers, and president of the AFL-CIO’s Chicago Port Council.
- Frank Zuccarelli, American politician
