= Prevo =

Prevo may refer to:

- Jerry Prevo (born 1945), American academic administrator and retired Baptist minister
- Prevo Peak, stratovolcano located in the central part of Simushir Island, Kuril Islands, Russia

== See also ==
- Prevost (disambiguation)
