= Prévot =

Prévot (English: /ˈprɛvoʊ/, French: [pʁevo]) is a French surname that may refer to:

- André Romain Prévot (1894–1982), French bacteriologist
- Charles-Victor Prévot, vicomte d'Arlincourt (1788–1856), French novelist
- Pauline Ferrand-Prévot (born 1992), French cyclist
- Prévôt, government official of the Ancien Régime (provost)

== Seel also ==
- Provost (name)
