= Family of Pope Leo XIV =

Prevost family Prévost Riggitano
- Family
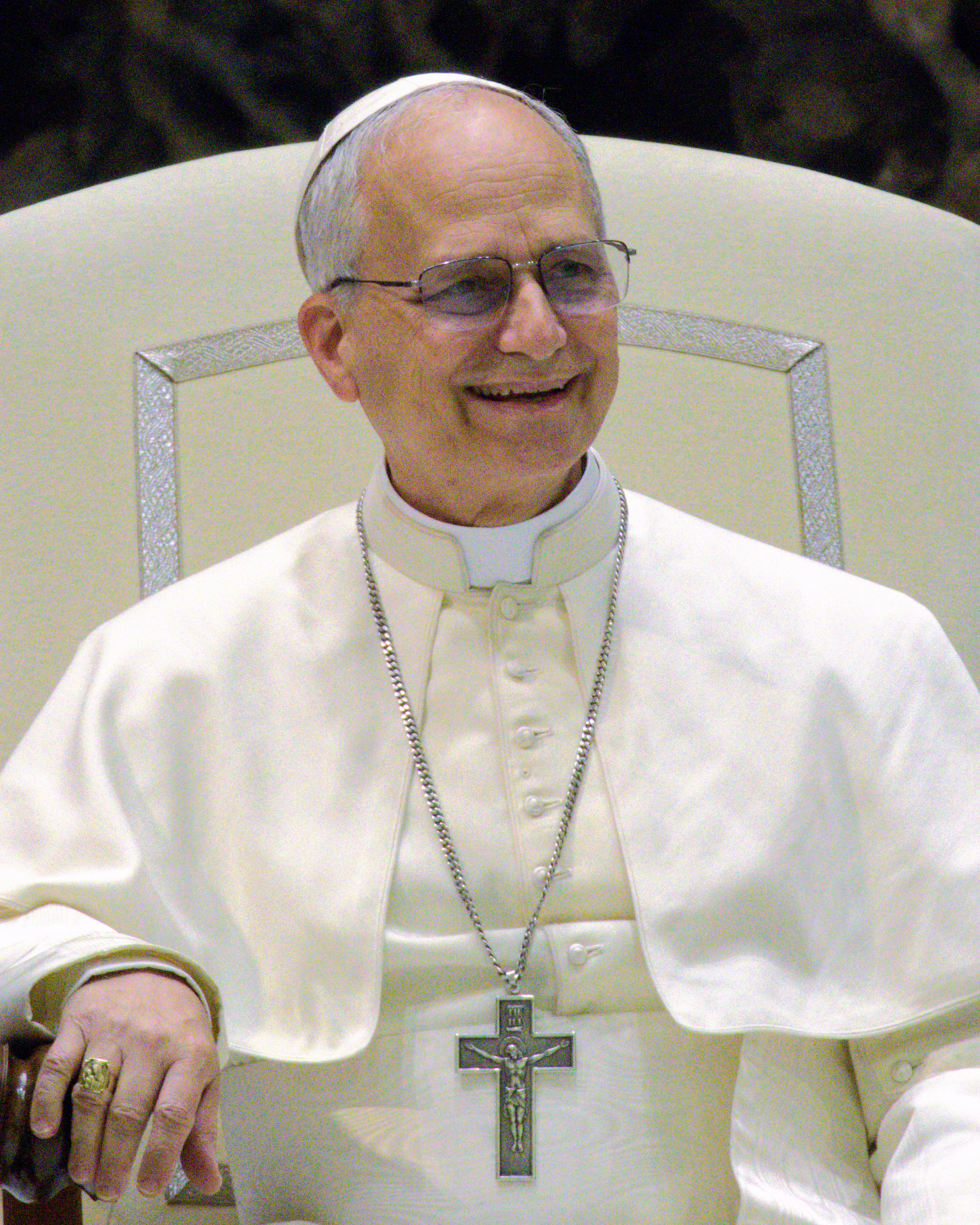
- Pope Leo XIV, born Robert Francis Prevost
- Etymology: Provost
- Origin: France; Italy; Spain; Louisiana
- Members: Pope Leo XIV

Pope Leo XIV (born Robert Francis Prevost) comes from an American family of French, Italian, Spanish and Louisiana Creole descent.

The surname "Prevost" (originally "Prévost") is from a French cognate (Note: Modern French: prévôt, 'provost'. See also Piedmontese: prevòst and Italian: prevosto, 'priest'.) of the title "provost", originally from the Latin praepositus '[one] placed in charge'. Leo XIV's paternal grandfather originally bore the Italian surname "Riggitano", but he took the name Prevost and gave it to his sons. It was also the family name of the pope's French great-grandmother.

== Background ==
After the election of Pope Leo XIV, many media organizations began researching his family background and ancestry.

A documentary genealogical study of Pope Leo XIV's family, by Henry Louis Gates in collaboration with the American Ancestors genealogy society and the Cuban Genealogy Club of Miami, was published in The New York Times in June 2025. This study found that among the pope's known ancestors, "40 are from France, 24 are from Italy and 21 are from Spain," along with others born in Cuba, Hispaniola, and other parts of the Caribbean, or French Canada. At least seventeen of his maternal ancestors identified in Louisiana are described in documents as having some measure of Black African heritage (creoles of color) – the terms employed including mulatto, mulatress, mulâtress créole, free person of color, and quadroon.

The pope's paternal grandfather from Italy, and paternal grandmother from France, immigrated to Illinois in the United States near the turn of the 20th century. The pope's maternal grandparents migrated to Illinois from Louisiana in the early 1910s.

== Paternal relations ==
=== Louis Marius Prevost (1920–1997) ===
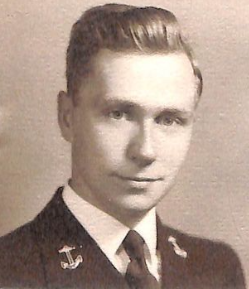
Louis Marius Prevost

Leo XIV's father, Louis Marius Prevost (born Louis Lanti Omarius Prevost; July 28, 1920 – November 8, 1997), was born in Chicago. He was raised at 5465 S. Ellis Avenue in the Hyde Park neighborhood on the city's South Side. He graduated from Woodrow Wilson Junior College in June 1940. Louis Prevost served in the United States Navy during World War II, commanding an infantry landing craft in the Normandy landings and later participated in Operation Dragoon in southern France. By the end of his 15-month deployment, he achieved the rank of lieutenant, junior grade. He received a Master of Arts degree from DePaul University in 1949. He later became superintendent of Brookwood School District 167 in Glenwood, Illinois. He was also a catechist. In 1949, he purchased a house at 212 East 141st Place in Dolton, Illinois, where he raised his three children. In 1964, he was serving as a reader and commentator at the transitional vernacular Mass after Vatican II. He died in Homewood on November 8, 1997, and was buried at Assumption Cemetery in Glenwood.

=== Paternal grandparents ===
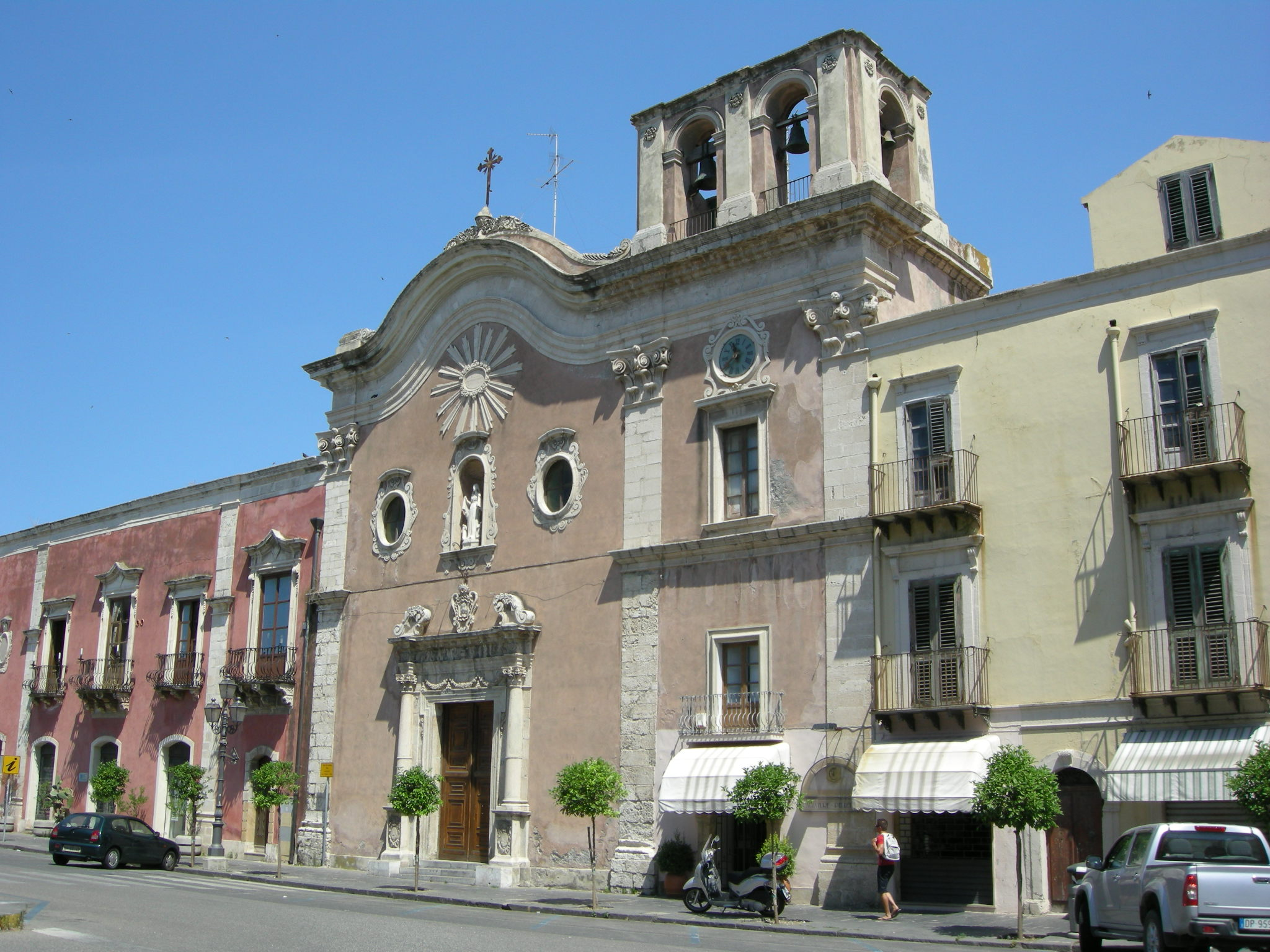
View of Milazzo, Metropolitan City of Messina, Sicily region, Italy, the town of origin of the paternal grandfather of Pope Leo XIV. His family name was originally Riggitano, later changed to Prevost once the family settled in the United States during the first Italian diaspora.

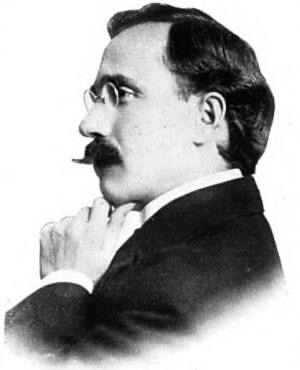
John Prevost (born Salvatore Giovanni Gaetano Riggitano), the Pope's paternal grandfather

Leo XIV's paternal grandparents were John Riggitano Prevost (born Salvatore Giovanni Gaetano Riggitano, June 24, 1876 – May 22, 1960), a Sicilian immigrant from Milazzo near Messina; and Suzanne Louise Marie Fontaine (February 2, 1894 – October 10, 1979), a French immigrant who was born in Le Havre, Normandy. Riggitano, born on June 24, 1876, to Santi and Maria (née Alioto), emigrated to the United States in 1903 during the first Italian diaspora, and settled in Illinois, where he worked as a teacher of music and language. Fontaine was born in 1894 to Jeanne-Eugénie (née Prévost) and Ernest-Auguste Fontaine. The latter was born on September 17, 1857, in Saint-Pierre-sur-Dives, Normandy region.

Riggitano and Fontaine were in a relationship by March 1917, when they were arrested for "unbecoming conduct" following a report from Riggitano's estranged wife, Daisy F. Hughes (August 8, 1875 – June 25, 1939); the affair was covered in local newspapers at the time. Fontaine gave birth to her and Riggitano's first son, John Centi—the uncle of Leo XIV—on July 23, 1917, and to Leo XIV's father, Louis, in 1920. The couple gave both boys the surname "Prevost" at birth and adopted it themselves; it had been Fontaine's mother's maiden name. Riggitano also changed his first name to "John". The couple were still together when Riggitano, now John Prevost, died in 1960. Suzanne Prevost died in a Detroit hospital on October 10, 1979, at the age of 83. Her death notice recorded that she was a member of the Third Order of Carmelites, a Catholic religious order of laypeople. The couple are buried at the Holy Sepulchre Cemetery in Alsip, Illinois.

== Maternal relations ==
=== Mildred Prevost (1911–1990) ===
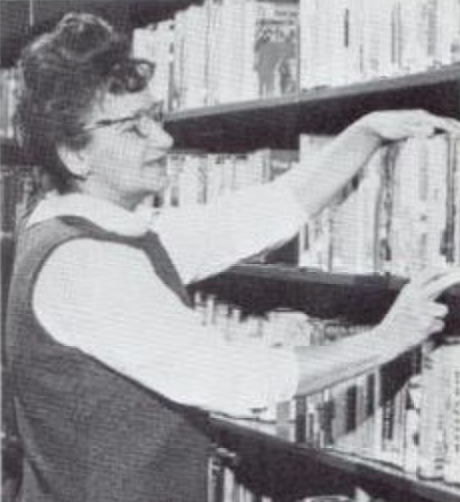
Mildred "Millie" Prevost, c. 1969

Leo XIV's mother, Mildred Agnes (née Martínez; December 30, 1911 (Note: The year is disputed; her gravestone lists her birth year as 1912, however baptismal records indicate she was baptized on February 4, 1912, with a birthdate of December 30, 1911.) – June 18, 1990), was born in Chicago to a Louisiana Creole family that had moved from the 7th Ward of New Orleans. After attending Immaculata High School on the North Side of Chicago, she graduated from DePaul University with a bachelor's degree in library science in 1947. She earned a master's degree in education in 1949. She married Louis Prevost, who was eight years younger than her, in her mid-30s. The couple had three sons: Louis, John, and Robert. She was an accomplished singer and performer, having her own recording of the Ave Maria, and competed in the 1941 Chicagoland Music Festival. She worked as an educator and librarian at Von Steuben High School and for Holy Name Cathedral. She was the librarian at Mendel Catholic High School in Roseland, Chicago in the 1970s, and her son, now Leo XIV, later taught there, as well.

Mildred Prevost died from cancer in 1990.

=== Maternal family ===
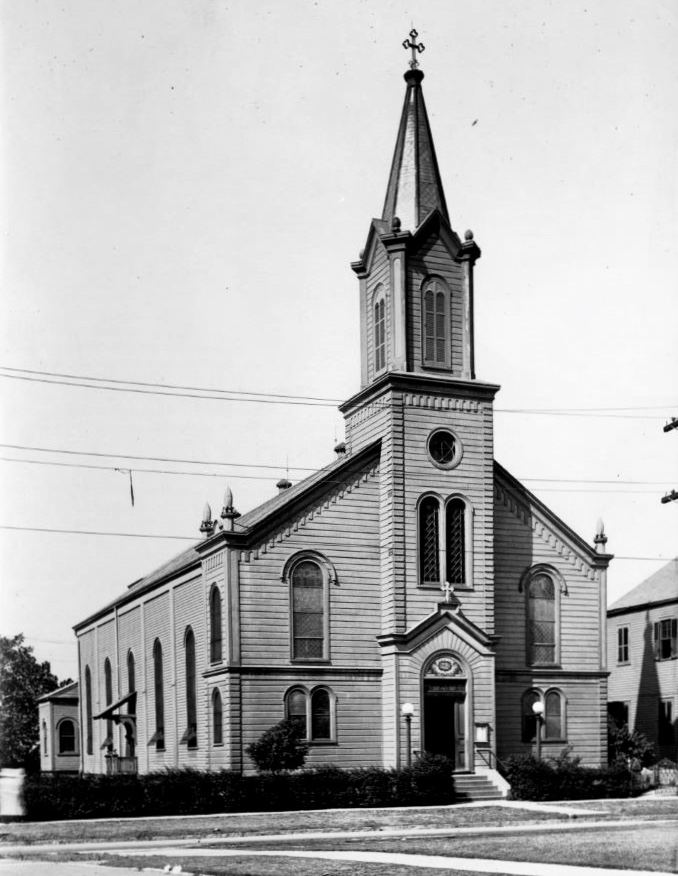
Joseph Martínez and Louise Baquié were married at Our Lady of the Sacred Heart in New Orleans.

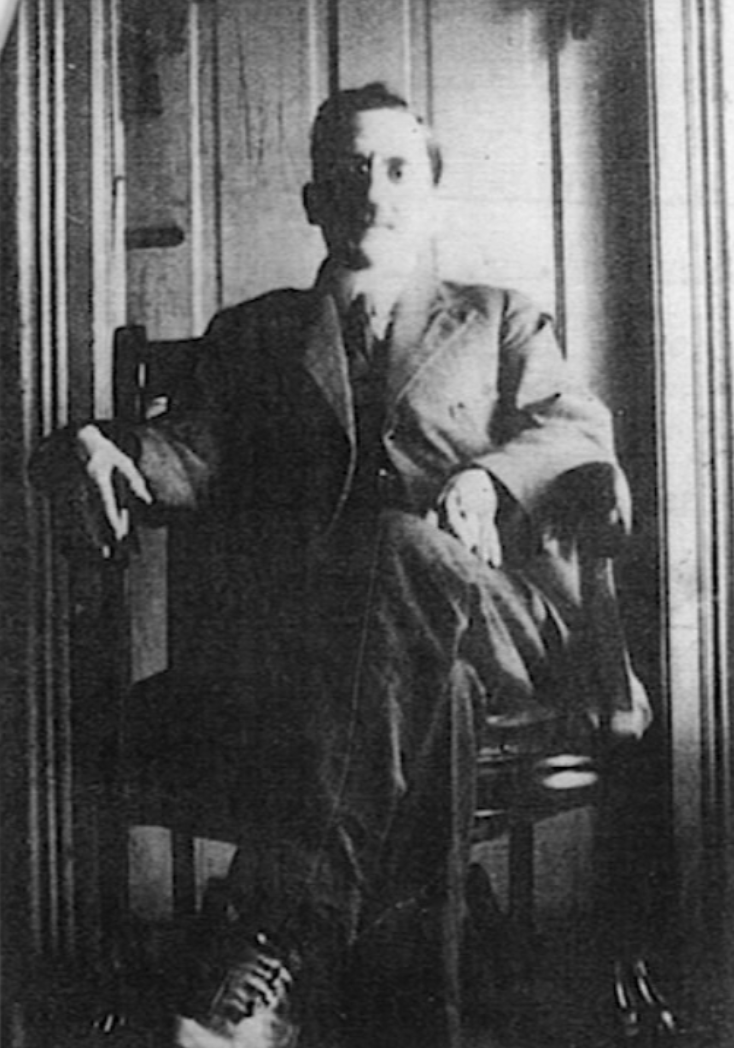
Joseph Martínez, the Pope's maternal grandfather

Leo XIV's maternal grandparents were the Hispaniola-born mixed-race Joseph Martínez (1864–1926), and the New Orleans-born Louise Baquié (also rendered Baquiex; 1868–1945), a mixed-race Black Creole. Joseph was born to Jacques and Marie Martínez in Santo Domingo, Dominican Republic (then under Spanish occupation). Jacques and Marie were registered on the 1910 United States census as Maltese and Spanish respectively; however, they may have done so to pass as white. Louise was born to Ferdinand Baquié and Eugénie Grambois in New Orleans. Joseph and Louise married on September 17, 1887, at Our Lady of the Sacred Heart in New Orleans.

In census documents, Joseph and Louise are variably described as Black or mulatto (mixed-race, of African and European heritage). In the 1900 United States census, when they lived in New Orleans, they are listed as Black. However, in the 1920 United States census after they had moved to Chicago, they are listed as white. Genealogist Chris Smothers speculated that such a change may have been a "survival strategy" if they passed as white.

Joseph and Louise had six daughters: Irma, Marguerite, Lydia, Mildred, Ethel, Louise, and Hilda. Louise and Hilda would become religious sisters and take the names Sister Mary Sulpice Martinez, R.S.M. and Sister Mary Amarita B.V.M., respectively. Sister Mary Amarita, born November 26, 1906, took her first vows on August 15, 1928, and served as a music teacher in Iowa, Oregon, and Illinois before her 1945 death. Sister Mary Sulpice died in 1999.

Joseph and Louise owned a home in New Orleans's 7th Ward, which was later demolished to construct a highway bypass. Some time between 1910 and 1912, the family moved to Chicago.

==== Earlier ancestors ====
Ferdinand David Baquié, Leo XIV's great-grandfather, was born in New Orleans on October 10, 1837. He married Eugénie Grambois on September 19, 1864. Ferdinand's mother was Céleste Lemelle, the daughter of Louis Lemelle and Céleste Olimpie Grandpres, who were married in Opelousas, Louisiana, in 1798, and were classified as quadroons, having one-fourth either African or Native American ancestry. Ancestors included both slaves and slave owners.

Céleste Olimpie Grandpres was a daughter of Charles Louis Boucher de Grand Pré and great-great-granddaughter of Pierre Boucher. Charles's father and Céleste's grandfather was Louis Boucher de Grandpré, born in 1695 in Trois-Rivières, Quebec. It is through Grandpré that Leo XIV is related to "numerous" distant cousins with French Canadian ancestry, "including Pierre and Justin Trudeau, Angelina Jolie, Hillary Clinton, Justin Bieber, Jack Kerouac and Madonna."

Louisiana newspaper Avoyelles Journal proposed a theory according to which his great-grandfather Jacques Martínez was the son of Giacomo (Jacques) Martino (1806–1852), an Italian immigrant from Sanremo, Liguria (at the time in the First French Empire), and Marguerite Cadeneth (1799–1870), a Creole from East Feliciana Parish, Louisiana. The family name would have changed from Martino to Martínez in New Orleans.

== Siblings ==
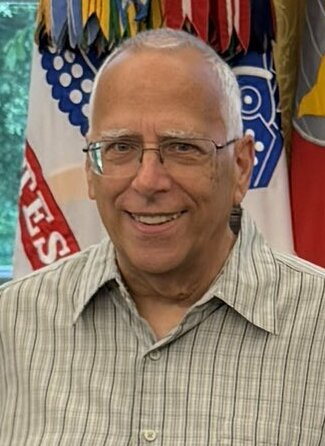
Louis Prevost at the Oval Office of the White House (May 20, 2025)

Leo XIV is the youngest of three brothers.

=== Louis Prevost ===
Louis Martín Prevost (born 1951) is Leo XIV's eldest brother. As a child, he was an altar server. He is a Navy veteran who lives in Florida. After attending Mendel Catholic High School, graduating in 1969, Louis was drafted into the Navy in college, and later studied computer technology. Louis is a vocal critic of the Democratic Party, having shared numerous posts on Facebook supporting the MAGA movement. He states that he and his brother, Leo XIV, know each other's political views, and they have had disagreements on certain topics. He is married to Deborah Prevost.

In October 2026, it was made public that Louis Prevost had been diagnosed with multiple myeloma.

=== John Prevost ===
John Joseph Prevost (born 1953) is the middle brother in the Prevost family; he is two years younger than Louis Prevost, but two years older than Leo XIV. He is a retired educator who lives in New Lenox, Illinois, having followed in his father's footsteps to pursue a career in education. Prevost attended Mendel Catholic High School, graduating in 1972. He worked in Catholic schools for 35 years, including 27 years as a principal, some of which was at St. Gabriel Catholic School in Chicago. John Prevost was the subject of a hoax bomb threat in April 2026.
