= Jacobus van de Water =

Mayor of New Amsterdam c. 1673

Jacobus Benjamin van de Water was mayor and "auditeur" of the city of New Amsterdam ca. 1673.

Van de Water was born in about 1643 to Benjamin Jacobus Van de Water, and Eijsbet de Meersman, from Rotterdam. His father died in Amsterdam on 23 January 1653 and his mother married, second, Walewijn van der Veen in Amsterdam 23 April 1654. They emigrated to America settling in New Amsterdam after the birth of his half sister in Amsterdam in 1655. He himself followed in 1658. Once settled, Jacobus Van de Water married Engeltje Jurriaens.
