= Prouvost =

Prouvost is a surname. Notable people with the surname include:

- Amédée Prouvost (1877–1909), French poet
- Évelyne Prouvost (1939–2017), French businesswoman
- Gustave Prouvost (1887–?), French water polo player
- Jean Prouvost (1885–1978), French businessman, media owner and politician
- Laure Prouvost (born 1978), French artist
