= David Provoost =

American colonist

David Provoost or David Prévost was a prominent citizen of New Amsterdam, New Netherland, where he worked many years for the West India Company His main occupation was trade when he was not working for the government He was the original grantee, in 1639, of a considerable parcel of land in New Amsterdam where he resided for some time before moving to Long Island. where it is presumed he died. In the Iconography of Manhattan Island, it is mentioned that he died in Breukelen, now Brooklyn

His grandson David Provost became the 24th mayor of New York. His great-grandson, Samuel Provoost, became the first bishop of New York.

== Early life and family ==
David Provoost was born in Amsterdam on 11 August 1611. His parents were Guillaume (Wilhelmus) Provoost and Janneken (Jenne) Eerdewijn. His grandfather was William Provoost William Provost He married Margrieta Jelis (also known as Gillis or Jelus)on 11 July 1637. The Provoost family, original spelling being Prévost, were of Huguenot descent.

== Children ==
Margaret, born on the 24 January 1641, married Pieter Janszen Scholt.

David, born on the 20 November 1642, married Tryntje (Catherine) Laurens.

Benjamin and Elias, twins, born 17 June 1646. Benjamin married Sara Barents and 2nd Elsje Albertszen.

Samuel, born 22 November 1648. Died young.

Jonathan, born 26 March 1651, married Catrina van der Veen, daughter of Walewijn van der Veen and Elisabet Meersman.

Barber (Barbara) born 30 November 1653, married Jan Aukesz van Nuys.

Gillis, born 1656, married Mary Hibon.

== First voyage to New Netherland ==
His first voyage from Holland to New Netherland was in 1624, two years before the Island of Manhattan was purchased from the Native Americans. He returned to Holland after some years and married Margrietje Jelis (Gillis) 11 July 1637 in Amsterdam.

== Second voyage to New Netherland ==
The second voyage to New Netherland was before April 1639, perhaps with Governor Kieft and his company in March 1638. Near the river shore, he partially cleared the land and built a farm house at a point which is believed to be in the interior of the block between the modern Pearl and Water Streets, Dover Street and Peck Slip. The area also comprised City Hall Park. East of the house and extending from the river's shore up to the present Franklin Square, was a small cherry and apple orchard, long afterwards famous as "the Cherry Garden," the trees of which may very likely have been set out by Provoost himself. They are still commemorated by the Cherry Street of the present day.

Provoost spoke Dutch, English, French, Latin and languages of several of the Native American tribes. On September 20, 1639, he made a contract to purchase 500 Schepels from the Native Americans. In 1640 he was appointed Commissary of Provisions and Tobacco Inspector by Governor Kieft.

On 17 August 1641, he made a contract with Jeuriaen Hendricksen to work on his house on Long Island. The description is found here: Further documents can be found in vol I and vol II of the New York Historical Manuscripts translated by Arnold J.F. van Laer

== Fort Good Hope ==
In April 1642, he was appointed commander of Fort Good Hope(Dutch:'Huys de Goede Hoop') in Hartford, Connecticut page 13, where he was in charge of 50-60 men that were to take command of the Fresh River known today as the Connecticut River. The English had settlements in the area and there were, on occasion, disputes between the Dutch and the English. However, Provoost's diplomatic ability as well as his speedy and brave acts of retaliation were warmly approved of Governor Kieft. Biographical and Genealogical Notes of the Provoost Family An incident was described where a Native American captive of the English that was subject to public punishment had escaped her English master in Hartford and sought refuge in the Dutch Fort Good Hope. Here she was protected by David Provoost and he refused to deliver her when English authorities sent a dispatch to get her back. This invasion, of what he deemed his just jurisdiction, was successfully resisted by Provoost who drawes and breakes his Rapier upon their weapons, and then withdrew into the fort, where he defended himself with impunity.

On 2 February 1652, his name is at the head of the board of Nine Men of the city of New Amsterdam. These men met in the schoolroom of David Provoost and were the first to dispute the autocratic powers of the governor They were the precursors of the aldermen and commissioners.

It is documented that he was also a school master in Manhattan as early as 1645. As well as these different vocations, he acted as counsellor and attorney. In this capacity he was found attending suits before the aldermen and magistrates. page 17.

David Provoost became Notary Public 16 September 1652.

He was appointed the first Schout (Sheriff) of Breuckelen and Amersfoort. as early as 1654. He died on Long Island in 1656.
