= Prevost (surname) =

Prevost is a surname which ultimately comes from the Latin praepositus. The French name Prevost (or Prévost) is derived from the Old French word prevost, meaning "provost". The Northwest Italian name is derived from the Piedmontese or Lombard prevòst, customarily meaning 'parish priest'. The English name has two etymologies: it is either of French Huguenot origin from the French name; or it is an occupational name of English origin from the Middle English prevost or prefost, which are cognates with the French.

Notable people with the surname include:

- Abbé Prévost (1697–1763), French novelist
- André Prévost (composer) (1934–2001), Canadian composer
- Augustine Prevost (1723–1786), British general
- Charles Prévost (chemist) (1899–1983), French chemist
- Codie Prevost (born 1984), Canadian country singer
- Constant Prévost (1787–1856), French geologist
- Daniel Prévost (born 1939), French actor
- Eddie Prévost (born 1942), English percussionist
- Eugène Prévost (carpenter) (1898–1965), founder of Prevost Car
- Eugène Prévost (cyclist) (1863–1961), French cyclist
- Eugène Prévost (musician) (1809–1872), French composer and conductor
- Florent Prévost (1794–1870), French naturalist
- Françoise Prévost (dancer) (1680–1741), French dancer
- Françoise Prévost (actress) (1930–1997), French actress
- Gédéon-Mélasippe Prévost (1817–1887), Canadian notary and politician
- George Prevost (1767–1816), British general and governor
- George Prevost McKay (1840–1924), Canadian business executive and politician
- Hippolyte Prévost (1808–1873), inventor of a stenography system; see Théodore-Pierre Bertin
- Isaac-Bénédict Prévost (1755–1819), Swiss theologian, plant pathologist and naturalist
- James Charles Prevost (1810–1891), British admiral
- Jean Prévost (1901–1944), French writer and Resistance fighter
- Jean Prévost (politician) (1870–1915), Canadian lawyer, journalist and politician
- Jean-Louis Prévost (1838–1927), Swiss neurologist and physiologist
- Jean-Louis Prévost (1790–1850), French botanical artist
- Joël Prévost (1950–2024), French singer
- Leonardo Prevost (born 1971), Cuban sprinter
- Louis Prévost de Sansac (1496–1576), a Marshal of France
- Lucien-Anatole Prévost-Paradol (1829–1870), French journalist and essayist
- Madame Prévost (fl. 1830) French pioneer florist
- Marcel Prévost (1862–1941), French writer
- Marie Prevost (1896–1937), Canadian actress
- Maurice Prévost (1887–1948), French pioneer aviator
- Michael Prevost (born 1953), German-Canadian boxer
- Michèle Prévost (born 1955), Canadian civil engineer
- Nicholas Le Prevost (born 1947), English actor
- Pierre Prévost (physicist) (1751–1839), Swiss philosopher and physicist
- Pierre André Prévost de La Prévostière, French politician, governor general of Pondicherry
- Robert Prévost (1927–1982), Canadian set designer
- Robert Francis Prevost (born 1955), American-Peruvian Catholic prelate of the Order of Saint Augustine; elected Pope Leo XIV in 2025
- Victor Prevost (1820–1881), American photographer
- Wilfrid Prévost (1832–1898), Canadian lawyer and politician
- Yves Prévost (1908–1997), Canadian lawyer and politician
- Yvonne Prévost (1878–1942), French tennis player

== See also ==
- Family of Pope Leo XIV, with various individuals surnamed Prevost
- Prevost baronets, title in the Baronetage of the United Kingdom
