= Walewijn van der Veen =

Lawyer and notary public in Netherlands in 17th century

Walewyn (Walewijn) van der Veen, was born in 1617 and died sometime after 1679 in New York. He was one of the first lawyers and Notaries Public in New Amsterdam 1662–1664. The Register of New Netherland 1626-1674 by E.B. O Callaghan LL.D, Page 123. He succeeded the lawyer Salomon LaChaire 1661–1662. In 1664 New Amsterdam came under English rule and the named changed to New York. Walewijn van der Veen petitioned the provincial council for admission as Notary Public on October 27, 1661, and was officially sworn in on January 19, 1662. His workplace was in the old Town Hall or Stadt Huys built in 1642. The building was situated in Manhattan, on the corner of Pearl Street and Coenties Alley.

== Early life and family ==
Walewijn was born in Deventer in the Netherlands. His mother was Aeltgen Jans van Drillenborgh. His father was Walewijn van der Veen, a school master who opened a French school in Deventer on May 27, 1584, that taught speaking, reading and writing in that language. He belonged to the Remonstrant movement that supported Arminianism. On 14 December 1619 Walewijn van der Veen had to appear before the Deventer magistrates and sign a petition to support the Canons of Dort, which he refused. He was therefor allowed to continue teaching in his school, only if he refrained from teaching religion page 314.

Walewijn had the following siblings:

- Jan van der Veen. Dichter, Poet who married Thonnisken (Antonia) Ruirkinck in Deventer on March 14, 1626. Their daughter, Antonia, married the famous Dutch Golden Age painter Pieter van Anraedt in Utrecht on 18 January 1663
- Janneken Walewijns van der Veen who married Henrik Schoemaker van Coesvelt in Deventer on July 24, 1632
- Arent van der Veen who married Maria Pijls in Utrecht on February 10, 1629
- Johanna van der Veen

=== Children ===
Catrina van der Veen was the only child of Walewijn. She was born in Amsterdam and baptized in the Westerkerk on 12 March 1655 Her first marriage was to Frans Jansen van der Meulen from The Hague. He died in 1677 and Catrina later married Jonathan Provoost in New York on 26 December 1679. He was the son of David Provoost and Margrieta Jelus.

His stepson Jacobus van de Water became mayor of New York in 1673.

Walewijn was an uncle of the Dutch Golden Age landscape painter Balthasar van der Veen.

In the register of the marriage to his second wife Elisabet de Meersman, widow of Benjamin Jacobus van de Water, in Amsterdam on 23 April 1654, Walewijn was living in the Nieuwendijk.

=== Work ===
He began working for the West India Company as merchant and attorney and travelled between Amsterdam and New Netherland. He first appears in records in New Amsterdam on 26 June 1656 prosecuting Allard Anthony on the matter of Benjamin van de Water's estate. He was later that year entrusted by governor Petrus Stuyvesant with carrying the plan of the development of the South River known today as the Delaware River, to the Dutch West India Company in Amsterdam. The ship on which he sailed, the 'Otter', was lost off the coast of Devon, England, on 15 November 1656. Apparently most people survived. He returned to New Amsterdam in 1658 with proxies from several people to collect debts. He then stayed in New Amsterdam doing trade on consignment and acted as attorney for Adriaen Blommaert, who was an important merchant and ship master.

The original manuscripts of Walewijn van der Veen in the old Dutch language are kept in the New York Department of Records and Information Services They are from a period of early New York and are therefore of historical importance. Students, historians and genealogists are able to see court cases, banns of matrimony, powers of attorney, indentures of apprentices, debts, mortgages, deeds, conveyances of real estate, testaments and wills in early New Netherland. An example of a will executed by a couple with Walewyn van der Veen as the Notary is mentioned in a paper published by the New York Historical Society: 'The Old Stadt Huys of New Amsterdam: A paper read before the New York Historical Society June 15, 1875' by James W. Gerard page 34.

An English translation was made of these manuscripts in 1862 by Dr.E.B. O'Callaghan but was not published. However, in 1907, a book in two volumes by Berthold Fernow was published which gives the translation of these historical records into English.

Some Information on family background and work was provided for by the director, David William Voorhees of the Jacob Leisler Institute
