= Provost (civil) =

Civic heads of local governments in Scotland

Provost is a title held by the civic heads of local governments in Scotland. It is similar in use to the title of mayor in other parts of the English-speaking world.

In the 32 current unitary councils in Scotland, the title is often used for the convenor or civic head of a council, elected by its members to chair meetings and to represent the council. While convenor and depute convenor are the titles used in statute for this position, councils are generally permitted to choose their own titles for their civic heads. However, in the cities of Aberdeen, Dundee, Edinburgh and Glasgow, the title is specified in law as Lord Provost, who also performs the role of lord-lieutenant for the area.

The title of provost is derived from the French term prévôt, which has origins in the Roman Empire. In the past, it was associated with the principal magistrates of Scotland's burghs, but it has since been used in a range of local authorities and community councils, as well as former district councils.

== Origins ==
The title of provost was introduced to Scotland from the French term prévôt (French pronunciation: [pʁeˈvoː]), similarly to the title's military use in the English language. It has its origins in the Latin term ''praepositus, which as a civil title in the Roman Empire dates back to the praepositus sacri cubiculi (provost of the sacred bedchamber). A position of praepositus palatii was held in the Carolingian court.

== Local government ==
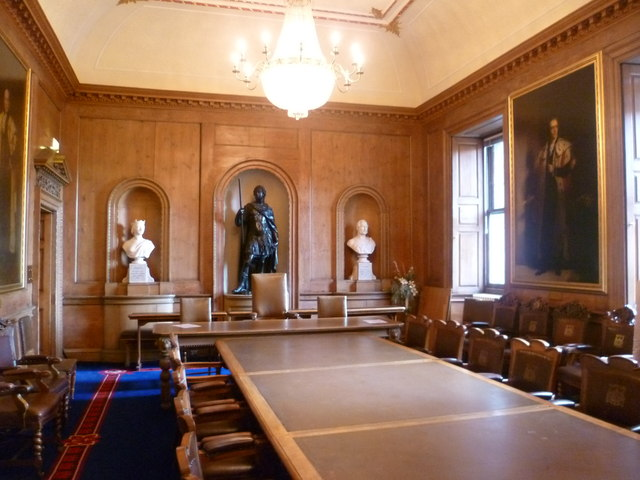
Edinburgh City Council's Chamber. The Lord Provost of Edinburgh would sit in the chair in front of the statue, in the centre of the image.

A provost was the chief magistrate or convenor of a burgh council, the equivalent of a mayor in other parts of the United Kingdom and in Ireland.

Before the enactment of the Town Councils (Scotland) Act 1900 various titles were used in different burghs, but the legislation standardised the name of the governing body as “the provost, magistrates, and councillors” of the burgh. After the reorganisation of local government in Scotland in 1975, the title of Lord Provost was reserved to Aberdeen, Dundee, Edinburgh and Glasgow, while other district councils could choose the title to be used by the convenor; in 1994 twenty-two councils had provosts.

Similar provisions were included in the Local Government etc. (Scotland) Act 1994, which established the 32 current unitary council areas in 1996. Members of each council elect one of their number to convene meetings of the council, and that person is generally designated convenor or provost.

=== Role ===
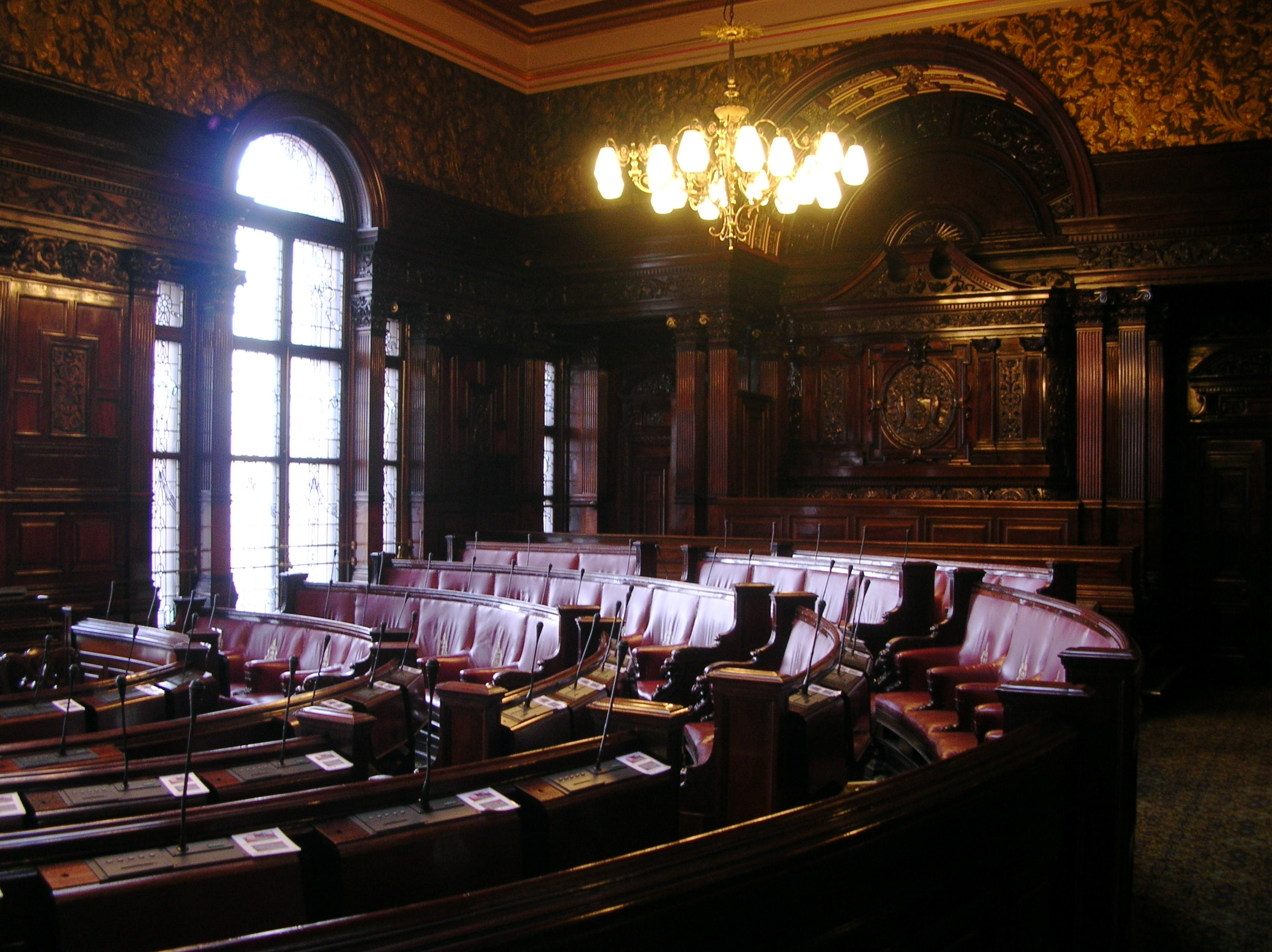
Glasgow City Council's chamber. The Lord Provost of Glasgow would sit in the chair at the centre of the hemicycle, in the far-left of the image.

A provost, as civic head of a council, chairs council meetings, and represents the council on civic and ceremonial occasions.

The Scottish Provosts Association is a membership organisation established in 2014 for provosts and civic heads of local authorities who may use different titles.

A provost or convenor of a local authority is paid a salary greater than the basic pay received by a councillor. The salary of the convenor, leader of the council and senior councillors is set across Scotland, with variation between councils on a banding system. A council's place on one of the four salary bands is based on a number of factors, including the size of the council's budget.

=== Election ===
As a convenor of a council, the provost presides over council meetings. The first order of business for any local authority following an election of councillors is the appointment of a convenor and depute convenor from among their number.

The Scottish Conservatives and former Prime Minister Gordon Brown have proposed provosts directly elected by the public, with executive authority similar to that of directly elected local authority mayors in England.

=== Community councils ===
The Local Government (Scotland) Act 1973 provided for the creation of community councils in Scotland to represent the interests of communities, particularly to their local authorities. A number of these community councils share boundaries similar to those of historic burgh councils and several have chosen to style their chairpersons as provosts.

In 2019 the Royal Burgh of St Andrews Community Council reintroduced the title of Provost for its chairman when performing ceremonial and ambassadorial duties, in anticipation of the marking in 2020 of the 400th Anniversary of the granting of Royal Burgh status by King James VI & I in 1620.

== Chains of office ==
Traditionally, provosts have chains of office, which are often valuable items of jewellery bearing an authority's coat of arms.

== In fiction ==
In The Cadfael Chronicles series of historical detective novels by Ellis Peters, which take place in 12th-century Shrewsbury, England, an important role is played by the town's Provost, a prominent shoemaker.

The Provost plays an important role in William Shakespeare's Measure for Measure. He is promoted at the end of the play.

== See also ==
- Bailie
- Provost (disambiguation)
- Provost marshal
