= Greg Smith (American football, born 1959) =

American football player (born 1959)

No. 91
- Position: Defensive end

Personal information
- Born: October 22, 1959 (age 67); Chicago, Illinois, U.S.
- Listed height: 6 ft 3 in (1.91 m)
- Listed weight: 270 lb (122 kg)

Career information
- High school: Mendel Catholic (Chicago)
- College: Kansas (1977–1981)
- NFL draft: 1982: 7th round, 184th overall pick

Career history
- Kansas City Chiefs (1982)*; Minnesota Vikings (1984)
- * Offseason or practice squad member only

Awards and highlights
- Second-team All-Big Eight (1981)

Career NFL statistics
- Games played: 16
- Games started: 6
- Stats at Pro Football Reference

Gregory Smith (born October 22, 1959) is an American former professional football player who was a defensive lineman in the National Football League (NFL) from 1982 to 1984. Born in Chicago, he attended Mendel Catholic High School and played college football for the Kansas Jayhawks before being selected by the Kansas City Chiefs in the seventh round (184th overall) of the 1982 NFL draft. By the 1984 season, he had moved to the Minnesota Vikings, and he appeared in all 16 of the team's games that year, starting six times. Despite being a defensive end, he had two kick returns for a total of 26 yards, with a long of 15.
