= Cherry Street (Manhattan) =

Street in Manhattan, New York

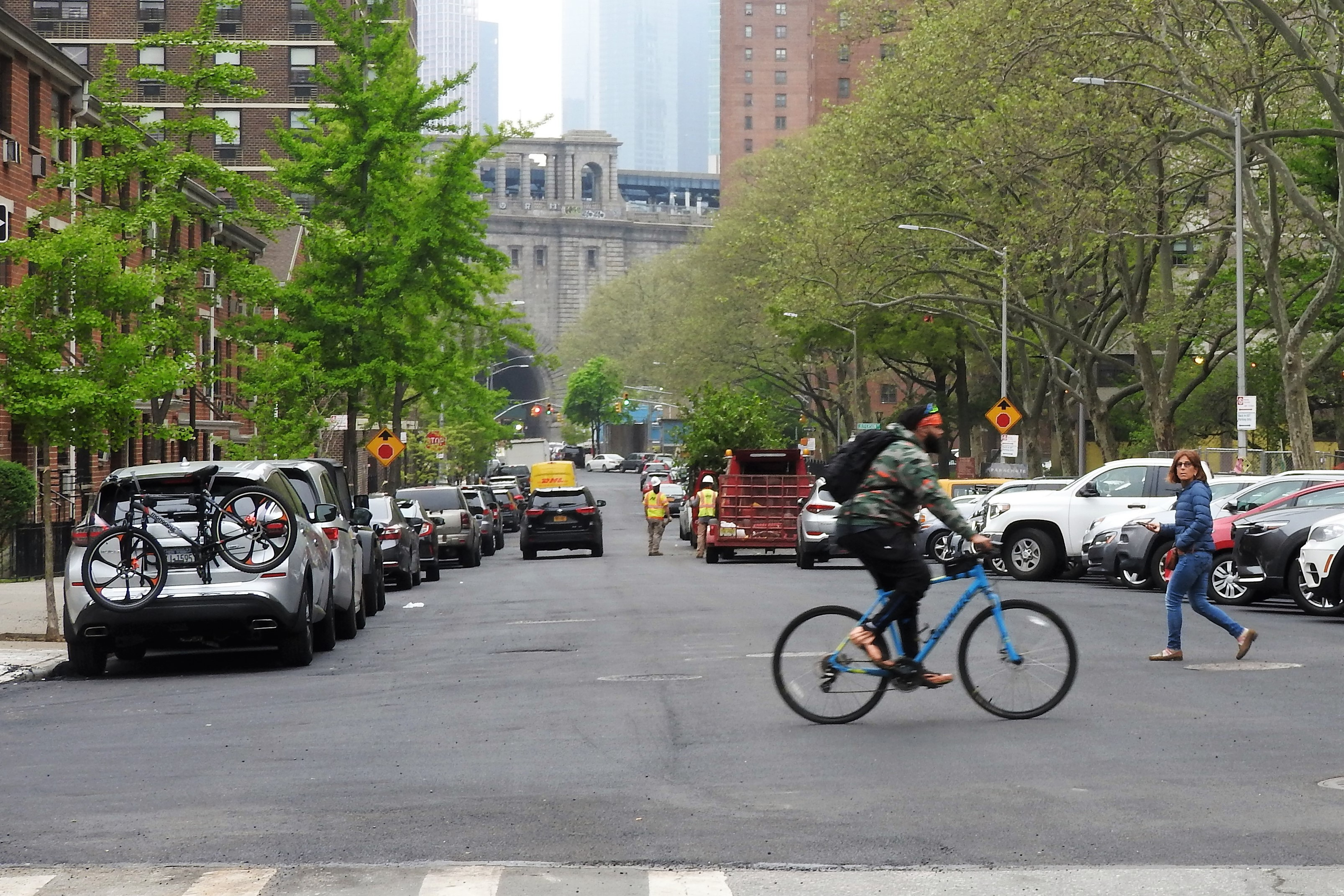
- Looking west from Clinton Street towards Manhattan Bridge

- Location within Manhattan
- Namesake: David Provoost's cherry orchard
- Type: One-way
- Location: Manhattan, New York City, U.S.
- Coordinates: 40.7114°N 73.9889°W
- From: Intersection of FDR Drive/Grand Street
- To: Intersection of Catherine Street/Slip

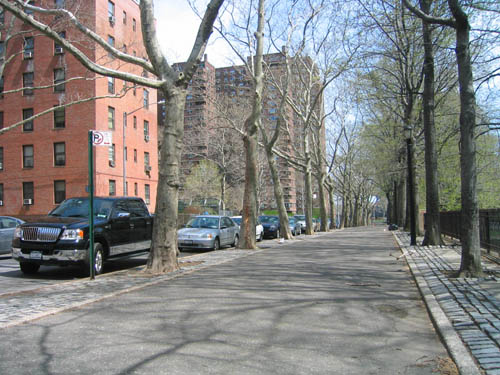
East end of Cherry Street, Vladeck Houses and Corlear's Hook Park

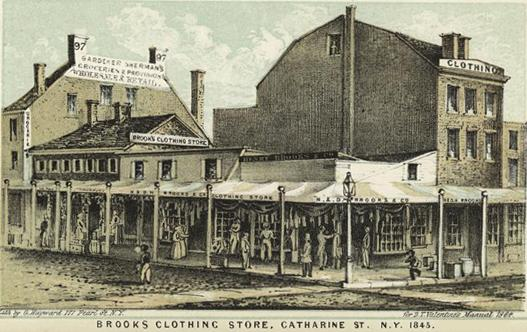
Cherry and Catherine Streets, 1848

Cherry Street is a one-way street in the New York City borough of Manhattan. It currently has two sections, mostly running along parks, public housing, co-op buildings, tenements, and crossing underneath the Manhattan Bridge.

== Description ==
Cherry Street's eastern terminus is at the intersection of FDR Drive's southbound service road and Grand Street, where it bends right and turns into Cherry Street. It then runs west for one block, along the north edge of Corlears Hook Park, to Jackson Street. Then it is demapped for approximately two blocks, from Jackson Street to Gouvernour Street and Gouvernour Street to Montgomery Street (with the Vladeck Houses built over demapped section). It continues west, running parallel to the FDR Drive and one block north of it, for three blocks, to Pike Street/Slip. Afterward, it runs west from Pike, under the Manhattan Bridge access ramp, one block to Market Street; Cherry Street then goes one block further west, parallel to and one block north of Water Street. Cherry Street has its western terminus here, at its intersection with Catherine Street/Slip.

The M14A SBS and M22 buses use the eastern portion of Cherry Street to begin westbound service from the FDR Drive. On the western portion, the F train crosses on Rutgers Street, while the B, D, N, and Q trains cross it on the Manhattan Bridge.

== History ==
Cherry Street was originally established in colonial times to run from the intersection of Pearl Street and Frankfort Street in Lower Manhattan, approximately 1.44 miles (2.32 km) east to Grand Street in Corlear's Hook. The section between Pearl Street and Catherine Street was removed block-by-block due to development, starting with the building of the Brooklyn Bridge in the 1860s. Before various sections were removed, part of the surrounding neighborhood was known as Cherry Hill. The removed section now contains the Alfred E. Smith Houses.

The section between Jackson Street and Montgomery Street, was also removed and demapped to provide for Vladeck Park. Vladeck Park was subsequently replaced with Vladeck Houses, a public housing building complex project.

The two demapped sections left a "widowed" one block stretch of Cherry at the eastern end, from Montgomery to the FDR Drive South service lane, which bends into Cherry Street as it ends. Prior to the constructions of the FDR, both Cherry Street and Grand Street extended a short distance further east than they now do, and met each other at the riverbank.

A possible Lenape canoe, the only dugout ever found in Manhattan, was excavated by New York Edison workers in 1906 in Cherry Hill by the intersection with Oliver Street, at the original shoreline.

The street was named for the 7-acre (28,000 m^{2}) cherry orchard that was planted by David Provoost, who originally owned the land. His Manhattan farm consisted of about 35 acres. It was sold later to two men: Goovert Loockermans, a wealthy Dutch merchant who was the New Amsterdam representative of the Amsterdam trading firm of Gillis Verbrugge & Company in the 1660s and Cornelis Leeandertsen.

Cherry Street was renamed for Firefighter Robert Foti in honor of his sacrifice on September 11, 2001.

== Notable places ==
Loockermans' heirs sold the land in 1672 for $60.00. Richard Sackett acquired part of it, and opened a beer garden and a bowling green which became known as "Sackett's Orchard".

In 1785, the four-story mansion at 3 Cherry Street was leased by the Continental Congress to serve as the Executive Mansion for Richard Henry Lee, President of the Congress under the Articles of Confederation. It continued to serve as such for the next three Presidents and, in 1789 served as the first Executive Mansion for the President of the United States, George Washington, and Martha Washington. The mansion belonged to Col. Samuel Osgood, the first Postmaster General of the United States.

Another house on Cherry Street, later demolished, was the first gas-lit house in Manhattan, owned by Samuel Leggett, a founder of Con Edison. The house was served via gas pipe from Pearl Street. Though Cherry Street once ran through to Pearl Street, it has since been terminated at Catherine Street due to the Civic Square development.

In 1818, Henry Sands Brooks opened H. & D. H. Brooks & Co. on the northeast corner of Catherine and Cherry Streets in Manhattan "to make and deal only in merchandise of the finest body, to sell it at a fair profit, and to deal with people who seek and appreciate such merchandise." In 1850, his three sons, Elisha, Daniel, and John, inherited the family business and renamed the company "Brooks Brothers," which is the oldest men's clothier chain in the United States.

Young Irving Berlin lived at 330 Cherry Street with his family for years.

In the 1930s, the first "superproject" development proposal in New York City was initiated for the Cherry Street area of Corlear's Hook. The Vladeck Houses, 24 six-story buildings, built on the former Vladeck Park, were completed in 1940. They were a precursor to the larger Unit Plans for public housing that predominated in later decades, including the Alfred E. Smith Houses that occupy the other "lost" section of Cherry Street.

A $50 million renovation of the Vladeck Houses began in 1998. Cherry Street also traverses the Rutgers Houses and La Guardia Houses. All three of these large-scale housing projects are NYCHA developments.

Currently, the majority of structures along Cherry Street are residential co-op apartments, public housing, and older tenement buildings south of the Manhattan Bridge.
