= Provo =

Provo or Provos may refer to:

== Places ==
=== United States ===
- Provo, Kentucky, an unincorporated community

==== South Dakota ====
- Provo, South Dakota, an unincorporated community
- Provo Township, Fall River County, South Dakota

==== Utah ====
- Provo, Utah, a city
  - Provo Peak, a mountain within the city limits
- Provo Canyon, Utah
- Provo River, Utah

=== Elsewhere ===
- Provo, Livno, a village in Bosnia and Herzegovina
- Provo, Vladimirci, a village in Serbia
- Providenciales, often shortened to Provo locally, an island in the Turks and Caicos Islands

== People ==
- Saint Provos, another name for Saint Probus of Side (died c. 304 AD), a martyr of the Diocletian persecution
- Provo Wallis (1791–1892), British admiral of the fleet
- Dwayne Provo (born 1970), retired Canadian Football League player
- Fred Provo (1922–1999), America National Football League player in 1948

== Transportation ==
- Provo station (Amtrak), Amtrak inter-city rail station
- Provo station (Utah Transit Authority), Utah Transit Authority commuter rail and bus station
- Kia Provo, a 2013 South Korean concept subcompact hatchback

== Other uses ==
- Provo (movement), a Dutch counterculture movement in the mid-1960s
- Provisional Irish Republican Army, or Provos, a 1969–2005 paramilitary force
- USNS Provo (T-AG-173), a U.S. Navy ship
- Provo College, Provo, Utah
- Provo High School, Provo, Utah
- PROV-O, an OWL2 ontology allowing the mapping of the PROV data model to RDF
