= Gwendolyn Brooks College Preparatory Academy =

Gwendolyn Brooks College Prep
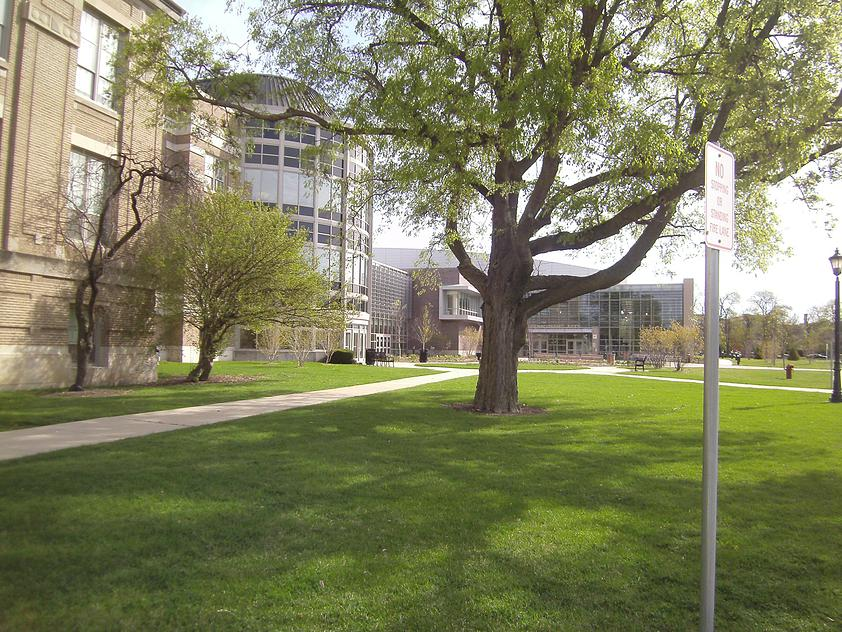

Location
- 250 E. 111th Street; Chicago, Illinois 60628; United States; 41.6940°N 87.6159°W

Information
- School type: Public; Secondary; Magnet
- Motto: "Be Brooks!"
- Opened: 1998
- School district: Chicago Public Schools
- CEEB code: 141297
- Principal: Shannae B. Jackson
- Grades: 7–12
- Gender: Coed
- Enrollment: 954 (2022–2023)
- Campus size: 40 acres (160,000 m^{2})
- Campus type: Urban
- Colors: Royal Blue; White
- Athletics conference: Chicago Public League
- Mascot: Bald eagle
- Team name: Eagles
- Accreditation: North Central Association of Colleges and Schools
- Website: brookscollegeprep.org

Gwendolyn Brooks College Preparatory Academy is a public four-year selective enrollment magnet high school and middle school located in the Roseland neighborhood, near the Pullman District on the far south side of Chicago, Illinois, United States. Opened in 1998, The school is operated by Chicago Public Schools district. A university-preparatory school, Brooks is named for African-American poet, author and Chicago native Gwendolyn Brooks.

== History ==
The site has been in use as a high school since 1915, though Brooks is the fourth high school to occupy the property. George Pullman, upon his death in 1897, bequeathed the sum of $1,200,000 to provide for the building and endowment of a "free school of manual training for the benefit of the children of persons living or employed at Pullman." An additional bequest was made by Mrs. Pullman, and the Pullman Free School of Manual Training opened its doors on the site in September 1915. The first year class welcomed 106 boys and girls. Although the town of Pullman had by this time become part of the city of Chicago, the school successfully fulfilled the intentions of its founder by serving the children of employees of the Pullman car works and the Pullman-Roseland communities. It was widely recognized at the time for excellence in vocational instruction and effective training of its students, all of whom were concurrently enrolled in core academic subjects such as English, math, and science.

By the late 1940s, the endowment that supported the school could no longer sustain the rising costs of the school's operation as it grew to a student enrollment of 600. According to Pullman's will, the school was prohibited from charging tuition. The school's board decided that the only practicable means of carrying out Pullman's intention was to divert the funds from the school into an educational scholarship foundation. The Free School closed in 1950. The school was immediately taken over by the Augustinians, who established Mendel Catholic High School. The Roman Catholic high school remained in operation from 1951 to 1988. In 1988, Mendel was closed as the school's population dropped, and the property was sold to the Archdiocese of Chicago, which opened St. Martin de Porres High School.

The diocesan school remained open only until 1997 because the school's population had continued to drop. The school and property were then sold to the Chicago Public Schools system, which opened the current school in 1998 as Southside College Preparatory Academy. In 2001, the school was named in honor of Gwendolyn Brooks, who was a South Side resident, former U.S. Poet Laureate, and consultant in poetry to the Library of Congress.

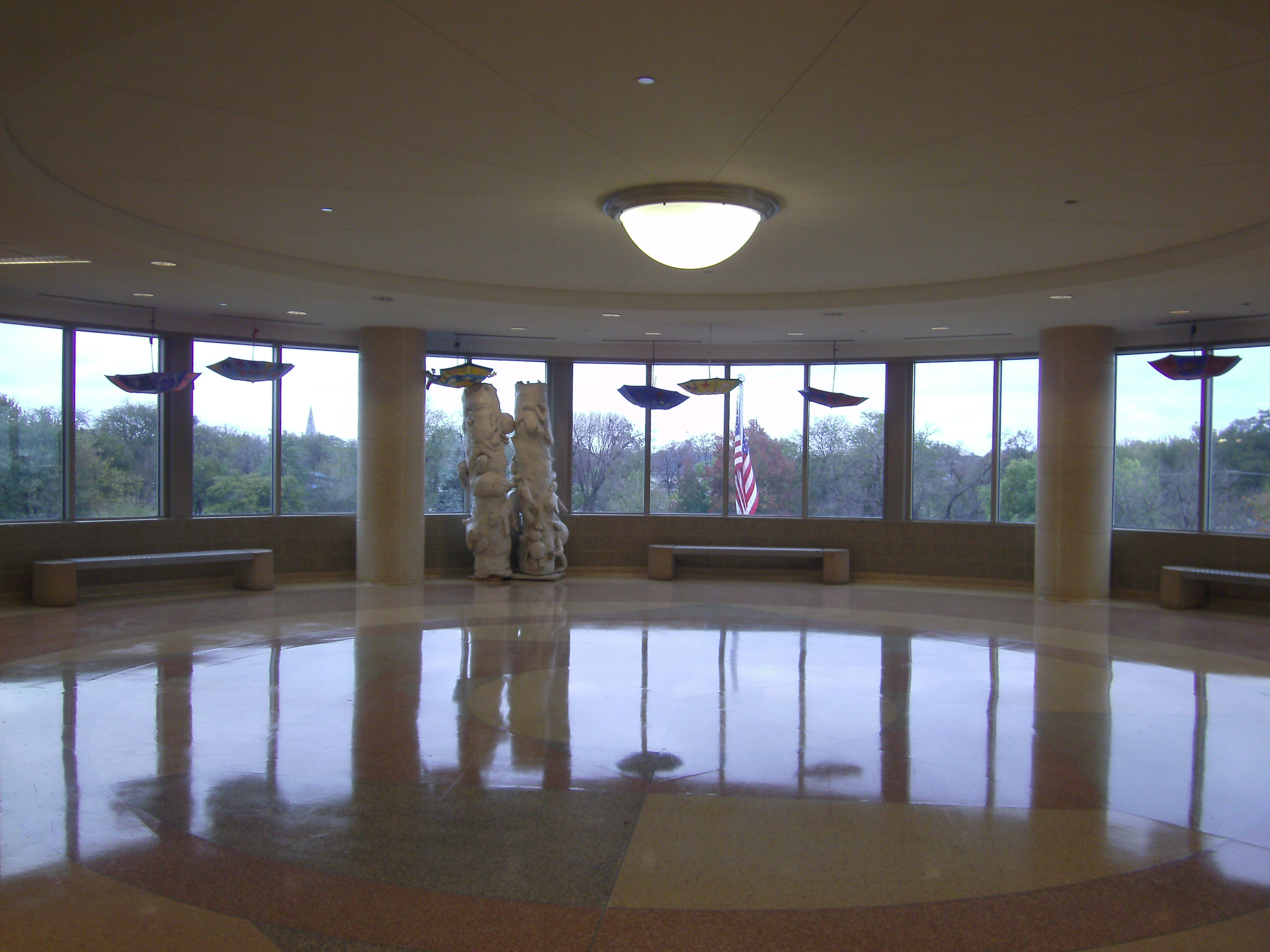
One of the glass rotundas that anchor the main G.B.C.P.A. building

== Campus and facilities ==
Brooks is located at 111th and King Drive in the Roseland area which is a neighborhood on the South Side of Chicago, twelve miles (19 km) from the Chicago Loop by Lake Calumet. Roseland is near the historically significant Pullman Historic District. Significant landmarks nearby include the Hotel Florence, the Arcade Building which was destroyed in the 1920s, the Clock Tower and Factory, the complex surrounding Market Square and Greenstone Church.

== Extra-curricular activities ==
=== Sports ===
- Chess Team
- Boys/girls cross country
- Boys football
- Boys/girls Soccer
- Boys/girls tennis
- Boys/girls volleyball
- Boys/girls basketball
- Boys/girls bowling
- Boys baseball
- Girls softball
- Boys/girls track and field
- Boys softball
- Boys wrestling
- Girls cheerleading
- Boys/girls swimming
- Boys/Girls Fencing
