= Michèle Prévost =

Canadian civil and environmental engineer

Michèle Prévost (born 1955) is a Canadian civil and environmental engineer and an expert on the treatment, distribution, and testing of drinking water. She is a professor in the Department of Civil, Geological and Mining Engineering at Polytechnique Montréal, where she holds an NSERC Industrial Chair in Drinking Water.

== Education and career ==
Prévost is originally from Montreal, one of four children of a surgeon. She was an undergraduate at McGill University, where she completed a degree in environmental science in 1979. She received a master's degree in civil engineering at Polytechnique Montréal, and completed a Ph.D. in environmental engineering there in 1991.

Prevost began her career working as a water engineering consultant, and later as a research and development manager. She became an assistant professor at Polytechnique Montréal in 1992, an associate professor in 1995, and a full professor in 1999. She has held the NSERC Industrial Chair in Drinking Water since 1992.

== Recognition ==
Prévost has received the 2015 Hubert Demard Award of Réseau Environnement, the 2016 A.P. Black Research Award of the American Water Works Association, the 2017 Prix Acfas Michel-Jurdant of the Association francophone pour le savoir, and the King Charles III Coronation Medal of the Government of Canada (2024).

She was elected to the Canadian Academy of Engineering in 2021.
