= Provoost =

Provoost is a surname. Notable people with the surname include:

- Jan Provoost (1465–1529), Flemish painter
- Samuel Provoost (1742–1815), third Presiding Bishop of the Episcopal Church, USA
- Anne Provoost (born 1964), Belgian author
- William Provoost (aka 'Guilliame Provoost') (fl. 1556–1607), Protestant in Antwerp who fled religious persecution and his descendants settled in New Amsterdam (now New York) in the early 1600s
