= Arthur Provost Three-Decker =

Historic triple decker house in Worcester, Massachusetts

- U.S. National Register of Historic Places
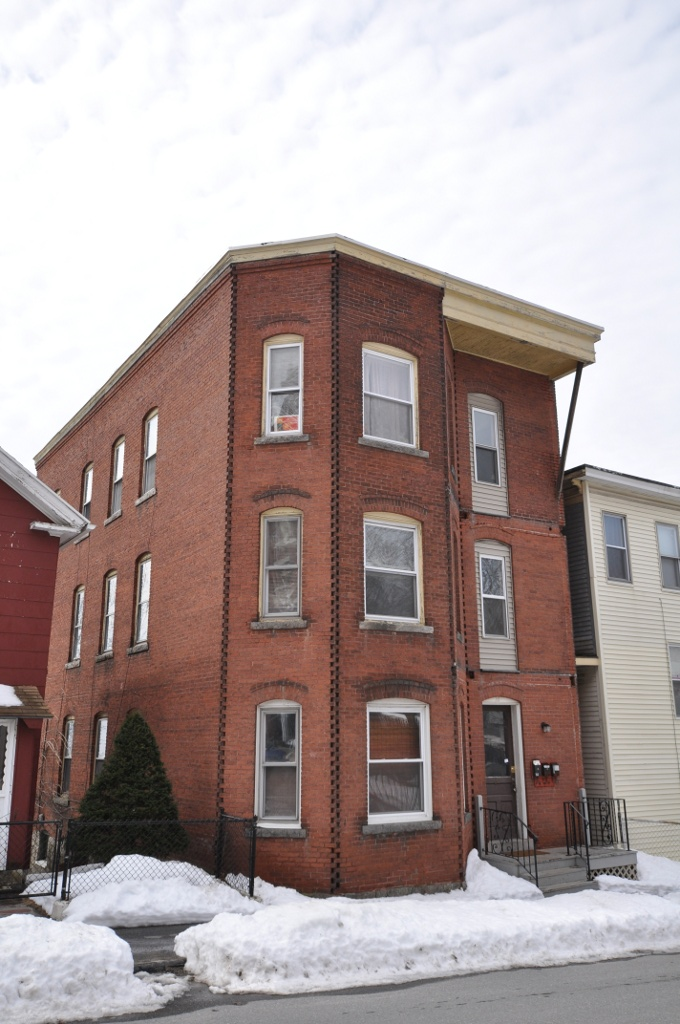

- Location within Massachusetts Location within the United States
- Location: 30 Thorne St., Worcester, Massachusetts
- Coordinates: 42°15′27″N 71°47′4″W
- Area: less than one acre
- Built: c. 1910
- Architectural style: Queen Anne
- MPS: Worcester Three-Deckers TR
- NRHP reference No.: 89002444
- Added to NRHP: February 9, 1990

The Arthur Provost Three-Decker is a historic triple decker house in Worcester, Massachusetts. Built c. 1910, it is a locally rare instance of the form built in brick. It was also originally noted for its fine Queen Anne porches, which have been removed. The building was listed on the National Register of Historic Places in 1990.

== Description and history ==
The Arthur Provost Three-Decker is located southeast of downtown Worcester, on the south side of Thorne Street in the city's Franklin Plantation neighborhood. It is a three-story structure, built out of red brick and covered by a hip roof. Windows and doors are set in segmented-arch openings, and there is a polygonal window bay on the left side of the front facade. The right side originally had a stack of wooden porches with elaborate Queen Anne styling, including turned posts, spindled balusters, and bracketed eaves; the porches have subsequently been entirely removed, and the upper-floor doorways filled by wood framing and windows, while the ground-floor entrance is now fronted by an open porch with iron railing.

The house was built about 1910, during an eastward expansion of residential development into the area. Its first known owner, Arthur Provost, was a bookkeeper, and many of its early tenants were of French Canadian extraction.

== See also ==
- National Register of Historic Places listings in eastern Worcester, Massachusetts
