= Amédée Prouvost =

French poet

Amedee Prouvost
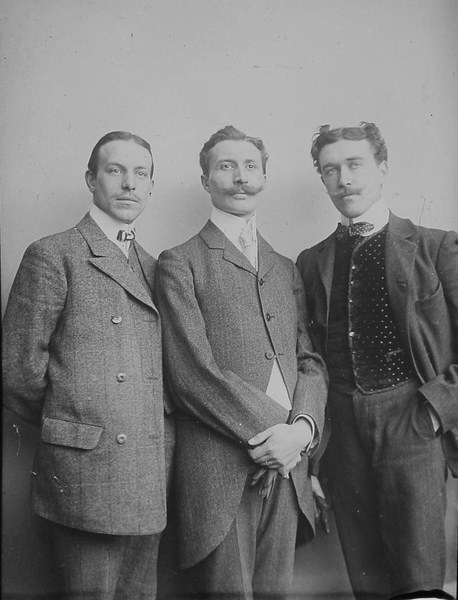
- Born: September 4, 1877; Roubaix
- Died: May 8, 1909 (aged 31); Roubaix
- Education: University of Bonn
- Father: Amédée II Prouvost

Amédée Prouvost (September 4, 1877 – May 8, 1909) was a French industrialist and poet.

== Biography ==
Amédée III Prouvost was born in Roubaix, the son of industrialist Amédée II Prouvost (1853–1927) and the grandson of Amédée I Prouvost (1820–1885), co-founder of Peignage Amédée Prouvost. He married Céline Lorthiois, daughter of businessman Floris Lorthiois and Céline Motte, and sister of Pierre Lorthiois. After being widowed, she remarried Louis Toulemonde.

After studying literature for a year at the University of Bonn in Germany, he traveled the world, visiting Italy, Egypt, Palestine, Syria, Turkey, and Greece. Upon returning to Roubaix, he rejoins the family industry. He dedicates himself to literature, publishing several poetry collections, which earned him the Archon-Despérouses Prize (from the French Academy) in 1906 and recognition from the Society of Sciences, Agriculture, and Arts of Lille.

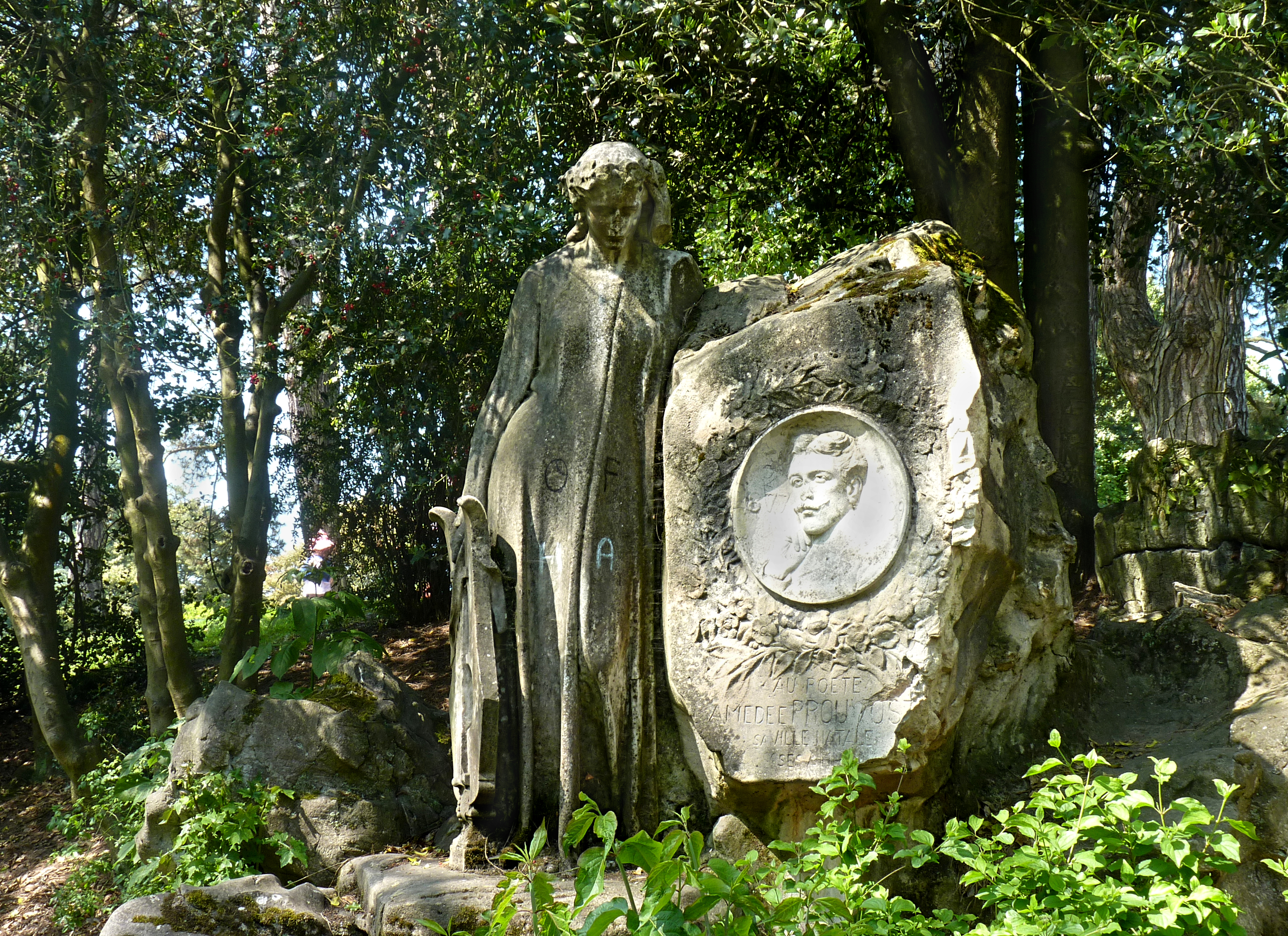
Monument Amédée Prouvost in the park Barbieux in Roubaix, France.

He notably contributes to Le Beffroi, Le Correspondant, La Renaissance latine, La Revue septentrionale, Durendal, La Revue de Lille, and Le Journal de Roubaix.

In early 1909, he contracted pulmonary tuberculosis and died on May 8, 1909 in Roubaix. A monument in honor of Amédée Prouvost has been erected in Barbieux Park in Roubaix.

== Works ==
- The Traveling Soul (1903)
- The Poem of Work and Dream (1905)
- Moonlight Sonatas (Calmann-Lévy, 1906) – Archon-Despérouses Prize
- Christmas Tale, a verse skit illustrated by André des Gachons (1907)
- Selected and Unpublished Pages, with a preface by Jules Lemaître (Grasset, 1911)
- We Will No Longer Go to the Woods, fragments of a comedy in verse

== Sources ==
- Canon Constantin Lecigne, "Amédée Prouvost," Grasset, 1911
- Adolphe van Bever, "Poets of the Land from the 15th Century to the 20th Century," 1920
- Gérard Walch, "Poets of Yesterday and Today," 1916
