= Prévost station =

Railway station in Quebec, Canada

Prévost
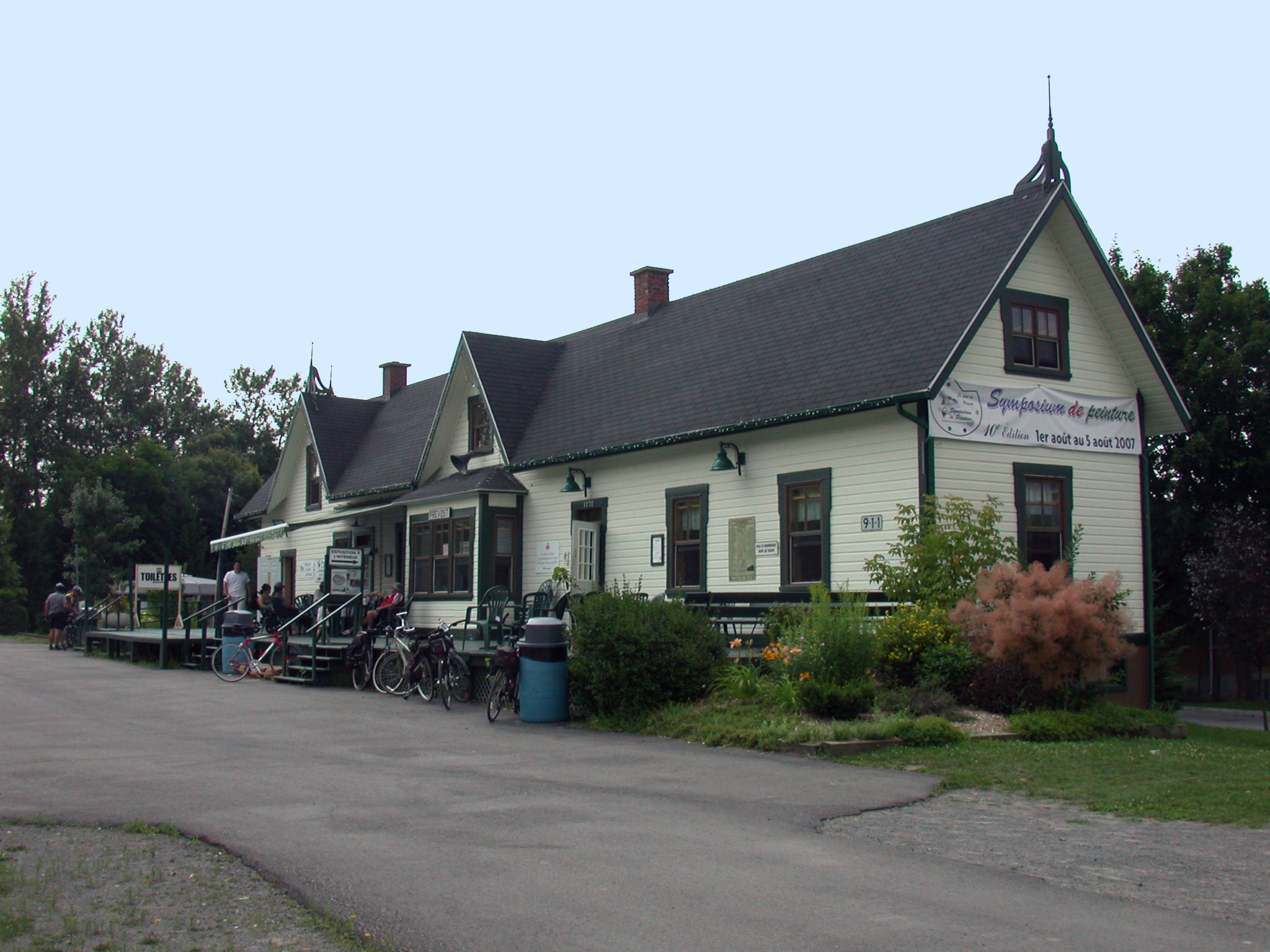
- Prévost station in 2007

General information
- Location: 1272, rue de la Traverse, Prévost, Quebec J0R 1T0
- Coordinates: 45.8727°N 74.0754°W

History
- Former names: Shawbridge

Former services
| Preceding station | Canadian Pacific Railway | Following station |
|---|---|---|
| Piedmont toward Mont-Laurier | Montreal – Mont-Laurier | Lesage toward Montreal Place Viger |
Location

The Prévost station (formerly known as Shawbridge station) is a former Canadian Pacific railway station in Prévost, Quebec, Canada. It now serves as a café and cultural centre for area residents and users of the Parc Linéaire Le P'tit Train du Nord linear park cycling trail, and is no longer connected to the railway network.
