= Brookwood School District 167 =

School district in Illinois, United States

Address
- 201 East Glenwood-Dyer Road Glenwood, Illinois, 60425; United States

District information
- Type: Public
- Grades: PreK–8
- NCES District ID: 1716950

Students and staff
- Students: 1,132

Other information
- Website: www.brookwood167.org

Brookwood School District 167 is an elementary school district based in the southern Cook County, Illinois village of Glenwood; it serves a periphery of the city of Chicago. The district is composed of four schools: two primary schools, one middle school, and one junior high school. Students begin their education at either Hickory Bend Elementary School or Longwood Elementary School; both institutions serve students up to grade four, although Longwood includes a prekindergarten program. Students later attend Brookwood Middle School from fifth through sixth grade before completing their education in the district at Brookwood Junior High School, which serves grades seven and eight. The district's superintendent is Dr. Valorie Moore. Louis Marius Prevost, the father of the current Pope Leo XIV, served as a superintendent.
