= William Provost =

William Provost (Guilliame Provoost) (fl. 1556–after 1607) was a Protestant and a merchant who lived in Antwerp, then a city in the Netherlands. Some of William's descendants settled in New Amsterdam (now known as New York City) in the early 1600s; he had famous descendants and relatives in North American history; and some North Americans can trace their lineage to William. William and his family appear to have survived the murderous rampage of the Spanish Fury in 1576. A version of William's life tells that he was a Huguenot that fled Paris on the day before the St. Bartholomew's Day massacre of 1572.

== Name variants ==
William Provost is his anglicized name and in records, William is variously referred to as Guilliame, Ghiliam, Gulliaem, Giljaem, Gutielmus, or Willem. Provost is also spelt, Prevoost, Provoost, Provoest, or the French form of Prévost.

== The life of William Provost ==
William Provost "... was a merchant, and resided in the business quarter of [Antwerp]. He and his wife belonged to the then secret Protestant movement but to avoid the Inquisition, they, as was the custom with most Protestants in this region and time period, had their children baptized in the Roman Catholic Church of St Walburgis in their neighbourhood." (Confirmation, with minor additions and corrections, is presented in.)

The St Walburgis' Catholic Church (known as Sint Walburgis Kerk in Antwerp) no longer exists.

William Provost and his second wife, Maeijken Stevens, may have fled Antwerp in 1576 at the time of the Spanish Fury. However, this has not been confirmed. Indeed there are records for William Provost’s family in Antwerp up to 1584 (although no supporting evidence is given in that reference). Perhaps they fled and then returned. At some time William Provost and his family seem to have moved to nearby Middelburg in the Province of Zeeland. Unfortunately Middelburg's archives were destroyed during World War II.

William Provost became a citizen of Amsterdam on the 23rd of December 1598 so he and his family must have been there some years before this date. He was still alive in 1607 when his daughter Catherina married. William's will, written in 1606, lists three of his children: Elijsabeth (deceased but whose child was alive), Catherina and Wilhelmus.

== A version of William Provost's life ==
There is a version of historical events that have been attributed to William. Although some aspects of this version are incorrect it is important to document this version as these events have been oft quoted by his descendants.

There are two major historical references that document one version of William's life:

- A manuscript from 1724, written by William’s great great grandson David Provost (1670–1725)
- The book "Biographical and Genealogical Notes of the Provost Family from 1545 to 1895", written by a descendant Andrew J Provost

These references tell the story that William lived in Paris and was warned by a Colonel in the King's army about the impending St. Bartholomew's Day massacre. It is then reported that William fled to Holland with his fiancee, escaping the massacre. William was also described as "... a person of distinction and eminence ..." and "noble blood".

This version of William's life lists his children as Johannes, David, Wilhelmes, Elias, and Benjamin. Johannes was actually Wilhelmus or Guilliam, the father of David who emigrated to New Amsterdam (now known as New York City) in 1624 (see below).

There seems to have been some confusion regarding William Provost's story that was handed down to the following generations. Perhaps the story that William Provost was warned by a Colonel in the army and fled is correct ... only that it occurred in Antwerp prior to the Spanish Fury. Some of the descendants of William Provost may have incorrectly linked this event with the St. Bartholomew's Day massacre in Paris.

== The immediate family of William Provost ==
The family of William Provost [Ghiliam Provoost]:

William married Maria Karreman in 1556, William and Maria had:

1. Maijcken Provoost (ca. 1557–1584); married Hans Mertens

2. Elijsabeth Provoost (ca. 1559–); married Andries Jansz van der Muellen

William married Maeijken Stevens in 1564, William and Maeijken had (all baptised at St Walburgis' Catholic Church, Antwerp):

1. Anna Provoost (1566–)

2. Margareta Provoost (1567–before 1569)

3. Margareta Provoost (1569–)

4. Katherina Provoost (1570–); married Engbert Jobsz in 1607

5. Wilhelmus Provoost (1572–)

6. Sara Provoost (1573–)

7. Esther Provoost (1574–before 1605); married David Damman

8. Adam Provoost (1575–)

The genealogy of some of William's descendants, that lived mainly in the New York area, is documented to at least 1895.

== Famous descendants of William Provost ==
- David Provoost was baptized in Amsterdam 11 August 1611 and died in New Amsterdam in 1656. He was the grandson of William Provoost through his son Wilhelmus (1572–). He travelled to New Amsterdam (now New York) in 1624, two years before the island was purchased from the local Native Americans. After some years, he went back to Amsterdam where he married and returned with his wife to New Amsterdam, before April 1639 He became commissary of provisions (1640), tobacco inspector, lawyer, and notary public in New Amsterdam; and commander at Fort Good Hope.
- David Provoost, Born 9 October 1695, owner of The Louvre Farm page 17.
- David Provost was the Mayor of New York City from 1699 to 1700
- Reverend Samuel Provoost (1742–1815) was the third Presiding Bishop of the Episcopal Church, USA, as well as the first Bishop of the Episcopal Diocese of New York

== Famous relatives of William Provost ==
It has been suggested that two of William's brothers fled to Switzerland. However, that William was a brother of the two has not been confirmed. Descendants of this side of the family are:

- Major General Augustine Prevost (1723–1786) who was a Swiss-born British soldier who served in the Seven Years' War and the American War of Independence; and his son
- Sir George Prevost (1767–1816) who was Lieutenant Governor of Nova Scotia (1808–1811), Governor-in-Chief of British North America (1811-1814), and Commander-in-Chief of British forces in North America. He served in the West Indies during the French Revolutionary Wars and the Napoleonic Wars.

== Open questions ==
- Two references suggest that William's descendants also emigrated to Scotland. However, this has not been confirmed.
