= Catholic High School (New Iberia, Louisiana) =

Location
- 1301 DeLaSalle Drive; New Iberia, (Iberia Parish), Louisiana 70560; United States; 29°59′21″N 91°49′53″W

Information
- Type: Private, Coeducational
- Motto: Acta Non Verba (Actions, Not Words)
- Religious affiliation: Catholic
- Denomination: Roman Catholic
- Patron saint: St.Jean-Baptiste de la Salle
- Established: 1918
- School board: Diocese of Lafayette
- School district: 2A
- Authority: New Iberia Catholic churches: Nativity of Our Lady, Our Lady of Perpetual Help, Sacred Heart of Jesus, Saint Peter's
- Superintendent: Anna Larriviere
- Principal: Kyle Bourque
- Faculty: 60
- Grades: 4–12
- Student to teacher ratio: 15.8 to 1
- Hours in school day: Seven
- Colors: Red and white
- Fight song: CHS fight
- Athletics conference: LHSAA
- Mascot: Panthers
- Team name: Catholic High Panthers
- Accreditation: Southern Association of Colleges and Schools
- Newspaper: Panther Pause
- Yearbook: Panther
- Tuition: $5,058-$5,683, with discounts for siblings, and bursaries available
- Feeder schools: St. Edward's, New Iberia
- Website: www.chspanthers.com

Catholic High School of New Iberia, Louisiana, has predecessors dating to 1918 and was opened in its current form in 1957 by the Brothers of the Christian Schools, and is located on De La Salle Drive, a road named after Saint Jean-Baptiste de la Salle, the man who founded the Brothers in 1680. De la Salle, an innovator in the field of education, was canonised by the Catholic Church on 24 May 1900, and in 1950 Pope Pius XII declared him to be the Patron Saint of teachers. The school was once boys-only.

The school is a private, coeducational institution which embraces the Catholic tradition, though it welcomes students from all faith communities. As of 2020, the enrolment was just under 600 students from 4th-12th grades. The mascot is the panther. The school has membership in the National Catholic Educational Association and the Southern Association of Colleges and Schools. It is co-owned by the city of New Iberia parishes dedicated to Our Lady of Perpetual Help, Saint Peter's, the Sacred Heart and the Nativity of Our Lady.

As required by the Diocese of Lafayette, the school operates a non-discrimination policy in regards to race, gender or religion in the areas of admission, academics, athletics and extracurricular activities. Catholic High's main feeder school is Saint Edward's (Pre-K through 3rd grade) in New Iberia.

== Brief history ==
Until 1957, the school, established in 1918, had been called St. Peter's College, and was situated close to the church of the same name in the middle of New Iberia. The school catered for boys from 4th-12th grade. At the same time as the move to a new campus, the Brothers transferred ownership of the school to the Catholic parishes of the town. New Iberia also had a school for girls, owned and operated by the Sisters of Mount Carmel, who had been present in the community since the middle of the 19th century.

By the late 1980s the number of students at both schools had declined; the Board, together with the owners (the pastors of 4 New Iberia parishes) of Catholic High made the decision to become co-educational, and this took effect with the beginning of the 1987-1988 school year. Due to various circumstances, the Sisters of Mount Carmel decided to close their school at the end of the 1987-1988 school year. After Catholic High became co-educational, the enrolment surged from around 350 to almost 950 in one year; this was due, not only to the (roughly 250) girls from Mount Carmel, but also to an influx of over 300 students from state schools. It was ironic that the Catholic High authorities had to lease the former Mount Carmel High school building until an expansion programme had been completed on the De La Salle campus. Conscious of the high esteem in which the Sisters of Mount Carmel were held by the people of New Iberia, the expanded Catholic High later embraced some traditions of that institution, such as the capping of graduating seniors and incorporating into its crest the crown of the Carmelite Order. Once the campus additions had been completed in 1992, the school's chaplain sought to have the well-known statue of Our Lady of Mount Carmel transferred to De La Salle Drive, but the Sisters declined. Unfortunately, during that same year Hurricane Andrew caused one of the large oak trees on Mount Carmel's campus to collapse, destroying the statue.

In the 1990s, due to a fall in vocations, the Brothers of the Christian Schools found it necessary to end their time at Catholic High after serving the New Iberia community for many years. Brother Richard Kovatch, the last brother-principal, at the time of leaving, had been the only brother in residence for 3 years.

== Innovative School ==
Within the Roman Catholic Diocese of Lafayette, Catholic High School came to be seen as something of an innovator in the areas of retreats and community service during the 1980s and 1990s. By 1981 most of its upper level students had begun taking part in an annual retreat, prepared and organised by the students themselves over several months. The 3-day senior retreat, though voluntary, was invariably attended by the whole class. As time progressed, retreats were added for all levels of the upper school (9-12), something which is now taken for granted in most Catholic high schools.

Catholic High was unique in the Diocese of Lafayette in that it had a full-time chaplain, Fr. David Coupar, for several years. He and the then principal, Br. Dale Guyote, were instrumental in having the bishop (at the time Harry Flynn) change the policy of the Catholic Schools' Office that any girl found to be pregnant had to leave school. The principal and chaplain were concerned that a girl might seek an abortion rather than reveal her pregnancy and risk having to leave a Catholic school. They also proposed to Bishop Flynn that the Gospel of Christ required compassion, understanding and support at such a time in a girl's life. The bishop, fairly new to the Diocese, was apparently unaware of the policy, and readily agreed to a change. Consequently, throughout the diocese, any decision to leave Catholic education now rests solely with the girl, her family and her physician. The school was also the first in the diocese to implement education units (developed by the education office of the U.S. Conference of Catholic Bishops) on H.I.V. and A.I.D.S. during the early days of the disease when little was known about the illness and prejudice widespread.

Another way in which Catholic High was seen to lead the field was that it was one of the first Catholic schools to institute a service programme. The motto of the school is "Acta non Verba" which means "Actions not Words", and this was the driving force behind the decision in the 1980s to reach out to the most needy members of the wider community. Initially, the programme encompassed only those students in high school (freshmen 5 hours, sophomores 10 hours, juniors 15 hours and seniors 25 hours) but it was later extended to include 7th & 8th graders. In the late 1980s, Br. John Fairfax added an important spiritual element to the whole process by establishing the popular Lasallian Youth at the school. Service programmes are now a feature of many Catholic high schools.

Catholic High also established a reputation for excellence in the areas of science and mathematics, with its well-attended annual fairs, organised and directed by long-serving faculty member, Dr. Donald Voorhies.

== Lasallian School ==
The website of the Christian Brothers New Orleans-Santa Fe Province lists Catholic High as a Lasallian school. The LaSallian tradition, which reaches as far back as the 17th century, means that Catholic High is called to strive to help students grow in faith through prayer, active participation in their place of worship, together with involvement in the wider community through service to others, particularly to those people most in need.

In the minds of the Brothers "For Lasallian establishments to be the living expression of the Good News, they must be places for dialogue in truth, freedom, and hope."

Therefore, the mission which Catholic High embraces is to educate the whole person, challenging each student to reach his/her fullest potential as a well-round individual who is intellectually competent, open to growth, religious/spiritual, loving, and committed to doing justice through generous service to the People of God. Education at CHS aims to integrate a student's faith with knowledge, and to encourage everyone to apply both in improving the world in which they live.

== The new millennium ==
Even after the leaving of the Brothers, the dramatic enrolment increase of late the 1980s was maintained, with a student population between 950-975 and the school continued the expansion of its campus under its first lay principal, Mr. Dave Cavalier. New middle school classrooms and a new cafeteria and library were completed as expansion continued under principal Ivy Landry (2002-2006). In 2005, the student population temporarily ballooned to nearly 1,200 students in the aftermath of hurricanes Katrina and Rita before returning to under just under 1,000 students the following year.

In 2006 Tim Uhl became principal. During his tenure, the library was converted into a chapel (containing stained glass windows depicting the school's history) enabling the celebration of the Eucharist to be held for class groups. A handicapped ramp and seating area were added to the football stadium. Athletic physical education classes and Louisiana Virtual School online courses were offered. Carnegie unit courses in Computer Technology Applications and Physical Science were made available to eighth grade students.

However, the advent of Uhl was also accompanied by a change of vision and practice, which brought a degree of controversy. As a result, student enrolment fell substantially and there was a 70-person turnover in personnel over a 3-year period. In late July 2009, the Board of Pastors met with Uhl. After the meeting, the school chancellor, Fr. Charles Langlois, published a letter in the Daily Iberian newspaper which stated that: "The 70 person turnover in personnel was discussed as well as other issues." However, "No motions were made for further action." The nature of the 'other issues' was not revealed. Not long after, Uhl informed the community that he would not be returning after the 2009-2010 academic year. It was announced in March 2010 that Catholic High alumnus, Ray Simon (Class of 1965), then-principal of St Thomas More High School in Lafayette, Louisiana, would take over at Catholic High, assuming his duties at the beginning of the 2010-2011 academic year.

Simon became the school's first lay alumnus principal. His primary goal of establishing a school band became a reality when, in the 2011-2012 academic year, a band director was hired and instruction began for all interested students in grades 4-12. Adding to the school's already strong academic programs were the addition of dual enrollment courses for juniors and seniors in both English and Social Studies. Students now had the opportunity to graduate with 12 hours of college credit. In the middle school, a new computer laboratory was installed and technology instruction was fully integrated across the curriculum. In the elementary grades, the Accelerated Reader program was adopted and every classroom outfitted with an interactive whiteboard and projector. The school's physical plant also saw continued improvements under Simon, including the addition of visitor bleachers at the football stadium and automatic bleachers in the gymnasium. Catholic High School's enrolment rose again after Simon's arrival and stood at 944 as of the 2011-2012 academic year. In 2018, the first female, Dr. Stella Arabie, was appointed as principal.

== Athletics ==
Catholic High of New Iberia athletics competes in the LHSAA.

=== Championships ===
Football Championships

- (3) State Championships: 1962, 2017, 2024

Softball Championships

- (1) State Championships: 2011

Baseball Championships

- (2) State Championships: 2001, 2025

=== Coaches ===
Football
Catholic High won its second football state championship as 2017 Louisiana Division III state champions under Head Coach, Brent Indest.

== Notable alumni of the three schools ==
- Amos, Trey (born 2002), NFL cornerback Class of 2020
- Blanco, Kathleen, Governor of Louisiana (1942- 2019) Class of 1960
- Duhé, John M., Retired 5th Circuit Court of Appeals Judge
- Haik, Richard T., Class of 1968. Judge of the United States District Court for the Western District of Louisiana.
- Rodrigue, George, nationally known artist. Class of 1962
