= Kyle Duncan =

Kyle Duncan may refer to:

- Kyle Duncan (judge) (born 1972), American judge
- Kyle Duncan (soccer) (born 1997), American soccer player
