= Judge Putnam =

Judge Putnam may refer to:

- Richard Johnson Putnam (1913–2002), judge of the United States District Court for the Western District of Louisiana
- William LeBaron Putnam (1835–1918), judge of the United States Court of Appeals for the First Circuit
