= Trey Amos =

American football player (born 2002)

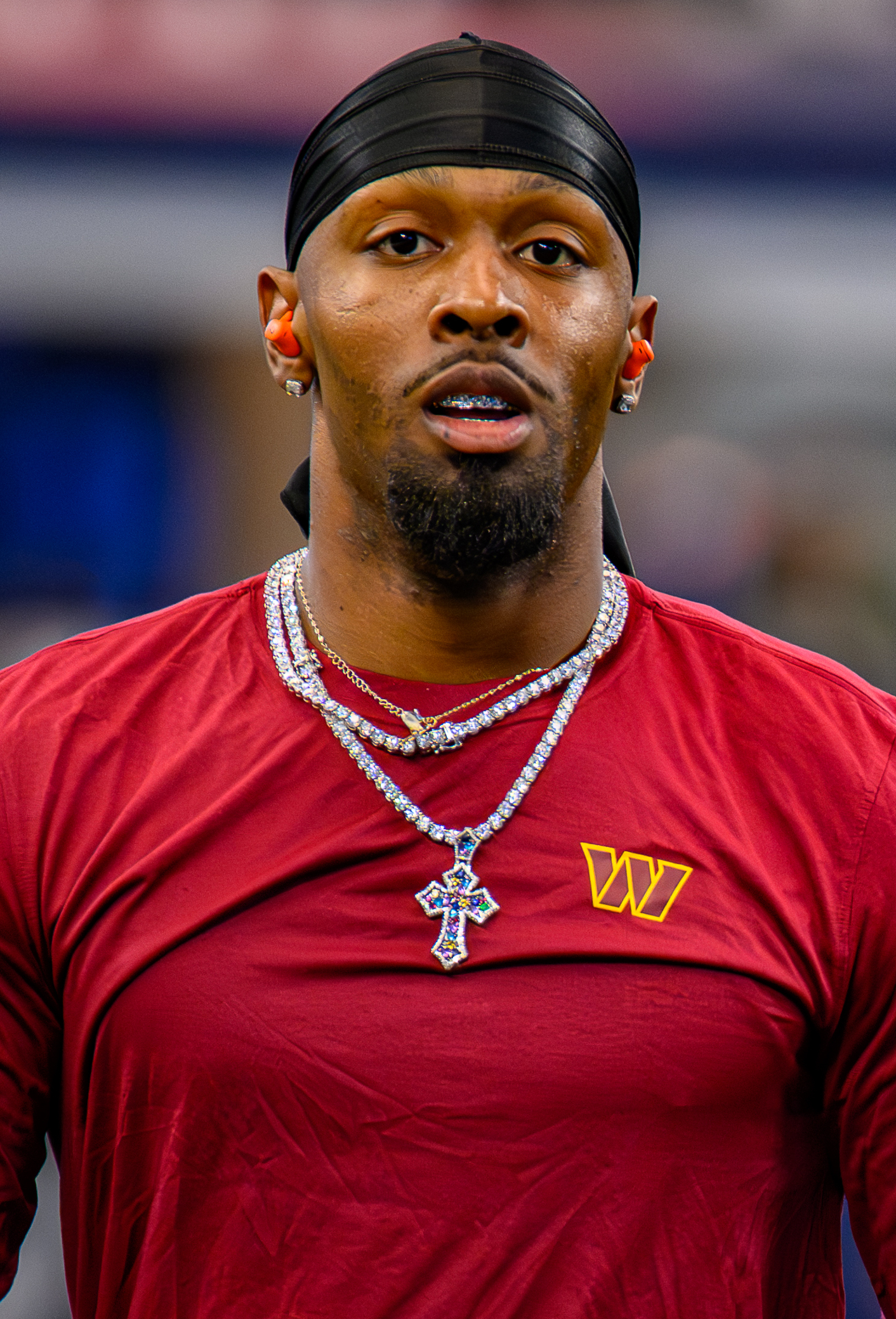
- Amos with the Washington Commanders in 2025

No. 23 – Washington Commanders
- Position: Cornerback
- Roster status: Active

Personal information
- Born: March 3, 2002 (age 24); New Iberia, Louisiana, U.S.
- Listed height: 6 ft 1 in (1.85 m)
- Listed weight: 190 lb (86 kg)

Career information
- High school: Catholic (New Iberia)
- College: Louisiana (2020–2022); Alabama (2023); Ole Miss (2024)
- NFL draft: 2025: 2nd round, 61st overall pick

Career history
- Washington Commanders (2025–present)

Awards and highlights
- First-team All-SEC (2024)

Career NFL statistics as of 2025
- Tackles: 32
- Pass deflections: 6
- Stats at Pro Football Reference

Trenayvian Amos (born March 3, 2002) is an American professional football cornerback for the Washington Commanders of the National Football League (NFL). Amos played college football for the Louisiana Ragin' Cajuns, Alabama Crimson Tide, and Ole Miss Rebels and was selected by the Commanders in the second round of the 2025 NFL draft.

== Early life ==
Amos was born on March 3, 2002, in New Iberia, Louisiana. He attended Catholic High School in New Iberia, where he played quarterback and cornerback and was a state champion in the long jump. Amos committed to play college football for the Ragin' Cajuns at the University of Louisiana at Lafayette.

== College career ==
Amos played in 34 games over three years at Louisiana from 2020 to 2022, recording 59 tackles and one interception. After the 2022 season, he transferred to play for the Crimson Tide at the University of Alabama. In his lone season at Alabama, he played in all 14 games with one start and had 12 tackles. After the season, he transferred again to play for the Rebels at the University of Mississippi (Ole Miss).

== Professional career ==
Pre-draft measurables
| Height | Weight | Arm length | Hand span | Wingspan | 40-yard dash | 10-yard split | 20-yard split | 20-yard shuttle | Vertical jump | Broad jump | Bench press |
|---|---|---|---|---|---|---|---|---|---|---|---|
| 6 ft 0 3/4 in (1.85 m) | 195 lb (88 kg) | 31 1/4 in (0.79 m) | 9 in (0.23 m) | 6 ft 5 3/4 in (1.97 m) | 4.43 s | 1.60 s | 2.57 s | 4.36 s | 32.5 in (0.83 m) | 10 ft 6 in (3.20 m) | 13 reps |
All values from NFL Combine/Pro Day

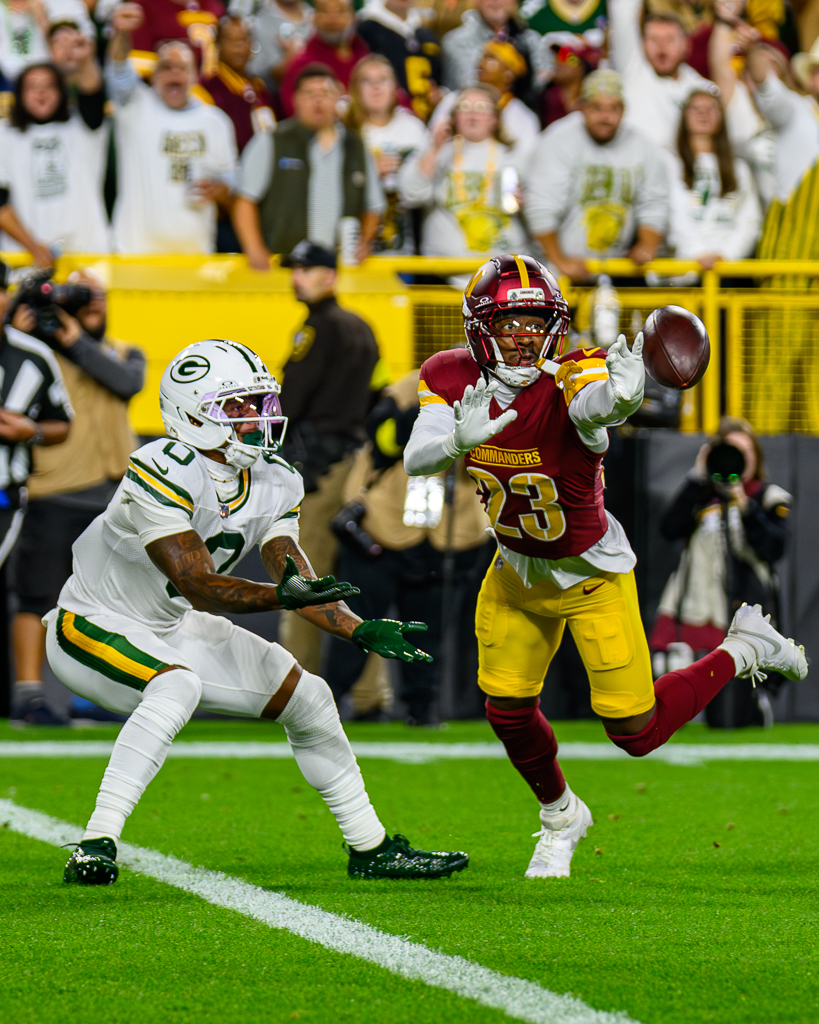
Amos with the Washington Commanders defending a goal line pass against the Green Bay Packers, 2025

Amos was selected by the Washington Commanders in the second round (61st overall) of the 2025 NFL draft. He signed his four-year rookie contract on July 18, 2025. In the Week 10 loss to the Detroit Lions, Amos suffered a fractured fibula while trying to tackle running back, Jahmyr Gibbs. The Commanders placed him on injured reserve on November 11, 2025.

On August 30, 2026, the Commanders placed Amos on injured reserve with a designation to return, meaning he would have to miss at least the first four games of the 2026 season. On October 19, the Commanders activated him for the Week 6 game against the San Francisco 49ers.

== Career statistics ==
=== NFL ===
| Year | Team | Games | | Tackles | | | | | Interceptions | | | | | | Fumbles | | | | |
| Year | Team | GP | GS | Cmb | Solo | Ast | Sck | TFL | Int | Yds | Avg | Lng | TD | PD | FF | Fmb | FR | Yds | TD |
|---|---|---|---|---|---|---|---|---|---|---|---|---|---|---|---|---|---|---|---|
| 2025 | WAS | 10 | 8 | 32 | 19 | 13 | 0.0 | 1 | 0 | 0 | 0.0 | 0 | 0 | 6 | 0 | 0 | 0 | 0 | 0 |
| Career | | 10 | 8 | 32 | 19 | 13 | 0.0 | 1 | 0 | 0 | 0.0 | 0 | 0 | 6 | 0 | 0 | 0 | 0 | 0 |

=== College ===
College statistics
| Year | Team | G | Tackles | | | | | | Interceptions | | | |
| Year | Team | G | Cmb | Solo | Ast | TFL | Sck | FF | Int | Yds | TD | PD |
|---|---|---|---|---|---|---|---|---|---|---|---|---|
| 2020 | Louisiana | 11 | 10 | 10 | – | – | – | – | 1 | 51 | – | – |
| 2021 | Louisiana | 12 | 14 | 10 | 4 | 2 | – | 1 | – | – | – | 5 |
| 2022 | Louisiana | 11 | 35 | 26 | 9 | 1 | – | – | – | – | – | 8 |
| 2023 | Alabama | 14 | 12 | 6 | 6 | 1 | – | – | – | 8 | – | 5 |
| 2024 | Ole Miss | 13 | 50 | 39 | 11 | 4 | – | 1 | 3 | -1 | – | 13 |
| Career | | 61 | 121 | 91 | 30 | 8 | 0 | 2 | 4 | 50 | 0 | 31 |
