= Martin Leach-Cross Feldman =

American judge (1934–2022)

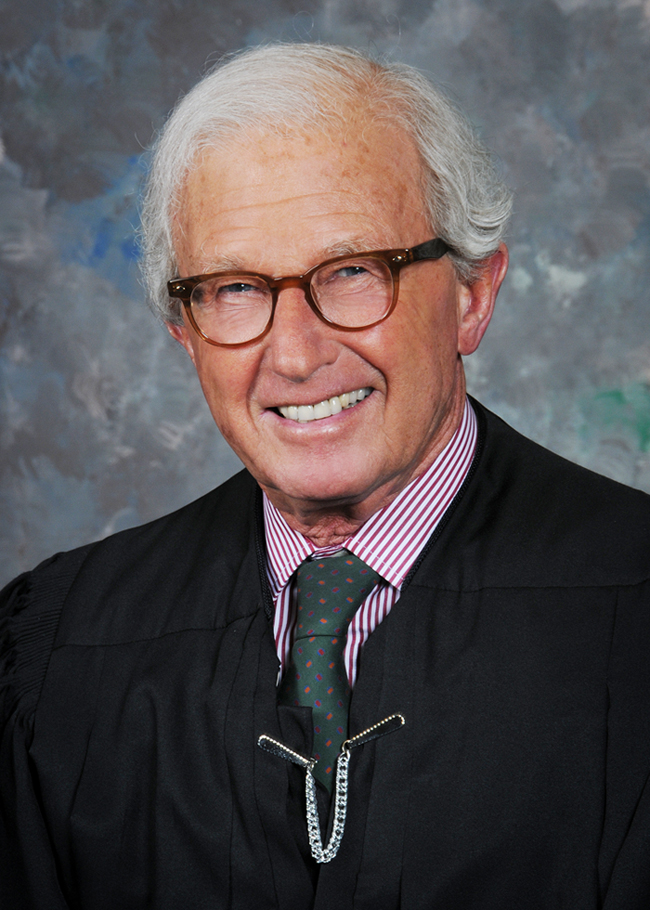

Judge of the United States Foreign Intelligence Surveillance Court
- In office May 19, 2010 – May 18, 2017
- Appointed by: John Roberts
- Preceded by: George P. Kazen
- Succeeded by: Robert B. Kugler

Judge of the United States District Court for the Eastern District of Louisiana
- In office October 5, 1983 – January 26, 2022
- Appointed by: Ronald Reagan
- Preceded by: Jack Murphy Gordon
- Succeeded by: Brandon Scott Long

Personal details
- Born: January 28, 1934 St. Louis, Missouri, U.S.
- Died: January 26, 2022 (aged 87) New Orleans, Louisiana, U.S.
- Party: Republican
- Spouse: Melanie Pulitzer (died 2002)
- Children: 2
- Education: Tulane University (BA, JD)

Martin Leach-Cross Feldman (January 28, 1934 – January 26, 2022) was a United States district judge of the United States District Court for the Eastern District of Louisiana.

== Education and career ==
Feldman, the son of Joseph and Zelma (Bosse) Feldman was born in St. Louis, Missouri in the United States. In 1955, he received a Bachelor of Arts degree from Tulane University in New Orleans, Louisiana and, in 1957, a Juris Doctor from Tulane University Law School. He was a member of the Order of the Coif. He was a United States Army JAG Corps Reserve Captain from 1957 to 1963. Feldman served as a law clerk to Judge John Minor Wisdom of the United States Court of Appeals for the Fifth Circuit from 1957 to 1959. Feldman had a private practice in New Orleans from 1959 to 1983.

=== Political activism ===
Feldman was among seventy-one Jewish delegates (prior to his conversion to Roman Catholicism) and alternates to the convention.

In 1974, Feldman lost a race, 67–32, in the Republican State Central Committee to John H. Cade Jr., for selection as Louisiana Republican National Committeeman.

=== Judicial ideology ===
Feldman considered himself a "traditional" or "old-fashioned" conservative. However, in December 2017, he denounced Roy Moore as a "right-wing nut". He was known to err on the side of limited government. When speaking of the Constitution, Feldman once remarked "It says what it says".

=== Federal judicial service ===
Feldman was nominated by President Ronald Reagan on September 9, 1983, to a seat on the United States District Court for the Eastern District of Louisiana vacated by Judge Jack Murphy Gordon. He was confirmed by the United States Senate on October 4, 1983, and received his commission the following day. In addition to his service on the District Court in New Orleans, Feldman served a term on the FISA Court from 2010 to 2017.

=== Robicheaux v. Caldwell ===
On September 3, 2014, Feldman issued a ruling upholding Louisiana's ban of same-sex marriage. After the United States Supreme Court ruled Section 3 of the Defense of Marriage Act, the federal statute that banned the United States federal government from recognizing same-sex marriage, as unconstitutional in United States v. Windsor, he was the only district federal judge to uphold a state prohibition against same-sex marriage. Feldman said that the state has a legitimate interest in upholding the state's 2004 amendment to the state constitution defining marriage as between one man and one woman that was approved by 78% of voters. Feldman stated, "marriage is a legitimate concern of state law and policy, and that it may be rightly regulated because of what for centuries has been its role."

Feldman also equated the recognition of marriage without regard to sex to incest, writing that he was concerned that recognizing marriage without regard to the sex of the members of the couple would lead to a slippery slope that would eventually require courts to recognize polygamy and incest.

For example, must the states permit or recognize a marriage between an aunt and niece? Aunt and nephew? Brother/brother? Father and child? May minors marry? Must marriage be limited to only two people? What about a transgender spouse? Is such a union same-gender or male-female? All such unions would undeniably be equally committed to love and caring for one another, just like the plaintiffs.

— Judge Feldman, Robicheaux v. Caldwell ruling

Lawyers for the plaintiffs immediately announced plans to appeal the ruling.

In January 2015, the case was heard in the U.S. Court of Appeals for the Fifth Circuit, alongside cases from Texas and Mississippi. The decision remained unresolved at the time of the June 26 Obergefell decision. Following the Supreme Court decision, the appeals court remanded the case back down to Feldman and the district court for a reversal of order ruling in favor of the Louisiana plaintiffs.

=== Deep water drilling ===
On June 22, 2010, Feldman issued a preliminary injunction blocking a six-month moratorium on deep-water offshore drilling in Hornbeck Offshore Services LLC v. Salazar. White House press secretary Robert Gibbs indicated that the Obama administration intended to immediately appeal the decision to the Fifth Circuit Court of Appeals.

Feldman's 2008 financial disclosure report indicates that in that year, he owned stock in Transocean (worth under $15,000), the company that owned the Deepwater Horizon rig, as well as in other oil companies which would be affected by the moratorium. A federal judge is required to consider recusal when he owns shares in one of the parties in the case before him, however none of the companies listed in Feldman's 2008 disclosure were directly involved in the action against Salazar.

Feldman's 2009 financial disclosure report indicates that he had financial investments in multiple BlackRock funds, each valued under $15000, much like the prior year. Although Blackrock was said to be the largest holder of BP stock, it's not clear that any of these funds held stock in BP. Feldman held stock in Exxon-Mobil during the hearing on the drilling moratorium and from June 8 to 21, he issued several orders related to the moratorium case. On June 22, at the "opening of the stock market", he reportedly sold his Exxon-Mobil stock. Hours later, he issued his ruling lifting the moratorium.

As of the June 9, 2010 amended complaint, Transocean, Black Rock, BP, and Exxon-Mobil were not plaintiffs in the action.

=== Louisiana bar closures ===
On August 17, 2020, Feldman ruled that Louisiana's bar closures due to the COVID-19 pandemic are constitutional.

== Personal life and death ==
Feldman died on January 26, 2022, two days before his 88th birthday. He was predeceased by his wife, Melanie (née Pulitzer), who died in 2002. Several years after her death, Feldman converted to Roman Catholicism.

Feldman was in a relationship with businesswoman Sally Kansas from 2015 until his death.

== See also ==
- List of Jewish American jurists
- List of United States federal judges by longevity of service

Legal offices
Preceded by Jack Murphy Gordon	Judge of the United States District Court for the Eastern District of Louisiana; 1983–2022	Succeeded by Brandon Scott Long
Preceded by George P. Kazen	Judge of the United States Foreign Intelligence Surveillance Court; 2010–2017	Succeeded by Robert B. Kugler
