= Jerry Edwards Jr. =

American judge (born 1979)

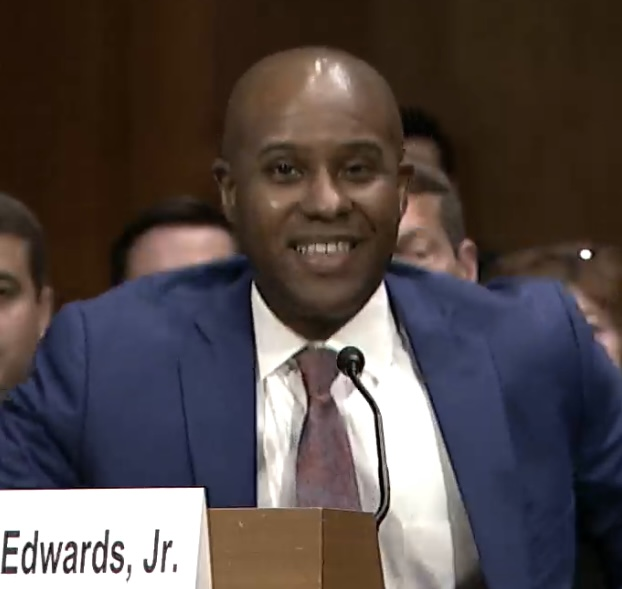

Judge of the United States District Court for the Western District of Louisiana
- Incumbent
- Assumed office December 22, 2023
- Appointed by: Joe Biden
- Preceded by: Michael J. Juneau

Personal details
- Born: 1979 (age 46–47) Shreveport, Louisiana, U.S.
- Education: Georgia State University (BA); Vermont Law and Graduate School (JD)

Jerry Edwards Jr. (born 1979) is an American lawyer from Louisiana who has served as a United States district judge of the United States District Court for the Western District of Louisiana since 2023. He previously served as the first assistant U.S. attorney in the U.S. Attorney's Office for the Western District of Louisiana from 2022 to 2023.

== Education ==
Edwards received a Bachelor of Arts from Georgia State University in 2002 and a Juris Doctor from Vermont Law and Graduate School in 2005.

== Career ==
From 2005 to 2006, Edwards served as a law clerk for Judges Jeanette G. Garrett and Scott Crichton of the Caddo Parish District Court. From 2006 to 2014, he was an associate at Blanchard, Walker, O’Quin & Roberts, A.P.L.C. in Shreveport and from 2014 to 2019, he was a shareholder and director at the same firm, where he focused on civil law, including torts and contracts. From 2019 to 2023, he served as an assistant United States attorney at the U.S. Attorney's Office for the Western District of Louisiana. While at the U.S. Attorney's Office, he served as Chief of the Civil Division from 2020 to 2022 and from 2022 to 2023, he served as the first assistant U.S. attorney. In that capacity, he focused on white collar crime, public corruption, and money laundering.

=== Federal judicial service ===
On June 7, 2023, President Joe Biden announced his intent to nominate Edwards to serve as a United States district judge of the United States District Court for the Western District of Louisiana. Soon after the nomination was announced, Senator Bill Cassidy announced his support. Nine members of the Congressional Black Caucus wrote a letter to President Joe Biden asking him to withdraw the nominations of Edwards and Brandon Scott Long because the sole Democratic lawmaker from Louisiana, Representative Troy Carter, had not been properly consulted on multiple judicial nominations. On June 8, 2023, his nomination was sent to the Senate. President Biden nominated Edwards to the seat vacated by Judge Michael J. Juneau, who assumed senior status on February 1, 2022. On July 12, 2023, a hearing on his nomination was held before the Senate Judiciary Committee. During his confirmation hearing, Senator Marsha Blackburn questioned him whether he would be overwhelmed by the criminal cases federal judges handle given that his background is in civil law. On July 12, 2023, U.S. Representative Steven Horsford sent a letter to Senate Judiciary chairman Dick Durbin saying the Congressional Black Caucus would oppose the Senate Judiciary Committee's consideration of Edwards Jr. and fellow nominee Brandon Scott Long, pending changes to the committee's "blue slip" policy. On September 14, 2023, his nomination was reported out of the committee by a 16–5 vote. On December 14, 2023, the United States Senate invoked cloture on his nomination by a 66–31 vote, with Senator Bob Menendez voting against the motion to invoke cloture. Later that day, his nomination was confirmed by a 66–24 vote. He received his judicial commission on December 22, 2023. He began his service on the bench on December 23, 2023. Edwards became the first person of color to serve on the Western District of Louisiana.

== See also ==
- List of African American federal judges
- List of African American jurists

Legal offices
Preceded by Michael J. Juneau	Judge of the United States District Court for the Western District of Louisiana; 2023–present	Incumbent
