= W. Eugene Davis =

American judge (born 1936)

Eugene Davis

Senior Judge of the United States Court of Appeals for the Fifth Circuit
- Incumbent
- Assumed office December 31, 2016

Judge of the United States Court of Appeals for the Fifth Circuit
- In office November 16, 1983 – December 31, 2016
- Appointed by: Ronald Reagan
- Preceded by: Robert A. Ainsworth Jr.
- Succeeded by: Kyle Duncan

Judge of the United States District Court for the Western District of Louisiana
- In office September 21, 1976 – December 9, 1983
- Appointed by: Gerald Ford
- Preceded by: Richard Johnson Putnam
- Succeeded by: John M. Duhé Jr.

Personal details
- Born: William Eugene Davis; August 18, 1936 (age 89); Winfield, Alabama, U.S.
- Political party: Republican
- Education: Samford University (BA); Tulane University (JD)

William Eugene Davis (born August 18, 1936), known as W. Eugene Davis, is a senior United States circuit judge of the United States Court of Appeals for the Fifth Circuit. His chambers are in New Orleans, Louisiana.

== Education ==
Born in Winfield in Marion County in northwestern Alabama, Davis attended Samford University in Homewood, a suburb of Birmingham, Alabama. After three years at Samford, he received a scholarship to Tulane University Law School in New Orleans. There he received his Juris Doctor in 1960 without having received an undergraduate degree (Samford awarded him a Bachelor of Arts degree in 2006). While at Tulane, Davis was a member of the Board of Editors of the Tulane Law Review and graduated Order of the Coif.

== Career ==
Davis was in private practice in New Orleans from 1960 to 1964, and then joined a law firm in New Iberia, where his partners were Congressman Pat Caffery and U.S. Circuit Judge John Malcolm Duhé, Jr.

== Federal judicial service ==
On August 5, 1976, Davis was nominated by President Gerald Ford, to a seat on the United States District Court for the Western District of Louisiana vacated by Judge Richard Johnson Putnam. Davis was confirmed by the United States Senate on September 17, 1976, and received his commission on September 21, 1976. His service terminated on December 9, 1983, due to elevation to the Fifth Circuit.

President Ronald Reagan nominated Davis to the United States Court of Appeals for the Fifth Circuit on November 1, 1983, to a seat vacated by Judge Robert A. Ainsworth Jr., who died on December 22, 1981. Reagan at first considered Ben Toledano, a New Orleans lawyer and former Republican political candidate for the slot but withdrew the nomination after opposition surfaced from the NAACP. Davis was again confirmed by the United States Senate on November 15, 1983, and received his commission the following day. He assumed senior status on December 31, 2016.

Judge Davis was appointed by Chief Justice William Rehnquist as a member of the Advisory Committee on the Federal Rules of Criminal Procedure on October 1, 1995. Davis became Chairman of this Committee on October 1, 1997 and served as Chairman until October 2001 when his term of service ended.

In 2014, Judge Davis received the prestigious American Inns of Court Professionalism Award for the Fifth Circuit at the American Inns of Court Celebration of Excellence held at the Supreme Court of the United States. Judge Davis was inducted into the Tulane Law School Hall of Fame in March 2015. In 2017, the Louisiana Bar Foundation awarded Davis its Distinguished Jurist Award.

== Notable cases ==
Davis was one of three judges on a panel that heard the appeal to Hornbeck Offshore Services LLC v. Salazar, a case challenging the U.S. Department of the Interior six-month moratorium on exploratory drilling in deep water that was adopted in the wake of the Deepwater Horizon explosion and the subsequent oil spill. The Fifth Circuit panel denied the government's emergency request to stay the lower court's decision pending appeal.

In April 2020, Davis wrote for the unanimous panel when it found a board member of the Houston Community College System could sue for violation of the First Amendment to the United States Constitution after being censured by the other board members. After the circuit deadlocked 8-8 on whether the rehear the case, Davis' judgment was reversed by the unanimous Supreme Court of the United States in Houston Community College System v. Wilson (2022).

In 2022, Davis dissented from the Fifth Circuit's decision in Securities and Exchange Commission v. Jarkesy in which the majority found the SEC's administrative enforcement against Jarkesy to be unconstitutional.

== See also ==
- List of United States federal judges by longevity of service

Legal offices
| Preceded by Richard Johnson Putnam | Judge of the United States District Court for the Western District of Louisiana; 1976–1983 | Succeeded by John M. Duhé Jr. |
| Preceded by Robert A. Ainsworth Jr. | Judge of the United States Court of Appeals for the Fifth Circuit; 1983–2016 | Succeeded by Kyle Duncan |
