= Richard T. Haik =

American judge (born 1950)

Richard Theodore Haik
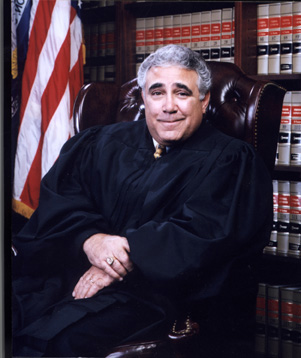

Senior Judge of the United States District Court for the Western District of Louisiana
- In office March 6, 2015 – January 15, 2016

Chief Judge of the United States District Court for the Western District of Louisiana
- In office 2002–2009
- Preceded by: F. A. Little Jr.
- Succeeded by: Robert G. James

Judge of the United States District Court for the Western District of Louisiana
- In office May 30, 1991 – March 6, 2015
- Appointed by: George H. W. Bush
- Preceded by: John M. Duhé Jr.
- Succeeded by: Michael J. Juneau

Judge of the Louisiana 16th Judicial District
- In office 1984–1991
- Preceded by: John Malcolm Duhé Jr.

Personal details
- Born: Richard Theodore Haik; March 1, 1950 (age 76) Lafayette, Louisiana
- Relations: Suzanne Haik Terrell, sister Ted Haik, brother
- Education: University of Louisiana at Lafayette (BS); Loyola University New Orleans College of Law (JD)

Richard Theodore Haik Sr. (born March 1, 1950) is a former United States district judge of the United States District Court for the Western District of Louisiana.

== Background ==
One of four children of Theodore Michael Haik, Sr., and the former Margaret Hannie, both deceased, Richard Haik was born in Lafayette but reared in New Iberia, Louisiana. He graduated in 1968 from Catholic High School in New Iberia, where he was a three-year letterman in football and an all-state defensive end/fullback. In 1971, he received a Bachelor of Science from the University of Louisiana at Lafayette, then named the University of Southwestern Louisiana, where he was a four-year letterman in football for the Ragin' Cajuns. He received his Juris Doctor in 1975 from Loyola University New Orleans College of Law. He was in the private practice of law in New Iberia from 1975 to 1984. From 1971 to 1978, he was a member of the Louisiana Army National Guard; from 1980 to 1984, he was a reserve captain in the United States Army.

=== Personal ===
Haik and his wife, Kathleen, have three children. Elizabeth, Richard, and Mary Carolyn. Kathleen and Haik have nine grandchildren. Elizabeth's children are Avery, Caroline, Coleman, and Mills Johnson. Richard's children are Maisie and Richard Haik. Mary Carolyn's children are Colin, Cannon, and Vail Duffy.

== Judicial career ==
In 1984, Haik was elected as a state district judge for the 16th Judicial District in New Iberia to the seat vacated by John Malcolm Duhé Jr., who became a federal district judge for the Western District of Louisiana under appointment from then U.S. President Ronald W. Reagan. Haik served on the state court until 1991.

On April 11, 1991, Judge Haik was nominated to the United States District Court for the Western District of Louisiana by President George H. W. Bush to the seat vacated by John Malcolm Duhé Jr. This was the second time that Haik assumed a bench vacated by Judge Duhé. Instead Duhé was elevated to the United States Court of Appeals for the Fifth Circuit in New Orleans. Judge Haik was confirmed by the United States Senate on May 24, 1991, received his commission six days later, and was sworn in as a federal judge on June 14, 1991. He served as Chief Judge of the district court from 2002 until June 1, 2009. He assumed senior status on March 6, 2015. He retired from active service on January 15, 2016.

Legal offices
Preceded by John M. Duhé Jr.	Judge of the United States District Court for the Western District of Louisiana; 1991–2015	Succeeded by Michael J. Juneau
Preceded by F. A. Little Jr.	Chief Judge of the United States District Court for the Western District of Louisiana; 2002–2009	Succeeded by Robert G. James
