= Albert Tate Jr. =

American judge (1920–1986)

Judge of the United States Court of Appeals for the Fifth Circuit
- In office October 5, 1979 – March 27, 1986
- Appointed by: Jimmy Carter
- Preceded by: Seat established by 92 Stat. 1629
- Succeeded by: John M. Duhé Jr.

Personal details
- Born: Albert A. Tate Jr. September 23, 1920 Opelousas, Louisiana
- Died: March 27, 1986 (aged 65) New Orleans, Louisiana
- Party: Democratic
- Education: George Washington University (BA); Yale Law School (LLB)

Albert A. Tate Jr. (September 23, 1920 – March 27, 1986), was a long-serving Louisiana judge. A Democrat, Tate served as a justice of the Louisiana Supreme Court in New Orleans, and as a judge of the United States Fifth Circuit Court of Appeals, also based in New Orleans.

== Biography ==
Tate received a B.A. from George Washington University in 1941, and was a U.S. Army special agent during World War II, from 1942 to 1945, thereafter receiving an LL.B. from Yale Law School in 1947. He was in private practice in Ville Platte, Louisiana, from 1948 to 1954.

He was a judge of the Louisiana Court of Appeal for the First Judicial Circuit from 1954 to 1960, and presiding judge of the Louisiana Court of Appeal for the Third Judicial Circuit from 1960 to 1970, and was also a professor of law at Louisiana State University from 1967 to 1968. Upon his election to the Third Circuit Court of Appeal, Tate "was the youngest state court of appeal judge ever elected in Louisiana"; he eventually became the senior presiding judge of all the courts of appeal in the state. He served as an associate justice of the Louisiana Supreme Court from 1970 to 1979.

== Federal judicial service ==
Tate was nominated by President Jimmy Carter on July 31, 1979, to the United States Court of Appeals for the Fifth Circuit, to a new seat created by 92 Stat. 1629. He was confirmed by the United States Senate on October 4, 1979, and received his commission on October 5, 1979. His service was terminated on March 27, 1986, due to his death in New Orleans, Louisiana. He was succeeded by Judge John M. Duhé Jr.

== Sources ==
- "Albert Tate", A Dictionary of Louisiana Biography, Vol. 2 (1988), pp. 780–781
- AP (23 July 1987). "Ex-Louisiana Leader To Be Named a Judge". The New York Times.

Legal offices
Preceded by Seat established by 92 Stat. 1629	Judge of the United States Court of Appeals for the Fifth Circuit; 1979–1986	Succeeded by John M. Duhé Jr.
Preceded by John B. Fournet	Justice of the Louisiana Supreme Court; 1970–1979	Succeeded by Jack C. Watson
