= Jack Murphy Gordon =

American judge (1931–1982)

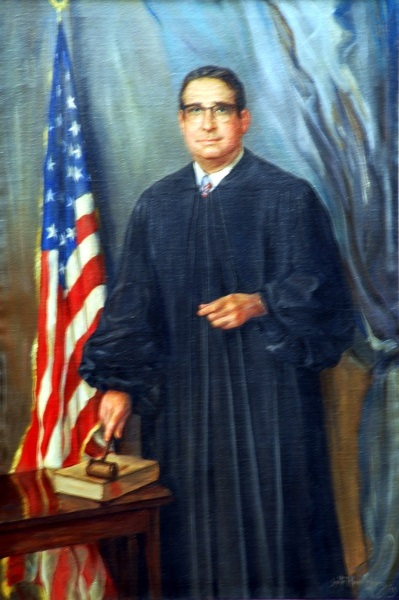

Judge of the United States District Court for the Eastern District of Louisiana
- In office June 22, 1971 – March 4, 1982
- Appointed by: Richard Nixon
- Preceded by: Seat established by 84 Stat. 294
- Succeeded by: Martin Leach-Cross Feldman

Personal details
- Born: Jack Murphy Gordon; February 13, 1931 Lake Charles, Louisiana
- Died: March 4, 1982 (aged 51) Metairie, Louisiana
- Education: Louisiana State University (B.S.); Paul M. Hebert Law Center (J.D.)

Jack Murphy Gordon (February 13, 1931 – March 4, 1982) was a United States district judge of the United States District Court for the Eastern District of Louisiana.

== Education and career ==
Born in Lake Charles, Louisiana, Gordon received a Bachelor of Science degree from Louisiana State University in 1951 and a Juris Doctor from the Paul M. Hebert Law Center at Louisiana State University in 1954. He was in private practice in New Orleans, Louisiana from 1954 to 1971, also serving as a judge advocate in the United States Air Force Judge Advocate General's Corps from 1954 to 1956.

== Federal judicial service ==
On April 14, 1971, Gordon was nominated by President Richard Nixon to a new seat on the United States District Court for the Eastern District of Louisiana created by 84 Stat. 294. He was confirmed by the United States Senate on June 18, 1971, and received his commission on June 22, 1971, serving thereafter until his death of a heart attack on March 4, 1982, in Metairie, Louisiana.

== Sources ==
Legal offices
Preceded by Seat established by 84 Stat. 294	Judge of the United States District Court for the Eastern District of Louisiana; 1971–1982	Succeeded by Martin Leach-Cross Feldman
