= Michael J. Juneau =

American judge (1962–2023)

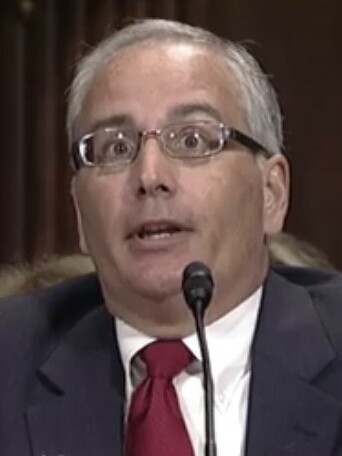
- Juneau in 2017

Senior Judge of the United States District Court for the Western District of Louisiana
- In office February 1, 2022 – May 12, 2023

Judge of the United States District Court for the Western District of Louisiana
- In office October 17, 2018 – February 1, 2022
- Appointed by: Donald Trump
- Preceded by: Richard T. Haik
- Succeeded by: Jerry Edwards Jr.

Personal details
- Born: Michael Joseph Juneau; June 29, 1962; Monroe, Louisiana, U.S.
- Died: May 12, 2023 (aged 60); Lafayette, Louisiana, U.S.
- Education: Louisiana State University (BS); Harvard University (JD)

Michael Joseph Juneau (June 29, 1962 – May 12, 2023) was an American lawyer who served as a United States district judge of the United States District Court for the Western District of Louisiana from 2018 to 2023.

== Biography ==
Juneau was born on June 29, 1962, in Monroe, Louisiana. He received a Bachelor of Science, magna cum laude, from Louisiana State University and a Juris Doctor, cum laude, from Harvard Law School where he was selected as the best oralist in the Ames Moot Court Competition.

As a lawyer at his Lafayette-based litigation firm Juneau David, he handled a broad range of civil litigation in state and federal courts across Louisiana. He also had extensive experience administering mass tort settlements as a court-appointed neutral in significant mass tort and nationwide class action matters. In this capacity, he managed some of the largest multi-district litigation in the United States, including In re: Vioxx Products Liability Litigation and In re: Oil Spill by the Rig "Deepwater Horizon" in the Gulf of Mexico on April 20, 2010.

=== Federal judicial service ===
On August 3, 2017, President Donald Trump nominated Juneau to serve as a United States district judge of the United States District Court for the Western District of Louisiana to the seat vacated by Judge Richard T. Haik, who assumed senior status on March 6, 2015. Juneau's nomination carried the support of U.S. Senators Bill Cassidy and John Kennedy. On October 4, 2017, a hearing on his nomination was held before the Senate Judiciary Committee. On October 26, 2017, his nomination was reported out of committee by an 11–9 vote.

On January 3, 2018, his nomination was returned to the president under Rule XXXI, Paragraph 6, of the United States Senate. On January 5, 2018, Trump announced his intent to re-nominate Juneau to a federal judgeship. On January 8, 2018, his re-nomination was sent to the Senate. On January 18, 2018, his nomination was reported out of committee by an 11–10 vote. On October 11, 2018, the Senate confirmed his nomination by a 54–41 vote. He received his judicial commission on October 17, 2018.

He assumed senior status on February 1, 2022, due to a certified disability. Juneau died at his home in Lafayette on May 12, 2023, at age 60.

Legal offices
Preceded by Richard T. Haik	Judge of the United States District Court for the Western District of Louisiana; 2018–2022	Succeeded by Jerry Edwards Jr.
