= Brandon Scott Long =

American judge (born 1976)

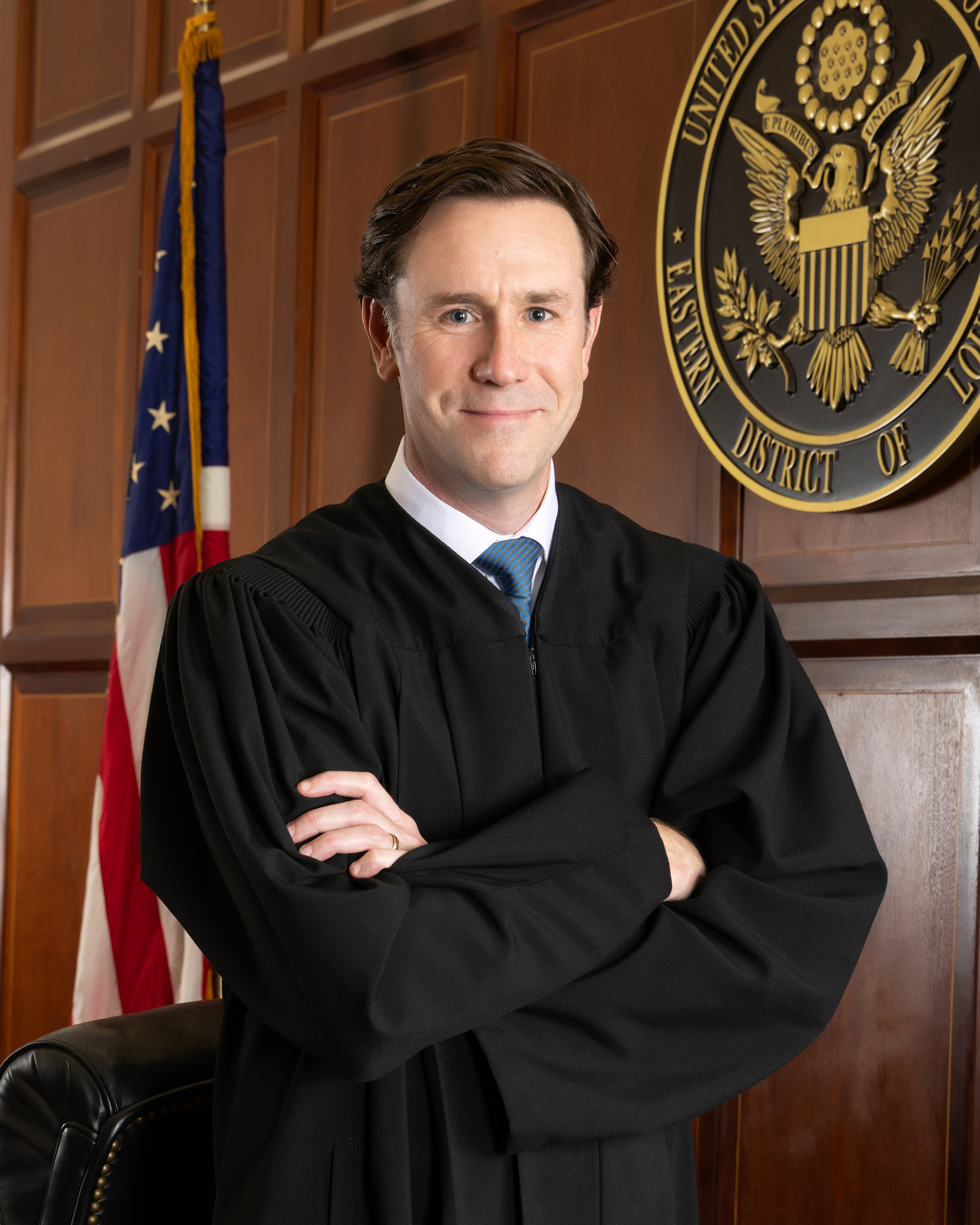

Judge of the United States District Court for the Eastern District of Louisiana
- Incumbent
- Assumed office December 19, 2023
- Appointed by: Joe Biden
- Preceded by: Martin Leach-Cross Feldman

Personal details
- Born: Brandon Scott Long; 1976 (age 49–50) Metairie, Louisiana, U.S.
- Education: University of Texas at Austin (BA, BBA); Duke University (JD)

Brandon Scott Long (born 1976) is an American lawyer who is serving as a United States district judge of the United States District Court for the Eastern District of Louisiana.

== Education ==
Long received a Bachelor of Arts and Bachelor of Business Administration from University of Texas at Austin in 1999 and a Juris Doctor from Duke University School of Law in 2005.

== Career ==
From 2005 to 2010, Long was an associate at King & Spalding at their Washington, D.C. office. From 2010 to 2014, he served as an assistant U.S. attorney in the U.S. Attorney's Office for the District of Columbia. From 2014 to 2023, Long served as an assistant U.S. attorney in the U.S. Attorney's Office for the Eastern District of Louisiana in New Orleans. From February 2020 to July 2021, Long was detailed to serve as the deputy chief of staff to FBI Director Christopher A. Wray in Washington, D.C.

=== Notable cases ===
- In 2016, Long prosecuted retired New Orleans Saints player Darren Sharper who was accused of drugging and raping women. Sharper was sentenced to 18 years in prison after he pleaded guilty.
- Long was co-counsel in the investigation and prosecution of celebrity bandleader Irvin Mayfield, and of his business partner Ronald Markham. Mayfield is the co-founder of the New Orleans Jazz Orchestra. On November 3, 2021, both Mayfield and Markham were sentenced to 18 months in prison for "egregious fraud" of "ripping off the public libraries" after pleading guilty to siphoning $1.3 million from the New Orleans Public Library Foundation.

=== Federal judicial service ===
On June 7, 2023, President Joe Biden announced his intent to nominate Long to serve as a United States district judge of the United States District Court for the Eastern District of Louisiana. Long was nominated as part of a bipartisan package of nominees which included Jerry Edwards Jr.. Nine members of the Congressional Black Caucus wrote a letter to President Joe Biden asking him to withdraw the nominations of Long and Jerry Edwards Jr. because the sole Democratic lawmaker from Louisiana, Representative Troy Carter, had not been properly consulted on multiple judicial nominations. On June 8, 2023, his nomination was sent to the Senate. President Biden nominated Long to the seat vacated by Judge Martin Leach-Cross Feldman, who died on January 26, 2022. Soon after the nomination was announced, Senator Bill Cassidy announced his support. On July 12, 2023, a hearing on his nomination was held before the Senate Judiciary Committee. During his confirmation hearing, Republican senators, including Senator Josh Hawley, pressed him on his role as deputy chief of staff to FBI Director Christopher Wray from 2020 to 2021 regarding a federal investigation of Hunter Biden and other allegations about the Justice Department that have angered conservatives. On July 12, 2023, U.S. Representative Steven Horsford sent a letter to Senate Judiciary chairman Dick Durbin saying the Congressional Black Caucus would oppose the Senate Judiciary Committee's consideration of Long, pending changes to the committee's "blue slip" policy. On September 14, 2023, his nomination was reported out of committee by a 16–5 vote. On December 14, 2023, the United States Senate confirmed his nomination by a 64–22 vote. He received his judicial commission on December 19, 2023. He was sworn in on December 21, 2023.

Legal offices
Preceded by Martin Leach-Cross Feldman	Judge of the United States District Court for the Eastern District of Louisiana; 2023–present	Incumbent
