= John M. Duhé Jr. =

American judge (1933–2025)

Senior Judge of the United States Court of Appeals for the Fifth Circuit
- In office April 7, 1999 – May 16, 2025

Judge of the United States Court of Appeals for the Fifth Circuit
- In office October 17, 1988 – April 7, 1999
- Appointed by: Ronald Reagan
- Preceded by: Albert Tate Jr.
- Succeeded by: Edith Brown Clement

Judge of the United States District Court for the Western District of Louisiana
- In office June 11, 1984 – November 9, 1988
- Appointed by: Ronald Reagan
- Preceded by: W. Eugene Davis
- Succeeded by: Richard T. Haik

Personal details
- Born: John Malcolm Duhé Jr. April 7, 1933 Iberia Parish, Louisiana, U.S.
- Died: May 16, 2025 (aged 92) New Iberia, Louisiana, U.S.
- Party: Republican
- Spouse: Dawn Marie Hébert
- Education: Tulane University (BA, LLB)

John Malcolm Duhé Jr. (April 7, 1933 – May 16, 2025) was a United States circuit judge of the New Orleans–based United States Court of Appeals for the Fifth Circuit.

== Education and career ==
Duhé received his Bachelor of Arts degree from Tulane University in New Orleans in 1955 and his Juris Doctor from the Tulane University Law School in 1957. He served as an attorney in private practice in New Iberia, Louisiana from 1957 to 1978.

== Judicial career ==
=== State court service ===
From 1979 to 1984, Duhé was judge of the Louisiana 16th Judicial District in New Iberia.

=== Federal judicial service ===
Duhé was nominated by President Ronald Reagan on May 15, 1984, to a seat on the United States District Court for the Western District of Louisiana vacated by Judge W. Eugene Davis. He was confirmed by the United States Senate on June 8, 1984, and received commission on June 11, 1984. His service terminated on November 9, 1988, due to elevation to the court of appeals.

Duhé was nominated by President Reagan on June 27, 1988, to a seat on the United States Court of Appeals for the Fifth Circuit vacated by Judge Albert Tate Jr. Duhé was confirmed by the Senate on October 14, 1988, and received commission on October 17, 1988. He assumed senior status on April 7, 1999. He took inactive senior status in 2011. His judicial service terminated upon his death on May 16, 2025.

Duhé's law clerks included Kyle Duncan of the United States Court of Appeals for the Fifth Circuit.

== Death ==
Duhé died in New Iberia, Louisiana on May 16, 2025, at the age of 92.

== Sources ==
Legal offices
Preceded by W. Eugene Davis	Judge of the United States District Court for the Western District of Louisiana; 1984–1988	Succeeded by Richard T. Haik
Preceded by Albert Tate Jr.	Judge of the United States Court of Appeals for the Fifth Circuit; 1988–1999	Succeeded by Edith Brown Clement
