= Kyle Duncan (judge) =

American judge (born 1972)

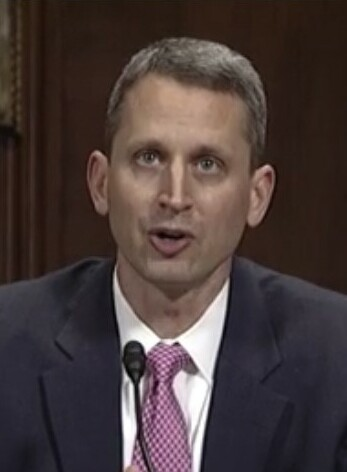
- Duncan in 2017

Judge of the United States Court of Appeals for the Fifth Circuit
- Incumbent
- Assumed office May 1, 2018
- Appointed by: Donald Trump
- Preceded by: W. Eugene Davis

Personal details
- Born: Stuart Kyle Duncan; 1972 (age 53–54) Baton Rouge, Louisiana, U.S.
- Education: Louisiana State University (BA, JD); Columbia University (LLM)

Stuart Kyle Duncan (born 1972) is a United States circuit judge of the United States Court of Appeals for the Fifth Circuit. Prior to his appointment to the Fifth Circuit by President Donald Trump, Duncan was prominent for working against LGBT rights, including leading efforts against same-sex marriage.

== Education ==
Duncan received a Bachelor of Arts, summa cum laude, from Louisiana State University and a Juris Doctor from the Paul M. Hebert Law Center, where he was inducted into the Order of the Coif and served as executive senior editor of the Louisiana Law Review. Duncan subsequently earned a Master of Laws from Columbia Law School.

== Early career ==
After graduating from law school, Duncan clerked for Louisiana-based Circuit Judge John M. Duhé Jr. of the Fifth Circuit.

From 2008 to 2012, Duncan served as appellate chief for Louisiana's Attorney General's office. Some media have incorrectly stated that Duncan served as Solicitor General of Louisiana during his time at the Attorney General's office, but the title of Solicitor General did not yet exist during the time that Duncan worked there. From 2012 to 2014, Duncan served as general counsel of the Becket Fund for Religious Liberty, where he managed Becket's nationwide public-interest litigation. He has been a member of the Federalist Society since 2012.

Duncan spent four years as an assistant professor of law at the University of Mississippi Law School. He also spent two years as an associate-in-law at Columbia University Law School, three years as an Assistant Solicitor General in the Office of the Solicitor General in the Texas Attorney General's Office, and one year in the appellate practice group at Vinson & Elkins LLP.

Duncan argued two cases before the Supreme Court of the United States, and has acted as lead counsel in numerous other cases in that Court, including Burwell v. Hobby Lobby Stores, Inc., 134 S.Ct. 2751 (2014), in which he successfully led litigation challenging the Affordable Care Act's contraceptive mandate on behalf of Hobby Lobby stores.

== Federal judicial service ==
On September 28, 2017, President Donald Trump announced his intent to nominate Duncan to an undetermined seat on the United States Court of Appeals for the Fifth Circuit. On October 2, 2017, he was officially nominated to the seat vacated by Judge W. Eugene Davis, who assumed senior status on December 31, 2016. On November 29, 2017, a hearing was held on his nomination before the Senate Judiciary Committee. Louisiana senator John Kennedy initially withheld his support for Kyle Duncan to serve as a federal appeals court judge, but ended up announcing he would support Duncan and praised his performance after his confirmation hearing.

On January 3, 2018, his nomination was returned to the President under Rule XXXI, Paragraph 6 of the United States Senate. On January 5, 2018, President Donald Trump announced his intent to renominate Duncan to a federal judgeship. On January 8, 2018, his renomination was sent to the Senate. On January 18, 2018, his nomination was reported out of committee by an 11–10 vote. Duncan's nomination was opposed by Democrats and supported by Republicans. On April 23, 2018, the Senate invoked cloture on Duncan's nomination by a 50–44 vote. On April 24, 2018, his nomination was confirmed by a 50–47 vote. He received his judicial commission on May 1, 2018.

=== LGBT rights ===
Duncan often worked against LGBT groups in private practice, which led many advocacy groups to oppose his nomination for judgeship. In 2015, Duncan argued before the Supreme Court against the constitutionality of same-sex marriage. In 2021, The Washington Blade characterized him as leading efforts to defend state bans on same-sex marriage. When the Supreme Court ruled in Obergefell v. Hodges, Duncan described the decision as an "abject failure" that "imperils civic peace", and he asserted that the decision "raises a question about the legitimacy of the court."

Duncan represented the birth mother of three children who refused to give her former same-sex spouse visitation rights to the children. He represented the school board in G.G. v. Gloucester County School Board in a suit brought by a transgender student, Gavin Grimm, over bathroom access. He also defended in courts North Carolina's bathroom bill that prohibited transgender students from using the bathroom that corresponded to their gender identity.

While he was a judge on the Fifth Circuit, Duncan refused to identify a transgender defendant by their assumed name and preferred gender pronouns. Duncan noted, "Congress has said nothing to prohibit courts from referring to litigants according to their biological sex, rather than according to their subjective gender identity".

=== Stanford Law School protest ===
On March 9, 2023, Duncan arrived to Stanford Law School in order to participate in a discussion on "Guns, Covid and Twitter," having been invited by the university's Federalist Society chapter. The event became a cause célèbre, and was marked by protests led by the student coalition Identity and Rights Affirmers for Trans Equality (IRATE) after a request for his speech to be canceled was denied. According to The Stanford Daily, "Throughout Duncan's speech, student protesters booed and made various loud comments, frequently drowning out his voice. In fliers put up in advance of the event, protesters called Duncan a right-wing advocate for laws that would harm women, immigrants and LGBTQ+ people." After ten minutes of protests had occurred, Duncan, according to David Lat writing in the Original Jurisdiction, "became angry, departed from his prepared remarks, and laced into the hecklers." On March 11, Stanford president Marc Tessier-Lavigne and Stanford Law dean Jennifer Martínez issued a letter of apology to Duncan, writing that students may "exercise their right to protest but not to disrupt the proceedings."

== Notable cases ==
Duncan wrote for the court in In re Larry Swearingen, No. 19-20565, denying the fourth habeas corpus petition and a delay of execution for Larry Swearingen, who was convicted of the 1998 murder of Melissa Trotter. While Swearingen maintained his innocence, Duncan stated that the latest petition did not meet the requirements for a federal habeas corpus petition. The latest appeal was made based upon two letters from Brady Mills, director of the Texas crime lab. Mills' first letter noted that the criminologist used the terms "unique" and "to the exclusion of others" to describe the piece of pantyhose found in Swearingen's home matching the piece of pantyhose used to murder Trotter. Mills noted this was "common language throughout the forensic community, at the time" but would not be used today. Mills' second letter addressed the testimony regarding blood found under Trotter's fingernails that did not match Swearingen's as being a product of contamination. The letter stated that the blood could have been from contamination but also could have been evidence. The court noted that these "'new' claims in this latest phase could not possibly have made any difference to the outcome of his trial" and have "not come close to establishing that 'no reasonable fact-finder' would have found him guilty." Following a failed petition to the U.S. Supreme Court, Swearingen was executed by the State of Texas on August 22, 2019.

In United States v. Varner, Duncan denied a pro se motion to change the name on the judgment from Norman Varner to Kathrine Nicole Jett. The opinion attracted attention for also rejecting a request to refer to Varner with feminine pronouns, and going at length into perceived problems with granting such a request. Judge James L. Dennis, a Clinton appointee, dissented and wrote that Duncan misconstrued the motion. In Dennis's view, it was merely a polite request that this specific proceeding use Varner's pronouns, usually granted as a courtesy; not an overarching demand requiring six pages of obiter dictum about the threat of courts being forced to use custom pronouns everywhere. Dennis also wrote that there was no need to rule on the matter at all. The ruling attracted attention from LGBT advocates, who saw it as confirmation of their warnings about Duncan prior to his confirmation as a judge. It has also been described as characteristic of the socially conservative jurisprudence that has won Duncan scholarly acclaim by his fellow social conservatives in academia (such as Adrian Vermeule).

Duncan penned the court's opinion in Hill v. Washburne regarding Albert Hill III's challenge to the validity of his late father Albert Hill Jr.'s will. Hill III is the great-grandson of late Texas oil tycoon H.L. Hunt and had previously agreed to a nine-figure settlement in exchange for not contesting the will of his father, Hill Jr. This is one of many challenges resulting from the estate of H.L. Hunt, who died in 1974, and the fifth challenge to the Hill Jr./Hill III settlement agreement. Hill III's sisters asked the court to enforce the settlement agreement and permanently enjoin any challenges to their father's will, the district court agreed. Hill III challenged the district court's injunction but Duncan and the Fifth Circuit affirmed the injunction and remanded the case to the district court to determine if Hill III's sisters are entitled to additional costs and fees.

Duncan authored the Fifth Circuit's April 2020 opinion in In re Abbott, granting mandamus to uphold an order by Texas Governor Greg Abbott that temporarily banned abortions during the coronavirus pandemic. This opinion has received scholarly attention as an example of common-good constitutionalism, a socially conservative judicial philosophy recently proposed by Harvard Law professor Adrian Vermeule.

Duncan was on the three-judge panel which halted the Biden Administration's OSHA rules mandating COVID-19 vaccinations or weekly COVID testing in the workplaces with 100 employees or more. The Fifth Circuit stayed the implementation of the OSHA rules by a per curiam decision in BST Holdings, LLC v. OSHA. The court stated that "[b]ecause the petitions give cause to believe there are grave statutory and constitutional issues with the Mandate, the Mandate is hereby stayed pending further action by this court."

In May 2026, Duncan ruled to restrict the mailing of mifepristone prescriptions, one of the most common means of abortion in the U.S. The anti-abortion ruling drew criticism from the Associated Press.

== See also ==
- Donald Trump judicial appointment controversies
- Donald Trump Supreme Court candidates

Legal offices
Preceded by W. Eugene Davis	Judge of the United States Court of Appeals for the Fifth Circuit; 2018–present	Incumbent
