= Richard Johnson Putnam =

American judge

Senior Judge of the United States District Court for the Western District of Louisiana
- In office December 19, 1975 – December 16, 2002

Judge of the United States District Court for the Western District of Louisiana
- In office September 18, 1961 – December 19, 1975
- Appointed by: John F. Kennedy
- Preceded by: Seat established by 75 Stat. 80
- Succeeded by: W. Eugene Davis

Personal details
- Born: Richard Johnson Putnam; September 27, 1913 Abbeville, Louisiana
- Died: December 16, 2002 (aged 89) Abbeville, Louisiana
- Education: Spring Hill College (B.S.); Loyola University New Orleans College of Law (LL.B.)

Richard Johnson Putnam (September 27, 1913 – December 16, 2002) was a United States district judge of the United States District Court for the Western District of Louisiana.

== Education and career ==
Born in Abbeville, Louisiana, Putnam received a Bachelor of Science degree from Spring Hill College in 1934 and a Bachelor of Laws from Loyola University New Orleans College of Law in 1937. He was in private practice in Abbeville from 1937 to 1954. He was a United States Naval Reserve Lieutenant during World War II, from 1942 to 1945. He was district attorney of the Fifteenth Judicial Circuit of Louisiana from 1948 to 1954. He was a judge of the Fifteenth Judicial District of Louisiana from 1954 to 1961. He was a judge of the Louisiana Court of Appeal for the First Circuit from 1960 to 1961.

== Federal judicial service ==
Putnam was nominated by President John F. Kennedy on September 5, 1961, to the United States District Court for the Western District of Louisiana, to a new seat created by 75 Stat. 80. He was confirmed by the United States Senate on September 14, 1961, and received his commission on September 18, 1961. He assumed senior status due to a certified disability on December 19, 1975. Putnam served in that capacity until his death on December 16, 2002, in Abbeville.

== Sources ==
Legal offices
Preceded by Seat established by 75 Stat. 80	Judge of the United States District Court for the Western District of Louisiana; 1961–1975	Succeeded by W. Eugene Davis
