= List of justices of the Louisiana Supreme Court =

Following is a list of justices of the Louisiana Supreme Court and their years of service.

== Territory of Orleans (1804–1812) ==
(three judges)

- John Bartow Prevost 1804–1806
- Ephraim Kirby 1804 (died en route to New Orleans)
- Peter Stephen Du Ponceau 1804 (declined Jefferson's appointment)
- William Sprigg 1806–1808
- George Mathews Jr. 1806–1813
- Joshua Lewis 1807–1813
- John Thompson 1808–1810
- Francois Xavier Martin 1810–1813

== State of Louisiana (1813 to the present) ==
=== Constitution of 1812 ===
(three to five judges appointed by the governor)

- Dominic Augustin Hall 1813, Presiding Judge
- Pierre Derbigny 1813–1820
- George Mathews Jr. 1813–1836, Presiding Judge
- Francois Xavier Martin 1815–1836;
- Alexander Porter 1821–1833
- Henry Adams Bullard 1834–1839
- Francois Xavier Martin 1836–1846, Presiding Judge
- Henry Carleton 1837–1839
- Pierre Adolphe Rost 1839
- George Eustis Sr. 1839
- George Strawbridge 1839
- Rice Garland 1840–1846
- Alonzo Morphy 1839–1846
- Henry Adams Bullard 1840–1846
- Florent Edouard Simon 1840–1846

=== Constitution of 1845 ===
(three associate justices and one chief justice)

- Pierre Adolphe Rost 1846–1854
- George Eustis Sr. 1846–1853, Chief Justice
- George Rogers King 1846–1850
- Thomas Slidell 1846–1853; 1853–1855, Chief Justice
- Isaac Trimble Preston 1850–1852

=== Constitution of 1852 ===
(four associate justices elected in districts and one chief justice elected at-large)

- William Dunbar 1852–1853
- Cornelius Voorhies 1853–1859
- Alexander McKenzie Buchanan 1853–1862
- Abner Nash Ogden 1853–1855
- James G. Campbell 1853–1854
- Henry M. Spofford 1854–1858
- James Neilson Lea 1855–1857
- Edwin T. Merrick 1855–1865, Chief Justice
- James L. Cole 1857–1860
- Thomas T. Land 1858–1865
- Albert Voorhies 1859–1865
- Albert Duffel 1860–1865
- Pierre Emile Bonford 1863–1864
- Thomas Courtland Manning 1864–1865

=== Constitution of 1864 ===
(four associate justices and one chief justice appointed by the governor for 8 year terms)

- William B. Hyman 1865–1868, Chief Justice
- Zenon Labauve Jr. 1865–1868

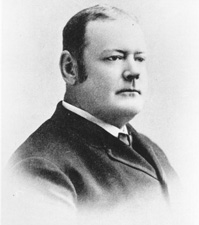
Justice Edward Douglass White, who later became Chief Justice of the United States

- Rufus K. Howell 1865–1877
- John Henry Ilsley 1865–1868
- Robert Byron Jones 1865–1866
- James G. Taliaferro 1866–1876
- John T. Ludeling 1868–1877, Chief Justice
- William Gillespie Wyly 1868–1876
- William Wirt Howe 1868–1872
- John H. Kennard 1872–1873
- Philip H. Morgan 1873–1877
- John E. Leonard 1876–1877
- John Edward King 1877
- Thomas Courtland Manning 1877–1880, Chief Justice
- Robert Hardin Marr 1877–1880
- Alcibiade De Blanc 1877–1880
- William B. Giles Egan 1877–1878
- William B. Spencer 1877–1880
- Edward Douglass White 1879–1880

=== Constitution of 1879 ===
(four associate justices and one chief justice appointed by the governor for 12 year terms)

- Edouard Bermudez 1880–1892, Chief Justice
- Felix Pierre Poché 1880–1890
- Robert Barr Todd 1880–1888
- William M. Levy 1880–1882
- Charles Erasmus Fenner 1880–1893
- Thomas Courtland Manning 1882–1886
- Samuel D. McEnery 1888–1891
- Lynn B. Watkins 1886–1901
- Joseph Arsenne Breaux 1890–1904; 1904–1914, Chief Justice
- Francis T. Nicholls 1892–1904; 1904–1911, Chief Justice
- Charles Parlange 1893–1894
- Henry C. Miller 1894–1899
- Newton C. Blanchard 1897–1903

=== Constitution of 1898 ===
(five justices appointed by the governor, with the chief justice determined by time in service)

- Frank A. Monroe 1899–1914; 1914–1921, Chief Justice
- Olivier O. Provosty 1901–1922; 1922, Chief Justice
- Alfred D. Land 1903–1917
- Walter B. Sommerville 1911–1921
- Joseph Arsenne Breaux 1904–1914, Chief Justice

=== Constitution of 1913 ===
(five justices elected by the people, with the chief justice determined by time in service)

- Charles Austin O'Niell 1914–1922; 1922–1949, Chief Justice
- Paul Leche 1917–1919
- Benjamin C. Dawkins Sr. 1918–1924

=== Constitution of 1921 ===
(seven justices elected by the people, with the chief justice determined by time in service)

- Joshua G. Baker 1921–1922
- Robert Reid 1923–1923
- David N. Thompson 1922–1930
- Winston Overton 1921–1934
- John St. Paul 1922–1934
- John R. Land 1921–1941
- Wynne Grey Rogers 1922–1946
- Harney Felix Brunot 1923–1936
- Frederick M. Odom 1931–1945
- Archibald T. Higgins 1934–1945
- John B. Fournet 1935–1970; 1949–1970, Chief Justice
- Amos Lee Ponder Jr. 1937–1959
- Robert F. Kennon 1945–1946
- E. Howard McCaleb Jr. 1941–1943; 1947–1970; 1971–1972, Chief Justice
- Frank W. Hawthorne 1945–1968
- Joe Busbey Hamiter 1943–1970; Chief Justice 1970
- Nathaniel W. Bond 1947–1948
- Harold A. Moise 1948–1958
- J. Cleveland Frugé 1949
- Samuel A. LeBlanc I 1949–1954
- James D. Simon 1955–1960
- Albert Tate Jr. 1970–1979
- Walter B. Hamlin 1958–1972; 1972–1973, Chief Justice
- Rene A. Viosca 1959–1960
- Joe W. Sanders 1960–1973; 1973–1978, Chief Justice
- Frank Summers 1960–1978; 1979–1980, Chief Justice
- Mack E. Barham 1968–1975
- John Allen Dixon Jr. 1971–1980; 1980–1990, Chief Justice
- Pascal F. Calogero Jr. 1973–1990; 1990–2008, Chief Justice
- Walter F. Marcus Jr. 1973–2000

=== Constitution of 1974 ===
(seven justices elected in single-member districts after reapportionment by legislation effective in the year 2000; the chief justice is determined seniority of service)

- James L. Dennis 1975–1995
- Fred A. Blanche Jr. 1979–1986
- Jack C. Watson 1979–1996
- Harry T. Lemmon 1980–2001
- Luther F. Cole 1986–1992
- Pike Hall Jr. 1990–1994
- Catherine D. Kimball 1992–2009; 2009–2013, Chief Justice
- Revius Ortique Jr. 1993–1994
- Bernette Joshua Johnson 1994–2020; 2013–2020, Chief Justice
- Jeffrey P. Victory 1995–2014
- E. Joseph Bleich 1996
- Jeannette Knoll 1997–2016
- Chet D. Traylor 1997–2009
- John L. Weimer 2001–present; 2021–present, Chief Justice
- Greg G. Guidry 2009–2019
- Marcus R. Clark 2009–2020
- Jefferson D. Hughes III 2013–present
- Scott J. Crichton 2015–2025
- James T. Genovese 2017–2024
- William J. Crain 2019–2025
- Jay McCallum 2021–present
- Piper D. Griffin 2021–present
- John Guidry 2025–present
- Cade Cole 2025–present
- Billy Burris 2026–present
