= John Allen Dixon Jr. =

American judge (1920–2003)

Chief Justice of the Louisiana Supreme Court
- In office March 1, 1980 – April 8, 1990
- Preceded by: Frank Summers
- Succeeded by: Pascal F. Calogero Jr.

Associate Justice of the Louisiana Supreme Court
- In office January 4, 1971 – February 29, 1980
- Preceded by: E. Howard McCaleb
- Succeeded by: Harry T. Lemmon

Personal details
- Born: April 8, 1920 Orange, Texas
- Died: February 22, 2003 (aged 82) Shreveport, Louisiana
- Spouse: Imogene Shipley (m. October 1945)
- Children: Three daughters
- Education: Centenary College, Tulane University Law School
- Occupation: Judge, Attorney

John Allen Dixon Jr. (April 8, 1920 – February 22, 2003) was an associate justice of the Louisiana Supreme Court from January 4, 1971 to February 29, 1980, and chief justice from March 1, 1980 to April 8, 1990.

== Early life, education, and career ==
Born in Orange, Texas, Dixon's family moved to Shreveport in 1930, where he graduated from Fair Park High School in 1936 and from Centenary College in 1940. He taught at Tallulah High School from the fall of 1940 to February 1942.

== Military service and legal career ==
In February 1942, shortly after the entry of the United States into World War II, Dixon enlisted in the United States Army, ultimately serving with the 505th Parachute Infantry Regiment. Captured during the Allied invasion of Sicily, he was held as a prisoner of war for twenty-one months, including 19 months in the Stalag VII-A POW camp, and a sixty-day forced march across Poland as the German forces were retreating from the advancing Russians. Dixon was discharged as a staff sergeant in October 1945, and entered Tulane University Law School, receiving an LL.B. from that institution in 1947, where he was also a member of the Tulane Law Review. He entered the practice of law with the firm of Booth, Lockard and Jack, and in 1954 formed a new law partnership with his brother, Neil Dixon, where he remained for three years.

== Judicial career ==
In 1957, Dixon was elected as a judge of the First Judicial District of Louisiana in Caddo Parish, and he was twice re-elected to that seat. In 1968, he was elected to the Louisiana Second Circuit Court of Appeal, and in 1970 was elected without opposition to the state supreme court, taking his seat in January 1971. On March 1, 1980, he became chief justice. On the court, he was generally considered to be a liberal, because he "championed the cause of the little man", though he "preferred to call himself a strict constructionist".

Dixon made his retirement announcement in March 1990, the month after his 70th birthday, on April 8. Though Dixon was exempt from a constitutional provision requiring judges to retire at that age, he had previously supported this requirement in a case, and acted consistently with this ruling. The day after his retirement, Dixon swore in his successor as chief justice, Pascal F. Calogero Jr. In 1991, he was awarded the American Civil Liberties Union's Benjamin E. Smith award "for a lifetime of defending civil rights and civil liberties".

== Personal life and death ==
Dixon married Imogene Shipley in October 1945, the same month that he was discharged from the Army. They had three daughters; his wife died before him.

During his time as a district court judge, Dixon was introduced to running as a hobby, though he initially only participated in the sport for a few years. While serving as chief justice, Dixon rediscovered his interest in long-distance running, completing several marathons and many shorter long-distance races. He placed first in the over-60 age group in the 1982 Mardi Gras Marathon, and completed the Boston Marathon that same year.

Dixon died in his home in Shreveport in 2003, at the age of 82.

Political offices
Preceded by Frank Summers	Chief Justice of the Louisiana Supreme Court; 1980–1990	Succeeded by Pascal F. Calogero Jr.
Political offices
Preceded by E. Howard McCaleb	Justice of the Louisiana Supreme Court; 1971–1980	Succeeded by Harry T. Lemmon
