= Justice Land =

Justice Land may refer to:

- Alfred D. Land (1842–1917), associate justice of the Louisiana Supreme Court
- Benjamin Land (fl. 1980s–2020s), associate justice of the Georgia Supreme Court
- John R. Land (1862–1941), associate justice of the Louisiana Supreme Court
- Thomas Thompson Land (1815–1893), associate justice of the Louisiana Supreme Court
