= Justice Voorhies =

Justice Voorhies may refer to:

- Albert Voorhies (1829–1913), associate justice of the Louisiana Supreme Court
- Cornelius Voorhies (1804–1859), associate justice of the Louisiana Supreme Court

== See also ==
- John Van Voorhis (judge) (1897-1983), chief judge of the New York Court of Appeals
- Henry M. Vories (1810–1876), associate justice of the Supreme Court of Missouri
- Judge Voorhees (disambiguation)
