= Samuel A. LeBlanc I =

American judge (1886–1955)

Samuel Albert LeBlanc, I

Louisiana State Representative for Assumption Parish
- In office 1912–1916
- Preceded by: Henry A. LeBlanc
- Succeeded by: Clay J. Dugas; Charles H. Munson

Personal details
- Born: August 29, 1886 Paincourtville; Assumption Parish; Louisiana, USA
- Died: July 8, 1955 (aged 68)
- Party: Democratic
- Spouse: Elmire Lafaye (married 1912-1955, his death)
- Relations: Sam A. LeBlanc III (grandson)
- Parent(s): Camille Dugas and Joseph E. LeBlanc
- Education: Tulane University; Tulane University School of Law
- Occupation: Lawyer and Judge

Samuel Albert LeBlanc (August 29, 1886 – July 8, 1955) was a justice of the Louisiana Supreme Court from December 12, 1949 to December 31, 1954.

Born at Paincourtville, Assumption Parish, Louisiana, to Col. Joseph E. LeBlanc and Camille (Dugas) LeBlanc, both natives of the same parish, and the latter being the daughter of Eloi F. X. Dugas, LeBlanc was the tenth of 11 children. He attended a private school in the locality in which he was born until attaining his eleventh year, when he entered Jefferson College, at Convent, Louisiana, graduating from that institution with the class of 1904. During the first year following his graduation he taught in Jefferson College, and during the next term at the Napoleonville school. During this time, as opportunity afforded, he also was reading law in the office of Marks & Wortham, at Napoleonville. Later he entered the law school of Tulane University, from which he received his J.D. in 1908. Shortly following his graduation he formed a professional partnership at Napoleonville and there began the practice of law under the firm name of Marks & LeBlanc. He was appointed by Governor Sanders as a member of the state board of public instruction, to fill an unexpired term. In 1912 he was elected to the Louisiana House of Representatives.

From 1920 to 1929, LeBlanc was a judge of Louisiana's 23rd Judicial District Court, for Assumption, Ascension, and St. James parishes. LeBlanc was then appointed to a seat on the Louisiana Court of Appeal for the First Circuit vacated by the elevation of judge Paul Leche to the state supreme court. LeBlanc was thereafter reelected to the court of appeals, serving until his own election to the Louisiana Supreme Court in 1949, where he remained until December 31, 1954.

On August 7, 1912, LeBlanc married Miss Elmire Lafaye, a daughter of J. Henry and Cecilia (Russeau) Lafaye, of New Orleans. They had a son, Samuel A. LeBlanc II, whose own son, Sam A. LeBlanc III, was also a prominent figure in Louisiana politics.

Political offices
Preceded by J. Cleveland Frugé	Justice of the Louisiana Supreme Court; 1949–1954	Succeeded by James D. Simon
Louisiana House of Representatives
Preceded by Henry A. LeBlanc	Louisiana State Representative for Assumption Parish; 1912–1916	Succeeded by Clay J. Dugas; Charles H. Munson
