= Justice Simon =

Justice Simon may refer to:

- Florent Edouard Simon (1799–1866), associate justice of the Louisiana Supreme Court
- James D. Simon (1897–1982), associate justice of the Louisiana Supreme Court
- Seymour Simon (1915–2006), associate justice of the Supreme Court of Illinois

== See also ==
- Judge Simon (disambiguation)
