= Joe W. Sanders =

American judge (1915–1994)

Chief Justice of the Louisiana Supreme Court
- In office March 14, 1973 – December 31, 1980
- Preceded by: Walter B. Hamlin
- Succeeded by: Frank Summers

Justice of the Louisiana Supreme Court
- In office November 7, 1960 – December 31, 1980
- Preceded by: James D. Simon
- Succeeded by: Walter F. Marcus Jr.

Personal details
- Born: Joe William Sanders; May 31, 1915; Pleasant Hill, Sabine Parish, Louisiana, U.S.
- Died: June 8, 1994 (aged 79)
- Education: Louisiana State University (BA, LLB)
- Profession: Judge

Joe William Sanders (May 31, 1915 – June 8, 1994) was a justice of the Louisiana Supreme Court from November 7, 1960, to December 31, 1980, serving as chief justice from March 14, 1973, to December 31, 1980.

Born in Pleasant Hill, Sabine Parish, Louisiana, Sanders was raised on a family farm in Sabine Parish. He received a BA from Louisiana State University in 1935, and an LL.B. from the same institution in 1938.

He succeeded James D. Simon.

Political offices
Preceded by James D. Simon	Justice of the Louisiana Supreme Court; 1960–1973	Succeeded by Walter F. Marcus Jr.
Preceded by Walter B. Hamlin	Chief Justice of the Louisiana Supreme Court; 1973–1980	Succeeded by Frank Summers
