= Edouard Bermudez =

American judge (1832–1892)

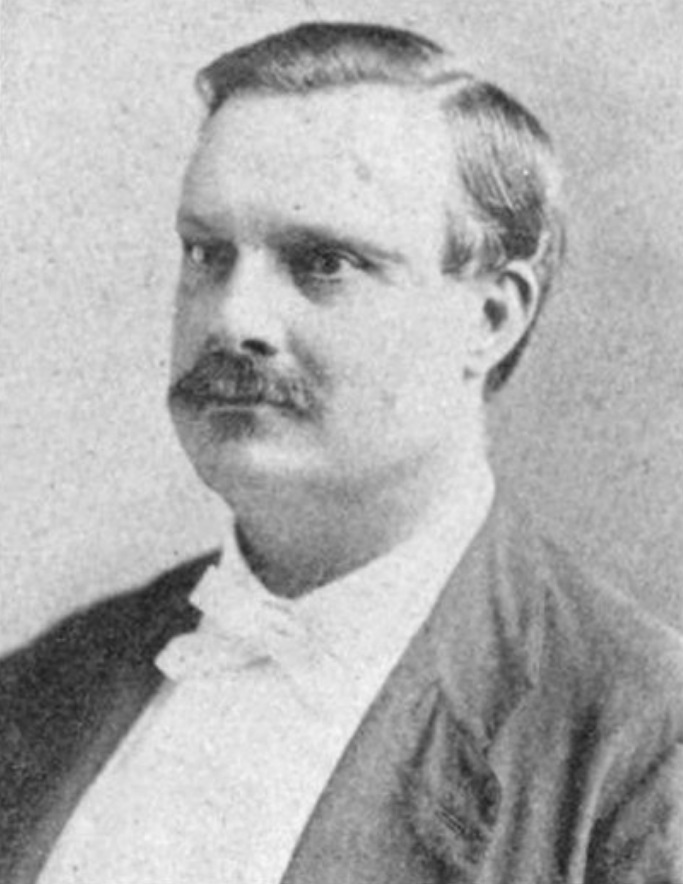
Edouard Bermudez

Edouard Edmund Bermudez (January 19, 1832 – August 22, 1892) was a Louisiana attorney who served as chief justice of the Louisiana Supreme Court from April 5, 1880 to April 5, 1892. He was the first Creole Chief Justice of the Louisiana Supreme Court.

== Early life, education, career, and military service ==
Born in New Orleans, Bermudez "was a Creole,—that is, a native-born Louisianian,—of ancient and distinguished Spanish descent". He attended Boyer's School in New Orleans, and received a classical education at Spring Hill College, Alabama, where he graduated in the year 1851. He read law in the Kentucky home of U.S. District Judge Thomas Bell Monroe, and then studied for six months at the Law Department of the University of Louisiana (later Tulane University), receiving an LL.B. in 1852. He gained admission to the bar the following year, at the age of 21, and was quickly successful as an attorney. He was a member of the state Secession Convention of 1861, where he "[o]pposed immediate secession, but voted to pass [the] final secession ordinance", and then served in the Army of the Confederacy during the American Civil War, serving as a judge advocate in Mobile, Alabama.

== Later life and judicial service ==
After the war, Bermudez was elected an assistant city attorney in 1866, but was removed from this position by General Philip Sheridan the following year "as an impediment to Reconstruction". Bermudez then returned to private practice, also mentoring young attorneys including Edward Douglass White, who went on to become Chief Justice of the United States. Bermudez received an LL.D. degree in 1876, and was appointed as the seventh Chief Justice of the Louisiana Supreme Court (and the first Chief Justice under the Constitution of 1879) in 1880. He remained in office for his full twelve-year term, "despite ill health in [his] final years".

== Personal life and death ==
Bermudez married Elizabeth Amanda Maupassant, with whom he had nine children, five of whom died young. He died at his home in New Orleans at the age of 60, due to heart disease, less than six months after completing his service on the court.

Political offices
| Preceded by Thomas Courtland Manning | Justice of the Louisiana Supreme Court; 1880–1892 | Succeeded by Francis T. Nicholls |
