= Joseph Leblanc =

Joseph Leblanc or LeBlanc may refer to:

- Joseph Leblanc dit Le Maigre (1697–1772), Acadian farmer and trader
- Joseph E. LeBlanc (1842–1902), Louisiana politician
- Joseph E. Leblanc (1916–1979), Canadian politician
