= Justice Somerville =

Justice Somerville or Sommerville may refer to:

- Henderson M. Somerville (1837–1915), associate justice of the Alabama Supreme Court
- Ormond Somerville (1868–1928), associate justice of the Alabama Supreme Court
- Ormond Somerville Jr. (1904–1998), associate justice of the Alabama Supreme Court
- Walter B. Sommerville (1854–1924), associate justice of the Louisiana Supreme Court
