= James L. Cole =

American judge (c. 1814–1883)

James Lawrence Cole (c. 1814 – February 14, 1883) was a justice of the Louisiana Supreme Court from April 6, 1857, to March 12, 1860, and officially from 1863 to 1865, although the court did not meet during the latter period.

Born in Philadelphia, Pennsylvania, Cole became a District Attorney in Louisiana's Historic Fifth Judicial District, covering Lafourche Parish, around 1846, and became a judge of that district around 1856. He initially served on the Louisiana Supreme Court from April 6, 1857, to March 12, 1860. During the American Civil War, Union forces occupied New Orleans attempted to reorganize the Judiciary, appointing Cole to his former position, but the court never actually organized. Cole was also active in the Louisiana state teachers' association, and later served as a judge of the Louisiana Historic Twenty-Third Judicial District, covering Iberville Parish, from 1880 until his death in 1883. He was noted for his extensive knowledge of Louisiana history and customs, and occasionally wrote newspaper pieces recounting these.

Cole died suddenly in New Orleans, and his body was transported to Iberville Parish for burial.

Political offices
| Preceded by James Neilson Lea | Justice of the Louisiana Supreme Court; 1857–1860; 1863–1865 | Succeeded by Albert Duffel |
