= Justice Merrick =

Justice Merrick may refer to:

- Edwin T. Merrick (1810–1897), associate justice of the Louisiana Supreme Court
- Pliny Merrick (1794–1867), associate justice of the Massachusetts Supreme Judicial Court
