= Hamiter =

Hamiter is a surname. Notable people with the surname include:

- Allen Hamiter (1867–1933), American politician
- Joe Busbey Hamiter (1899–1986), Justice of the Louisiana Supreme Court
- Uhuru Hamiter (born 1973), American football player
