= Pothan =

Pothan is a St Thomas Christian name that is the English equivalent to Paul. It may refer to

- Pothan Joseph (1892–1972), Indian journalist
- Dileesh Pothan, Indian film director and actor
- Pratap K. Pothen, Indian actor, director, writer, and producer
- Pothan Vava, a 2006 Malayalam film
