= Jim Lea =

Jim or James Lea may refer to:

- Jim Lea (sprinter) (1932–2010), American sprinter
- Jim Lea (musician) (born 1949), English bass guitarist
- James Neilson Lea (1815–1884), Louisiana politician and jurist
- James Lea (1824–1896), British architect of James & Lister Lea
