= Pierre Emile Bonford =

American judge (1820–1964)

Pierre Emile Bonford (sometimes reported as Peter Emile Bonford; 1820 – August 17, 1864) was a justice of the Louisiana Supreme Court from 1863 to 1864.

Bonford was "a distinguished and leading member of the New Orleans bar". Prior to the American Civil War, Bonford was associated with the law firm of Benjamin, Bonford & Finney. He was a member of the convention for the Louisiana secession. He subsequently accepted the position of aide-de-camp to Confederate General Richard Taylor, resigning from that position in March 1863 to accept an appointment from the Confederate State Government to the Louisiana Supreme Court. He served on the court until his death at Alexandria, Louisiana, Aug. 17, 1864.

Political offices
Preceded by Alexander McKenzie Buchanan	Justice of the Louisiana Supreme Court; 1863–1864	Succeeded by Thomas Courtland Manning
