= Justice Bond =

Justice Bond may refer to:

- Carroll Bond (1873–1943), chief justice of the Maryland Court of Appeals
- Henry Whitelaw Bond (1848–1919), associate justice of the Supreme Court of Missouri
- James A. C. Bond (1844–1930), associate justice of the Maryland Court of Appeals
- Nathaniel W. Bond (1892–1948), associate justice of the Louisiana Supreme Court
