= St Paul (surname) =

St Paul or St. Paul as a surname may refer to:

- Francis St. Paul (born 1979), American football wide receiver
- George St Paul (1562–1613), English politician
- Henry St Paul (1777–1820), English soldier and politician
- Sir Horace St Paul, 1st Baronet (1775–1840), English soldier and politician
- Sir Horace St Paul, 2nd Baronet (1812–1891), English politician
- John St. Paul (1867–1939), Justice of the Louisiana Supreme Court
