= Joseph E. LeBlanc =

American politician (1842–1902)

Joseph E. LeBlanc (1842 – November 21, 1902) was a Louisiana politician.

Born in Assumption Parish, Louisiana in the year 1842, at the beginning of the American Civil War, he enlisted, as was required by law, in the Confederate army as a member of Co. H, 28th La. regiment, and participated in several engagements, including the Siege of Vicksburg. He enlisted as a private, but was promoted for gallant conduct in battle. Returning home, he was made deputy sheriff, and served as a member of the school board during the administration of Governor Francis T. Nicholls. In 1880 he was elected clerk of the district court for a term of 4 years. In 1884 he engaged in mercantile business, handling general merchandise and agricultural implements. In 1888 Col. LeBlanc was elected to the Louisiana House of Representatives, to represent Assumption Parish, and during the succeeding sessions of the legislature served as chairman of the committee on enrollment. In 1892 he was renominated, but withdrew from the contest. In 1894 he was elected to the Louisiana State Senate, succeeding the late Sen. J. S. Perkins. He was re-elected in 1900, serving until his death.

LeBlanc married Camille Dugas, who survived him, and who was the daughter of Eloi F. X. Dugas, who also served in the state legislature. LeBlanc and his wife had eleven children, including Samuel A. LeBlanc, who was a justice of the Louisiana Supreme Court in the 1940s and 1950s.
