= William B. Hyman =

American judge (1814–1884)

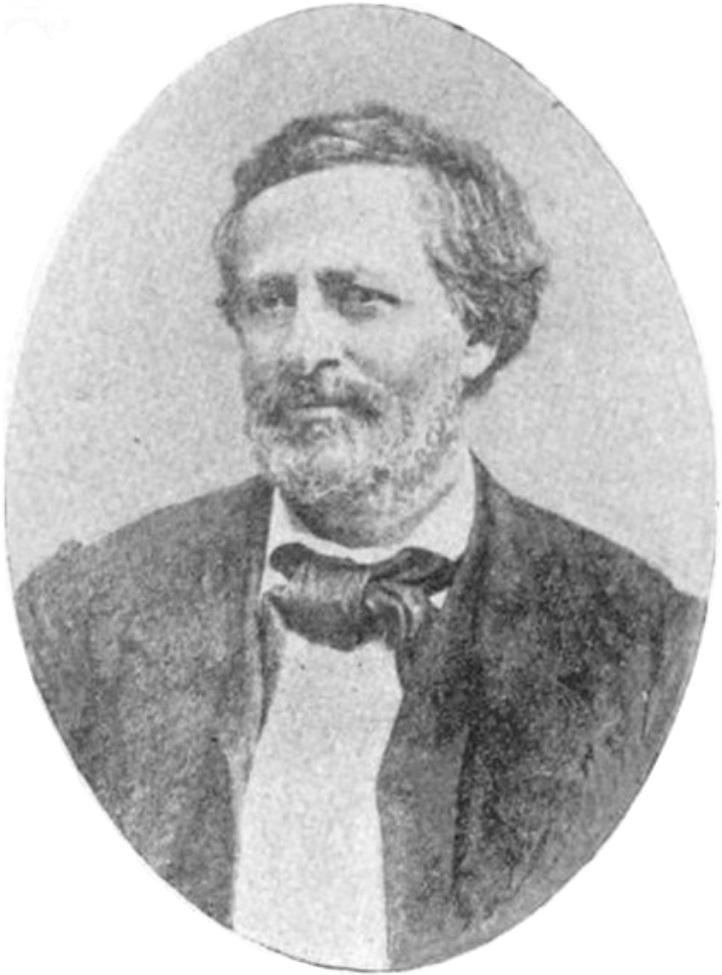

William Bryan Hyman (April 30, 1814 – August 9, 1884) was chief justice of the Louisiana Supreme Court from April 3, 1865 to November 1, 1868.

== Career ==
Born in Martin County, North Carolina, Hyman graduated from the University of North Carolina in 1939 and gained admission to the bar the same year. He moved to Alexandria, Louisiana around 1840.

Hyman "[o]pposed secession and swore allegiance to the United States when Union Army occupied Alexandria". On April 1, 1865, Governor James Madison Wells appointed Hyman as Chief Justice of Louisiana. He was the fourth Chief Justice of Louisiana, also serving as a parish judge in Rapides from 1865 to 1869. After his retirement from the supreme bench he became parish judge of Jefferson, and later parish surveyor.

== Personal life and death ==
In 1847, Hyman married Hermenegildo Dolores Gonzales, with whom he had five children.

On August 9, 1884, Hyman died on his Louisiana plantation at the age of 70. He was interred in Carrollton Cemetery, in New Orleans.

Political offices
Preceded by Newly reconstituted court	Justice of the Louisiana Supreme Court; 1865–1868	Succeeded by John T. Ludeling
