= Alonzo Morphy =

American judge (1798–1856)

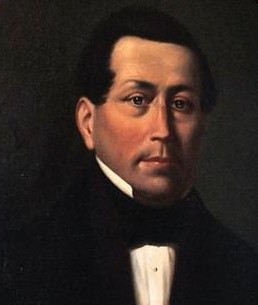
1886 painting by William Buck

Alonzo Michael Morphy (November 23, 1798 – November 22, 1856) was a lawyer serving as Attorney General of Louisiana from 1828 to 1830, and a justice of the Louisiana Supreme Court from August 31, 1839 to March 19, 1846, and father to Paul Morphy.

== Biography ==
Born in Charleston, South Carolina, Morphy was of Spanish and Irish ancestry. Morphy moved to Louisiana, and read law under Edward Livingston. He served in the state legislature, and was also Attorney General of Louisiana. Morphy married Louise Thérèse Félicité Thelcide Le Carpentier, the musically talented daughter of a prominent French Creole family. His home was an atmosphere of genteel civility and culture where chess and music were the typical highlights of a Sunday home gathering. His son, Paul Morphy, is considered one of the greatest chess players of all time.

Political offices
Preceded by Pierre Adolphe Rost	Justice of the Louisiana Supreme Court; 1839–1846	Succeeded by George Rogers King
