= Henry C. Miller =

American judge (1828–1899)

Henry Carleton Miller (February 1, 1828 – March 4, 1899) was a justice of the Louisiana Supreme Court from February 1, 1894, to March 4, 1899.

Born in Covington, Louisiana. Miller attended private schools and thereafter read law without supervision to gain admission to the bar in 1851. Miller was a United States Attorney from 1856 to 1861, and a Confederate States of America District Attorney during the American Civil War, from 1861 to 1865, appointed to the latter position by Confederate president Jefferson Davis. Later in life, Miller became a professor of law at Tulane University Law School, teaching admiralty and marine law, international law, and jurisdiction and practice of courts of admiralty. He was elected dean of the law school in 1889.

Miller became a justice of the Louisiana Supreme Court in 1894, and served until his death, in New Orleans, on March 4, 1899. Miller died in his home shortly after an operation intended to relieve a bout of intense pain in his intestines. Although the operation was deemed a success, and the pain was alleviated, he shortly thereafter lapsed into a coma, from which he never recovered.

Miller was married to Louisa Knox of St. Landry Parish. He was a member of The Boston Club of New Orleans.

Political offices
Preceded by Charles Parlange	Justice of the Louisiana Supreme Court; 1894–1899	Succeeded by Frank A. Monroe
