= George Rogers King =

American judge (1807–1871)

George Rogers King (1807–March 21, 1871) was a justice of the Louisiana Supreme Court from March 19, 1846, to March 1, 1850.

Born in St. Landry Parish, Louisiana, his father was state court judge George King. King graduated from the University of Virginia, and served successively in Louisiana State Legislature from 1820 to 1821, then as a district attorney, then as a district judge of the Louisiana Fifth Judicial District Court from 1841 to 1846, and finally as an associate justice of the state supreme court. He was again elected to the state legislature in 1850, and also established a law practice in Opelousas, in his native parish.

King died in Opelousas in his early 60s.

Political offices
Preceded by Alonzo Morphy	Justice of the Louisiana Supreme Court; 1846–1850	Succeeded by Isaac T. Preston
