= Henry M. Spofford =

American judge

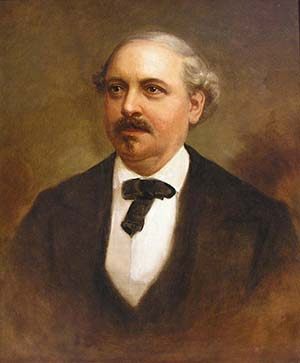

Justice of the Louisiana Supreme Court
- In office November 1, 1858 – November 6, 1854
- Preceded by: James G. Campbell
- Succeeded by: Thomas T. Land

Personal details
- Born: September 8, 1821 Gilmanton, New Hampshire
- Died: August 8, 1880 (aged 58) Red Sulphur Springs, West Virginia, United States

Henry Martyn Spofford (September 8, 1821 – August 20, 1880) was a judge of the Louisiana Supreme Court, born in Gilmanton, New Hampshire. He graduated from Amherst College and relocated to Louisiana, in 1845, where he practiced law. Spofford was elected to the Louisiana Supreme Court and served until 1858, when he resigned to return to his law practice. He was a member of The Boston Club of New Orleans.

Spofford was married on January 7, 1861, to Ophelia Jane Martin (1832-1894), daughter of Judge Thomas Martin of Pulaski, Tennessee. They had three children: Eleanor Spofford, Thomas Martin Spofford and Nina Spofford.

Spofford co-authored the book "The Louisiana Magistrate, and Parish Officers’ Guide" with his law partner, Historic Eighteenth District Court colleague Judge Edward Olcott He was the District Attorney in the Louisiana Historic Seventeenth Judicial District in Caddo Parish from 1850 to 1852 and then was the judge for the Louisiana Historic Eighteenth Judicial District Court in Caddo Parish from 1852 to 1854.

Spofford was elected in 1877 to the United States Senate by one of two contesting Louisiana legislatures after the disputed election of 1876, but he was never seated.

After the contested election of 1876, Democrat-backed legislature, allied with Democratic Governor Francis T. Nicholls selected Spofford as United States Senator. However the Republican-dominated legislature allied with Republican Governor Stephen B. Packard had separately selected William Pitt Kellogg. The United States Senate, which was at the time dominated by the so-called Radical faction of the Republican party, refused to seat Spofford.

He died in Red Sulphur Springs, West Virginia.

== See also ==
- List of United States senators from Louisiana at Class 3

== Notes ==
Political offices
Preceded by James G. Campbell	Justice of the Louisiana Supreme Court; 1854–1858	Succeeded by Thomas T. Land
