= J. Cleveland Frugé =

American judge (1900–1991)

Joseph Cleveland Frugé (1900 – 1991) was a justice of the Louisiana Supreme Court from September 8, 1949, to December 12, 1949.

Born near Basile, Louisiana, Frugé received his law degree from Loyola Law School in 1922, and entered the private practice of law. He served in the Louisiana House of Representatives from 1928 to 1930, when he became an Assistant District Attorney in the Thirteenth Judicial District. In 1935 he became a Louisiana District Court judge, holding that office until 1954, interrupted by a temporary appointment to the Louisiana Supreme Court to fill out the remaining three months of the term of retiring Chief Justice Charles Austin O'Niell. From 1960 until his retirement in 1979, Frugé served as a judge of the Louisiana Third Circuit Court of Appeal.

Political offices
Preceded by Charles Austin O'Niell	Justice of the Louisiana Supreme Court; 1949–1949	Succeeded by Samuel A. LeBlanc I
