= Archibald T. Higgins =

American judge (c. 1894–1945)

Justice of the Louisiana Supreme Court
- In office September 19, 1934 – October 3, 1945
- Preceded by: John St. Paul
- Succeeded by: Robert F. Kennon

Member of the Louisiana House of Representatives
- In office 1920–1924

Personal details
- Born: circa 1894
- Died: October 3, 1945
- Education: Tulane University Law School

Archibald T. Higgins (c. 1894 – October 3, 1945) was a justice of the Louisiana Supreme Court from September 19, 1934, to October 3, 1945.

Higgins received his law degree at Tulane University Law School in 1916, and entered private practice the same year, serving as city attorney of Gretna, Louisiana from 1916 to 1918. Higgins served two terms in the Louisiana House of Representatives, from 1920 to 1924, and then for several years as an assistant district attorney. He was appointed as an appellate court judge in 1929. In 1934, Higgins was elected to a seat on the state supreme court vacated by Justice John St. Paul, but prior to the end of the previous term, Justice Winston Overton died, and Higgins was instead appointed to succeed Overton.

Political offices
Preceded by John St. Paul	Justice of the Louisiana Supreme Court; 1934–1945	Succeeded by Robert F. Kennon
