= Philip H. Morgan =

American judge

Philip Hicky Morgan
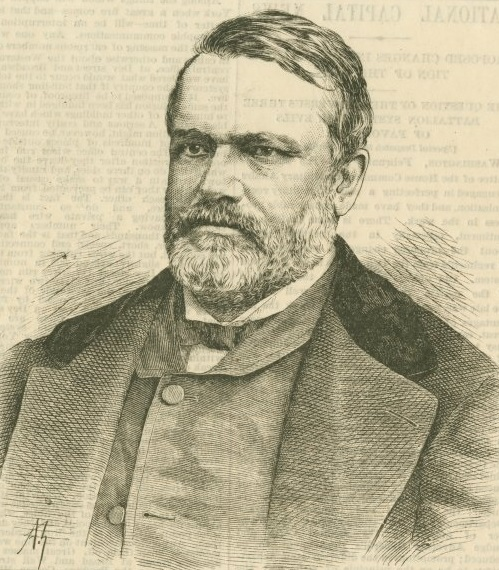

41st United States Minister to Mexico
- In office January 26, 1880 – June 6, 1885
- President: Rutherford B. Hayes
- Preceded by: John W. Foster
- Succeeded by: Henry R. Jackson

Judge of the International Tribunal
- In office 1876–1880
- Preceded by: None (position created)
- Succeeded by: Elbert E. Farman

Associate Justice of the Louisiana Supreme Court
- In office 1873–1876
- Preceded by: John H. Kennard
- Succeeded by: John E. Leonard

United States Attorney for the District of Louisiana
- In office 1869–1870
- Preceded by: Samuel H. Torrey
- Succeeded by: Alanson B. Long
- In office 1866–1867
- Preceded by: Samuel H . Torrey
- Succeeded by: Samuel H. Torrey

Personal details
- Born: November 9, 1825 Baton Rouge, Louisiana, U.S.
- Died: August 12, 1900 (aged 74) New York, New York, U.S.
- Resting place: Allegheny Cemetery in Pittsburgh, Pennsylvania
- Party: Republican
- Spouse: Beatrice Leslie Ford (m. 1852-1900, his death)
- Children: 9
- Profession: Lawyer

Philip H. Morgan (November 9, 1825 – August 12, 1900) was an attorney, jurist, and diplomat from Louisiana who remained loyal to the Union during the American Civil War. A Republican, among the offices in which he served were Associate Justice of the Louisiana Supreme Court (1873-1877), Judge of the International Tribunal in Alexandria, Egypt (1878-1880), and Minister to Mexico (1880-1885).

== Biography ==
Philip Hicky Morgan (sometimes spelled "Hickey") was born in Baton Rouge on August 9, 1825, a son of Thomas Gibbes (sometimes spelled "Gibbs") Morgan and the former Eliza Ann McKennan. He was named for Colonel Philip Hicky, a Louisiana plantation owner and friend of his father. He was educated locally and then attended the University of Paris in France from 1841 to 1846. He was fluent in several languages, including French and Spanish, and translated Louisiana's civil code into both languages.

Morgan joined the military for the Mexican–American War and attained the rank of first lieutenant as a member of Company K, 1st Louisiana Volunteer Militia Regiment. After attaining admission to the bar, he joined his father's law practice in Baton Rouge in 1848. In 1853, he relocated his practice to New Orleans and continued there until the 1870s.

Morgan was a judge of the 2nd District Court of Louisiana from 1853 to 1857. During the American Civil War, Morgan remained loyal to the Union. After the war, President Andrew Johnson nominated him as the U.S. attorney in New Orleans. He served from 1866 to 1867, but left office after the United States Senate did not approve the nomination. The appointment was made again by Johnson's successor, Ulysses S. Grant. The Senate approved, and Morgan served from 1869 to 1870.

From 1873 to 1876, Morgan was an associate justice of the Louisiana Supreme Court. In 1876, he became judge of the International Tribunal in Alexandria, Egypt, an appointment that bridged the Grant and Rutherford B. Hayes administrations. President Hayes named him Minister to Mexico, a position that he held from January 26, 1880 to June 6, 1885.

After the assignment to Mexico, Morgan practiced law in New York City from 1885 to 1900. He died in New York City and was interred at Allegheny Cemetery in Pittsburgh, Pennsylvania.

== Family ==
In 1852, Morgan married Beatrice Ford (1826-1905), a native of Baton Rouge. They were the parents of nine children, five of whom survived to adulthood.

Morgan was the grandfather of Harry Hays Morgan Jr., great-grandfather of Gloria Vanderbilt and great-great-grandfather of Anderson Cooper. In addition, he was the grand-uncle of Cecil Morgan.

== Additional reading ==
- "Philip Hickey Morgan" (middle name misspelled), A Dictionary of Louisiana Biography, Vol. 1 (1988), p. 582
- "Philip Morgan," Dictionary of American Biography, XIII
- J.M. Callahan, American Foreign Policy in Mexican Relations (1932)

Political offices
| Preceded by John H. Kennard | Justice of the Louisiana Supreme Court; 1873–1877 | Succeeded by John E. Leonard |
Diplomatic posts
| Preceded by John W. Foster | U.S. Minister to Mexico; 1880–1885 | Succeeded by Henry R. Jackson |
