= Moses R. Hite =

American state legislator of Louisiana

Moses R. Hite was a state legislator in Louisiana. He represented Assumption Parish in the Louisiana House of Representatives in 1879 along with Charles Dupaty. He was a Republican. They defeated E. F. X. Dugas, a Democrat, and Walter Dickerson. Dupaty edited The Pioneer newspaper.

In 1877 he served on the police jury. In 1878 he was a candidate for sheriff.
