= William Gillespie Wyly =

American judge (1831–1903)

Zénon Labauve Jr.
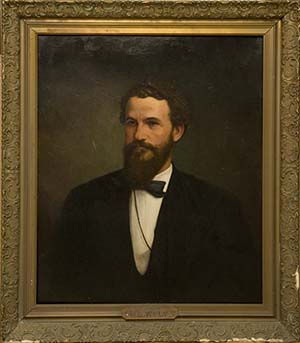

Justice of the Louisiana Supreme Court
- In office November 1, 1868 – November 3, 1876
- Preceded by: Zenon Labauve Jr.
- Succeeded by: John Edward King

Personal details
- Born: February, 1831 Greeneville, Tennessee
- Died: September 25, 1903 SS St. Louis

William Gillespie Wyly (February, 1831 – September 25, 1903) was a justice of the Louisiana Supreme Court from November 1, 1868, to November 3, 1876.

Born in Greeneville, Tennessee, Wyly graduated from Jefferson College. He was elected a District Judge in 1868, but "resigned shortly thereafter to become Supreme Court Justice". Wyly "owned one of the largest Cotton Plantations in Louisiana", and ran unsuccessfully for the United States Senate in 1877.

Wyly died on the S.S. St. Louis en route from Liverpool to New York City.

Political offices
Preceded by Zenon Labauve Jr.	Justice of the Louisiana Supreme Court; 1868–1876	Succeeded by John Edward King
