= Robert Reid (judge) =

American judge (1855–1923)

Justice of the Louisiana Supreme Court
- In office January 2, 1923 – January 14, 1923
- Preceded by: Newly configured court
- Succeeded by: Harney Felix Brunot

Personal details
- Born: Robert Raymond Reid; March 12, 1855; Madison County, Mississippi, U.S.
- Died: January 14, 1923 (aged 67); Amite City, Louisiana, U.S.
- Spouse: Katherine Buck
- Children: 11
- Education: Virginia Military Institute; University of Louisiana
- Profession: Lawyer, judge

Robert Raymond Reid (March 12, 1855 – January 14, 1923) was a justice of the Louisiana Supreme Court from January 2 to January 14, 1923.

== Early life, education, and career ==
Born in Madison County, Mississippi, Reid's family moved to Louisiana around 1860, when Reid's father purchase the Contreras plantation in St. Bernard Parish. The family settled in Amite, Louisiana, in 1866. Reid graduated from the Virginia Military Institute in 1875, and from the old University of Louisiana (later Tulane University), and was admitted to the bar in 1882, thereafter entering the private practice of law.

== Judicial service ==
In 1892, Reid was elected as a District Court Judge for Tangipahoa Parish, Louisiana, remaining in that office until 1904. During this twelve-year period, Reid was credited with "a virtual suppression of the lawlessness which afflicted portions of his district", with tensions rising to the point that "guards were utilized to prevent the threatened assassination of Reid by contending factions in the feuds that were going on during the period". In 1904, Reid returned to private practice. In 1921, Reid participated in the prosecution of the six men accused of the murder of Dallas Calmes. Reid was prominent in Masonic circles of the state, serving for two terms as Grand Master of the Grand Lodge Louisiana, from 1902 to 1904, and serving in other offices of the Grand Lodge. He was also a member of the constitutional convention of 1921, serving on various committees and as chairman of the bill of rights committee.

In 1922, Reid ran for an open seat on the Louisiana Supreme Court, handily defeating opponent Harney Felix Brunot in October of that year. Reid was sworn in on January 2, 1923, and served for only twelve days before his sudden death.

== Personal life and death ==
Reid married Katherine Buck of Tangipahoa Parish, with whom he had a large number of children, eleven of whom survived him.

Reid died at his home in Amite at the age of 68, from enlargement of the heart and hardening of the arteries. He was buried wearing his judicial robes. His eldest son, Columbus Reid, was proposed to succeed him on the bench, but judge Brunot was ultimately selected for the seat.

Political offices
Preceded by Newly reconfigured court	Justice of the Louisiana Supreme Court; 1923–1923	Succeeded by Harney Felix Brunot
