= Walter F. Marcus Jr. =

American judge (1927–2004)

Justice of the Louisiana Supreme Court
- In office 1973–2000
- Preceded by: Joe W. Sanders
- Succeeded by: Court restructured

Personal details
- Born: Walter Frederick Marcus Jr. July 26, 1927; New Orleans, Louisiana, U.S.
- Died: April 8, 2004 (aged 76); New Orleans, Louisiana, U.S.
- Cause of death: Pneumonia
- Spouse: Barbara Faye Cohn (m. 1952)
- Children: 3
- Education: Phillips Exeter Academy; Yale University; Tulane University Law School (LLB)
- Profession: Judge

Military service
- Allegiance: United States
- Battles/wars: World War II; Korean War

Walter Frederick Marcus Jr. (July 26, 1927 – April 8, 2004) was a justice of the Louisiana Supreme Court from 1973 to 2000.

== Early life, education, and career ==
Born in New Orleans, Marcus graduated from Phillips Exeter Academy, and he served in the United States military during World War II, as part of the occupation of Japan. He has received an undergraduate degree from Yale University and was then recalled for service in the Korean War, after which he received an LL.B. from Tulane University Law School in 1955.

== Political and judicial service ==
Marcus was elected to the New Orleans City Council in 1962, and was reelected in 1966, although he left the city council shortly into his second term after winning election as a district court judge, where he remained until his election to the state supreme court.

He was elected to the Louisiana Supreme Court in 1973, defeating Jim Garrison, among others, to win the seat. He was twice reelected, in 1980, and without opposition in 1990. He declined to run for a fourth term in 2000. As a justice, Marcus "won a reputation as a consensus builder", and saw a substantial proportion of his opinions become majority opinions of the court.

== Personal life and death ==
In 1952, Marcus married Barbara Faye Cohn of Fort Worth, Texas, with whom he had two sons and one daughter. He died of pneumonia at Touro Infirmary in New Orleans, at the age of 76.

Political offices
Preceded by Joe W. Sanders	Justice of the Louisiana Supreme Court; 1973–2000	Succeeded by Court restructured
