= Fred A. Blanche Jr. =

American judge (1921–1997)

Fred A. Blanche Jr. (January 18, 1921 – September 10, 1997) was a justice of the Louisiana Supreme Court from January 1, 1979, to May 16, 1986.

== Biography ==
Born in Baton Rouge, Louisiana, Blanche attended the University Laboratory High School of Baton Rouge and Louisiana State University. He served in the United States Army 88th Infantry Division during World War II, receiving a Bronze Star and the Purple Heart, and attaining the rank of Colonel in the Judge Advocate General's Corps. He was a judge of the Louisiana Nineteenth Judicial District Court from 1960 to 1969, and of the Louisiana First Circuit Court of Appeal from 1969 to 1978, before being elected to the Louisiana Supreme Court in 1978. After completing his judicial service, he was president of State National Life Insurance Company for a time.

== Death ==
Blanche died in Baton Rouge at the age of 76, and was interred there.

Political offices
Preceded by Frank Summers	Justice of the Louisiana Supreme Court; 1979–1986	Succeeded by Luther F. Cole
