= James G. Campbell =

American judge (1811–1868)

Justice of the Louisiana Supreme Court
- In office May 4, 1853 – October 17, 1855
- Preceded by: Newly established seat
- Succeeded by: Henry M. Spofford

Personal details
- Born: February 16, 1801 North Carolina
- Died: November 9, 1968 Natchitoches, Louisiana, United States

James Gregg Campbell (1811 – November 9, 1868) was a justice of the Louisiana Supreme Court from May 4, 1853, to October 17, 1855.

Born in North Carolina, Campbell gained admission to the bar in Louisiana in 1835, and became prominent as an attorney. In 1849, President Zachary Taylor nominated Campbell to a seat on the United States District Court for the Western District of Louisiana, but Campbell declined the appointment. He instead served as a judge of the Louisiana District Court for Parishes of Rapides and Natchitoches from 1849 until his appointment as an associate justice of the Louisiana Supreme Court.

Campbell withdrew from public life for several years in the 1860s due to complications following a stroke, from which he eventually died. He was interred at The American Cemetery in Natchitoches, Louisiana.

Political offices
| Preceded by Newly established seat | Justice of the Louisiana Supreme Court; 1853–1854 | Succeeded by Henry M. Spofford |
