= William Wirt Howe =

American judge (1833–1909)

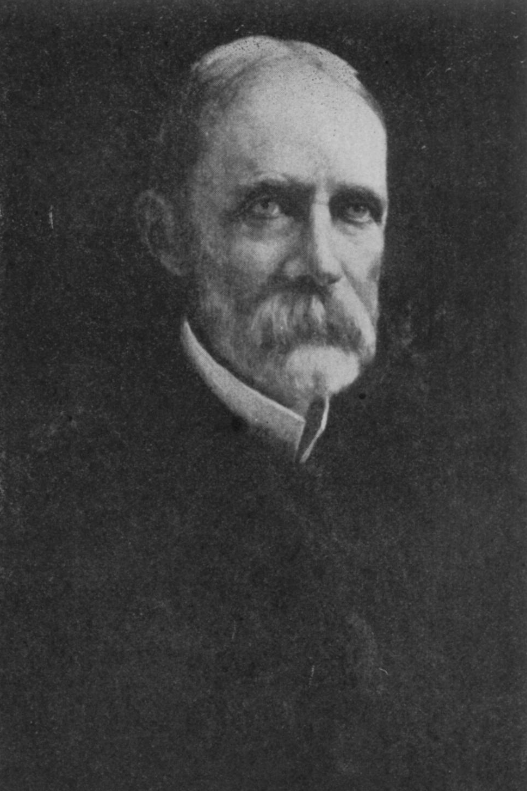
C. 1872 photograph of William Wirt Howe by Andres Molinary

William Wirt Howe (November 24, 1833 – March 17, 1909) was a justice of the Louisiana Supreme Court from November 1, 1868, to December 3, 1872.

Born in Canandaigua, New York, Howe graduated from Hamilton College and served as in the United States Army during the American Civil War, achieving the rank of major. He served for one year as president of the American Bar Association, and published a treatise, Studies in Civil Law. He was a judge of the Criminal District Court in 1868, which he resigned to become associate justice. He served as United States Attorney for the Eastern District of Louisiana from 1905 to 1909.

He died in New Orleans at the age of 75.

Political offices
Preceded by John Henry Ilsley	Justice of the Louisiana Supreme Court; 1868–1872	Succeeded by John H. Kennard
