= Robert Byron Jones =

American judge (1833–1867)

Justice of the Louisiana Supreme Court
- In office April 1, 1865 – July 1, 1866
- Preceded by: Newly established court
- Succeeded by: James G. Taliaferro

Member of the Louisiana State Legislature
- In office 1864–1865

Personal details
- Born: 1833 Florida, U.S.
- Died: July 20, 1867 (aged 33–34) New Orleans, Louisiana, U.S.
- Occupation: Judge

Robert Byron Jones (1833 – July 20, 1867) was a justice of the Louisiana Supreme Court from April 1, 1865, to July 1, 1866.

Born in Florida in 1833, Jones served in the Louisiana State Legislature from 1864 to 1865, and was chairman of the Judiciary Committee. In 1867, Jones was arrested in Natchitoches, Louisiana, on a charge of having been implicated in the murder of one Cyrus W. Stauffer. While confined in the military prison in the city, he fell ill with cholera, and was released. He died a few hours later, in New Orleans. Jones had a brother who was a doctor who also died of cholera only a few days earlier.

Political offices
Preceded by Newly established court	Justice of the Louisiana Supreme Court; 1865–1866	Succeeded by James G. Taliaferro
