= John T. Ludeling =

American judge (1827–1891)

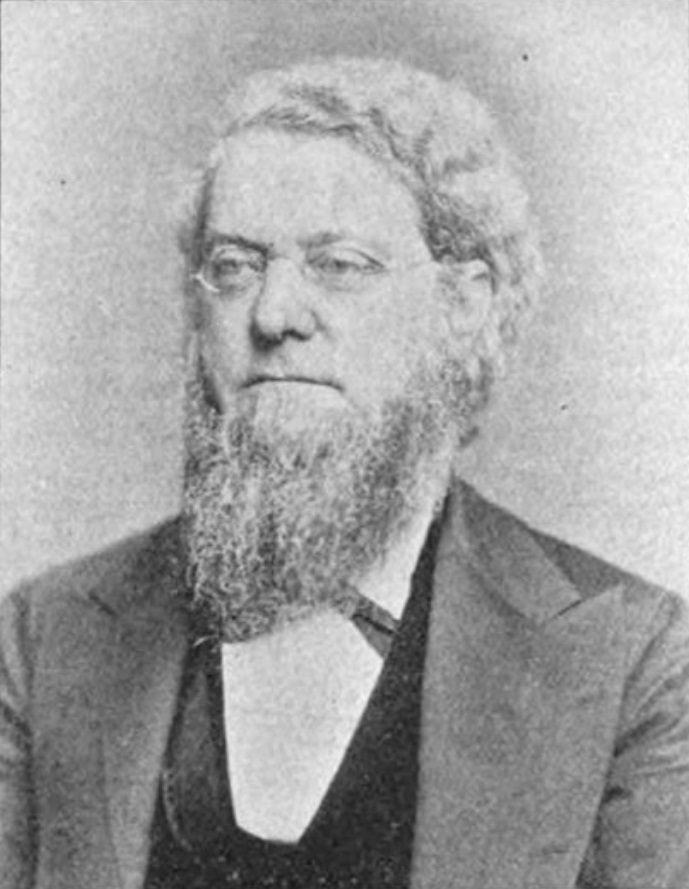
John T. Ludeling

John Theodore Ludeling (January 17, 1827 – January 27, 1891) was chief justice of the Louisiana Supreme Court from November 1, 1868 to January 9, 1877.

== Early life, education, and career ==
Born in Monroe, Louisiana, Ludeling entered Saint Louis University at the age of 12, but did receive a degree. He read law in Monroe to gain admission to the bar in Louisiana. He was a lifelong Republican, opposing secession at the outset of the American Civil War, and refusing to take up arms against either side. His principled neutrality won him political support, and after the war he was called to serve in the 1867 Constitutional Convention.

== Judicial service and later life ==
In 1868, Governor Henry C. Warmoth appointed Ludeling Chief Justice of the state supreme court, making him the fifth person to hold that office, but the first Louisiana native to do so. Ludeling served until 1877, when Governor Francis T. Nicholls appointed an entirely new court.

Ludeling thereafter attained great wealth as president of Vicksburg, Shreveport and Pacific Railway.

== Personal life and death ==
In 1855, Ludeling married Maria Copley Larkin, with whom he had four children. Later in life, he retired to a plantation home near Monroe called Killeden Plantation. He died there at the age of 68, following a period of heart disease.

Political offices
Preceded by William B. Hyman	Justice of the Louisiana Supreme Court; 1868–1877	Succeeded by Thomas Courtland Manning
