= Amos Lee Ponder =

American judge (1887–1959)

Amos Lee Ponder Jr. (March 26, 1887 – October 19, 1959) was a justice of the Louisiana Supreme Court from January 4, 1937, to October 19, 1959.

Born at Fort Jesup in Louisiana, Ponder attended Mt. Lebanon College and Tulane University, and graduated as president of his class at Louisiana State University in 1912. Ponder was a Louisiana district attorney until 1930, and then a district judge from 1930 to 1937, when he was elected to the state supreme court. He was reelected in 1950.

Ponder died at Baptist Hospital in New Orleans, following a bout with pneumonia.

Political offices
Preceded by Harney Felix Brunot	Justice of the Louisiana Supreme Court; 1937–1959	Succeeded by Rene A. Viosca
