= Frederick M. Odom =

American judge (c. 1871–1960)

Frederick Marion Odom (c. 1871 – August 21, 1960) was a justice of the Louisiana Supreme Court from January 1, 1931, to December 20, 1945.

Born in Natchitoches Parish, Louisiana, Odom graduated from the State Normal School there in 1894, Odom served as District Attorney in Shreveport from 1908 to 1918, when Governor Ruffin G. Pleasant elevated judge Benjamin C. Dawkins of the Louisiana Sixth District Court to the state supreme court. Odom resigned his position to run for the seat, serving there from 1918 to 1924, and then as a judge of the Louisiana Second Circuit Court of Appeals. In 1930, he was elected to the Louisiana Supreme Court, serving until his retirement on January 1, 1945.

Odom died in a nursing home from a heart attack at the age of 89.

Political offices
Preceded by David N. Thompson	Justice of the Louisiana Supreme Court; 1931–1945	Succeeded by Frank W. Hawthorne
