= Frank A. Monroe =

American judge (1844–1927)

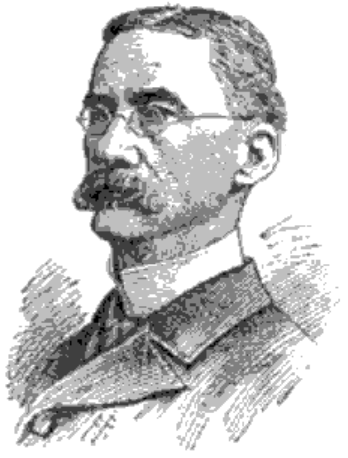

Justice of the Louisiana Supreme Court
- In office March 22, 1899 – January 2, 1922

Personal details
- Born: Frank Adair Monroe; August 30, 1844 Annapolis, Maryland
- Died: January 16, 1927 (aged 82) New Orleans, Louisiana
- Spouse: Alice Blanc (m. 1878)
- Children: 10
- Relatives: Thomas Bell Monroe (grandfather)
- Education: Kentucky Military Institute
- Occupation: Jurist
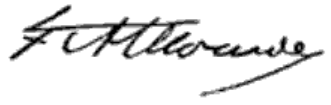
- Signature

Frank Adair Monroe (August 30, 1844 – January 16, 1927) was a justice of the Louisiana Supreme Court from March 22, 1899, to January 2, 1922, serving as chief justice from April 5, 1914, on.

== Biography ==
Born in Annapolis, Maryland, Monroe's grandfather was Thomas Bell Monroe, a judge of the United States District Court for the District of Kentucky. Monroe was raised in Frankfort, Kentucky, and was enrolled as a cadet at the Kentucky Military Institute at the beginning of the American Civil War. He served in the Confederate Army during the war, where he was wounded in 1863, and was captured and held by Union forces for eight months.

He served for one month as Judge of Third District Court in 1872, when he was dispossessed. He was in the White League. He was re-elected as a judge in 1876, and was a judge of the Civil District Court from 1880 to 1899. He was a member Constitutional Convention of 1898. He succeeded Judge Breaux as Chief Justice through seniority in April 1914. He retired from the court in 1921.

== Personal life and death ==
He married Alice Blane in 1878, and they had ten children.

Frank A. Monroe died in New Orleans on January 16, 1927.

Political offices
Preceded by Henry C. Miller	Justice of the Louisiana Supreme Court; 1899–1922	Succeeded by Joshua G. Baker
