= E. Howard McCaleb =

American judge (1897–1978)

E. Howard McCaleb (December 25, 1897 – October 30, 1978) was an American judge. He was a justice of the Louisiana Supreme Court from May 1941 to January 1943, and again from 1947 to 1972, serving as chief justice from 1971 to 1972.

== Early life, education, and military service ==
Born in New Orleans "into a family prominent in the legal profession", McCaleb attended the public schools of his native city, as well as Ferrell's School for Boys and Staunton Military Academy in Virginia. After attended Tulane University for a year, he entered Washington and Lee University in Lexington, Virginia in 1915. His studies were interrupted by service in World War I, after which he received an LL.B. from Washington and Lee in 1919, and gained admission to the bar in Louisiana in 1920.

== Legal career ==
He practiced law in his father's firm from 1920 to 1924, and was than an assistant United States Attorney for the Eastern District of Louisiana from 1924 to 1925. He returned to private practice until his election to the Court of Appeal in 1936. He temporarily served on the Supreme Court from May 8, 1941, to January 1, 1943, filling the unexpired term of John R. Land, who had died. McCaleb was elected without opposition to a full term on the court in his own right in 1946, and subsequently ran unopposed for reelection in 1960. As a justice, McCaleb "criticized judges whose decisions are influenced by their own emotions or prejudices", and during his brief tenure as Chief Justice he "dramatically reduced delay in [the] criminal appeals docket".

== Personal life and death ==
In 1920, McCaleb married Louise Wright, with whom he had two children.

McCaleb died in a hospital in New Orleans at the age of 81.

Political offices
Preceded by Joe B. Hamiter	Chief Justice of the Louisiana Supreme Court; 1971–1972	Succeeded by Walter B. Hamlin
Preceded by John R. Land; Robert F. Kennon	Justice of the Louisiana Supreme Court; 1941–1943; 1947–1970	Succeeded by Joe B. Hamiter; John A. Dixon Jr.
