= Henry R. Jackson =

American diplomat (1820–1898)

Henry Rootes Jackson
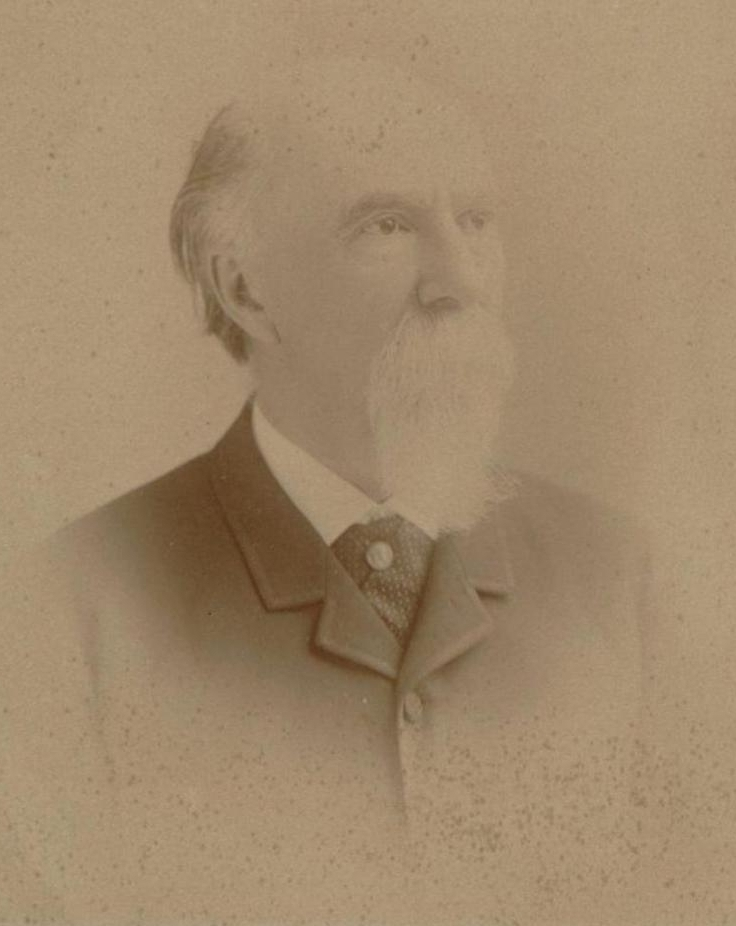

3rd United States Minister to the Austrian Empire
- In office September 28, 1854 – June 1, 1858
- Preceded by: Daniel Jenifer
- Succeeded by: J. Glancy Jones

20th United States Minister to Mexico
- In office 1885–1886
- Preceded by: Philip H. Morgan
- Succeeded by: Thomas Courtland Manning

Personal details
- Born: June 24, 1820 Athens, Georgia, US
- Died: May 23, 1898 (aged 77) Savannah, Georgia, US
- Resting place: Bonaventure Cemetery, Savannah, Georgia
- Education: Yale University

Military service
- Allegiance: United States of America; Confederate States of America
- Branch/service: United States Army; Confederate States Army
- Years of service: 1846–1847; 1861–1865
- Rank: Colonel (USA); Brigadier General (CSA); Major General (Georgia Militia)
- Battles/wars: Mexican–American War; American Civil War Battle of Cheat Mountain Atlanta campaign Franklin–Nashville Campaign Battle of Nashville

Henry Rootes Jackson (June 24, 1820 – May 23, 1898) was an American lawyer, politician and military officer. He notably served as a major general in the Confederate States Army during the American Civil War.

== Biography ==
Jackson was born in Athens, Georgia. In 1839 he graduated with honors from Yale University, where he was a member of Skull and Bones. He was admitted to the Georgia bar in 1840 and served as lawyer and district attorney. During the Mexican-American War he served in the United States Volunteers, initially being Captain of a volunteer company from Savannah, the Irish Jasper Greens, becoming Colonel of the 1st Georgia Volunteer Regiment when it was organized from his and other companies. The unit was raised in June 1846 for a year, serving in rear areas in Mexico without seeing combat, however suffering heavy losses from sickness and climate. It was mustered out in June 1847. After the war he became co-owner and editor of the newspaper The Savannah Georgian. He then became a state judge, was named United States Chargé d'affaires to the Austrian Empire from 1853 to 1854 and then Minister Resident to the Austrian Empire from 1854 to 1858. Jackson was also a poet (his book Tallulah and Other Poems appeared in 1850) and a frequent public speaker. For instance, he delivered an oration on "Courage" to the University of Georgia literary societies in 1848 and a dedication address for the Laurel Grove Cemetery in Savannah in 1852. Jackson was a prominent lawyer and prosecutor in Savannah. In 1859, he unsuccessfully prosecuted the owners and crew of a slave ship, the Wanderer, the second-to-last ship known to have brought people from Africa into the United States for sale as slaves.

When the American Civil War began he served as a judge in Confederate courts before joining the Confederate States Army as an aide to Governor Joseph E. Brown. In June he was named brigadier general; leading troops during the Western Virginia campaign. There he saw action at the Battle of Cheat Mountain and later briefly led the Confederate Army of the Northwest. In December he resigned his Confederate commission and was named major general in the state militia of Georgia. He returned to Confederate service in September 1863; in 1864 both heading the Military District of Georgia and serving in the Army of Tennessee. He led a brigade during the later part of the Atlanta campaign, acting as division commander on several occasions. He then got a brigade in William B. Bate's division for the Franklin-Nashville Campaign. Jackson was captured at the Battle of Nashville and was paroled from Fort Warren, Massachusetts, on July 8, 1865.

After the war, he resumed his law practice and political career, being named as minister to Mexico from 1885 to 1886. He also was a railroad executive, banker, and president of the Georgia Historical Society (1875 – 1898). Jackson died in Savannah, Georgia, and was buried in Bonaventure Cemetery, owned by City of Savannah, located in Thunderbolt, Ga.

== See also ==
- List of American Civil War generals (Confederate)

== Notes ==
Diplomatic posts
Preceded by Thomas M. Foote	U.S. Minister to the Austrian Empire; 1853–1858	Succeeded by J. Glancy Jones
Preceded by Philip H. Morgan	U.S. Minister to Mexico; 1885–1886	Succeeded by Thomas C. Manning
