= Frank W. Hawthorne =

American judge (1900–1986)

Justice of the Louisiana Supreme Court
- In office January 1, 1945 – January 2, 1968
- Preceded by: Frederick M. Odom
- Succeeded by: Mack E. Barham

Personal details
- Born: Francis Willard Hawthorne; June 2, 1900
- Died: March 2, 1986 (aged 85)
- Education: Louisiana State University Law Center
- Profession: Judge

Francis Willard "Frank" Hawthorne (June 2, 1900 – March 2, 1986) was a justice of the Louisiana Supreme Court from January 1, 1945, to January 2, 1968.

Hawthorne received his law degree from Louisiana State University, and was a Louisiana District Attorney and a judge of the state's Fourth Judicial Circuit before defeating two other candidates to secure his election to an open seat on the supreme court in 1944. Hawthorne remained active in his retirement, appearing before the Louisiana Constitutional Convention's Judiciary Committee in 1973 to urge "a constitutional prohibition against pardons for capitol punishment".

Political offices
Preceded by Frederick M. Odom	Justice of the Louisiana Supreme Court; 1945–1968	Succeeded by Mack E. Barham
