= Judge Simon =

Judge Simon may refer to:

- Michael H. Simon (born 1956), judge of the United States District Court for the District of Oregon
- Philip P. Simon (born 1962), judge of the United States District Court for the Northern District of Indiana

== See also ==
- Justice Simon (disambiguation)
