= Sam A. LeBlanc III =

American judge

Samuel Albert LeBlanc III

Louisiana State Representative for District 86 (Jefferson and Orleans parishes)
- In office 1972–1980
- Preceded by: Former at-large House seat
- Succeeded by: Terry W. Gee

Personal details
- Born: November 12, 1938 (age 87)
- Party: Democratic
- Spouse: Noelle Engler LeBlanc (m. 1961)
- Relations: Samuel A. LeBlanc I (grandfather) Rob Couhig (half-brother) Kevin Couhig (half-brother) George W. Reese Jr. (uncle)
- Children: Including: Sam A. LeBlanc IV Nine grandchildren
- Parent(s): Samuel A. LeBlanc II Marcelle "Nootsie" Reese LeBlanc Couhig Stepfather Robert E. Couhig Sr.
- Education: Georgetown University Tulane University Law School West Feliciana Parish, Louisiana Formerly New Orleans
- Occupation: Lawyer

Samuel Albert LeBlanc III (born November 12, 1938), is a Louisiana attorney who served as a Democrat in the Louisiana House of Representatives from 1972 to 1980.

On December 28, 1961, LeBlanc married Noelle Engler in Corpus Christi, Texas.

Louisiana House of Representatives
Preceded by At-large delegation	Louisiana State Representative for District 86 (Jefferson and Orleans parishes); 1972–1980	Succeeded by Terry W. Gee
