= Wynne Grey Rogers =

American judge (1874–1946)

Wynne Grey Rogers (December 26, 1874 – September 15, 1946) was a justice of the Louisiana Supreme Court from November 27, 1922, to September 15, 1946.

Born in New Orleans, Louisiana, to judge and state legislator Owen Wynne Rogers, whose brother was Louisiana Attorney General Walter Henry Rogers, Rogers graduated from Tulane University Law School in 1985. Rogers was a district judge for two years prior to his election to the state supreme court. He had earlier been a partner in the Tiche & Rogers law firm.

Rogers taught in Tulane University's College of Law. During World War I, Rogers was a member of Louisiana's branch of the Four Minute Men.

On September 15, 1946, Rogers died in Baptist Hospital in New Orleans from a heart ailment, at the age of 71.

Political offices
Preceded by Court reconfigured	Justice of the Louisiana Supreme Court; 1922–1946	Succeeded by Nathaniel W. Bond
