= John H. Kennard =

American judge

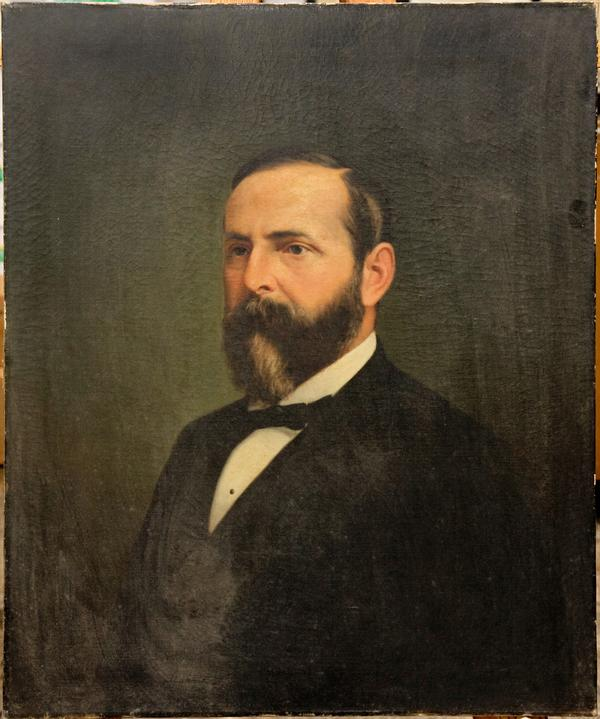
Judge John Hanson Kennard

John Hanson Kennard (1836 – May 2, 1887) was Judge of the Louisiana Supreme Court from December 3, 1872, to February 1, 1873. He also became President of the Board of Directors of the University of Louisiana.

== Early life, education, and career ==
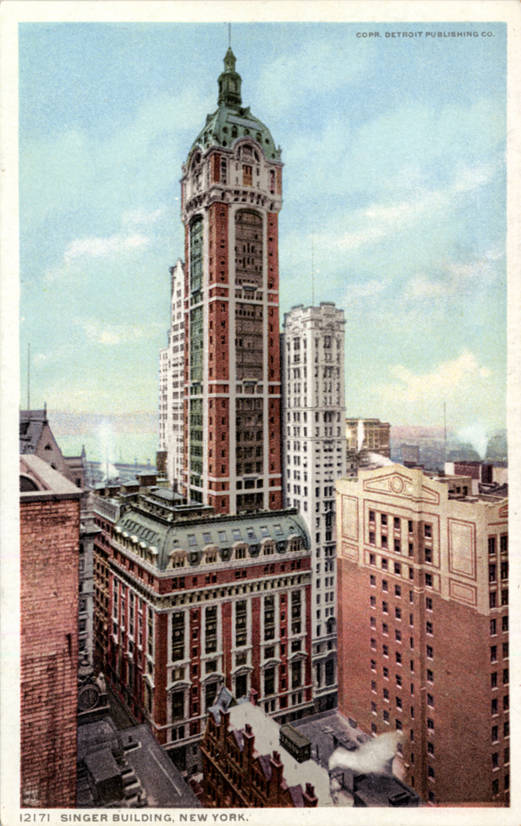
Singer Building, New York, residence of Judge Kennard

Born in Kent County, Maryland, he graduated from the University of Virginia in 1855, and from the Law Department of the University of Louisiana (now Tulane University) in 1857. He served in the Confederate Army during the American Civil War, in Fenner's Battery and the Louisiana Artillery, and resumed the practice of law in New Orleans in 1865. He also had an interest in a large-scale cotton planting operation.

Judge John Hanson Kennard was also a lineal descendant of Capt. James Jack who brought the Mecklenburg Declaration of Independence, and founding father John Hanson, who acted as the 1st President of the Confederation Congress.

== Judicial service and later life ==
In November 1872, Governor Henry C. Warmoth appointed Kennard to a seat as an associate justice of the Supreme Court of Louisiana, and Kennard "filled the place with assiduity and distinction for about three months," after which he "was displaced by an adverse decision as to the title of his office arising from the political complications of that period". Kennard sued for his right to hold the office, "ending at the U.S. Supreme Court where he lost to [Louisiana] Supreme Court Associate Justice Philip H. Morgan", who then assumed the office.

Kennard then returned to practice as a member of the law firm of Kennard, Howe & Prentiss, and was prominent in the Chamber of Commerce and in political matters. He served for a time as President of the Board of Directors of the University of Louisiana.

A few days before his death, he presided over a meeting of the alumni of his alma mater marking the birthday of Thomas Jefferson, and seemed to be in good health. However, "the exertion of the occasion seemed to annoy and worry him in such a manner as to excite some apprehension among his more intimate friends". On the evening of his death, in New Orleans, "paralysis of the brain manifested itself", and he died about an hour later.

== Personal life ==
Kennard was married twice. His first wife was Helen Wakefield Yale, a member of the Yale family, and granddaughter of Rev. Cyrus Yale and a noted Judge McGee of Wilkinson County, Mississippi. His second wife survived him, as did two sons and two daughters. Kennard was interred at Metairie Cemetery. He was a member of The Boston Club.

His children were Elizabeth, Mary Helen, Richard Yale and James Wakefield. Helen Wakefield Yale's uncles were Congressman James Wakefield, who also became Senator and 8th Lieutenant Governor of Minnesota, and Yale University Doctor John L. Wakefield, husband of Sarah F. Wakefield. Her aunt, Lucy Clarissa Wakefield, married to the son of Congressman Lancelot Phelps, and brother of Congressman James Phelps, whose father-in-law, Samuel Ingham, was also Congressman and Senator.

Judge Kennard lived at 149 Broadway in New York, in the Singer Building, and was a member of the Lotos Club.

Political offices
Preceded by William Wirt Howe	Justice of the Louisiana Supreme Court; 1872–1873	Succeeded by Philip H. Morgan
