= Caroline Elizabeth Merrick =

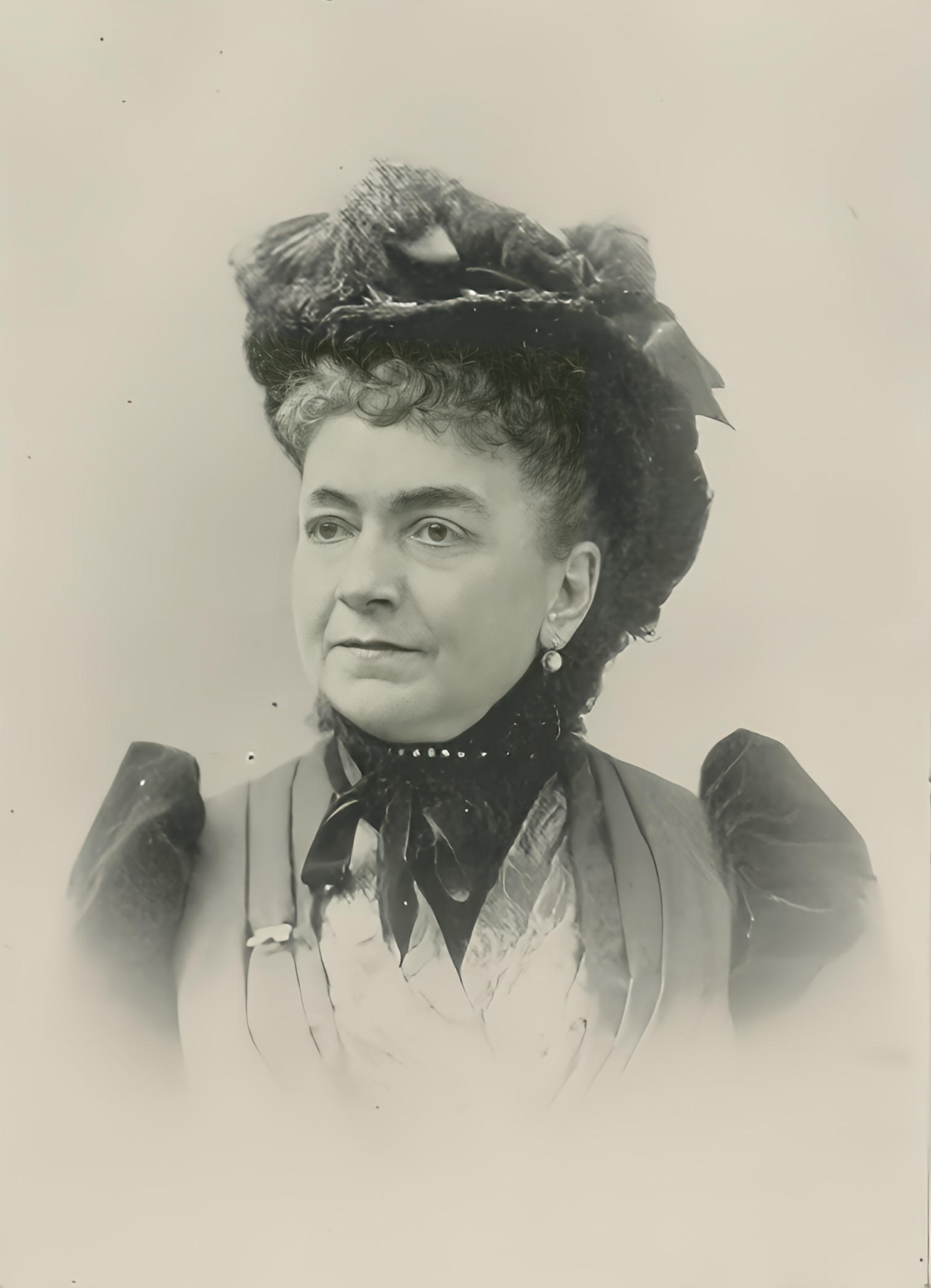
Caroline Elizabeth Merrick, "A Woman of the Century"

Caroline Elizabeth Merrick (November 24, 1825 – March 29, 1908) was an American writer and temperance worker. She is the author of Old Times in Dixie Land: a Southern Matron's Memories (1901). Taking an active part in the charitable and philanthropic movements of New Orleans, she served as president of the Ladies' Sanitary and Benevolent Association, of the Woman's Foreign Missionary Society of the Methodist Episcopal Church, and of the Woman's League of Louisiana.

== Early life and education ==
Caroline Elizabeth Thomas was born on Cottage Hall Plantation, East Feliciana Parish, Louisiana, on November 24, 1825. Her father was Capt. David Thomas (1777-1849), who belonged to a prominent South Carolina family. A veteran of the Battle of New Orleans, David Thomas was a trustee of the college which later became the Centenary College of Louisiana. Her mother was Elizabeth Patillo, who died in 1833.

She was educated by governesses at home.

== Career ==
Merrick devoted the first 20 years of her married life to raising a family. At that time, the temperance cause was being widely agitated in the South, and some women favored the movement. She became at once president of a local union, and filled the position of State president for Louisiana. She wrote extensively on the subject, but her chief talent was in impromptu speaking. She was a very successful platform orator, holding an audience by the force of her wit and keen sarcasm. Merrick was described by Frances Willard, president of the WCTU from 1879–1898, as a "That is the lady who can make the W.C.T.U. a success, even in the volatile city of the Mardi Gras".

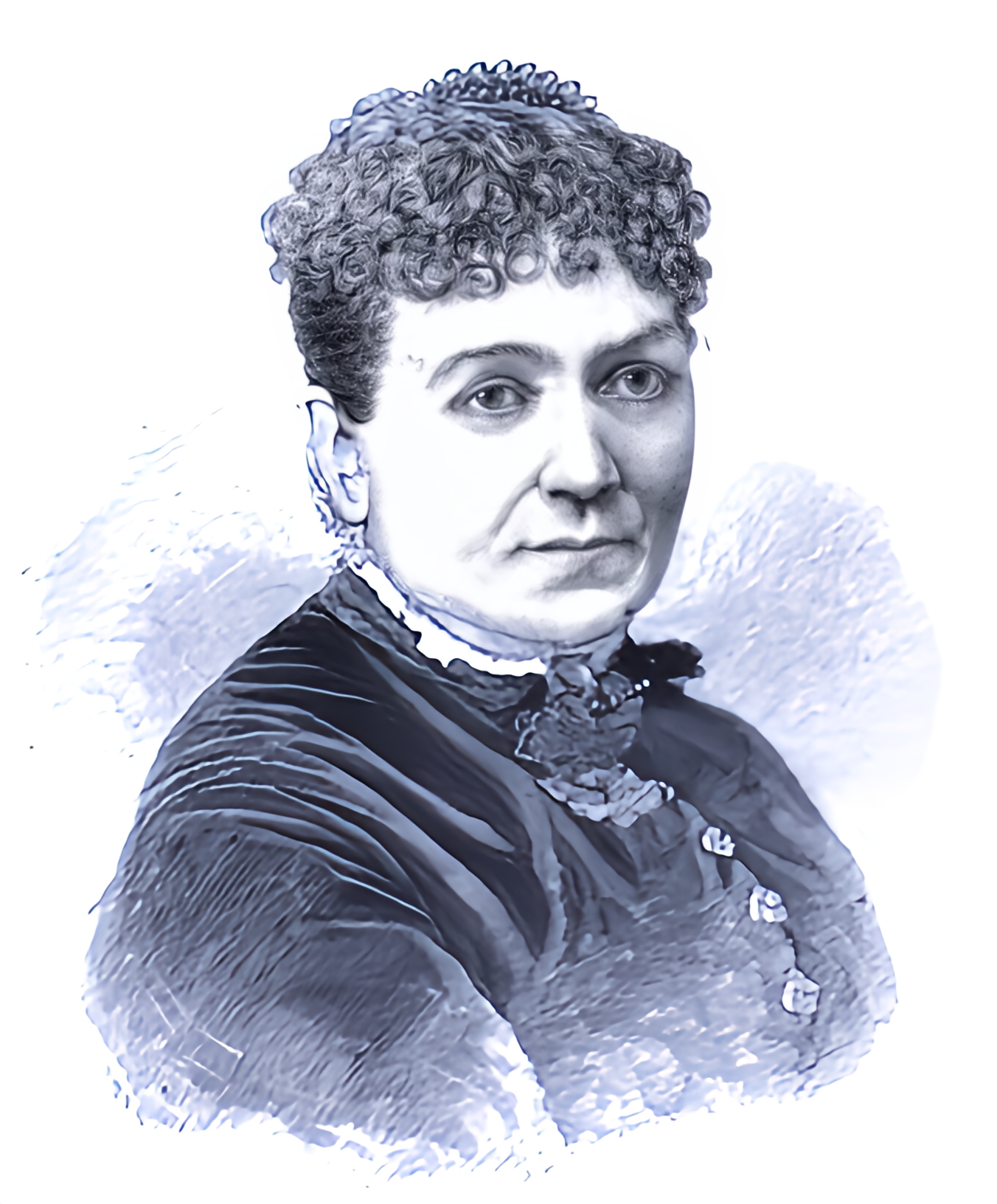
Caroline Elizabeth Merrick (c. 1888)

She favored woman suffrage, and for years, she stood comparatively alone in her ardent championship of the cause. She was the first woman of Louisiana to speak publicly in behalf of women. She addressed the State convention in 1879, and assisted to secure an article in the Constitution making all women over 21 years of age eligible to hold office in connection with the public schools. It required considerable moral courage to side with a movement so cruelly derided in the South, but, supported by her husband, she always worked for the emancipation of women through her writing, defining the legal status of woman in Louisiana. She was a valued correspondent of several leading woman's journals. In 1888, she represented Louisiana in the Woman's International Council in Washington D.C., and also in the Woman's Suffrage Association, which immediately afterward held a convention in the same city.

She took an active part in the charitable and philanthropic movements of New Orleans. For 12 years, she was secretary of St. Anna's Asylum for Aged and Destitute Women and Children. She was the president of the Ladies' Sanitary and Benevolent Association, president of the Woman's Foreign Missionary Society of the Methodist Episcopal Church, and she was unanimously elected president of the Woman's League of Louisiana.

She published a series of stories and sketches of Afro Americans of the South, which were widely copied. She wrote some poems that showed a good degree of poetic feeling and talent. She was the author of Old Times in Dixie Land: a Southern Matron's Memories, New York: Grafton Press, 1901.

== Personal life ==
At the age of 15, she married Edwin Thomas Merrick (1808-1897), a 37 year old jurist, who served as chief justice of the Supreme Court of Louisiana for ten years before the American Civil War, and was reelected under the Confederacy. Their family consisted of two sons and two daughters.

Merrick died at her home in New Orleans on March 29, 1908.
