= Zenon Labauve Jr. =

American judge (1801–1870)

Zénon Labauve Jr.
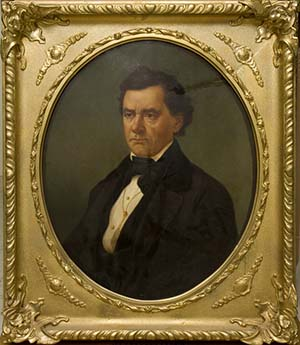

Justice of the Louisiana Supreme Court
- In office April 3, 1865 – November 1, 1868
- Preceded by: Thomas Thompson Land
- Succeeded by: William Gillespie Wyly

Personal details
- Born: February 16, 1801 West Florida, Spanish Empire
- Died: September 25, 1870 (aged 69) Iberville, Louisiana, United States

Zénon Labauve Jr. (February 16, 1801 – September 25, 1870) was a Reconstruction-era justice of the Louisiana Supreme Court and the first Creole to serve on the court.

Labauve was born in 1801 in a portion of West Florida that would later become West Baton Rouge Parish, Louisiana. His father, Pierre Labauve, was a Louisiana Creole born in St. James Parish and his mother was a native of France. He first won election to the Louisiana State Senate in 1834, but was defeated for reelection in 1838. In 1838, he was elected the first mayor of the newly incorporated Plaquemine. In July 1842 he was again elected to the state Senate as a Whig, but the election results were cancelled. When the election was re-run in 1843, he was again successful. In 1844, he was elected to the state's Constitutional Convention of 1845. In a brief biographical sketch of Constitutional Convention delegates, The Times-Picayune newspaper noted "His speeches are generally brief, but give evidence of a sound thinker." Despite desiring to retire from the state Senate, he was nominated once more and in 1851 reelected without opposition.

After the Civil War, Labauve was appointed by the Reconstruction-era governor Michael Hahn to an associate justice seat on the Louisiana Supreme Court. Labauve served from April 3, 1865, to November 1, 1868. Prior to his appointment, Labauve had grown wealthy as a sugar planter and lawyer in the German Coast. He and his fellow appointees were considered "safe" and "loyal" and in alignment with the Federal government. Labauve was the "[f]irst member of 'ancienne population'," meaning he was descended from a Creole family that was in Louisiana prior to the Sale of Louisiana, to serve on the Louisiana Supreme Court.

He died in 1870 in Iberville Parish.

Political offices
Preceded by Thomas Thompson Land	Justice of the Louisiana Supreme Court; 1865–1868	Succeeded by William Gillespie Wyly
