= George Strawbridge =

American judge (1785–1859)

George Strawbridge (1785 – March 11, 1859) was a justice of the Louisiana Supreme Court from August 3, 1839, to December 1, 1839.

Born in Maryland, Strawbridge was a prominent shipping merchant. He served on the Louisiana Supreme Court for less than five months in 1839. Some years after he retired from the supreme court bench, he became judge of the Fourth District Court, serving from 1846 to 1853. He ran for Associate Justice in 1853, but was defeated for election.

Political offices
Preceded by George Eustis	Justice of the Louisiana Supreme Court; 1839–1839	Succeeded by Court reconfigured
