= Paul Leche =

American judge (1857–1938)

Paul Leche (July 19, 1857 – August 28, 1938) was a justice of the Louisiana Supreme Court from 1917 to 1919, and again from 1923 to 1925, the first time by appointment to fill the unexpired term of another justice, and the second time in a temporary seat to address an excessive case load.

== Early life, education, and career ==
Born in Assumption Parish, Louisiana to J. B. and Rose Emma (Bourg) Leche.

Leche graduated from Spring Hill College, near Mobile, Alabama, in 1877. After educating himself in law, he passed an examination before the state supreme court, and was admitted to the bar in May, 1879.

Leche was for Mayor of Donaldsonville, Louisiana from 1894 to 1899, and was also Superintendent of schools of Ascension Parish from 1888 to 1898.

== Judicial service ==
When Walter Guion left the Assumption-Ascension-St. James district bench in 1900 to become attorney general, Leche was elected as his successor. Leche served as district judge for twelve years, until 1912, when he was elected to the court of appeals to succeed L. P. Caillouet of Thibodaux.

In June 1917, Leche was appointed to the Louisiana Supreme Court as the interim successor of the late Justice Alfred D. Land, whose unexpired term had approximately eighteen months remaining until a new justice to be elected in November 1918 would take the seat in December. Leche then returned to the circuit court until October 1, 1923, when he was again temporarily appointed to the supreme court, alongside David N. Thompson, this time to two additional seats created for the purpose of assisting in clearing the docket of some 500 pending cases. Leche returned from this assignment to the circuit court in 1925, where he remained until his retirement in 1930.

== Personal life and death ==
On February 4, 1880, he married Louise Willoz, daughter of Henry and Alice (Skates) Willoz, of New Orleans. They had one son, Carl. He was a member of the Roman Catholic church and was a state deputy Supreme Knight in the Knights of Columbus.

He died at the home of his son Karl, in Baton Rouge, at the age of 81.

Political offices
Preceded by Alfred D. Land; Newly created seat	Justice of the Louisiana Supreme Court; 1917–1919; 1923–1925	Succeeded by Court restructured Seat expired
