= Rene A. Viosca =

American judge (1890–1973)

Justice of the Louisiana Supreme Court
- In office 1959–1960
- Preceded by: Amos Lee Ponder
- Succeeded by: Frank Summers

Personal details
- Born: November 14, 1890
- Died: September 16, 1973 (aged 82)
- Profession: Judge

Rene A. Viosca (November 14, 1890 – September 16, 1973) was a justice of the Louisiana Supreme Court from 1959 to 1960.

As a state court judge, in 1957, Viosca ruled in favor of boxer Ralph Dupas in a suit to establish Dupas' race, with Dupas contending that he was white, and therefore permitted to box white opponents in then-segregated Louisiana.

Viosca ran for the Louisiana Supreme Court unsuccessfully, but was temporarily appointed to the court following the sudden death of Justice Amos Lee Ponder.

Political offices
Preceded by Amos Lee Ponder	Justice of the Louisiana Supreme Court; 1959–1960	Succeeded by Frank Summers
