= Alexander McKenzie Buchanan =

American judge (1805–1868)

Justice of the Louisiana Supreme Court
- In office May 4, 1853 – May 6, 1862

Personal details
- Born: March 1, 1805; New York City, U.S.
- Died: August 26, 1868 (aged 63)
- Occupation: Lawyer, judge

Alexander McKenzie Buchanan (March 1, 1805 – August 26, 1868) was a justice of the Louisiana Supreme Court from May 4, 1853, to May 6, 1862.

Born in New York City, Buchanan read law in the office of Louisiana Supreme Court Justice Isaac Trimble Preston, gaining admission to the bar in 1826. Buchanan was a judge of the Fourth District Court before his ascension to the supreme court bench. He later served as the city attorney for New Orleans from 1867 to 1868.

Political offices
Preceded by Pierre Adolphe Rost	Justice of the Louisiana Supreme Court; 1853–1862	Succeeded by Pierre Emile Bonford
