= John Edward King (Louisiana judge) =

American judge (1821–1881)

Justice of the Louisiana Supreme Court
- In office January 9, 1877
- Preceded by: William Gillespie Wyly
- Succeeded by: William B. Giles Egan

Speaker of the Louisiana House of Representatives
- In office 1852
- Preceded by: Edwin Warren Moïse
- Succeeded by: Edwin Warren Moïse

Personal details
- Born: 1821 Louisiana, U.S.
- Died: December 6, 1881 (aged 59–60) Opelousas, Louisiana, U.S.
- Party: Whig
- Occupation: Judge

Military service
- Allegiance: Confederate States of America
- Branch/service: Confederate States Army
- Rank: Lieutenant colonel
- Battles/wars: American Civil War

John Edward King (1821 – December 6, 1881) was a justice of the Louisiana Supreme Court for one day, January 9, 1877.

King was a member of Louisiana Constitutional Convention of 1852, Speaker of the Louisiana House of Representatives in 1852, and a state district judge in Opelousas, Louisiana, in 1870. He was appointed to the state supreme court by Governor Stephen B. Packard to succeed Judge William Gillespie Wyly; the court was turned out of office by the Democrats on the same day that it convened. The seat was later filled by Governor Francis T. Nicholls, who appointed William B. Giles Egan.

King died in Opelousas.

Political offices
Preceded by William Gillespie Wyly	Justice of the Louisiana Supreme Court; 1877–1877	Succeeded by William B. Giles Egan
