= Albert Duffel =

American judge (1813–1862)

Albert Duffel (February 7, 1813 – September 22, 1862) was a justice of the Louisiana Supreme Court from March 12, 1860, to April, 1862.

Born in Ascension Parish, Louisiana, Duffel gained admission to the bar in 1836.

Political offices
Preceded by James L. Cole	Justice of the Louisiana Supreme Court; 1860–1862	Succeeded by Court reorganized due to war
