= Joshua G. Baker =

American judge (1852–1935)

Joshua Gabriel Baker (1852 – March 24, 1935) was a justice of the Louisiana Supreme Court from October 15, 1921, to November 27, 1922.

Born in St. Mary Parish, Louisiana, he was "educated at home and then in Virginia". He was licensed to practice law in 1874, and became an assistant district attorney for Orleans Parish in 1877. In 1883, he became a judge of the criminal court for that parish, holding that office until 1892, and then again from 1896 to 1920. In August 1921, he won election to a seat on the supreme court vacated by the retirement of Justice Frank A. Monroe.

Baker died in New Orleans at the age of 83.

Political offices
Preceded by Frank A. Monroe	Justice of the Louisiana Supreme Court; 1921–1922	Succeeded by Court reconfigured
