= Harney Felix Brunot =

American judge (1860–1944)

Justice of the Louisiana Supreme Court
- In office June 4, 1923 – December 31, 1936
- Preceded by: Robert Reid
- Succeeded by: Amos Lee Ponder

Personal details
- Born: October 8, 1860; Catahoula Parish, Louisiana, U.S.
- Died: March 11, 1944 (aged 83)
- Spouse: Alice M. Magee
- Children: 2
- Parent(s): Robert Felix Brunot; Jane Elizabeth Brunot Neeley
- Education: Tulane University (LLB)
- Profession: Judge

Harney Felix Brunot (October 8, 1860 – March 11, 1944) was a justice of the Louisiana Supreme Court from June 4, 1923, to December 31, 1936.

Born in Catahoula Parish, Louisiana, to Robert Felix Brunot and Jane Elizabeth Brunot, née Neeley, Brunot received an LL.B. from Tulane University in 1882. He was a city attorney for Baton Rouge, Louisiana, from 1884 to 1896, when he became a judge of the Twenty-Second Judicial District Court. He held that office until 1921, except for a period from 1904 to 1906 when he held the office of State Printer. From 1921 to 1923, he was a judge of the Nineteenth Judicial District Court, and was then elected to the Louisiana Supreme Court in 1923, remaining there until 1936.

Brunot's wife, Alice M. Magee, was the state law librarian. They had a son and a daughter.

Political offices
| Preceded by Robert Reid | Justice of the Louisiana Supreme Court; 1923–1936 | Succeeded by Amos Lee Ponder |
