= E. Joseph Bleich =

American judge (born 1950)

E. Joseph Bleich (born 1950) was a justice of the Louisiana Supreme Court in 1996.

Born in Shreveport, Louisiana, Bleich graduated from Ruston High School in 1968 and attended Louisiana Tech University before receiving his J.D. from the Louisiana State University law school (now the Paul M. Hebert Law Center) at Louisiana State University in 1973. He served as an assistant district attorney for the Third Judicial District of Louisiana from 1975 to 1978, and was elected to one term in the Louisiana House of Representatives, from 1980 to 1982, during which he chaired that body's Judiciary Committee. From 1982 to 1985, he was a Louisiana District Court judge. Bleich won a special election for the Louisiana Supreme Court on May 3, 1996, to fill the seat vacated by the retirement of James L. Dennis, who had been confirmed to a seat on the United States Court of Appeals for the Fifth Circuit. Bleich was defeated in his bid for reelection to the seat by contender Chet D. Traylor whom he had defeated in the special election, and his term ended on December 31, 1996.

Political offices
Preceded by James L. Dennis	Justice of the Louisiana Supreme Court; 1996–1996	Succeeded by Chet D. Traylor
