= John Henry Ilsley =

American judge (1806–1880)

Justice of the Louisiana Supreme Court
- In office April 3, 1865 – November 1, 1868
- Preceded by: Albert Voorhies
- Succeeded by: William Wirt Howe

Personal details
- Born: June 22, 1806 London, England
- Died: May 9, 1880 (aged 73) Donaldsonville, Louisiana, U.S.
- Education: University of Oxford
- Profession: Judge

John Henry Ilsley (June 22, 1806 – May 9, 1880) was a justice of the Louisiana Supreme Court from April 3, 1865, to November 1, 1868.

Born in London, Ilsley graduated from the University of Oxford, and emigrated to the United States at the age of 19. He taught school until admitted to the bar. Several of his sons served in the Confederate States Army.

He died in Donaldsonville, Louisiana.

Political offices
Preceded by Albert Voorhies	Justice of the Louisiana Supreme Court; 1865–1868	Succeeded by William Wirt Howe
