= Judge Voorhees =

Judge Voorhees may refer to:

- Donald S. Voorhees (1916–1989), judge of the United States District Court for the Western District of Washington
- Richard Lesley Voorhees (born 1941), judge of the United States District Court for the Western District of North Carolina

== See also ==
- Justice Voorhies (disambiguation)
