= Charles Austin O'Niell =

American judge (1869–1951)

Charles Austin O'Niell (September 7, 1869 – March 9, 1951) was a justice of the Louisiana Supreme Court from April 4, 1914, to September 7, 1949, serving from December 31, 1922, on as chief justice.

In 1922, the court was reconfigured, with O'Niell being the only justice to continue in his previous capacity on the new court. Nicknamed "The Dissenter", O'Niell authored more than 3,000 judicial opinions in his time on the high court. O'Niell died in the hotel room in New Orleans where he was living at the time.

Political offices
Preceded by Joseph Arsenne Breaux	Justice of the Louisiana Supreme Court; 1914–1949	Succeeded by J. Cleveland Frugé
