= William B. Giles Egan =

American judge (1824–1878)

Associate Justice of the Louisiana Supreme Court
- In office January 9, 1877 – November 29, 1878
- Preceded by: John Edward King
- Succeeded by: Edward Douglass White

Member of the Louisiana State Senate
- In office 1865

Personal details
- Born: William Bartholomew Giles Egan; December 3, 1824 Amelia County, Virginia, U.S.
- Died: November 28, 1878 (aged 53) New Orleans, Louisiana, U.S.
- Resting place: Oakland Cemetery, Shreveport, Louisiana, U.S.
- Education: Emory and Henry College
- Profession: Lawyer, judge

William Bartholomew Giles Egan (December 3, 1824 – November 29, 1878) was a justice of the Louisiana Supreme Court from January 9, 1877, to November 29, 1878.

Born in Amelia County, Virginia, Egan graduated from Emory and Henry College in 1845, and gained admission to the bar shortly thereafter. He and his family moved to North Louisiana, where Egan "soon acquired a large practice in the Claiborne district".

In 1857, Egan was elected as a district judge, defeating a popular opponent. He was twice reelected, and after completing his final term returned to private practice. In 1877, Governor Francis T. Nicholls offered Egan an appointment to the state supreme court, which Egan accepted. Egan remained on the court until his death. Egan died in New Orleans, following a rapid decline in health, having previously improved from a period of poor health the previous summer. He was interred at Oakland Cemetery in Shreveport.

Political offices
Preceded by John Edward King	Justice of the Louisiana Supreme Court; 1877–1878	Succeeded by Edward Douglass White
