= Thomas Courtland Manning =

American judge (1825–1887)

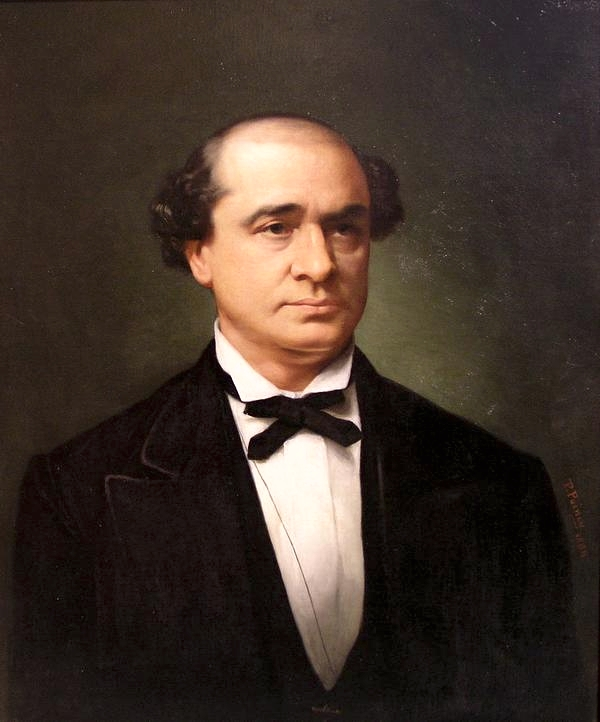
- Portrait c. 1909
- Born: September 14, 1825; Edenton, North Carolina, US
- Died: October 11, 1887; New York City, US
- Education: University of North Carolina

Thomas Courtland Manning (September 14, 1825 Edenton, North Carolina – October 11, 1887, New York City) was an American jurist and diplomat.

Manning's ancestors came from England to Virginia in the 17th century. He was graduated at the University of North Carolina, admitted to the bar, and practiced for a time in his native town. Removing in 1855 to Alexandria, Louisiana, he took up his permanent residence there and built up a large practice.

He was sent to the Secession convention of 1861 as a state-rights Democrat, and when the convention adjourned was elected a lieutenant in a Louisiana Confederate regiment, he served with the rank of lieutenant-colonel on the staff of Governor Moore, and in 1863 was appointed adjutant-general of the state, with the rank of brigadier-general. In 1864 he was appointed an associate justice of the Supreme Court of Louisiana, and served until the close of the civil war.

In 1872 he declined the nomination for governor and was a presidential elector, and in 1876 he was vice-president of the National Convention that nominated Samuel J. Tilden. In January, 1877, he was appointed Chief Justice of the Supreme Court, serving until 1880, when the adoption of a new constitution displaced the whole state government. While chief justice he was elected one of the trustees of the Peabody education fund. In 1880 he was again presidential elector, and in the autumn of that year was appointed United States Senator, but was not admitted. In 1882 he was placed for the third time on the supreme bench, and served until the expiration of his term in 1886. He was then appointed by President Grover Cleveland as United States minister to Mexico, which office he filled until his death.

Legal offices
Preceded by John T. Ludeling	Chief Justice of the Louisiana Supreme Court; 1877–1880	Succeeded by Edouard Bermudez
Diplomatic posts
Preceded by Henry R. Jackson	United States Ambassador to Mexico; 1886–1887	Succeeded by Edward S. Bragg
