= Thomas Thompson Land =

Louisiana Supreme Court justice (1815–1893)

Thomas T. Land
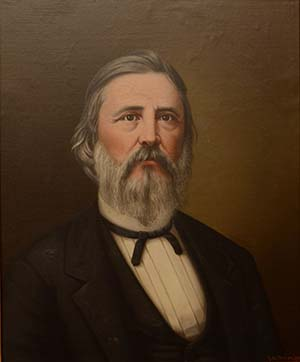

Justice of the Louisiana Supreme Court
- In office November 1, 1858 – April 1, 1865
- Preceded by: Henry M. Spofford
- Succeeded by: Zenon Labauve, Jr.

Personal details
- Born: December 17, 1815 Rutherford County, Tennessee, U.S.
- Died: June 27, 1893 (aged 77) Shreveport, Louisiana, U.S.

Thomas Thompson Land (December 17, 1815 – June 27, 1893) was an associate justice of the Louisiana Supreme Court from November 1, 1858, to April 3, 1865.

== Biography ==
Born in Rutherford County, Tennessee, with his parents Land moved first to Alabama, and then to Mississippi. He graduated from the University of Virginia, and was a member of the Mississippi Legislature in 1839. He moved to Shreveport, Louisiana in 1846, and was a judge of the District Court from 1854 to 1858, when he became a justice of the Louisiana Supreme Court. He served as a member of the Convention of 1879, where he was chairman of the judiciary committee. He was the father of Justices Alfred D. Land, and John R. Land. He died in Shreveport, Louisiana.

Legal offices
Preceded by Henry M. Spofford	Associate Justice of the Louisiana Supreme Court; 1858–1865	Succeeded by Zenon Labauve, Jr.
