= Nathaniel W. Bond =

American judge (1892–1948)

Nathaniel W. "Nat" Bond (October 14, 1892 – February 18, 1948) was a justice of the Louisiana Supreme Court from June 2, 1947, to February 18, 1948.

Born in New Orleans, Louisiana. Bond graduated from Tulane University Law School in 1913, and served in the Louisiana House of Representatives from 1916 to 1918. He served as a city attorney for New Orleans and a judge of the civil district court before being elected to the state supreme court in 1947.

Bond began to suffer from health problems shortly after his election to the court, although he was able to work for a time. He died in his home at the age of 55, having been ill for several months.

Political offices
Preceded by Wynne Grey Rogers	Justice of the Louisiana Supreme Court; 1947–1948	Succeeded by Harold A. Moise
