= Joe Busbey Hamiter =

American judge (1899–1986)

Joe Busbey Hamiter (November 6, 1899 – January 7, 1986) was a justice of the Louisiana Supreme Court from January 1, 1943 to July 30, 1970, serving briefly as chief justice from August 1 to December 30, 1970.

Born in Shreveport, Louisiana, Hamiter graduated from Shreveport High School in 1917 and attended Louisiana State University until 1919. After a hiatus spent farming and working in real estate and insurance, he returned to LSU in January 1921, receiving his LL.B. in 1923, as valedictorian of his class. Hamiter entered the practice of law in Shreveport, and served two terms representing Caddo Parish in the Louisiana House of Representatives, from 1928 to 1935, where he generally opposed the efforts of supporters of Governor Huey Long.

Hamiter was elected to the Louisiana Second Circuit Court of Appeal in 1935, taking office in January 1936. He was elected to a fourteen-year term to the state supreme court in 1942, taking office in January 1943, and running unopposed for reelection to another fourteen-year term in 1956, remaining on the court until the end of 1970. Hamiter served as chief justice for the last five months of his tenure.

== Personal life and death ==
Hamiter married Hattie Wells Courtney on September 21, 1942. She predeceased him, and they had no children.

He died at his home in Shreveport.

Political offices
Preceded by E. Howard McCaleb	Justice of the Louisiana Supreme Court; 1943–1970	Succeeded by Albert Tate Jr.
