= Harold A. Moise =

American judge (1879–1958)

Harold Alexander Moise

Louisiana Supreme Court (Associate Justice)
- In office 1948–1958
- Preceded by: Nathaniel W. Bond
- Succeeded by: Walter B. Hamlin

Judge of the Louisiana Civil District Court of New Orleans
- In office 1937–1948

Louisiana State Representative for the 12th Ward of New Orleans
- In office 1908–1912

Personal details
- Born: August 23, 1879 Natchitoches, Louisiana, U.S.
- Died: September 16, 1958 (aged 79) New Orleans
- Resting place: Garden of Memories Cemetery, Metairie
- Party: Democratic
- Spouses: Io Leigh Bres (m. 1903; died 1927); Amelia Keyes O'Neal Harris (m. 1930)
- Children: Five children from first marriage, including Harold Moise, Jr.
- Parent(s): Judge James Campbell and Aline Sompayrac Moise
- Education: Cote Brilliante University of St. Louis; Tulane University Law School
- Occupation: Lawyer and Judge

Harold Alexander Moise, Sr. (August 23, 1879 – September 16, 1958), was from 1948 until his death a justice of the Louisiana Supreme Court, based in New Orleans, Louisiana.

== Background ==
Born in Natchitoches, Louisiana, Moise was the third son of Judge James Campbell Moise and Aline Sompayrac Moise.

He graduated in 1899 from the Roman Catholic Christian Brothers College, and in 1902 from the Tulane University Law School in New Orleans, at which he was president of his class and was selected as the salutatorian.

Moise was married to Io Leigh Bres from January 1903 until her death in 1927; the couple had three daughters and two sons, including Harold Moise, Jr., who served as the clerk of the state Supreme Court from 1969 to 1978. In 1930, Moise married Amelia Keyes O'Neal Harris.

== Career ==
Moise then commenced the practice of law until 1908, when he was elected to a single four-year term to represent the 12th Ward of New Orleans in the Louisiana House of Representatives. He was assistant attorney for the Orleans Levee Board from 1912 to 1916, and served as general counsel of the board of commissioners of the Port of New Orleans from 1920 to 1936. In 1920, he was also a leading member of the successful campaign to elect John M. Parker as governor of Louisiana. He was a delegate to the Louisiana Constitutional Convention of 1921.

In 1937, Moise was elected to Division C of the Civil District Court of Louisiana in New Orleans. He became the presiding judge of that court in 1947. One of his final cases on the civil court was an effort by a vending machine company to prevent the city of New Orleans from seizing and destroying certain "mint vending bell machines." Moise was set to hear the case in 1948, but it was reassigned because he advanced to the Supreme Court. Governor Huey Long had intended to call a special election to fill the vacancy created on that court by the death of Nathaniel W. Bond, but after all three of the Democratic organizations of that district endorsed Moise, Long called off the election and appointed Moise directly. In 1952, Moise ran unopposed for election to a full 14-year term on the court, serving thereafter until his death, in New Orleans. He was succeeded on the court by Walter B. Hamlin.

Legal offices
Preceded by Nathaniel W. Bond	Justice of the Louisiana Supreme Court; 1948-1958	Succeeded by Walter B. Hamlin
