= Harry T. Lemmon =

American judge (1930–2025)

Harry Thomas Lemmon (December 11, 1930 – April 18, 2025) was an American judge who was a justice of the Louisiana Supreme Court from May 16, 1980, to May 16, 2001.

== Early life, education, and military service ==
Born in Morgan City, Louisiana, Lemmon graduated from Morgan City High School in 1948, and received a degree in chemistry from the University of Southwestern Louisiana in 1952. After briefly working as a chemist for American Oil Company, he served in the United States Army Chemical Corps in the Korean War. He graduated from Loyola University New Orleans College of Law in 1963, and was in private practice from then until 1970.

== Judicial service ==
Lemmon became a judge of the Louisiana Fourth Circuit Court of Appeal in 1970, serving in that capacity until his election to the state supreme court in 1980 to serve out the unexpired term of Justice Frank W. Summers, following the latter's elevation to chief justice. Lemmon declined to run for another full term on the court because he would be forced to retire upon meeting the mandatory retirement age just a few years into such a new term. In addition to his judicial service, Lemmon co-authored the Louisiana Civil Law Treatise on Civil Procedure.

== Personal life and death ==
Lemmon married Mary Ann Vial, an attorney who later became a United States District Judge, with whom he had six children.

Lemmon died on April 18, 2025, at the age of 94.

Political offices
Preceded by Frank W. Summers	Justice of the Louisiana Supreme Court; 1980–2001	Succeeded by John L. Weimer
