= Chet D. Traylor =

American judge in Louisiana (born 1945)

Louisiana Supreme Court Associate Justice (Place 4)
- In office January 1, 1997 – May 31, 2009
- Preceded by: Joe Bleich
- Succeeded by: Marcus R. Clark

Fifth Judicial District Court Judge
- In office 1985–1997
- Preceded by: Sonny N. Stephens
- Succeeded by: E. Rudolph McIntyre, Jr.

Personal details
- Born: October 12, 1945 (age 80) Columbia, Louisiana, U.S.
- Party: Republican
- Spouse: (1) Mary Blake Adams (2) Peggy Marie McDowell Ellington (died 2009)
- Children: Therese T. Nagem Leigh T. Liles Anna T. Holloway
- Education: Caldwell Parish High School University of Louisiana at Monroe Loyola University New Orleans College of Law
- Occupation: Judge; Attorney

Chet D. Traylor (born October 12, 1945) is a former Associate Justice of the Louisiana Supreme Court, having served in that capacity from 1997 to 2009.

Traylor announced his candidacy for the supreme court prior to the January 1996 qualifying period.

He graduated in 1964 from Caldwell Parish High School, where one of his classmates was W. Fox McKeithen, the future Secretary of State of Louisiana.

Legal offices
Preceded by Joe Bleich	Louisiana Supreme Court Associate Justice, Place 4 Chet D. Traylor; 1997–2009	Succeeded by Marcus R. Clark
Preceded by Sonny N. Stephens	Louisiana 5th Judicial District Court Judge Chet D. Traylor; 1985–1997	Succeeded by E. Rudolph McIntyre, Jr.
