= Cornelius Voorhies =

American judge (1804–1859)

Cornelius Voorhies (July 22, 1804 – July 1, 1859) was a justice of the Louisiana Supreme Court from May 4, 1853 to April 27, 1859.

Voorhies, "of Dutch descent", was born in the state of Louisiana on July 22, 1804. Two sources disagree on his birthplace: Celebration of the Centenary of the Supreme Court of Louisiana, dated to 1913, states that Voorhies was born in Avoyelles Parish, while the Dictionary of Louisiana Biography states that Voorhies' birthplace was Opelousas, in neighboring St. Landry Parish.

He served as a district attorney, as a state senator, and as a district judge.

He became an associate justice of the Louisiana Supreme Court on May 4, 1853, and served in that position until April 27, 1859, when he retired.

Voorhies died in his St. Martinville home on July 1, 1859. His death was mourned by the Lafayette Parish District Court the day after.

He had nine children with his wife Cedalise Mouton, including Lieutenant Governor of Louisiana Albert Voorhies, who succeeded him on the court, and state legislator Felix Voorhies. His son succeeded him on the bench.

Political offices
Preceded by Newly constituted court	Justice of the Louisiana Supreme Court; 1853–1859	Succeeded by Albert Voorhies
