= Thomas Bell Monroe =

American judge

Judge of the United States District Court for the District of Kentucky
- In office March 8, 1834 – September 18, 1861
- Appointed by: Andrew Jackson
- Preceded by: John Boyle
- Succeeded by: Bland Ballard

15th Secretary of State of Kentucky
- In office September 2, 1823 – September 1, 1824
- Governor: John Adair
- Preceded by: Cabell Breckinridge
- Succeeded by: William T. Barry

Personal details
- Born: Thomas Bell Monroe; October 7, 1791 Albemarle County, Virginia, U.S.
- Died: December 24, 1865 (aged 74) Pass Christian, Mississippi, U.S.
- Relatives: Frank A. Monroe (grandson)
- Education: Transylvania University read law

Thomas Bell Monroe (October 7, 1791 – December 24, 1865) was the 15th Secretary of State of Kentucky and a United States district judge of the United States District Court for the District of Kentucky.

== Education and career ==
Born on October 7, 1791, in Albemarle County, Virginia, Monroe attended Transylvania University and read law in 1821. He was a member of the Kentucky House of Representatives in 1816. He entered private practice in Frankfort, Kentucky starting in 1821. He was the 15th Secretary of State of Kentucky from 1823 to 1824. He was reporter for the Kentucky Court of Appeals starting in 1825. He was the United States Attorney for the District of Kentucky from 1830 to 1834.

== Federal judicial service ==
Monroe was nominated by President Andrew Jackson on February 20, 1834, to a seat on the United States District Court for the District of Kentucky vacated by Judge John Boyle. He was confirmed by the United States Senate on March 6, 1834, and received his commission on March 8, 1834. His service terminated on September 18, 1861, due to his resignation.

=== Other service ===
Concurrent with his federal judicial service, Monroe was a law teacher in Montrose, Kentucky from 1843 to 1848, Chairman of the Law Department at Transylvania University starting in 1848, and a professor of law at Tulane University from 1848 to circa 1851.

== Later career and death ==
Following his resignation from the federal bench, Monroe was a delegate from Kentucky to the Provisional Congress of the Confederate States from 1861 to 1862. He resumed private practice in Richmond, Virginia in 1862. He died on December 24, 1865, in Pass Christian, Mississippi.

His grandson is Frank A. Monroe, who served as a justice of the Louisiana Supreme Court from 1899 to 1922.

== Sources ==
Political offices
Preceded by Cabell Breckinridge	Secretary of State of Kentucky; 1823—1824	Succeeded by James C. Pickett
Legal offices
Preceded by John Boyle	Judge of the United States District Court for the District of Kentucky; 1834–1861	Succeeded by Bland Ballard
