= Mack E. Barham =

American judge (1924–2006)

Mack Elwin Barham

Justice of the Louisiana Supreme Court (Place Four)
- In office 1968–1975
- Preceded by: Francis Willard Hawthorne
- Succeeded by: James L. Dennis

Judge of the 4th Judicial District of Louisiana based in Monroe
- In office 1962–1968

Municipal Judge in Bastrop, Louisiana
- In office 1948–1962

Personal details
- Born: June 18, 1924 Bastrop, Morehouse Parish; Louisiana, USA
- Died: November 27, 2006 (aged 82) Covington; St. Tammany Parish, Louisiana
- Party: Democratic
- Spouse: Ann Lavois Barham
- Children: Bret Lane Barham; Megan B. Richardson
- Education: Louisiana State University Law Center
- Occupation: Judge; Attorney

Mack Elwin Barham (June 18, 1924 – November 27, 2006) was justice of the Louisiana Supreme Court from 1968 to 1975.

== Early life and education ==
Barham attended the University of Colorado Boulder and received his Bachelor of Laws (LL.B.) from the Louisiana State University Law Center in 1946. He attended the National College of State Trial Judges at the University of Colorado Boulder in 1966.
