= Albert Voorhies =

Louisiana Supreme Court Justice, lawyer, politician

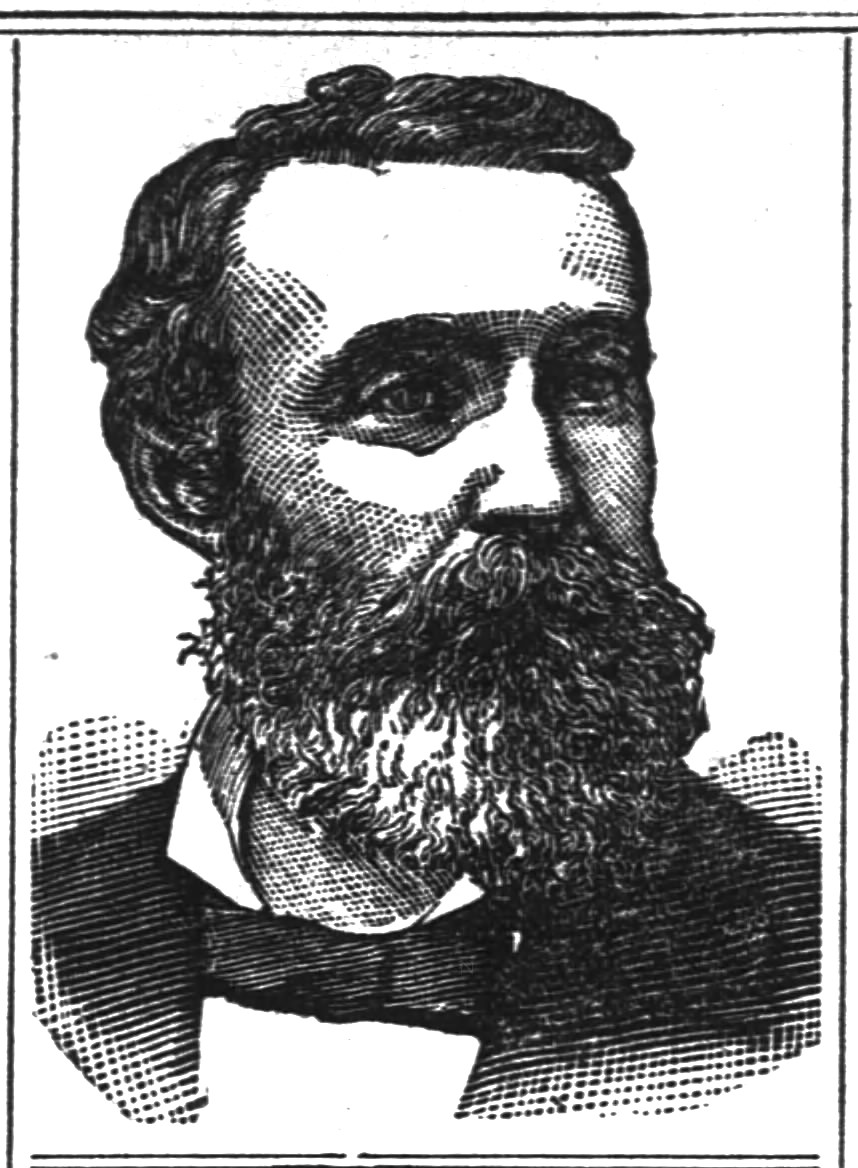
Albert Voorhies (1829–1913), Louisiana Supreme Court Justice & Lieutenant Governor

Albert Voorhies (January 23, 1829 – January 20, 1913) was the tenth lieutenant governor of Louisiana, serving under Governor James Madison Wells from March 4, 1865 – June 3, 1867. He was a pro-slavery Southern Democrat and often at odds with the pro-suffrage, anti-slavery, Radical Republican Wells. He also found a career in justice and worked his way up to the Louisiana Supreme Court, where he succeeded his father, Cornelius Voorhies, and served from April 1859 to April 1865. He died January 20, 1913, in Lafayette Parish, Louisiana at the age of 83 years and 362 days.

== Personal life ==
Voorhies was born in St. Martinville, Louisiana, to Cornelius and Marie Cidalise Voorhies. He married Marie Leotand Durand and with her had 6 children.

Political offices
Preceded by James M. Wells	Lieutenant Governor of Louisiana; 1865–1866	Succeeded by Oscar J. Dunn
Preceded by Cornelius Voorhies	Justice of the Louisiana Supreme Court; 1859–1865	Succeeded by John Henry Ilsley
