= David N. Thompson =

American judge (1859–1945)

David Newton Thompson (January 7, 1859 – November 28, 1945) was a justice of the Louisiana Supreme Court from December 5, 1922, to December 1, 1930.

Born in Harrisonburg, Catahoula Parish, Louisiana, Thompson was a Deputy Clerk of Court and Recorder of Deeds and Mortgages before serving as District Attorney for the Eighth Judicial District of Louisiana from 1892 to 1900. He was then a judge of that district until 1908, and judge of the state's Court of Appeal for the Second Circuit from 1908 to 1922. He served on the Louisiana Supreme Court for eight years, from 1922 to 1930.

Thompson died in his home, in Monroe, Louisiana, at the age of 86, following a long illness.

Political offices
Preceded by Court reconfigured	Justice of the Louisiana Supreme Court; 1922–1930	Succeeded by Frederick M. Odom
