= Frank Summers (judge) =

American judge (1914–1993)

Chief Justice of the Louisiana Supreme Court
- In office January 1, 1979 – February 29, 1980
- Preceded by: Joe W. Sanders
- Succeeded by: Harry T. Lemmon

Associate Justice of the Louisiana Supreme Court
- In office December 12, 1960 – December 31, 1978
- Preceded by: Rene A. Viosca
- Succeeded by: Fred A. Blanche Jr.

Personal details
- Born: Frank Wynerth Summers; September 5, 1914 Abbeville, Louisiana, U.S.
- Died: January 26, 1993 (aged 78) Abbeville, Louisiana, U.S.
- Spouse: Beverly Miller (m. 1940)
- Children: 6
- Parent(s): Clay Ralph Summers; Esther LeBlanc
- Education: Southwestern Louisiana Institute (BA); Tulane University Law School (LLB)
- Profession: Lawyer, judge

Military service
- Allegiance: United States
- Years of service: 1945
- Rank: Lieutenant commander
- Battles/wars: Pacific War

Frank Wynerth Summers (September 5, 1914 – January 26, 1993) was an associate justice of the Louisiana Supreme Court from December 12, 1960, to December 31, 1978, and chief justice from January 1, 1979, to February 29, 1980.

== Early life, education, and military service ==
Born in Abbeville, Louisiana to Clay Ralph Summers and Esther LeBlanc, Summers attended the Abbeville public schools and received a B.A. from Southwestern Louisiana Institute in 1936, where he lettered in football and track. He received an LL.B. from Tulane University Law School in 1938 and entered the practice of law in Abbeville. A naval reservist, Summers was called to active duty to serve in the Pacific theatre of World War II, first with the Office of Naval Intelligence, and then commanding the amphibious tank-landing ship USS LST-871. His command lasted from January 15, 1945 to October 20, 1945, and Summers achieved the rank of lieutenant commander before the end of his service in November 1945. Summers thereafter returned to the practice of law.

== Political activities and judicial service ==
Summers became increasingly active in politics, managing the successful gubernatorial campaign of Robert F. Kennon in 1952, and the failed bid of DeLesseps Story Morrison in 1960, and supporting the presidential campaign of John F. Kennedy.

From August 1952 to 1955, Summers was a judge of the Louisiana Fifteenth Judicial District Court, thereafter returning to private practice until 1960, when he ran for a seat on the Louisiana Supreme Court. In October 1960, he was elected to that seat, becoming chief justice January 1, 1979. As chief justice, he "was instrumental in transferring the Criminal Appellate Court Jurisdiction from the Supreme Court to the Appellate Court". He resigned to focus on the management of his family farm and cattle ranch.

== Personal life ==
In June 1940, Summers married Beverly Miller, with whom he had six children. He died in his home, in Abbeville, at the age of 78.

Political offices
| Preceded by Joe W. Sanders | Chief Justice of the Louisiana Supreme Court; 1979–1980 | Succeeded by Harry T. Lemmon |
| Preceded by Rene A. Viosca | Justice of the Louisiana Supreme Court; 1960–1979 | Succeeded by Fred A. Blanche Jr. |
