= John R. Land =

American judge (1862–1941)

Justice of the Louisiana Supreme Court
- In office October 13, 1921 – April 18, 1941
- Preceded by: Newly established seat
- Succeeded by: E. Howard McCaleb

Member of the Louisiana House of Representatives
- In office 1888–1890

Personal details
- Born: John Rutherford Land; July 9, 1862 Lexington, Mississippi, U.S.
- Died: April 18, 1941 (aged 78)
- Parent: Thomas Thompson Land (father)
- Relatives: Alfred D. Land (brother)
- Profession: Judge

John Rutherford Land (July 9, 1862 – April 18, 1941) was a justice of the Louisiana Supreme Court from October 13, 1921, to April 18, 1941.

Born in Lexington, Mississippi, he was the son of Thomas Thompson Land, a prominent attorney who also served on the state Supreme Court.

He served in the Louisiana House of Representatives from 1888 to 1890. He won election to a newly established seat on the Supreme Court in August 1921.

His brother, Alfred D. Land, also served on the state Supreme Court.

Political offices
Preceded by Newly established seat	Justice of the Louisiana Supreme Court; 1921–1941	Succeeded by E. Howard McCaleb
