= John St. Paul =

American judge (1867–1939)

Associate Justice of the Louisiana Supreme Court
- In office January 2, 1922 – April 30, 1934
- Preceded by: Court reconfigured
- Succeeded by: Archibald T. Higgins

Judge of the Court of Appeal for the Parish of Orleans
- In office 1909–1922

Judge of the Orleans Parish Civil District Court
- In office 1899–1909

Member of the Louisiana House of Representatives
- In office 1896–1899

Personal details
- Born: 1867 Mobile, Alabama
- Died: November 5, 1939 (age 72) New Orleans, Louisiana
- Education: Tulane University (LL.B.); Spring Hill College (M.A.); Loyola University New Orleans (LL.D.)

John St. Paul (1867 – November 5, 1939) was a justice of the Louisiana Supreme Court from January 2, 1922, to April 30, 1934.

Born in Mobile, Alabama, St. Paul received an LL.B. degree from Tulane University in 1886, followed by an M.A. from Spring Hill College and an LL.D. from Loyola University New Orleans. He entered the private practice of law in 1892, and then served in the Louisiana House of Representatives from 1896 to 1899, during which time he was elected to the Louisiana Constitutional Convention of 1898, where he helped write the provision governing voting rights. He thereafter served as a judge of the Orleans Parish Civil District Court from 1899 to 1909, then of the Court of Appeal for the Parish of Orleans from 1909 to 1922. In 1914, he was the founding dean of the Loyola University New Orleans College of Law, "choosing the faculty and preparing the curriculum". He was elected as an associate justice of the Louisiana Supreme Court in 1922, serving until his resignation due to health issues in 1934.

St. Paul died at his home in New Orleans, at the age of 72.

Political offices
Preceded by Court reconfigured	Justice of the Louisiana Supreme Court; 1922–1934	Succeeded by Archibald T. Higgins
