= Alfred D. Land =

American judge (1842–1917)

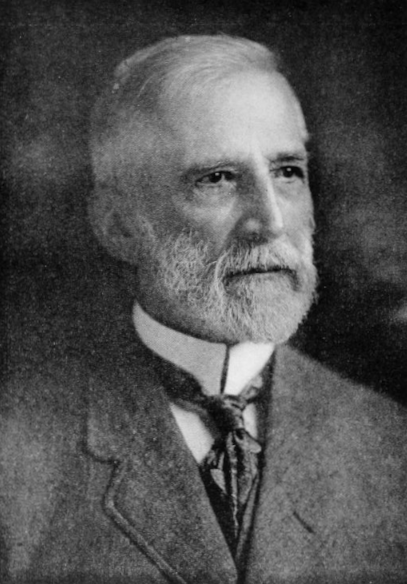

Justice of the Louisiana Supreme Court
- In office October 17, 1903 – June 4, 1917

Personal details
- Born: Alfred Dillingham Land; January 15, 1842; Holmes County, Mississippi, US
- Died: June 4, 1917 (aged 75); New Orleans, Louisiana, US
- Parent: Thomas Thompson Land (father)
- Education: University of Louisiana

Alfred Dillingham Land (January 15, 1842 – June 4, 1917) was a justice of the Louisiana Supreme Court from October 17, 1903 to June 4, 1917.

== Biography ==
Born in Holmes County, Mississippi, he was the son of Thomas Thompson Land, a prominent attorney who also served on the state supreme court.

Land came to Shreveport, Louisiana as a child and attended the local schools, and then spent two terms at Centenary College and two terms at the University of Virginia. He received his diploma from the law school of the University of Louisiana (now Tulane University) in May 1961.

Land served in the Confederate Army during the American Civil War, first joining Company H Seventh Louisiana Volunteer Infantry and served with his command at the First Battle of Bull Run on July 21, 1861, and in minor engagements the same year. In 1862 he enlisted in Company A Twenty-eighth Mississippi Cavalry and in 1863 was assigned to Harvey's Scouts, in which he served until badly wounded and honorably discharged in January 1864. In 1865 Judge Land was admitted to the bar. He practiced in New Orleans for a year and a half, and then he returned to Shreveport where he practiced until his election to the bench.

He was elected in 1894 as additional judge of the first judicial district parish of Caddo, and reelected without opposition in 1896 and 1900. He also served on the Constitutional Convention Committees of 1893 and 1894, whose recommendations as to suffrage and several other provisions were incorporated in whole or in part in the constitution of 1898. In October 1903 Governor William Wright Heard appointed Land to a seat as an associate justice of the supreme court from the second supreme court district vacated by the resignation of Justice Newton C. Blanchard. Land was reelected in 1912.

Land died in his home in New Orleans following a stroke, at the age of 75. His brother John R. Land, also a Louisiana Supreme Court Justice, was at his side when he died.

Political offices
Preceded by Newton C. Blanchard	Justice of the Louisiana Supreme Court; 1903–1917	Succeeded by Paul Leche
