= Edwin T. Merrick =

American judge (1809–1897)

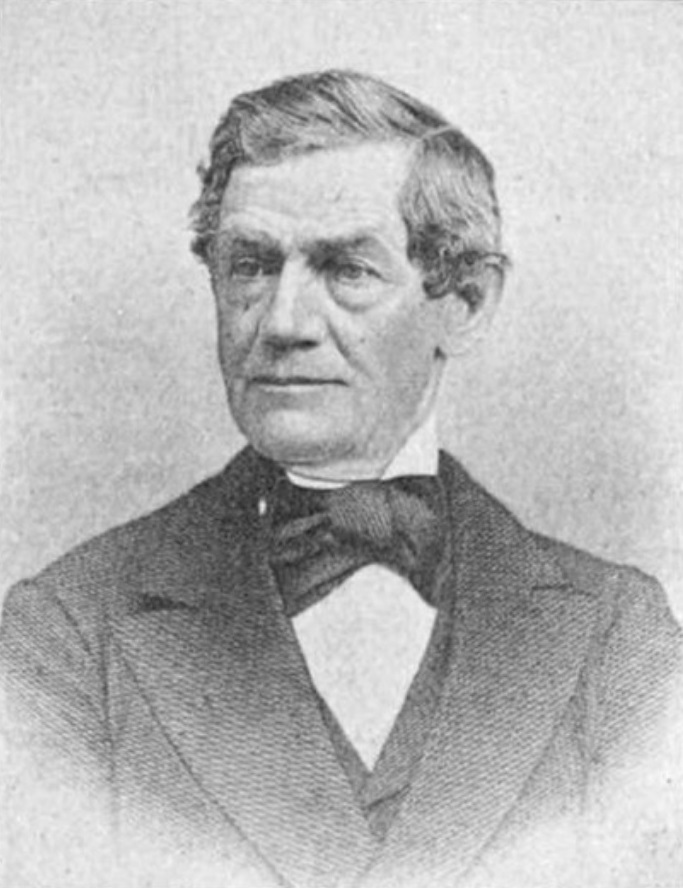

Chief Justice of the Louisiana Supreme Court
- In office July 1855 – April 3, 1865
- Preceded by: Thomas Slidell
- Succeeded by: Court restructured

Personal details
- Born: Edwin Thomas Merrick; July 9, 1809 Wilbraham, Massachusetts, U.S.
- Died: January 12, 1897 (aged 87) New Orleans, Louisiana, U.S.
- Spouse: Caroline Elizabeth Thomas
- Children: 4
- Occupation: Lawyer, judge

Edwin Thomas Merrick (July 9, 1809 – January 12, 1897) was the third Chief Justice of the Louisiana Supreme Court from July 1855 to April 3, 1865.

== Biography ==
Edwin T. Merrick was born in Wilbraham, Massachusetts on July 9, 1809. He moved to Ohio, where he was admitted to the Bar of Ohio in 1833, and then in 1838 moved to Clinton, Louisiana. There, he was appointed as a district judge, and upon the resignation of Louisiana Supreme Court Chief Justice Slidell in 1855, Merrick was elected to that office. Merrick is reported as having been "a very industrious, able, and efficient judge".

Though in politics he was "an earnest Whig and Union man", once the American Civil War had begun, he "embraced with great zeal the Southern cause". When New Orleans was occupied by Federal troops, he went with the Confederate State Government to Shreveport, where the Supreme Court met and discharged its duties. After the war he returned to the private practice of law in New Orleans, and as of the 1890s was reported as still being an "active, persevering, and laborious practitioner at the bar".

At the age of 37, he married 15-year-old Caroline Elizabeth Merrick, who went on to become noted as an American writer and temperance worker. They had two sons and two daughters.

He died in New Orleans on January 12, 1897. He was a member of The Boston Club of New Orleans.

Political offices
Preceded by Thomas Slidell	Chief Justice of the Louisiana Supreme Court; 1855–1865	Succeeded by Court restructured
