= Walter B. Sommerville =

American judge (1854–1924)

Walter Byers Sommerville (October 7, 1854 – October 13, 1924) was a justice of the Louisiana Supreme Court from March 18, 1911, to October 13, 1921.

Born in New Orleans, Louisiana, Sommerville was a law clerk for Louisiana Attorneys General H.N. Ogden and James C. Egan. He was an Assistant City Attorney for New Orleans, and Judge of the Orleans Parish Civil District Court from 1900 to 1911. On March 7, 1911, Sommerville was elected to the Louisiana Supreme Court unopposed, as the Democratic Party discouraged any opposition within the party, and no other party had a chance of winning the seat.

Political offices
Preceded by Francis T. Nicholls	Justice of the Louisiana Supreme Court; 1911–1921	Succeeded by Court reconfigured
