= Florent Edouard Simon =

American judge (1799–1866)

Florent Edouard Simon (or Edward Simon; May 26, 1799 – 1866) was a justice of the Louisiana Supreme Court from January 1, 1840, to March 19, 1846.

Born in Tournai, in the province of Hainaut, Belgium, he studied at the University of Louvain, and studied civil law at Brussels. Following the annexation of Belgium to Holland, Simon emigrated to London in 1817, and from there to Baltimore, where he went into the cotton business. He moved to Louisiana, settling at St. Martinville. There, he was encouraged to finish his legal studies by his friend Felix Grima, a judge of the state.

After retirement from bench, became a sugar planter. He was the first of five consecutive generations of Louisiana judges, and his great-grandson, James Dudley Simon, also served on the Louisiana Supreme Court.

Political offices
| Preceded by Court reorganized | Justice of the Louisiana Supreme Court; 1840–1846 | Succeeded by Court reorganized |
