= Eloi F. X. Dugas =

American politician (died 1902)

Eloi F. X. Dugas (died 1902) was a politician in Louisiana. He served in the Louisiana House of Representatives and the Louisiana Senate. He was a Democrat.

Dugas was raised Roman Catholic; having, with his wife, donated the bell and tower located outside of St. Elizabeth Catholic Church in Paincourtville. After the war he lived a very active life, in both business and politics. He was president, respectively, of the Bank of Napoleonville and of the Pioneer Printing Co. He also served as a member of the Louisiana House of Representatives and later as a member of the Louisiana State Senate. He "accomplished gratifying results in the advancement and upbuilding of that portion of Louisiana in which his life work was cast".

== See also ==
- Moses R. Hite
