= James D. Simon =

American judge (1897–1982)

Justice of the Louisiana Supreme Court
- In office January 1, 1955 – August 23, 1960

Judge, Louisiana 16th Judicial District Court
- In office 1925–1955
- Preceded by: Samuel A. LeBlanc
- Succeeded by: Joe W. Sanders

Louisiana State Senator for St. Martin and Lafayette parishes
- In office 1921–1925
- Preceded by: J. R. Domengeaux
- Succeeded by: Donald Labbe

Personal details
- Born: January 30, 1897 St. Martinville, Louisiana, U.S.
- Died: October 23, 1982 (aged 85)
- Resting place: St. Michael's Cemetery in St. Martinville
- Citizenship: United States
- Party: Democratic
- Education: Louisiana State University; Tulane University Law School
- Occupation: Lawyer, judge

Military service
- Branch/service: United States Army
- Years of service: World War I (1918–1919)
- Rank: Lieutenant

James Dudley Simon (January 30, 1897 – October 23, 1982) was an American politician and judge who served on the Louisiana Supreme Court from 1955 to 1960.

Born in St. Martinville, Louisiana, Simon graduated from the Tulane University Law School in 1918 and then served in World War I. He served in the Louisiana State Senate from 1921 to 1925 and was thereafter a district court judge from 1925 to 1941, when he received a temporary appointed to the Orleans Court of Appeals until 1942. Simon was elected to the state supreme court in January 1955 and retired on August 23, 1960.

Preceded by J. R. Domengeaux	Louisiana State Senator for St. Martin and Lafayette parishes James Dudley Simon; 1921–1925	Succeeded by Donald Labbe
