= Walter B. Hamlin =

American judge (1898–1984)

Walter Bergen Hamlin (March 13, 1898 – January 1, 1984) was a justice of the Louisiana Supreme Court from December 15, 1958, to March 13, 1973, serving as Chief Justice after December 26, 1972.

== Early life, education, and career ==
Born in New Orleans, Hamlin attended the public schools in New Orleans public schools, and that city's Soule Business College. He served in World War I as an infantry sergeant, and then received an LL.B. from Loyola University New Orleans in 1919. He thereafter engaged in the private practice of law until 1948, interrupted by service in the United States Navy in World War II, where he achieved the rank of Lieutenant Commander.

== Judicial service ==
In 1948, he was elected to a seat on the Civil District Court for Orleans Parish, and was re-elected without opposition 1952. In 1958 he was elected to the state supreme court, to which he was reelected without opposition in 1966, and where he remained for fifteen years, until reaching the mandatory retirement age of 75. He served as chief justice for a period of months before his retirement.

== Personal life and death ==
In 1923, Hamlin married Stella I. Malynn, who predeceased him. Hamlin died in New Orleans at the age of 85, following a brief illness. He was interred at the Hope Mausoleum.

Political offices
Preceded by Harold A. Moise	Justice of the Louisiana Supreme Court; 1958–1973	Succeeded by Pascal F. Calogero Jr.
