= James Neilson Lea =

American judge (1815–1884)

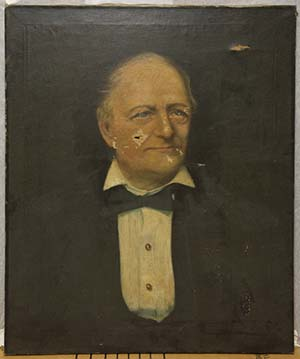
- Born: 26 November 1815; New Orleans
- Died: 26 October 1884 (aged 68); Wilkes-Barre
- Alma mater: Yale University

James Neilson Lea (November 26, 1815 – October 26, 1884) was a Louisiana state legislator and justice of the Louisiana Supreme Court.

Lea was born in New Orleans, November 26, 1815, the son of Dr. Squire and Eliza (Nelson) Lea. He graduated from Yale College in 1834. He studied law with his uncle, Judge Samuel H. Harper, of New Orleans, and was admitted to the Louisiana bar in 1836. His practice was attended with success, and in 1846 he was elected a member of the Louisiana House of Representatives, and in 1847 was appointed Judge of the Second District Court of New Orleans, which office he retained for several years. Subsequently, after the change in the State Constitution (in 1852) by which the judiciary were made elective, he was elected to the same judicial office which he had already held. He was chosen in 1855 one of the Associate Justices of the Supreme Court of Louisiana. After his term of service on the bench, he returned to the bar. After the American Civil War he became Professor of Civil Law at Washington and Lee College. He retired from practice in 1874, and the next year removed his residence to Lexington, Virginia, where he lived greatly respected for the rest of his days. After some months of declining strength, he went on a visit to Wilkes-Barre, Pennsylvania, in search of health, but died in Wilkes Barre, October 26, 1884, at the age of 69.

He married, March 16, 1841, Hetty H. McNair, by whom he had six children, of whom two daughters and a son survived him. He next married Mary R. Duncan, daughter of Dennis A. Smith, of Baltimore, Maryland, and widow of Lucius C. Duncan, of New Orleans, who survived him.
