= List of Louisiana Supreme Court elections =

This article will list elections to the Louisiana Supreme Court. Justices are elected to ten-year terms, and special elections are held in case of vacancies.

== 2024–present ==
Supreme Court district map since May 2024

These elections were held under the state supreme court map effective since May 1, 2024.

=== Elected with party primaries ===
Election	District	Incumbent				Maximum round
Election	District	Justice	Party	First elected	Result	Maximum round
Nov. 3, 2026	1st (sp)	William J. Crain	Republican	2019	Incumbent resigned December 19, 2025, to become judge of the United States District Court for the Eastern District of Louisiana.	▌Billy Burris (Republican); ▌Blair Downing Edwards (Republican)
Nov. 3, 2026	3rd	Cade Cole	Republican	2025	Incumbent running for re-election.	▌Cade Cole (Republican)
Nov. 3, 2026	4th	Jay B. McCallum	Republican	2020	Incumbent running for re-election.	▌Jay B. McCallum (Republican)

=== Elected with jungle primaries ===
Election	District	Incumbent				Maximum round
Election	District	Justice	Party	First elected	Result	Maximum round
~~Mar. 29, 2025 (sp)~~	3rd	James T. Genovese	Republican	2016	Incumbent resigned after being appointed president of Northwestern State University. Republican hold.	▌ ✓ Cade Cole (Republican) Unopposed
~~Nov. 4, 2024~~	2nd	Scott Chrichton	Republican	2014	Incumbent retiring. Democratic gain.	▌ ✓ John Guidry (Democratic) Unopposed; ▌~~Marcus Hunter (Democratic)~~ Disqualified; ▌~~Leslie Chambers (Democratic)~~ Disqualified

== 1999–2024 ==
These elections were held under the state supreme court map effective from January 1, 1999, to April 30, 2024.

Election	District	Incumbent				Maximum round	Results map
Election	District	Justice	Party	First elected	Result	Maximum round	Results map
Nov. 8, 2022	4th	John L. Weimer	No party	2001	Incumbent re-elected.	▌ ✓ John L. Weimer (No party) Unopposed	
Nov. 6, 2020	4th	Marcus R. Clark	Republican	2009	Incumbent retired June 30, 2020. Republican hold.	▌ ✓ Jay B. McCallum (Republican) 122,458 votes, 56.69%; ▌Shannon Gremillion (Republican) 93,569 votes, 43.31%	McCallum: 50–60%; 60–70%; 70–80%; 80–90%; Gremillion: 50–60%; 60–70%
Nov. 6, 2020	7th	Bernette Joshua Johnson	Democratic	1994	Incumbent retiring. Democratic hold.	▌ ✓ Piper D. Griffin (Democratic) 78,603 votes, 43.93%; ▌ Terri Love (Democratic) 56,387 votes, 31.51% (Note: Love advanced to the runoff, but withdrew prior to the election); ▌ Sandra C. Jenkins (Democratic) 43,949 votes, 24.56%	Griffin: 30–40%; 40–50%
Nov. 16, 2019 (sp)	1st	Greg G. Guidry	Republican	2008	Incumbent resigned June 21, 2019, to become judge of the United States District Court for the Eastern District of Louisiana. Republican hold.	▌ ✓ William J. Crain (Republican) 127,211 votes, 57.28%; ▌Hans Liljeberg (Republican) 94,875 votes, 42.72%	Crain: 60–70%; 80–90%; Liljeberg: 50–60%; 60–70%

== See also ==
- Elections in Louisiana
