= List of Paul M. Hebert Law Center alumni =

The Paul M. Hebert Law Center is a public law school located on the main campus of Louisiana State University in Baton Rouge, Louisiana. It is sometimes referred to as the Louisiana State University Law Center. Following are some of its notable alumni.

== Academia ==
- Alston Johnson, professor of law at Louisiana State University Law Center

== Activism ==
- Sara Blackwell, 2002, employment rights advocate
- C. B. Forgotston, 1970 J.D., political activist and state government watchdog

== Judiciary ==
- James E. Bolin, 1937, Louisiana House of Representatives, United States District judge, Louisiana Second District Court of Appeal judge
- Henry Newton Brown Jr., chief judge of the Second Circuit Court of Appeal
- Roy Brun, state district court judge in Shreveport and Louisiana House of Representatives from Caddo Parish
- Paul G. Byron, United States District Court for the Middle District of Florida judge
- Marcus R. Clark, Louisiana Supreme Court justice
- Luther F. Cole, Louisiana Supreme Court associate justice and Louisiana House of Representatives
- Scott Crichton, 1980, judge of the Louisiana 1st Judicial District Court in Shreveport
- James L. Dennis, United States Court of Appeals for the Fifth Circuit judge
- Pike Hall Jr., 1953, associate justice of Louisiana Supreme Court
- S. Maurice Hicks Jr., United States district judge for the Western District of Louisiana, Shreveport Division
- Jefferson D. Hughes III, Louisiana Supreme Court associate justice
- Bernette Joshua Johnson, Louisiana Supreme Court chief justice
- Catherine D. Kimball, 1970, chief justice of the Louisiana Supreme Court
- Fred S. LeBlanc, 1920 L.L.B., United States District judge, mayor of Baton Rouge, and state attorney general
- Morris Lottinger Jr., 1965, chief judge of the Louisiana First Circuit Court of Appeal and Louisiana House of Representatives
- Jay McCallum, 1985, Louisiana House of Representatives for Lincoln and Union parishes and Louisiana 3rd Judicial District Court judge
- John Victor Parker, 1952, United States District judge for the Middle District of Louisiana
- Roy S. Payne, 1977, U.S. magistrate judge of the U.S. District Court for the Eastern District of Texas and former U.S. magistrate judge of the U.S. District Court for the Western District of Louisiana
- G. Thomas Porteous, United States District judge
- Alvin Benjamin Rubin, 1942, federal judge
- Tom Stagg, United States District judge
- Lloyd George Teekell, 1951, judge of the 9th Judicial District Court and Louisiana House of Representatives from Rapides Parish
- Ralph E. Tyson, United States District Court for the Middle District of Louisiana chief judge
- Donald Ellsworth Walter, 1964, U.S. district judge for the United States District Court for the Western District of Louisiana

== Law ==
- Ossie Brown, former East Baton Rouge Parish district attorney
- Jefferson D. Hughes III, attorney general of Louisiana 1956–1972
- J. Minos Simon, 1946, attorney and legal author in Lafayette, Louisiana
- Kurt Wall, United States attorney for the United States District Court for the Middle District of Louisiana

== Politics ==
=== Governors ===
- Edwin Washington Edwards, governor of Louisiana 1972–1980, 1984–2988, and 1992–2996
- John Bel Edwards, 1999, governor of Louisiana 2016–2024, and Louisiana House of Representatives 2008–2015
- Sam H. Jones, governor of Louisiana 1940–1944
- Robert F. Kennon, governor of Louisiana 1952–1956
- John McKeithen, governor of Louisiana 1964–1972
- Ruffin Pleasant, governor of Louisiana 1916–1920

=== Federal legislators ===
- John Breaux, United States senator from Louisiana
- Overton Brooks, 1923, United States representative from Louisiana's 4th congressional district
- Patrick T. Caffery, 1956, United States representative and Louisiana House of Representatives
- Cleveland Dear, United States representative and state judicial district court judge
- Mike Johnson, 1998, 56th speaker of the U.S. House of Representatives, United States representative and Louisiana House of Representatives
- J. Bennett Johnston, Jr., United States senator, Louisiana House of Representatives, and Louisiana State Senate
- Buddy Leach, United States representative and chairman of the Louisiana Democratic Party
- Gillis W. Long, United States representative
- Russell B. Long, United States senator from Louisiana
- Speedy Long, United States representative
- Jim McCrery, United States representative from Louisiana's 4th congressional district
- William Henson Moore, United States representative and White House deputy chief of staff
- Wilbert Joseph "Billy" Tauzin, Jr., United States representative

=== State politicians ===
- Carl W. Bauer, Louisiana House of Representatives and Louisiana State Senate from St. Mary Parish
- James E. Bolin, 1937, Louisiana House of Representatives, 26th Judicial District Court judge, and Louisiana Second District Court of Appeal judge
- Chris Broadwater, 2002, Louisiana House of Representatives from Tangipahoa Parish
- Robby Carter, Louisiana House of Representatives from Greensburg, Louisiana
- Joe T. Cawthorn, 1932, Louisiana State Senate from DeSoto and Caddo parishes
- Jackson B. Davis, 1940, Louisiana State Senate from Caddo Parish
- C. H. "Sammy" Downs, 1946, Louisiana State Senate
- Gil Dozier, Louisiana commissioner of Agriculture and Forestry
- Frank Burton Ellis, 1929 L.L.B., Louisiana State Senate and federal judge
- James R. Eubank, 1958, Louisiana House of Representatives
- Jimmy Field, 1966, member of the Louisiana Public Service Commission
- Mike Futrell, 1985, J.D., Louisiana House of Representatives
- Ryan Gatti, Louisiana State Senate
- Rufus D. Hayes, insurance commissioner of Louisiana
- Eddie J. Lambert, 1982 J.D., Louisiana House of Representatives from Ascension Parish
- Nicholas Lorusso, 1992, Louisiana House of Representatives from Orleans Parish
- Morris Lottinger Jr., 1965, Louisiana House of Representatives and chief judge of the Louisiana First Circuit Court of Appeal
- Jay McCallum, 1985, Louisiana House of Representatives for Lincoln and Union parishes and judge of the Louisiana 3rd Judicial District Court
- Eugene McGehee, Louisiana House of Representatives for Lincoln and Union parishes and state district court judge in East Baton Rouge Parish
- Gregory A. Miller, 1988, Louisiana House of Representatives for Lincoln and Union parishes from St. Charles Parish
- Jay Morris, 1983, Louisiana House of Representatives from Ouachita and Morehouse parishes
- Mike Powell, 1992, Louisiana House of Representatives for Caddo and Bossier parishes
- Randy Roach, 1976, Louisiana House of Representatives and mayor of his native Lake Charles
- Mike Schofield, Texas House of Representatives from Harris County
- Alan Seabaugh, 1993, Louisiana House of Representatives from Shreveport
- Henry Clay Sevier, Louisiana House of Representatives from Madison Parish
- Frank P. Simoneaux, Louisiana House of Representatives
- Lloyd George Teekell, 1951, Louisiana House of Representatives from Rapides Parish and a judge of the 9th Judicial District Court
- Lloyd F. Wheat, Louisiana House of Representatives
- J. Robert Wooley, 1977, Louisiana commissioner of insurance 2000–2006

=== Other ===
- James Carville, political consultant, commentator and pundit
