= 2025 United States judicial elections =

United States judicial elections were held in 2025, in various states across the country, for both supreme courts and appellate courts. Justices are elected across the country in partisan, nonpartisan, and retention elections.

== Race summaries ==
=== Nonpartisan elections ===
==== Washington ====
Position	Incumbent	First elected	Status	Candidates
Court of Appeals Division I	Vacant	—N/a	Previous incumbent Stephen Dwyer left office on April 1, 2025. New member elected November 4, 2025.	✓ Tam Bui 52.7%; Karen Moore 47.0%
Court of Appeals Division III	Megan Murphy	2025 (Note: Appointed by Governor Jay Inslee)	Incumbent re-elected November 4, 2025.	✓ Megan Murphy

==== Wisconsin ====
Position	Incumbent	First elected	Status	Candidates
Supreme Court	Ann Walsh Bradley	1995	Incumbent retired. New member elected April 1, 2025.	✓ Susan Crawford 55.0%; Brad Schimel 45.0%
Court of Appeals District II	Mark Gundrum	2011 (Note: Appointed by Governor Scott Walker)	Incumbent re-elected April 1, 2025.	✓ Mark Gundrum
Court of Appeals District III	Lisa K. Stark	2013	Incumbent re-elected April 1, 2025.	✓ Lisa K. Stark
Court of Appeals District IV	Jennifer E. Nashold	2019	Incumbent re-elected April 1, 2025.	✓ Jennifer E. Nashold

=== Partisan elections ===
==== Louisiana ====
Position	Incumbent	Party	First elected	Status	Candidates
Supreme Court District 3	James T. Genovese	Republican	2016	Incumbent resigned July 18, 2024, to become president of Northwestern State University. New member elected outright after the March 29, 2025, general election was cancelled. Republican hold.	▌ ✓ Cade Cole (Republican)
Court of Appeals First Circuit	John Guidry	Democratic	1997	Incumbent resigned January 1, 2025, after being elected to the Louisiana Supreme Court. New member elected outright after the March 29, 2025, general election was cancelled. Democratic hold.	▌ ✓ Wilson E. Fields (Democratic)

==== Pennsylvania ====
Position	Incumbent	Party	First elected	Status	Candidates
Commonwealth Court	Vacant	—N/a	—N/a	Office vacant after former Democratic incumbent Ellen Ceisler retired in December 2024. New member elected November 4, 2025. Democratic hold.	▌ ✓ Stella Tsai (Democratic) 56.7%; ▌ Matthew Wolford (Republican) 43.3%
Superior Court	Vacant	—N/a	—N/a	Office vacant after former Democratic incumbent Daniel McCaffery was elected to the Supreme Court of Pennsylvania in 2023. New member elected November 4, 2025. Democratic hold.	▌ ✓ Brandon Neuman (Democratic) 55.9%; ▌ Maria Battista (Republican) 42.1%; ▌ Dan Wassmer (Liberal) 2.0%

=== Retention elections ===
==== Pennsylvania ====
Position	Incumbent	Party	First elected	Status	Vote
Supreme Court	Christine Donohue	Democratic	2015	Incumbent retained in retention vote held November 4, 2025.	✓ Yes 61.8%; No 38.2%
Supreme Court	Kevin Dougherty	Democratic	2015	Incumbent retained in retention vote held November 4, 2025.	✓ Yes 61.8%; No 38.2%
Supreme Court	David Wecht	Democratic	2015	Incumbent retained in retention vote held November 4, 2025.	✓ Yes 61.5%; No 38.5%
Commonwealth Court	Michael H. Wojcik	Democratic	2015	Incumbent retained in retention vote held November 4, 2025.	✓ Yes 62.0%; No 38.0%
Superior Court	Alice Beck Dubow	Democratic	2015	Incumbent retained in retention vote held November 4, 2025.	✓ Yes 62.4%; No 37.6%

The table below lists the current justices of the Pennsylvania Supreme Court, their political party, and when they assumed office.

Office	Name	Party	Date assumed office
Pennsylvania Supreme Court	Kevin Brobson	Republican	January 3, 2022
Pennsylvania Supreme Court	Christine Donohue	Democratic	January 8, 2016
Pennsylvania Supreme Court	Kevin M. Dougherty	Democratic	January 5, 2016
Pennsylvania Supreme Court	Daniel D. McCaffery	Democratic	January 2, 2024
Pennsylvania Supreme Court	Sallie Mundy	Republican	2016
Pennsylvania Supreme Court	Debra Todd	Democratic	2008
Pennsylvania Supreme Court	David Wecht	Democratic	January 7, 2016
