= 2020 Louisiana elections =

A general election was held in the U.S. state of Louisiana on November 3, 2020. To vote by mail, registered Louisiana voters had to request a ballot by October 30, 2020.

== State offices ==
=== Louisiana Public Service Commission ===
Two seats in the Louisiana Public Service Commission were up for election for a six-year term.

==== District 1 ====
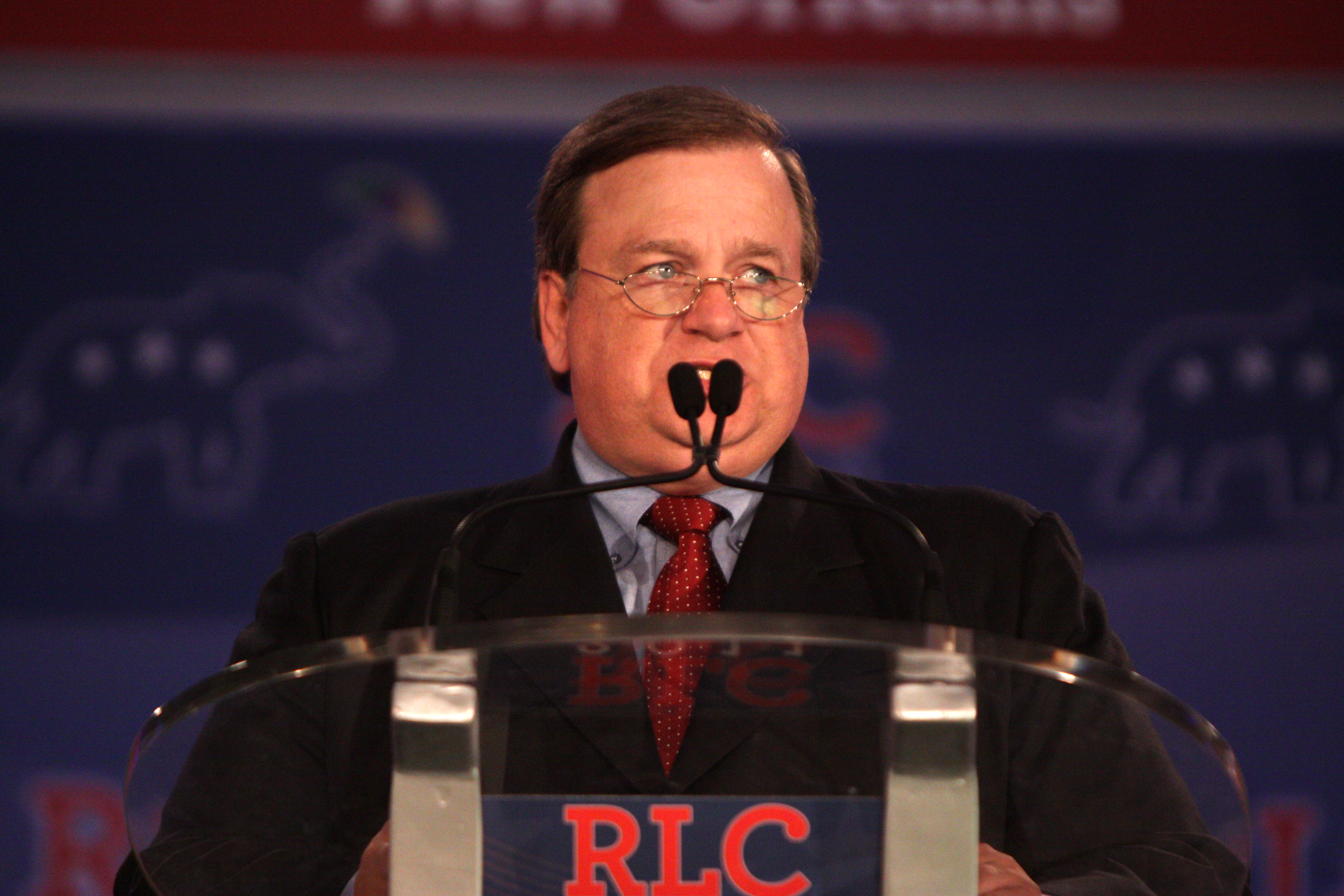
Eric Skrmetta

Louisiana Public Service Commission District 1, primary election
Party	Candidate	Votes	%
Republican	Eric Skrmetta (incumbent)	134,900	31.30
Democratic	Allen Borne Jr.	107,174	24.87
Republican	J. Kevin Pearson	60,189	13.96
Republican	John Mason	57,652	13.38
Republican	Richard Sanderson II	35,502	8.24
Independent	John Schwegmann	23,707	5.50
Green	William Boartfield Jr.	11,890	2.76
Total votes		431,014	100.0

Louisiana Public Service Commission District 1, general election
Party	Candidate	Votes	%
Republican	Eric Skrmetta (incumbent)	55,987	61.78
Democratic	Allen Borne Jr.	34,639	38.22
Total votes		90,626	100.0
Republican hold			

==== District 5 ====
Louisiana Public Service Commissioner District 5 election, 2020
Nominee	Foster Campbell	Shane Smiley
Party	Democratic	Republican
Popular vote	198,033	177,228
Percentage	52.77%	47.23%
- Parish results: Campbell: 50-60% 60-70% 70-80% Smiley: 50-60% 60-70%
5th District Commissioner before election
Foster Campbell
Democratic
Elected 5th District Commissioner
Foster Campbell
Democratic

Since a candidate won more than half of the votes in the primary, no general runoff was held.

Louisiana Public Service Commission District 5, primary election
Party	Candidate	Votes	%
Democratic	Foster Campbell (incumbent)	198,033	52.77
Republican	Shane Smiley	177,228	47.23
Total votes		375,261	100.0
Democratic hold			

=== Louisiana House of Representatives (special) ===
A special election was held for District 54 of the Louisiana House of Representatives due to the death of incumbent Reggie Bagala.

Louisiana House of Representatives District 54 special, primary election
Party	Candidate	Votes	%
Republican	Joseph Orgeron	4,040	54.55
Republican	James Cantrelle	1,450	19.58
Republican	Donny Lerille	808	10.91
Republican	Kevin Duet	691	9.33
Republican	Phil Gilligan	242	3.27
Republican	Dave Carskadon	175	2.36
Total votes		7,406	100.0
Republican hold			

=== Louisiana Supreme Court ===
Two seats in the Louisiana Supreme Court were up for election.

==== District 4 ====
A special election was held for District 4 due to the retirement of incumbent justice Marcus R. Clark.

Louisiana Supreme Court District 4 special, primary election
Party	Candidate	Votes	%
Republican	Jay McCallum	122,458	56.69
Republican	Shannon Gremillion	93,569	43.31
Total votes		216,027	100.0
Republican hold			

==== District 7 ====
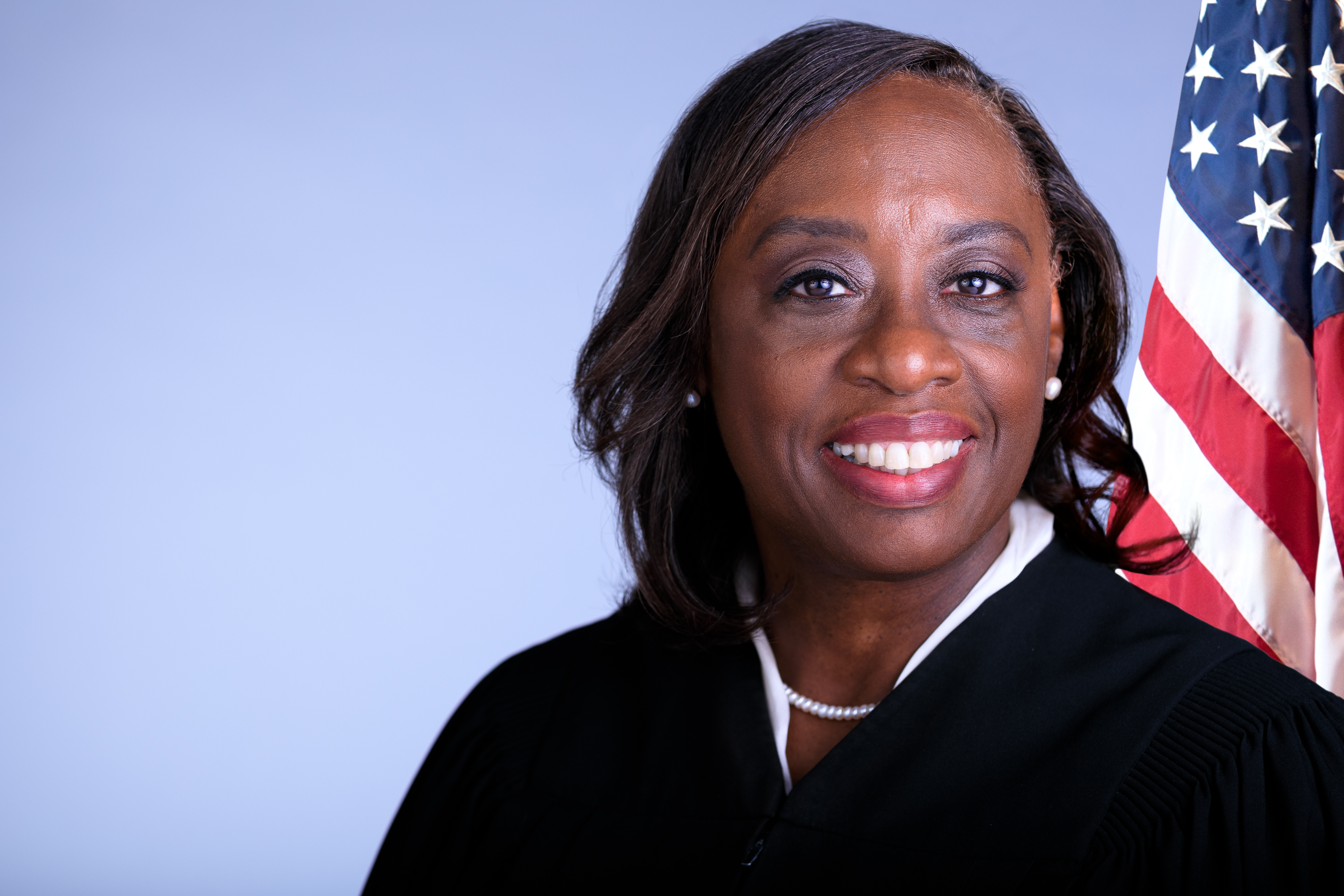
Piper Griffin

On November 6, 2020, Terri Love withdrew from the race. Therefore, no general runoff was held.

Louisiana Supreme Court District 7, primary election
Party	Candidate	Votes	%
Democratic	Piper Griffin	78,603	43.93
Democratic	Terri Love	56,387	31.51
Democratic	Sandra Cabrina Jenkins	43,949	24.56
Total votes		178,939	100.0
Democratic hold			

== Federal offices ==
=== President and vice president of the United States ===
Louisiana had eight electoral votes in the Electoral College. Republican Donald Trump won all of them with 58% of the popular vote.

=== U.S. House of Representatives ===
All of Louisiana's six representatives in the United States House of Representatives were up for election. Republicans won five seats while Democrats won one seat. No seats changed hands.

=== U.S. Senate ===
Republican Bill Cassidy was re-elected.

== Ballot measures ==
=== Amendment 1 (November) ===
No Right to Abortion in Constitution Amendment
- November 3, 2020
- Do you support an amendment declaring that, to protect human life, a right to abortion and the funding of abortion shall not be found in the Louisiana Constitution? (Adds Article I, Section 20.1)

Results
Choice	Votes	%
Yes	1,274,167	62.06%
No	779,005	37.94%
Total votes	2,053,172	100.00%
Yes
80–90%
70–80%
60–70%
50–60%
No
70–80%
50–60%
Results by county

Louisiana Amendment 1, the No Right to Abortion in Constitution Amendment of 2020, passed with a yes vote of 62.06%. It explicitly adds language that denies a person's right to abortion. It adds the following language to the state constitution:

nothing in this constitution shall be construed to secure or protect a right to abortion or require the funding of abortion.

— Louisiana Legislature, Amendment 1, State Constitution

Amendment 1 (November)
Choice	Votes	%
For	1,274,167	62.06
Against	779,005	37.94
Total	2,053,172	100.00

=== Amendment 2 ===
Amendment 2 results by parish Yes: 70–80%; 60–70%; 50–60%; No: 50–60%

Amendment 2
Choice	Votes	%
For	1,158,766	58.34
Against	827,516	41.66
Total	1,986,282	100.00

=== Amendment 3 ===
Amendment 3 results by parish Yes: 70–80%; 60–70%; 50–60%; No: 50–60%

Amendment 3
Choice	Votes	%
For	1,097,196	55.34
Against	885,304	44.66
Total	1,982,500	100.00

=== Amendment 4 ===
Amendment 4 results by parish No: 70–80%; 60–70%; 50–60%; Yes: 60–70%; 50–60%

Amendment 4
Choice	Votes	%
For	856,559	44.24
Against	1,079,618	55.76
Total	1,936,177	100.00

=== Amendment 5 ===
Amendment 5 results by parish No: 70–80%; 60–70%; 50–60%

Amendment 5
Choice	Votes	%
For	727,372	37.33
Against	1,221,254	62.67
Total	1,948,626	100.00

=== Amendment 6 ===
Amendment 6 results by parish Yes: 70–80%; 60–70%; 50–60%

Amendment 6
Choice	Votes	%
For	1,225,682	62.16
Against	746,021	37.84
Total	1,971,703	100.00

=== Amendment 7 ===
Amendment 7 results by parish Yes: 70–80%; 60–70%; 50–60%

Amendment 7
Choice	Votes	%
For	1,267,414	64.32
Against	702,930	35.68
Total	1,970,344	100.00

=== Amendment 1 (December) ===
December Amendment 1 results by parish No: 90–100%; 80–90%; 70–80%; 60–70%

Amendment 1 (December)
Choice	Votes	%
For	118,651	23.53
Against	385,647	76.47
Total	504,298	100.00

== See also ==
- Elections in Louisiana
- Politics of Louisiana
- Political party strength in Louisiana
