= Bergeron v. Bergeron =

- Court: Louisiana Supreme Court
- Full case name: Marie Louise Bonner Bergeron v. Burke Anthony Bergeron, Jr.
- Decided: August 19, 1986
- Citation: 492 So.2d 1193

Court membership
- Judges sitting: John Allen Dixon Jr., Pascal F. Calogero Jr., Walter F. Marcus Jr., James L. Dennis, Jack C. Watson, Harry T. Lemmon, Fred A. Blanche Jr. (Note: Sitting in place of Justice Luther F. Cole)

Case opinions
- Decision by: Dennis
- Concurrence: Blanche

Keywords
- Burden of proof; Child custody; Family law

Bergeron v. Bergeron, 492 So.2d 1193 (1986), is a landmark child custody case decided by the Louisiana Supreme Court. In the dispute, the Louisiana Supreme Court held that, in order to modify a custody dispute that has previously been a considered decree, the person seeking the modification bears a heavy burden of proving that the current custody is so deleterious to the child as to warrant its modification, or by clear and convincing evidence that the benefits of the change outweigh the damages that will be done to the child.
