= 2025 Louisiana judicial elections =

Supreme Court district map since May 2024

Judicial elections were held in the state of Louisiana to select several state and local judges in 2025. Judicial elections in the state are partisan. A special primary election was scheduled for March 29, 2025, for one vacancy each on the Louisiana Supreme Court and the Louisiana Circuit Courts of Appeals, but only one candidate contested each election. A runoff election would have taken place on May 3, 2025, in the even multiple candidates had filed and none had received a majority in the primary.

== Supreme Court District 3 special election ==
2025 Louisiana Supreme Court District 3 special election
- March 29, 2025 (cancelled)
Candidate	Cade Cole
Party	Republican
Popular vote	Unopposed
Justice before election
Vacant
James Genovese until August 4, 2024
Republican
Elected Justice
Cade Cole
Republican

A primary election to fill the third seat on the Louisiana Supreme Court was scheduled for March 29, 2025, with a general election to follow on May 3, 2025, in the event no candidate received a majority. The 3rd district was vacated by Republican James Genovese on August 4, 2024, after being selected to become president of the Northwestern State University. Genovese was elected in 2016 with 50.91 percent of the vote in a two-way race against fellow Republican Marilyn Castle.

Prior to the election, the Louisiana Supreme Court consisted of three Republicans, two Democrats, one without a party affiliation, and one vacancy. Supreme Court justices serve 10-year terms.

=== Winner ===
Only one candidate, Republican Cade Cole, qualified for the ballot before the filing deadline, and won the seat by default.

2025 Louisiana Supreme Court District 3 special election
Party	Candidate	Primary March 29, 2025	General May 3, 2025
Republican	Cade Cole	Unopposed	Not held
Republican hold			

== Court of Appeals First Circuit special election ==
2025 Louisiana Court of Appeals First Circuit District 2 Subdistrict 2 Division D special election
- March 29, 2025 (cancelled)
Candidate	Wilson E. Fields
Party	Democratic
Popular vote	Unopposed
Judge before election
Vacant
John Guidry until December 31, 2024
Democratic
Elected Judge
Wilson E. Fields
Democratic

A primary election to fill the second district, subdistrict two, division D seat of the Louisiana Circuit Courts of Appeal was scheduled for March 29, 2025, with a general election to follow on May 3, 2025, in the event no candidate received a majority. The district is located entirely within East Baton Rouge Parish. The seat was vacated by Democrat John Guidry on December 31, 2024, after being elected Justice of the Supreme Court from the 2nd District. Guidry won this appeals court seat in 2020 unopposed.

Appeals judges serve 10-year terms.

=== Winner ===
Only one candidate, Democrat Wilson E. Fields, qualified for the ballot before the filing deadline, and won the seat by default. Fields, chief judge of the 19th Judicial District Court, is the brother of U.S. representative Cleo Fields.

2025 Louisiana Court of Appeals First Circuit District 2 Subdistrict 2 Division D special election
Party	Candidate	Primary March 29, 2025	General May 3, 2025
Democratic	Wilson E. Fields	Unopposed	Not held
Democratic hold			
