= Louisiana's 54th House of Representatives district =

American legislative district

Louisiana's 54th State House of Representatives district
Representative
Joseph Orgeron; R–Cut Off

Louisiana's 54th House of Representatives district is one of 105 Louisiana House of Representatives districts. It is currently represented by Republican Joseph Orgeron of Cut Off.

== Geography ==
HD54 is made up of a large part of Lafourche Parish. This includes the communities of Galliano, Golden Meadow, Larose and Lockport.

== Election results ==
Year	Winning candidate	Party	Percent	Opponent	Party	Percent	Opponent	Party	Percent	Opponent	Party	Percent	Opponent	Party	Percent	Opponent	Party	Percent
2011	Jerry Gisclair	Democratic	58.6%	Micah Hebert	Independent	41.4%												
2015	Jerry Gisclair	Democratic	100%															
2019	Reggie Bagala	Republican	58.2%	Donny Lerille	Republican	26.1%	Ernest Boudreaux	Republican	15.7%									
2020 (special)	Joseph Orgeron	Republican	54.6%	James Cantrelle	Republican	19.6%	Donny Lerille	Republican	10.9%	Kevin Duet	Republican	9.3%	Phil Gilligan	Republican	3.3%	Dave Carskadon	Republican	2.4%
2023	Joseph Orgeron	Republican	Cancelled															
