= Ventress, Louisiana =

Ventress
- Census-designated place
- Location of Ventress in Louisiana
- Coordinates: 30°40′57″N 91°25′29″W
- Country: United States
- State: Louisiana
- Parish: Pointe Coupee

Area
  - Total: 2.82 sq mi (7.31 km^{2})
  - Land: 2.03 sq mi (5.25 km^{2})
  - Water: 0.80 sq mi (2.06 km^{2})
- Elevation: 13 ft (4.0 m)

Population (2020)
  - Total: 800
  - Density: 394.5/sq mi (152.33/km^{2})
- Time zone: UTC-6 (CST)
  - Summer (DST): UTC-5 (CDT)
- ZIP code: 70783
- Area code: 225
- GNIS feature ID: 2586715
- FIPS code: 22-78050

Ventress is a census-designated place located in Pointe Coupee Parish, Louisiana, United States, along the northeastern end of the False River. As of the 2020 census, Ventress had a population of 800. It is home to the Hunter Fabre Post 248 American Legion Hall on Legion Road (Louisiana Highway 413).

== Demographics ==
Historical population
Census	Pop.	Note	%±
2010	890		—
2020	800		−10.1%
U.S. Decennial Census

Ventress first appeared as a census designated place in the 2010 U.S. census. As of 2020, its population was 800.

== Notable people ==
- J. E. Jumonville Jr., former member of the Louisiana State Senate, rancher, and horse breeder
- Catherine D. Kimball, former chief justice of the Louisiana Supreme Court
- Clyde Kimball, member of the Louisiana House of Representatives for Pointe Coupee and West Baton Rouge parishes, 1976–1992
- Patrick Queen, NFL linebacker for the Pittsburgh Steelers
- Ventruss, Metalcore band formed in Ventress

== Major highways ==
- Louisiana Highway 413
- Louisiana Highway 414
- Louisiana Highway 415
