= Jeffrey P. Victory =

American judge (1946–2024)

Judge of the Louisiana Court Appeal for the Second Circuit
- In office 1991–1995

Associate Justice of the Louisiana Supreme Court
- In office January 1, 1995 – December 31, 2014
- Preceded by: Pike Hall Jr.
- Succeeded by: Scott Crichton

Personal details
- Born: Jeffrey Paul Victory; January 29, 1946 Shreveport, Louisiana, U.S.
- Died: September 26, 2024 (aged 78)
- Party: Democratic; Republican
- Spouse: Nancy Clark
- Children: 4
- Education: Centenary College of Louisiana; Tulane University Law School
- Occupation: Judge

Jeffrey Paul Victory (January 29, 1946 – September 26, 2024) was an American judge. A member of the Democratic Party and the Republican Party, he served as judge of the Louisiana Court Appeal for the Second Circuit from 1991 to 1995 and as an associate justice of the Louisiana Supreme Court from 1995 to 2014.

== Life and career ==
Victory was born in Shreveport, Louisiana, the son of Thomas Edward Victory and Currie Esther Horton. He attended and graduated from C. E. Byrd High School. After graduating, he attended Centenary College of Louisiana on an athletic scholarship, earning his BA degree in history and government in 1967. He also attended Tulane University Law School, graduating in 1971. While attending Tulane, he served in the Louisiana National Guard.

Victory served as judge of the Louisiana Court Appeal for the Second Circuit from 1991 to 1995. After his service as judge, he served as an associate justice of the Louisiana Supreme Court from 1995 to 2014.

== Personal life and death ==
Victory was married to Nancy Clark. Their marriage ended until Victory's death in 2024.

Victory died on September 26, 2024, at the age of 78.
