= Jeannette Knoll =

American judge

Alicia Jeannette Theriot Knoll

Associate Justice of the Louisiana Supreme Court (Place 3)
- In office January 1, 1997 – December 31, 2016
- Preceded by: Jack C. Watson
- Succeeded by: James T. Genovese

Judge of the Louisiana 3rd Circuit Court of Appeal, First District, Division A
- In office January 1, 1983 – December 31, 1996
- Succeeded by: Elizabeth Pickett

Personal details
- Born: January 23, 1943 (age 83) Baton Rouge, Louisiana, U.S.
- Party: Democratic
- Spouse(s): Jerold Edward "Eddie" Knoll, Sr.
- Children: Triston Kane Knoll (deceased) Jerold E. Knoll, Jr. Edmond "Sonny" Humphries Knoll; Blake Theriot Knoll Jonathan Paul Knoll
- Education: St. James Major High School
- Alma mater: Loyola University New Orleans; Loyola University New Orleans College of Law; University of Virginia School of Law
- Occupation: judge, lawyer

Alicia Jeannette Theriot Knoll (born January 23, 1943) is a former member of the Louisiana Supreme Court.

Knoll announced that she would retire at the end of 2016 rather than seek re-election. She was succeeded by James T. Genovese (born August 1949), who defeated Republican Marilyn C. Castle, 133,369 votes (51%) to 128,598 (49%), in the primary election held on November 8, 2016. This was the same day as the presidential balloting. The Louisiana Secretary of State lists Genovese as a Republican on its election returns, but as a registered Independent on the voter portal. He may have switched registration after his election, or one of the party labels may be incorrect. She filled the vacancy on the Louisiana Supreme Court due to the early retirement of Justice Genovese until newly elected Justice Cade R. Cole could take office. Cole was once Knoll's law clerk and she swore him into office in 2025.

== Background ==
A native of Baton Rouge, Alicia, known as Jeannette, is one of 10 children of Alfred Joseph Theriot and the former Marie Bailey. Reared in Gueydan in Vermilion Parish in southwestern Louisiana, she moved with her family to New Orleans, where she graduated from St. James Major High School.

In 1961, at the age of 18, Theriot won a scholarship from the New Orleans Opera Guild and the Metropolitan Opera Association to study voice at the Mannes College of Music in Greenwich Village in New York City. She continued to study music on a voice scholarship at Loyola University Music School in New Orleans. She was invited to be a guest soloist with the New Orleans Philharmonic Symphony and the New Orleans Summer Pops.

In 1966, she obtained a Bachelor of Arts degree in political science from the Roman Catholic-affiliated Loyola University in New Orleans. In 1969, she received the Juris Doctor from Loyola Law School. Much later, in 1996, as a circuit court judge, Knoll (who had married and changed her name) obtained a master of laws in the judicial process from the University of Virginia School of Law in Charlottesville, Virginia.

== Judicial career ==
In 1982, Knoll was elected to Louisiana Court of Appeal for the Third Circuit, First District, Division A, which encompassed eight parishes for a 10-year term. She defeated Alfred Ameen Mansour (1925-2010) of Alexandria, fellow Democrat and state court judge, winning with 34,562 votes (53.4 percent) to 30,124 (46.6 percent). Mansour won his home parish, Rapides by 7,000 votes.

In 1992, Knoll won all eight parishes to gain her second 10-year term on the appeals court. She defeated the Edward Larvadain, Jr., an African-American attorney from Alexandria, with 47,581 votes (81%) to 11,165 (19%).

On September 21, 1996, Knoll was elected to the Louisiana Supreme Court seat for the Third District, which encompassed all or parts of 11 parishes. She defeated fellow Democrat Jack Crozier Watson, a lawyer from Lake Charles, 102,560 (54.7%) to 84,861 (45.3%) and won by a three-to-one margin in Avoyelles Parish. She joined the Supreme Court on January 1, 1997. In 2006, Knoll was unopposed for her second and final 10-year term on the high court.

From 1972 to 1982, Knoll had been the first assistant district attorney for the 12th Judicial District Court in Marksville. Her husband, Jerold Edward "Eddie" Knoll, Sr. (born 1941), son of the late Edmond Knoll and the former Myrtle Humphries of Simmesport in Avoyelles Parish, a Democrat, was elected in 1976 as the 32nd district attorney for the 12th District, serving from 1977 to 2003. Earlier, Jeannette Knoll had served as the public defender for indigent cases in Avoyelles Parish. She also represented pro bono the Selective Service System board in Marksville.

Knoll was an instructor for the Louisiana Judicial College and a past president of the Business and Professional Women's Foundation. In 1995 and 2002, she received the Outstanding Judicial Award from the crime-fighting interest group, Victims and Citizens Against Crime, Inc. Still another group, Louisiana Crimefighters, named her "Outstanding Jurist of the Year".

Jeannette and Eddie Knoll have four living sons. Their oldest son, Triston Kane Knoll (1971-2011), practiced law in Marksville with his father and brothers until his death in Alexandria, at the age of 39. He was inducted in 2007 into the Louisiana Justice Hall of Fame.

In 2000, Knoll was inducted into the Louisiana Political Museum and Hall of Fame in Winnfield. Former Chief Justice Catherine D. Kimball was inducted in 2011.
