= 2020 United States presidential election in Louisiana =

- November 3, 2020
- Turnout: 69.49% ▲

Nominee	Donald Trump	Joe Biden
Party	Republican	Democratic
Home state	Florida	Delaware
Running mate	Mike Pence	Kamala Harris
Electoral vote	8	0
Popular vote	1,255,776	856,034
Percentage	58.46%	39.85%

Trump
40–50%
50–60%
60–70%
70–80%
80–90%
90–100%
Biden
40–50%
50–60%
60–70%
70–80%
80–90%
90–100%
Tie/No Vote
President before election
Donald Trump
Republican
Elected President
Joe Biden
Democratic

The 2020 United States presidential election in Louisiana was held on Tuesday, November 3, 2020, as part of the 2020 United States presidential election in which all 50 states plus the District of Columbia participated. Louisiana voters chose electors to represent them in the Electoral College via a popular vote, pitting the Republican Party's nominee, incumbent President Donald Trump, and running mate Vice President Mike Pence against Democratic Party nominee, former Vice President Joe Biden, and his running mate California Senator Kamala Harris. Louisiana has eight electoral votes in the Electoral College.

Trump won Louisiana on the day of the election 58.5% to 39.9%, a margin of 18.6%, down from 19.4% in 2016. Per exit polls by the Associated Press, his strength in Louisiana came from White born-again/Evangelical Christians as well as conservative Roman Catholics who have a high population in Louisiana, who supported Trump with 91% and 80% of their vote. On the issue of abortion, 57% of voters believed abortion should be illegal in most or all cases. As is the case in most southern states, there was a stark racial divide in voting for this election: Whites supported Trump by 77%–22% while African Americans supported Biden by 88%–10%.

== Primary elections ==
The primary elections were originally scheduled for April 4, 2020. On March 13, they were moved to June 20 due to concerns over the COVID-19 pandemic. Then on April 14, they were further pushed back to July 11.

=== Republican primary ===
Incumbent President Donald Trump was essentially uncontested in the Republican primary. The state has 46 delegates to the 2020 Republican National Convention.

=== Democratic primary ===
2020 Louisiana Democratic presidential primary
Candidate	Votes	%	Delegates
Joe Biden	212,555	79.52	54
Bernie Sanders (withdrawn)	19,859	7.43	
Elizabeth Warren (withdrawn)	6,426	2.40	
Michael Bennet (withdrawn)	6,173	2.31	
Andrew Yang (withdrawn)	4,617	1.73	
Michael Bloomberg (withdrawn)	4,312	1.61	
Amy Klobuchar (withdrawn)	2,431	0.91	
Pete Buttigieg (withdrawn)	2,363	0.88	
Tulsi Gabbard (withdrawn)	1,962	0.73	
John Delaney (withdrawn)	1,877	0.70	
Tom Steyer (withdrawn)	902	0.34	
Deval Patrick (withdrawn)	877	0.33	
Other candidates	2,932	1.10	
Total	267,286	100%	54

== General election ==
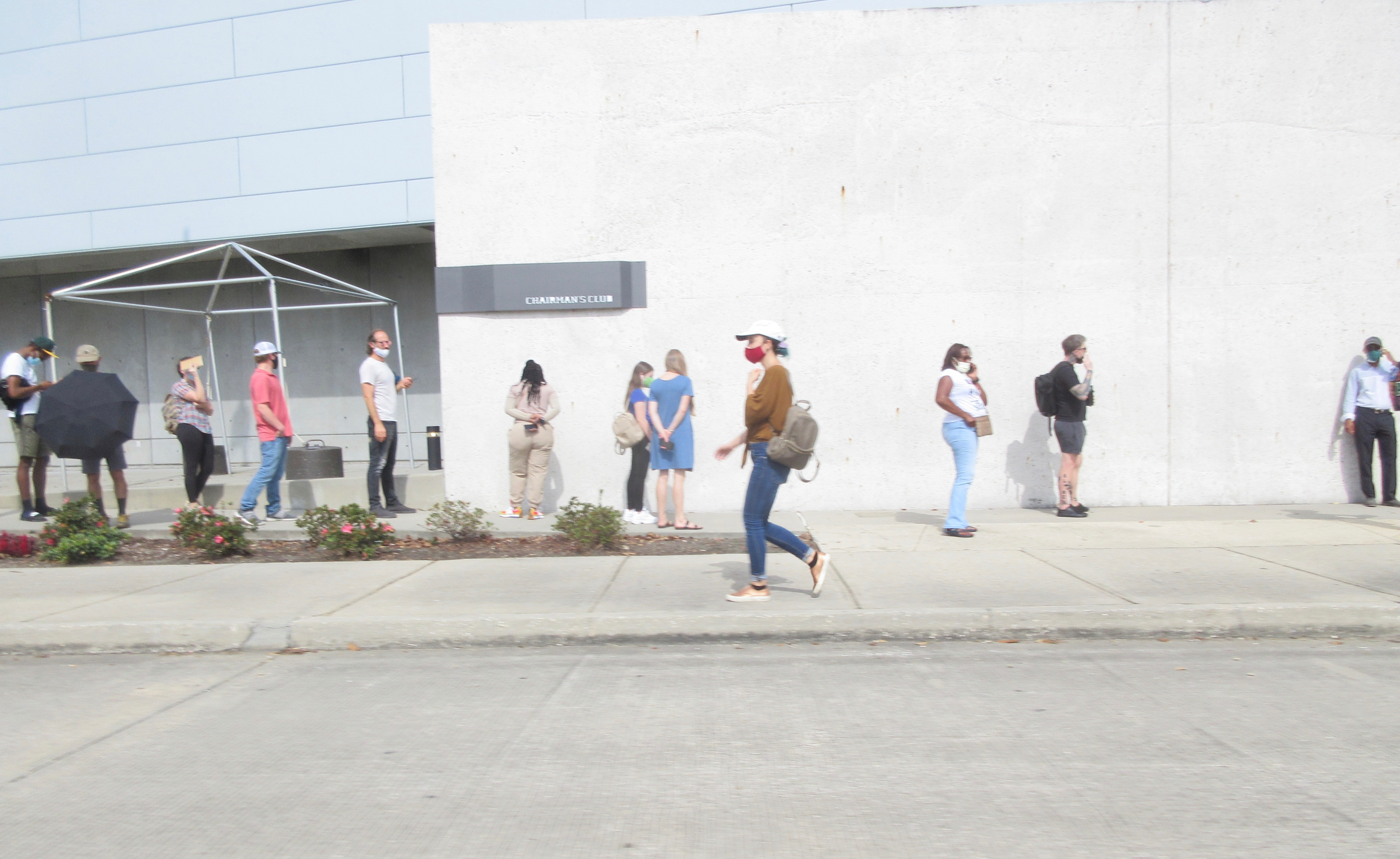
COVID-19 pandemic social-distanced queue for early voting at New Orleans Arena, 27 October 2020

=== Predictions ===
Source	Ranking	As of
The Cook Political Report	Safe R	September 10, 2020
Inside Elections	Safe R	September 4, 2020
Sabato's Crystal Ball	Safe R	July 14, 2020
Politico	Safe R	September 8, 2020
RCP	Likely R	August 3, 2020
Niskanen	Safe R	July 26, 2020
CNN	Safe R	August 3, 2020
The Economist	Safe R	September 23, 2020
CBS News	Likely R	August 16, 2020
270towin	Safe R	August 2, 2020
ABC News	Safe R	July 31, 2020
NPR	Likely R	August 3, 2020
NBC News	Likely R	August 6, 2020
538	Safe R	November 2, 2020

=== Polling ===
View source data.

==== Aggregate polls ====
Source of poll aggregation	Dates administered	Dates updated	Joe Biden Democratic	Donald Trump Republican	Other/ Undecided (Note: Calculated by taking the difference of 100% and all other candidates combined.)	Margin
270 to Win	October 14–27, 2020	November 3, 2020	36.0%	56.5%	7.5%	Trump +20.5
FiveThirtyEight	until November 2, 2020	November 3, 2020	37.1%	57.6%	5.3%	Trump +20.6
Average			36.6%	57.1%	6.4%	Trump +20.5

Polls

Poll source	Date(s) administered	Sample size (Note: Key: A – all adults RV – registered voters LV – likely voters V – unclear)	Margin of error	Donald Trump Republican	Joe Biden Democratic	Jo Jorgensen Libertarian	Howie Hawkins Green	Other	Undecided
SurveyMonkey/Axios	Oct 20 – Nov 2, 2020	1,556 (LV)	± 3.5%	62% (Note: Overlapping sample with the previous SurveyMonkey/Axios poll, but more information available regarding sample size)	36%	–	–	–	–
Swayable	Oct 23 – Nov 1, 2020	378 (LV)	± 6.7%	57%	39%	4%	–	–	–
SurveyMonkey/Axios	Oct 1–28, 2020	2,633 (LV)	–	60%	38%	–	–	–	–
University of New Orleans	Oct 22, 2020	755 (LV)	± 3.6%	59%	36%	–	–	4%	1%
Trafalgar Group	Oct 4–6, 2020	1,048 (LV)	± 2.95%	54%	36%	3%	–	1% (Note: "Another Party Candidate" with 1%)	6%
SurveyMonkey/Axios	Sep 1–30, 2020	2,475 (LV)	–	60%	38%	–	–	–	2%
Tyson Group/Consumer Energy Alliance (Note: The Consumer Energy Alliance is a pro-Keystone XL lobbying group)	Sep 2–5, 2020	600 (LV)	± 4%	48%	42%	2%	–	No voters (Note: "Refused" with no voters)	7%
SurveyMonkey/Axios	Aug 1–31, 2020	2,587 (LV)	–	59%	38%	–	–	–	2%
Trafalgar Group	Aug 13–17, 2020	1,002 (LV)	± 2.99%	54%	38%	3%	–	1%	4%
ALG Research/Perkins for LA (Note: Poll sponsored by Adrians Perkins' campaign in the 2020 United States Senate election in Louisiana)	Aug 6–12, 2020	800 (LV)	± 3.5%	50%	43%	–	–	–	7%
SurveyMonkey/Axios	Jul 1–31, 2020	2,998 (LV)	–	60%	39%	–	–	–	2%
SurveyMonkey/Axios	Jun 8–30, 2020	1,134 (LV)	–	60%	37%	–	–	–	3%

Hypothetical polling

with Donald Trump and Generic Opponent

Poll source	Date(s) administered	Sample size	Margin of error	Donald Trump (R)	Generic Opponent	Other	Undecided
Multi-Quest International/The Hay Ride	Jul 19–21, 2019	601 (RV)	± 4%	50%	39%	1% (Note: "Refused" with 1%)	10%
Market Research Insight	Apr 9–11, 2019	600 (LV)	± 4.1%	54%	37%	–	10%

with Generic Republican and Generic Democrat

Poll source	Date(s) administered	Sample size	Margin of error	Generic Republican	Generic Democrat
Fabrizio, Lee & Associates/LaPolitics	Aug 6–12, 2020	600 (RV)	± 3.5%	47%	43%

=== Results ===
2020 United States presidential election in Louisiana
Party	Candidate	Votes	%	±%
Republican	Donald Trump Mike Pence	1,255,776	58.46%	+0.46%
Democratic	Joe Biden Kamala Harris	856,034	39.85%	+1.45%
Libertarian	Jo Jorgensen Spike Cohen	21,645	1.01%	−0.89%
The Birthday Party	Kanye West Michelle Tidball	4,897	0.23%	N/A
American Solidarity	Brian Carroll Amar Patel	2,497	0.12%	N/A
Becoming One Nation	Jade Simmons Claudeliah Rose	1,626	0.08%	N/A
C.U.P.	President Boddie Eric Stoneham	1,125	0.05%	N/A
Socialism and Liberation	Gloria La Riva Sunil Freeman	987	0.05%	N/A
Constitution	Don Blankenship William Mohr	860	0.04%	N/A
Freedom and Prosperity	Brock Pierce Karla Ballard	749	0.03%	N/A
Life, Liberty, Constitution	Tom Hoefling Andy Prior	668	0.03%	N/A
Unity	Bill Hammons Eric Bodenstab	662	0.03%	N/A
Socialist Workers	Alyson Kennedy Malcolm Jarrett	536	0.02%	N/A
Total votes		2,148,062	100.00%	

==== By parish ====
Parish	Donald Trump Republican		Joe Biden Democratic		Various candidates Other parties		Margin		Total
Parish	#	%	#	%	#	%	#	%	Total
Acadia	22,596	79.49%	5,443	19.15%	386	1.36%	17,153	60.34%	28,425
Allen	7,574	77.21%	2,108	21.49%	128	1.30%	5,466	55.72%	9,810
Ascension	40,687	65.28%	20,399	32.73%	1,239	1.99%	20,288	32.55%	62,325
Assumption	7,271	64.72%	3,833	34.12%	131	1.16%	3,438	30.60%	11,235
Avoyelles	12,028	69.56%	4,979	28.79%	285	1.65%	7,049	40.77%	17,292
Beauregard	13,575	82.99%	2,542	15.54%	240	1.47%	11,033	67.45%	16,357
Bienville	3,891	55.19%	3,067	43.50%	92	1.31%	824	11.69%	7,050
Bossier	38,074	69.66%	15,662	28.66%	919	1.68%	22,412	41.00%	54,655
Caddo	48,021	45.77%	55,110	52.53%	1,781	1.70%	-7,089	-6.76%	104,912
Calcasieu	55,066	66.62%	25,982	31.43%	1,615	1.95%	29,084	35.19%	82,663
Caldwell	3,976	83.49%	745	15.64%	41	0.87%	3,231	67.85%	4,762
Cameron	3,671	90.89%	324	8.02%	44	1.09%	3,347	82.87%	4,039
Catahoula	3,541	72.89%	1,269	26.12%	48	0.99%	2,272	46.77%	4,858
Claiborne	3,770	57.29%	2,731	41.50%	79	1.21%	1,039	15.79%	6,580
Concordia	5,550	62.87%	3,177	35.99%	101	1.14%	2,373	26.88%	8,828
DeSoto	9,112	61.83%	5,457	37.03%	167	1.14%	3,655	24.80%	14,736
East Baton Rouge	88,420	42.47%	115,577	55.52%	4,185	2.01%	-27,157	-13.05%	208,182
East Carroll	1,080	35.57%	1,900	62.58%	56	1.85%	-820	-27.01%	3,036
East Feliciana	6,064	57.70%	4,280	40.73%	165	1.57%	1,784	16.97%	10,509
Evangeline	11,053	71.72%	4,158	26.98%	201	1.30%	6,895	44.74%	15,412
Franklin	6,970	71.71%	2,658	27.35%	92	0.94%	4,312	44.36%	9,720
Grant	8,117	86.42%	1,157	12.32%	118	1.26%	6,960	74.10%	9,392
Iberia	21,251	64.96%	11,027	33.71%	435	1.33%	10,224	31.25%	32,713
Iberville	7,893	47.21%	8,514	50.92%	312	1.87%	-621	-3.71%	16,719
Jackson	5,394	70.68%	2,143	28.08%	95	1.24%	3,251	42.60%	7,632
Jefferson	105,949	54.69%	84,477	43.60%	3,307	1.71%	21,472	11.09%	193,733
Jefferson Davis	11,423	76.97%	3,208	21.62%	210	1.41%	8,215	55.35%	14,841
Lafayette	72,519	63.32%	39,685	34.65%	2,317	2.03%	32,834	28.67%	114,521
Lafourche	36,024	79.37%	8,672	19.11%	692	1.52%	27,352	60.26%	45,388
LaSalle	6,378	90.12%	638	9.02%	61	0.86%	5,740	81.10%	7,077
Lincoln	11,311	58.68%	7,559	39.22%	405	2.10%	3,752	19.46%	19,275
Livingston	54,877	84.13%	9,249	14.18%	1,104	1.69%	45,628	69.95%	65,230
Madison	1,930	41.33%	2,654	56.83%	86	1.84%	-724	-15.50%	4,670
Morehouse	6,510	56.25%	4,946	42.73%	118	1.02%	1,564	13.52%	11,574
Natchitoches	9,358	56.53%	6,896	41.66%	300	1.81%	2,462	14.87%	16,554
Orleans	26,664	15.00%	147,854	83.15%	3,301	1.85%	-121,190	-68.15%	177,819
Ouachita	42,255	61.09%	25,913	37.46%	998	1.45%	16,342	23.63%	69,166
Plaquemines	7,412	67.30%	3,414	31.00%	188	1.70%	3,998	36.30%	11,014
Pointe Coupee	7,503	60.65%	4,683	37.85%	185	1.50%	2,820	22.80%	12,371
Rapides	38,347	65.14%	19,475	33.08%	1,043	1.78%	18,872	32.06%	58,865
Red River	2,413	58.40%	1,644	39.79%	75	1.81%	769	18.61%	4,132
Richland	6,607	66.47%	3,225	32.44%	108	1.09%	3,382	34.03%	9,940
Sabine	8,776	82.82%	1,731	16.34%	89	0.84%	7,045	66.48%	10,596
St. Bernard	11,179	63.34%	6,151	34.85%	320	1.81%	5,028	28.49%	17,650
St. Charles	18,233	63.94%	9,800	34.37%	484	1.69%	7,433	29.57%	28,517
St. Helena	2,714	44.07%	3,346	54.34%	98	1.59%	-632	-10.27%	6,158
St. James	5,954	47.29%	6,510	51.71%	126	1.00%	-556	-4.42%	12,590
St. John the Baptist	7,538	35.17%	13,582	63.37%	312	1.46%	-6,044	-28.20%	21,432
St. Landry	23,171	56.30%	17,372	42.21%	611	1.49%	5,799	14.09%	41,154
St. Martin	18,203	67.32%	8,439	31.21%	396	1.47%	9,764	36.11%	27,038
St. Mary	14,811	63.88%	8,055	34.74%	320	1.38%	6,766	29.14%	23,186
St. Tammany	99,666	71.13%	37,746	26.94%	2,698	1.93%	61,920	44.19%	140,110
Tangipahoa	37,806	65.57%	18,887	32.76%	968	1.67%	18,919	32.81%	57,661
Tensas	1,197	46.87%	1,329	52.04%	28	1.09%	-132	-5.17%	2,554
Terrebonne	34,339	74.26%	11,198	24.22%	703	1.52%	23,141	50.04%	46,240
Union	8,407	75.06%	2,654	23.69%	140	1.25%	5,753	51.37%	11,201
Vermilion	21,930	80.26%	5,009	18.33%	385	1.41%	16,921	61.93%	27,324
Vernon	14,107	81.69%	2,898	16.78%	263	1.53%	11,209	64.91%	17,268
Washington	13,307	68.20%	5,970	30.59%	236	1.21%	7,337	37.61%	19,513
Webster	11,830	64.94%	6,172	33.88%	214	1.18%	5,658	31.06%	18,216
West Baton Rouge	7,684	54.51%	6,200	43.98%	213	1.51%	1,484	10.53%	14,097
West Carroll	4,317	85.45%	710	14.05%	25	0.50%	3,607	71.40%	5,052
West Feliciana	3,863	61.63%	2,298	36.66%	107	1.71%	1,565	24.97%	6,268
Winn	4,619	74.20%	1,543	24.79%	63	1.01%	3,076	49.41%	6,225
Totals	1,255,776	58.46%	856,034	39.85%	36,252	1.69%	399,742	18.61%	2,148,062

==== By congressional district ====
Trump won five of the six congressional districts in Louisiana.

District	Trump	Biden	Representative
1st	68%	30%	Steve Scalise
2nd	23%	76%	Cedric Richmond
3rd	68%	30%	Clay Higgins
4th	61%	37%	Mike Johnson
5th	64%	34%	Ralph Abraham
6th	65%	33%	Garret Graves

== Notes ==
Partisan clients

== See also ==
- United States presidential elections in Louisiana
- Presidency of Joe Biden
- 2020 Louisiana elections
- 2020 United States presidential election
- 2020 Democratic Party presidential primaries
- 2020 Republican Party presidential primaries
- 2020 United States elections
