= Pascal F. Calogero Jr. =

American judge (1931–2018)

Pascal Frank Calogero Jr.

Louisiana Supreme Court Chief Justice
- In office January 1, 1973 – December 31, 2008
- Preceded by: Walter B. Hamlin
- Succeeded by: Catherine D. Kimball

Personal details
- Born: November 9, 1931 New Orleans, Louisiana, U.S.
- Died: December 20, 2018 (aged 87) New Orleans, Louisiana, U.S.
- Party: Democratic
- Spouse: Leslie M. Langhetee Calogero
- Children: 10
- Education: Brother Martin High School; Loyola University New Orleans; Loyola University New Orleans College of Law (JD); University of Virginia School of Law (LLM)
- Occupation: Judge; Attorney

Pascal Frank Calogero Jr. (November 9, 1931 – December 20, 2018) was the longest-serving Chief Justice of the Louisiana Supreme Court.

== Background ==
A native of New Orleans, Louisiana, Calogero attended C.J. Colton Grammar School and graduated in 1949 from the Roman Catholic Brother Martin High School, when that institution was still known as St. Aloysius High School. He held a variety of jobs while attending high school, played baseball on the championship team, and excelled academically. His father, Pascal Calogero, Sr., was a New Orleans police officer who encouraged his son to pursue a legal career. His mother, the former Louise Moore, was a homemaker. He secured a scholarship to Loyola University New Orleans for his pre-law studies and was initiated into the Alpha Delta Gamma national fraternity. He obtained his Juris Doctor in 1954 from Loyola University New Orleans School of Law, at which he was the president of the student editorial board of Loyola Law Review. Years later in 1992, he received a Master of Laws in judicial process from the University of Virginia at Charlottesville, Virginia.

== Career ==
Calogero served for three years in the United States Army as a military police officer and in the Judge Advocate General's Corps. He was briefly a law clerk for the Orleans Parish Civil District Court and from 1958 to 1972, was in the law firm of Landrieu, Calogero, and Kronlage. His senior partner was his fellow Democrat Moon Landrieu, the former mayor of New Orleans.

He was first elected to the Louisiana Supreme Court in 1972 and reelected in 1974, 1988, and 1998. He retired at the end of 2008, a record career of thirty-six years. While on the bench, he participated in more than six thousand oral arguments and published opinions. He personally authored more than one thousand majority opinions, concurrences, and dissents.

As Chief Justice, he oversaw the establishment of the Louisiana Indigent Defender Board, improvements to the juvenile court system, development of a new lawyer disciplinary code, the strengthening of the judicial disciplinary system, the adoption of strategic plans for the three-tiered court system, implementation of a uniform pay plan for the state appellate courts, and establishment of the Supreme Court's community relations department.

Calogero's most visible achievement is the renovation of the New Orleans Civil Court Building at Royal and Conti Streets in the French Quarter. Built in 1908 for the Supreme Court and many smaller courts and state offices, the Royal Street courthouse had been vacated by the state courts in 1958. The building suffered serious neglect and was in danger of being torn down or altered significantly for other purposes. In the 1980s, the Supreme Court began to explore the possibility of returning to its 1908 building, and throughout the 1990s Calogero fought to win over the legislature to the idea and to acquire state funding for the project. The renovation was completed in 2004, and the Supreme Court and its associated agencies moved back into their former home. The building now lends its dignity to the proceedings of the court and its vitality to the French Quarter.
