= Glenmora, Louisiana =

- Town
- Town of Glenmora
- The clock in downtown Glenmora

- Location of Glenmora in Rapides Parish, Louisiana.

- Location of Louisiana in the United States
- Coordinates: 30°58′24″N 92°34′57″W
- Country: United States
- State: Louisiana
- Parish: Rapides

Area
  - Total: 1.73 sq mi (4.48 km^{2})
  - Land: 1.73 sq mi (4.48 km^{2})
  - Water: 0 sq mi (0.00 km^{2})
- Elevation: 135 ft (41 m)

Population (2020)
  - Total: 1,087
  - Rank: RA: 4th
  - Density: 628.4/sq mi (242.62/km^{2})
- Time zone: UTC-6 (CST)
  - Summer (DST): UTC-5 (CDT)
- ZIP code: 71433
- Area code: 318
- FIPS code: 22-29220
- GNIS feature ID: 2406578

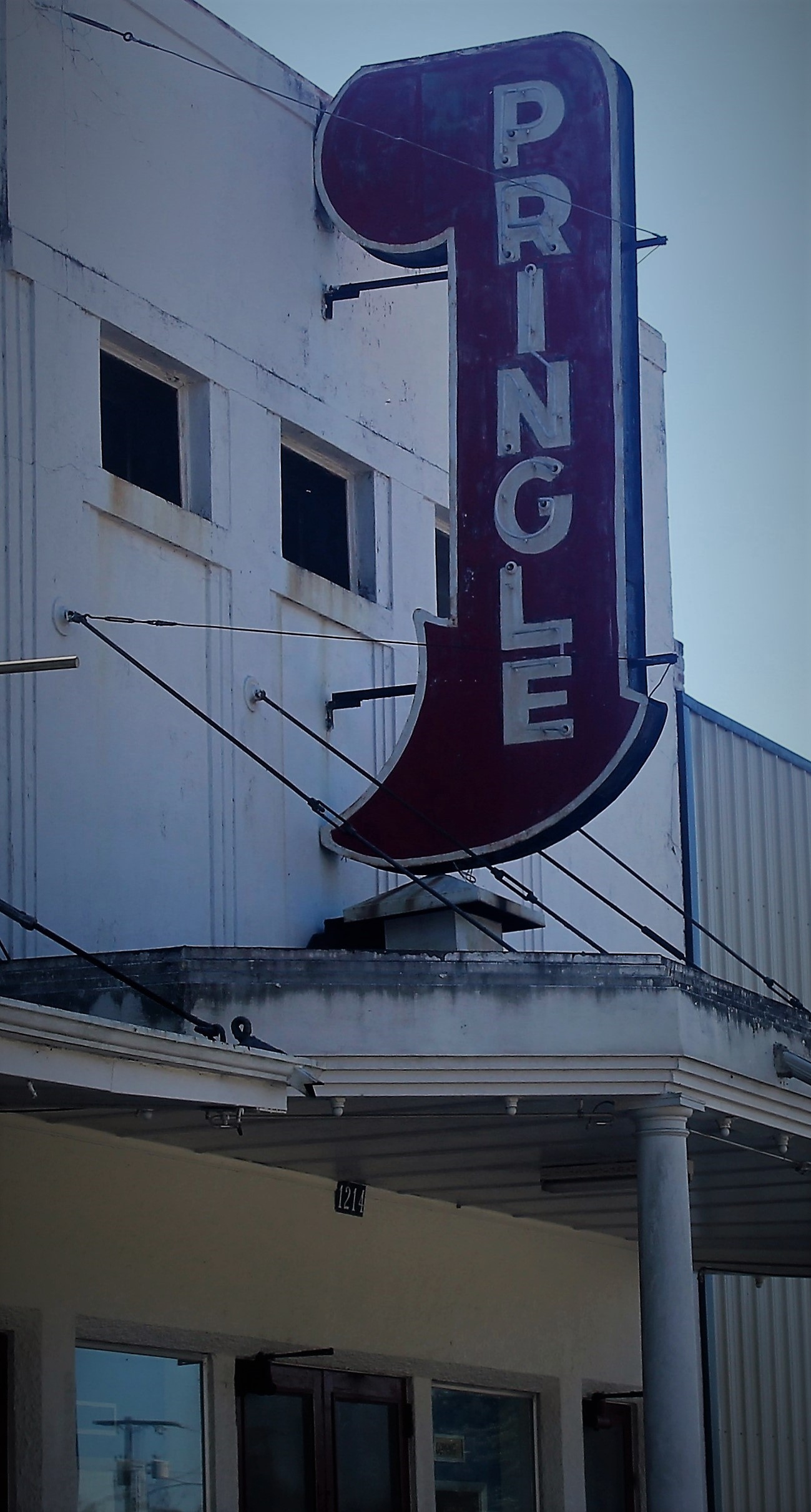
The (Previously closed) Pringle Theatre, an Art Deco structure in Glenmora, seated six hundred.

Glenmora is a town in Rapides Parish, Louisiana, United States. It is part of the Alexandria, Louisiana Metropolitan Statistical Area. The population was 1,087 at the 2020 census.

Claude Kirkpatrick, a member of the Louisiana House of Representatives from Jefferson Davis Parish from 1952–1960, a candidate for governor in 1963, and the instigator of Toledo Bend Reservoir was born in Glenmora but moved to Lake Charles when he was six years of age.

Virgil Orr, a former member of the Louisiana House from Ruston, the seat of Lincoln Parish, graduated from Glenmora High School in 1940. Lloyd George Teekell, a state representative from 1953 to 1960 and a 9th Judicial District Court judge from 1979 to 1990, was reared in Glenmora.

== Geography ==
According to the United States Census Bureau, the town has a total area of 1.7 square miles (4.4 km^{2}), all land.

== Demographics ==
Historical population
Census	Pop.	Note	%±
1920	2,298		—
1930	1,876		−18.4%
1940	1,452		−22.6%
1950	1,556		7.2%
1960	1,447		−7.0%
1970	1,651		14.1%
1980	1,479		−10.4%
1990	1,686		14.0%
2000	1,558		−7.6%
2010	1,342		−13.9%
2020	1,087		−19.0%
2025 (est.)	1,040	▼	−4.3%
U.S. Decennial Census

=== 2020 census ===
Glenmora racial composition
Race	Number	Percentage
Caucasian or White (non-Hispanic)	650	59.8%
African American or Black (non-Hispanic)	279	25.67%
Native American	7	0.64%
Asian	4	0.46%
Pacific Islander	1	0.09%
Biracial or Multiracial	45	4.14%
Hispanic or Latino	100	9.2%

As of the 2020 United States census, there were 1,087 people, 463 households, and 320 families residing in the town.

=== 2000 census ===
As of the census of 2000, there were 1,558 people, 615 households, and 415 families residing in the town. The population density was 897.1 inhabitants per square mile (346.4/km^{2}). There were 700 housing units at an average density of 403.1 per square mile (155.6/km^{2}). The racial makeup of the town was 64.96% White, 30.87% African American, 1.60% Native American, 0.77% Asian, 1.09% from other races, and 0.71% from two or more races. Hispanic or Latino of any race were 2.44% of the population.

There were 615 households, out of which 34.3% had children under the age of 18 living with them, 45.5% were married couples living together, 19.2% had a female householder with no husband present, and 32.5% were non-families. 28.6% of all households were made up of individuals, and 14.5% had someone living alone who was 65 years of age or older. The average household size was 2.53 and the average family size was 3.10.

In the town, the population was spread out, with 29.9% under the age of 18, 10.0% from 18 to 24, 25.2% from 25 to 44, 18.6% from 45 to 64, and 16.3% who were 65 years of age or older. The median age was 35 years. For every 100 females, there were 87.9 males. For every 100 females age 18 and over, there were 78.7 males.

The median income for a household in the town was $21,736, and the median income for a family was $26,739. Males had a median income of $26,328 versus $18,750 for females. The per capita income for the town was $11,535. About 22.1% of families and 27.3% of the population were below the poverty line, including 33.5% of those under age 18 and 20.8% of those age 65 or over.
