= Jack C. Watson =

American judge (1928–2022)

Jack Crozier Watson (September 17, 1928 – February 11, 2022) was a Louisiana lawyer and judge who served as a justice of the Louisiana Supreme Court from 1979 to 1996.

Born in Jonesville, Louisiana, Watson received his undergraduate degree from the University of Southwestern Louisiana (now the University of Louisiana at Lafayette) in 1949. The next year he joined the United States Air Force and served in the Philippines, Japan and Korea during the Korean War. He was discharged in 1954, and received a Juris Doctor from Louisiana State University Law School in 1956. He practiced law in Lake Charles, Louisiana until 1960, when he became an assistant district attorney for Calcasieu Parish, Louisiana from 1961 to 1964, then a judge for the Louisiana District Court for Parishes of Calcasieu and Cameron from 1964 to 1972. He then served on the 1st and 3rd Circuit Courts of Appeal from 1972 to 1979, when Governor Edwin Edwards appointed him to the Louisiana Supreme Court seat vacated by Albert Tate, when Tate was appointed to the United States Court of Appeals for the Fifth Circuit.

On September 21, 1996, Watson was defeated in his reelection bid by fellow Democrat Jeannette Knoll, 102,560 (54.7%) to 84,861 (45.3%), losing by a three-to-one margin in Avoyelles Parish.

Watson died on February 11, 2022, at the age of 93.

Political offices
Preceded by Albert Tate Jr.	Justice of the Louisiana Supreme Court; 1979–1996	Succeeded by Jeannette Knoll
