= Child custody laws in the United States =

Child custody, conservatorship and guardianship describe the legal and practical relationship between a parent and their child, such as the right of the parent to make decisions for the child, and the parent's duty to care for the child.

Custody issues typically arise in proceedings involving divorce, as well as in paternity, annulment, and other legal proceedings in which children are involved. Most jurisdictions apply the standard of the best interests of the child to determine with which parent the child will reside. In rare cases, custody may be awarded to somebody other than a parent, but only after parental rights have been terminated or where the third party is already a parental figure (i.e., a caregiver) in the child's life. When a child's parents are not married, it is necessary to establish paternity before issues of child custody or support may be determined by a court.

Family law proceedings that involve issues of custody and visitation often generate the most acrimonious disputes. In extreme cases, one parent may accuse the other of trying to "turn" the child(ren) against him or her, allege some form of emotional, physical, or even sexual abuse by the other parent, the "residential" parent may disrupt the other parent's contact or communication with the child(ren), or a parent may remove the child from the jurisdiction in violation of court orders, so as to frustrate the other parent's contact with the children.

Courts and legal professionals within the U.S. may use terms such as "parenting time" instead of custody and visitation. The goal of the newer, alternative terminology is to eliminate the distinction between custodial and noncustodial parents, and to better focus on the best interests of the children by crafting schedules that meet the developmental needs of the children. For example, small children may need shorter, more frequent time with parents, whereas older children and teenagers can tolerate and may demand less frequent shifts, but longer blocks of time with each parent.

== History ==
Before the 1970s, under the tender years doctrine, courts often assumed that a mother should receive custody of her minor children. Custody battles were rare. Since the 1970s, however, most custody laws have been made gender-neutral. Because mothers and fathers alike are eligible to receive custody, courts therefore hear more contested cases.

== State law ==
=== New York ===
Where there are children of the marriage residing in New York State and under the age of 18, a demand for custody is mandatory in divorce actions. Whether the parents are divorced or just separated one parent cannot demand the child stays between the parents. Where the children reside outside New York State custody may not be determined, except in some instances by stipulation. Custody may not be awarded to a person other than the father or mother, except under unusual circumstances that require a hearing. In unusual circumstances, children may be placed with a third party such as a grandparent or a sibling. Children under the age of 18 must be supported by both parents to the extent that they are able to support the children under the provisions of the Child Support Standards Act.

=== New Jersey ===
New Jersey courts require all divorcing parents with minor children to complete a mandatory Parents' Education Program before granting a divorce per the Parent's Education Act. The law, N.J.S.A 2A:34-12.3, enacted in 1999, was established to promote cooperation between the parties and to assist in resolving issues that arrive during the divorce process that may impact a child. However, courts will not refer a party to the program if a restraining order has been issued pursuant to the Prevention of Domestic Violence Act or if either party is restrained from contact under the criminal or civil laws of New Jersey or any other state.

=== Texas ===
In the State of Texas, rather than using the term custody, a parent who is granted custody of a child by a court is deemed a "conservator". Conservatorship is divided into two categories, a "managing conservator" and a "possessory conservator."

- The first time a court must make a decision about conservatorship, a court may presume that both parents should be Joint Managing Conservators. When joint managing conservatorship is awarded, the parties or the judge must decide on how to divide the rights and duties, which is written into the decree.
- However, the court may alternatively appoint a "Sole Managing Conservator" with one or more "Possessory Conservators". In doing so, the Judge can weigh a history of domestic violence, or whether the parent has had little prior contact or relationship with the child when considering restrictions on rights and possession. The possessory conservator may be virtually eliminated from the process of making decisions concerning health, education and welfare. The sole managing conservator takes sole responsibility for a child, making all the important decisions regarding health (both mental and physical), education, and moral or religious upbringing alone.

Conservatorship orders divide various parental rights and duties, including

(1) the right to make major decisions regarding the children;

(2) the right to have physical possession of the children; and

(3) the duty to financially support the children among the parents after the divorce.

== Rights of grandparents ==
In Troxel v. Granville (2000), the U.S. Supreme Court affirmed that a biological parent holds a fundamental right in choosing how to raise one's children as they see fit, and that right includes limiting the children's access to their grandparents.

In In re O'Donnell-Lamont (2004), the Oregon Supreme Court affirmed an Oregon statute requiring a presumption the parent acts in the child's best interests to be met prior to applying the best interests of the child standard, placing both parties on equal footing. Likewise, the court upheld the requirement set forth mandating that either a child-parent relationship or a long-term personal relationship existed between the child and non-blood related intervenor under the concept of the fundamental right of the parent. The court noted that the issue in itself allowed for an intervenor with a legitimate purpose to come forth, and through the statute's requirement of first showing the relationship, second showing the rebuttal of the presumption, and finally judging the choice on the best interest of the child standard, the fundamental right of the parent was being given proper Due Process Requirements under the 14th Amendment Due Process Clause.

== Military parents and child custody ==
In the 21st century, a new body of case law for custody of children in military families is developing due to more frequent deployments of both mothers and fathers in active duty, as well as dual-career military couples.

== Contrast with other countries ==
Following ratification of the United Nations Convention on the Rights of the Child in most countries other than the United States (which has not ratified the convention), terms such as "custody" and "access" (known as "visitation" in the United States) have been superseded in many countries by the concepts of "residence" and "contact". Instead of a parent having "custody" of or "access" to a child, a child is now said to "reside" or have "contact" with a parent. For a discussion of the new international standards, see parental responsibility.

== See also ==
- Bergeron v. Bergeron
- Child abduction
- Child advocacy
- Child support
- Divorce
- Family law
- Fathers' rights
- Men's rights
- Parenting plan
- Parental Alienation Syndrome
- Paternity
- Shared parenting
