= Virgil Orr =

American politician (1923–2021)

Virgil L. Orr
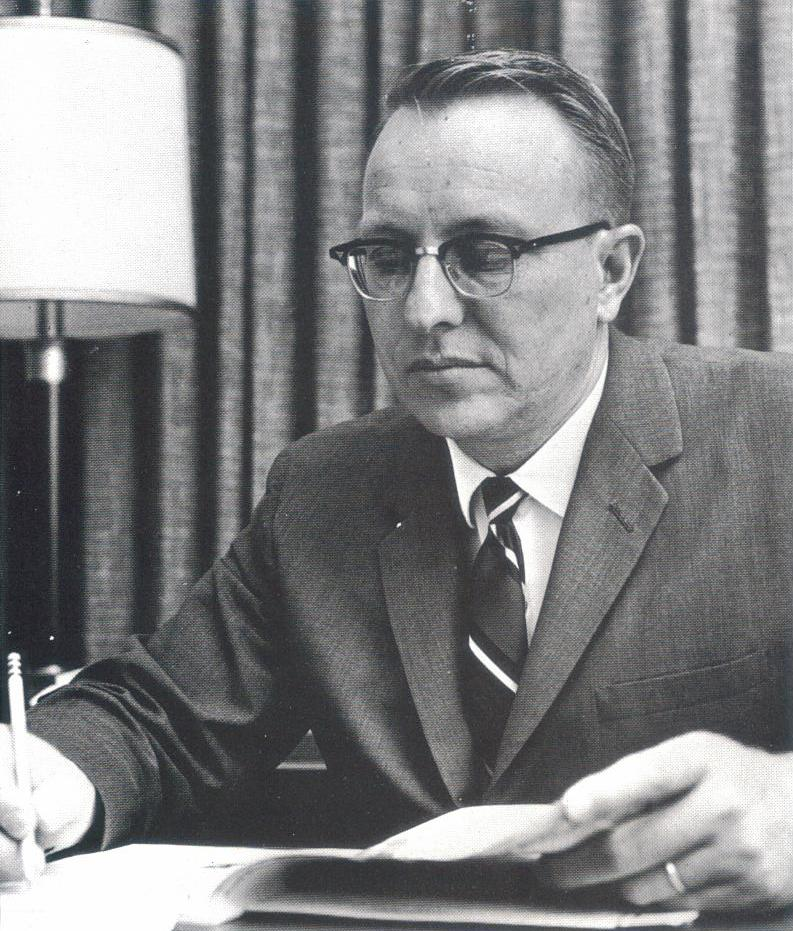
- Virgil L. Orr as Dean of Louisiana Tech University (1966)

Member of the Louisiana House of Representatives from the 12th district
- In office 1988–1992
- Preceded by: William R. Sumlin, Jr.
- Succeeded by: Jay McCallum

Personal details
- Born: February 2, 1923 Glenmora, Louisiana, U.S.
- Died: April 24, 2021 (aged 98) Ruston, Louisiana, U.S.
- Party: Democratic
- Spouse: Myrtis Chandler Orr
- Education: Glenmora High School Louisiana Tech University; Louisiana State University Oak Ridge Institute for Nuclear Studies
- Occupation: College professor and administrator

Military service
- Branch/service: United States Army (1944–1946)

Virgil L. Orr (February 2, 1923 – April 24, 2021) was an American politician and academic. He was a professor of engineering and administrator at Louisiana Tech University in Ruston, Louisiana, and served as a Democratic member of the Louisiana House of Representatives for District 12 (Lincoln and Union parishes) between 1988 and 1992.

== Early life and academic career ==
Orr was born in Glenmora, Rapides Parish in February 1923. There he graduated from Glenmora High School in 1940. He became a Bachelor of Science in chemical engineering at Louisiana Tech, whilst he had also worked as a waiter to pay his student expenses. He then achieved a Master of Science degree and Ph.D. from Louisiana State University in 1948 and 1950. Orr served in the United States Army during World War II from 1944 to 1946. He also attended the Oak Ridge Institute for Nuclear Studies in Oak Ridge, Tennessee.

In September 1952, Orr joined the Louisiana Tech faculty. In 1966, he co-authored the article, "Vapor–Liquid Equilibrium for the Hexamethyldisiloxane–n-Propyl Alcohol System", with colleagues Woodrow W. Chew, Jr. and Charles A. Killgore, which was published in the Journal of Chemical and Engineering Data. He was subsequently appointed to the role of dean of the college and served as vice president, under F. Jay Taylor, before retiring in June 1980. Louisiana Tech would later honor Orr with the Virgil Orr Professorship in Chemical Engineering and the Virgil Orr Undergraduate Junior Faculty Award.

In 1991, Orr was the recipient of the Robert E. Russ award, and three years later the Louisiana Tech Alumni Association awarded him the Tower Medallion. The following year he appeared on Louisiana Tech's Top 100 Alumni list. During 1994–1995, Orr took on the role of President of the Louisiana Tech Foundation.

== Politics ==
Orr contested the nonpartisan blanket primary in October 1987, and received 5,846 votes (44%), comfortably beating incumbent William R. Sumlin's 4,176 votes (31%). As a result, Sumlin did not contest the November election, and Orr was automatically declared representative-elect without a second round of voting.

In October 1991, he was himself defeated in a primary, by Jay McCallum, a fellow Democrat and lawyer. He received 8,286 votes (52%) to Orr's 7,528 (48%). Orr served a single term on the Louisiana Ethics Board after finishing his term in the legislature.

In 2010, he was appointed to the Lincoln Parish Library Board.

== Personal life ==
Orr and his wife, the former Myrtis Chandler (1924-2022), lived in Ruston, where Orr taught Sunday school at the Temple Baptist Church. The Louisiana Tech Alumni Association awarded Myrtis Orr with the Tower Medallion in 2018, which Virgil Orr had received some years prior. He died on April 24, 2021, at the age of 98.

Political offices
Preceded by William R. Sumlin, Jr.	Louisiana State Representative for District 12 (Lincoln and Union parishes); 1988–1992	Succeeded by Jay McCallum
