= Sara Blackwell =

American attorney

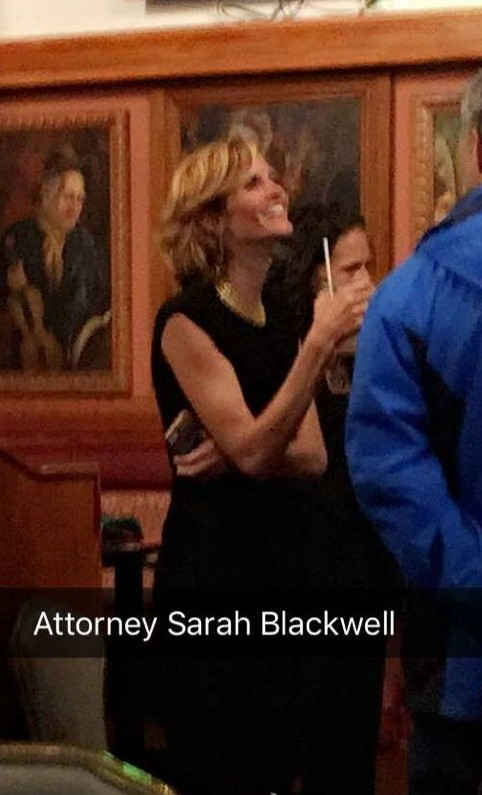
- Education: McNeese State University (BS); Louisiana State University (JD)
- Occupation: Employment rights attorney
- Years active: 2002 - present
- Website: theblackwellfirm.com

Sara Blackwell is an American attorney and is the founder of Protect US Workers, a non-profit organization. Blackwell gained national media attention when she represented hundreds of United States citizens and permanent residents who were replaced by recipients of H-1B temporary work visas. In 2018, she represented New Orleans Saints cheerleader, Bailey Davis, who was fired for an Instagram post and allegedly attending a party where NFL players were present.

== Background ==
Blackwell earned a B.S. in criminal justice from McNeese State University (1999) and her J.D. from Louisiana State University, Paul M. Hebert Law Center (2002). She currently (April 2018) teaches employment law at the University of South Florida. Her public sector experience includes working for a judge as a federal court law clerk and she served as an attorney for the Western District of Louisiana. In the private sector, she has worked for several firms as an employment attorney. She is currently the president of The Blackwell Firm.

== High profile cases ==
=== H-1B visa foreign worker replacement ===
In 2016, Blackwell represented former IT workers from the Walt Disney Company in Perrero v. HCL America, Inc. et al. The case was dismissed by Judge Gregory A. Presnell, who noted a gap in U.S. worker protections. A 1998 rule exempts some H-1B visa holders from job protection laws if they earn at least $60,000 or have a master’s degree. This applies to companies where at least 15% of employees hold H-1B or L-1 visas. According to The Atlantic, such companies can replace U.S. workers with temporary foreign workers.

Blackwell continued working on similar cases, including layoffs at the University of California, Davis (49 workers), Southern California Edison (400 workers), Carnival Cruise Line (200 workers), and Eversource Energy (220 workers), where the replacement training was called “knowledge transfer.”

She appeared on 60 Minutes and spoke at Donald Trump’s campaign events, later expressing frustration with the administration’s lack of action on visa reform in 2017.

=== NFL cheerleaders differential treatment ===
In March 2018, the New York Times printed the story of a former New Orleans Saints cheerleader's filing with the EEOC concerning the team's employment policies. The New York Times learned from Bailey Davis' interviews, emails and an eight-page handbook that unlike the rule for NFL players, the team has an anti-fraternization policy where cheerleaders must leave public accommodations if a player enters the room, may not speak to and must block NFL players on social media, may not be photographed in uniform and may not appear nude or in revealing attire. Davis was fired for appearing on her private Instagram in a one piece bathing suit.

Blackwell coordinated a series of television interviews that received widespread attention in the United States and some international media. In April, Kristan Ann Ware, a former Miami Dolphins cheerleader, joined Davis as a co-plaintiff in a legal case involving religious discrimination. The team acknowledged the incident and stated that the supervisor involved had been reprimanded but remained employed by the organization.

As of April 29, 2018, the plaintiffs are seeking arbitration with the NFL and one dollar in compensation. Prior to the Bailey Davis E.E.O.C. filing, Time magazine reported that NFL cheerleaders are paid about $10.00 per hour, and these salaries are often capped. An earlier lawsuit claimed with additional commitments and expenses, a San Francisco 49ers cheerleader earned about $2.75 per hour.

== Publications ==
Blackwell has contributed to the Jambalaya News, the Times Southwest and the City Social of Baton Rouge.

=== Books ===
- Destiny Of One, Sara Blackwell, The Peppertree Press, December 3, 2014, ISBN 978-1614933106
- Venergy, Sara Blackwell and Emily Gerety, Pants On Fire Press, Mar 16, 2017, ISBN 978-0982727140
