= Clyde Kimball =

American politician (1942–2026)

Clyde Walker Kimball

Member of the Louisiana House of Representatives
- In office 1976–1992

Personal details
- Born: July 11, 1942 New Roads, Louisiana, U.S.
- Died: October 2, 2026 (aged 84)
- Party: Democratic
- Spouse: Catherine D. Kimball
- Education: Louisiana State University

Clyde Walker Kimball (July 11, 1942 – October 2, 2026) was an American politician. He served as a Democratic member of the Louisiana House of Representatives (1976–1992).

== Life and career ==
Kimball was born in New Roads, Louisiana on July 11, 1942. He attended Louisiana State University.

In 1976, Kimball was elected to the Louisiana House of Representatives, serving until 1992.

Kimball died on October 2, 2026, at the age of 84.
