= Catherine D. Kimball =

American judge

Catherine D. "Kitty" Kimball

Chief Justice of the Louisiana Supreme Court
- In office January 12, 2009 – February 1, 2013
- Preceded by: Pascal F. Calogero, Jr.
- Succeeded by: Bernette Joshua Johnson

Member of the Louisiana Supreme Court (Place Five)
- In office January 1, 1993 – February 1, 2013
- Preceded by: Luther F. Cole
- Succeeded by: Jefferson D. Hughes III

Judge of the 18th Judicial District in Louisiana
- In office 1983–1991
- Preceded by: Dan Kimball
- Succeeded by: James J. Best

Personal details
- Born: Catherine Dick; February 7, 1945 (age 81) Alexandria, Rapides Parish; Louisiana, U.S.
- Party: Democrat; Independent
- Spouse: Clyde Kimball
- Children: 3
- Education: Louisiana State University; Louisiana State University Law Center (J.D.)
- Occupation: Judge; Attorney

Catherine D. (Kitty) Kimball (born February 7, 1945) is the retired Chief Justice of the Louisiana Supreme Court. She was also the first woman elected to the Louisiana Supreme Court, in 1992. Before that, in 1983, she was the first female judge in the 18th Judicial District.

== Biography ==
Kimball was born in Alexandria, Louisiana, and was married to Clyde Kimball (1942–2026), a Louisiana state representative and deputy secretary of the Louisiana Department of Wildlife and Fisheries. A graduate of Bolton High School in Alexandria, she received her J.D. from the Louisiana State University law school in 1970.

She worked as a sole practitioner from 1975 - 1982 and as ADA from 1978 - 1982.

Kimball had a stroke on January 10, 2010 and underwent post-stroke rehabilitation therapy at the Neuromedical Rehabilitation Hospital in Baton Rouge until her release on February 19, 2010. At that time she was a resident of Ventress, Louisiana.

She retired from the Louisiana Supreme Court bench in January 2013; she was succeeded by Judge Jefferson D. Hughes, III.

== Legacy ==
In 2011, Justice Kimball was inducted into the Louisiana Political Museum and Hall of Fame in Winnfield.

She has received the CASA Association President’s Award and Judge of the Year Award.

== See also ==
- List of first women lawyers and judges in Maine
- List of female state supreme court justices

Political offices
| Preceded by Pascal F. Calogero, Jr. | Chief Justice of the Louisiana Supreme Court; 2009–2013 | Succeeded by Bernette Joshua Johnson |
| Preceded by Luther F. Cole | Justice of the Louisiana Supreme Court; 1993–2013 | Succeeded by Jefferson D. Hughes III |
| Preceded by Dan Kimball | Judge of the Louisiana 18th Judicial District Court; 1983–1991 | Succeeded by James J. Best |
