= Scott Crichton (judge) =

American judge (born 1954)

Associate Justice of the Louisiana Supreme Court
- In office January 1, 2015 – January 1, 2025
- Preceded by: Jeffrey P. Victory
- Succeeded by: John Guidry

Personal details
- Born: Scott Jackson Crichton; June 1, 1954 (age 72) Shreveport, Louisiana, U.S.
- Party: Democratic (before 2014); Republican (2014–present)
- Spouse: Susie Simonton (c. 1986–present)
- Children: 2
- Education: Louisiana State University (BA, JD)

Scott Jackson Crichton (born June 1, 1954) is a former associate justice of the Louisiana Supreme Court. He was a judge of the Louisiana 1st Judicial District Court in Shreveport from 1991 to 2014. Crichton was elected to the district court in 1990 as a Democrat. In 2014, he ran without opposition to succeed the retiring Justice Jeffrey P. Victory for the District 2 seat on the seven-member state Supreme Court. The nonpartisan blanket primary for the position was held on November 4, 2014, in eleven northwest Louisiana parishes.

In 2024, Crichton did not seek a second ten-year term on the Supreme Court and was succeeded by John Michael Guidry.

== Background ==
Crichton is the son of Thomas Crichton, III (1917–1989), who though born in Monroe was a businessman-landholder descended from a pioneer family in Minden in Webster Parish east of Shreveport. His mother, the former Mary Murff (1919–1983), was a native of Shreveport; her grandfather was a district court judge in 1906. Crichton himself was born in Shreveport but attended school for the first eight years in Minden. For high school, he was sent to the private boarding school, the Webb School in Bell Buckle in Bedford County near Shelbyville in middle Tennessee. The school then had an enrollment of only two hundred, but with a demanding curriculum, honor code, and required obstacle courses including the development of survival skills.

After graduation from the Webb School, Crichton attended Louisiana State University in Baton Rouge, from which he received his undergraduate degree in 1976. In 1980, he received his Juris Doctor degree from the Louisiana State University Law Center. He and his wife, the former Susan "Susie" Simonton (born November 23, 1957), whom he married c. 1986, have two sons, Stuart Jackson Crichton (a 2013 LSU Law school graduate) and Sam Crichton (a 2014 LSU Law school graduate). Since 1985, the judge has been a member of St. Mark's Cathedral, an Episcopal cathedral in Shreveport.

== Legal career ==
More than five hundred people attended Crichton's campaign kickoff party on April 29, 2013, at Ernest's Orleans Restaurant in Shreveport. Among those in attendance were fellow judges and law enforcement officials from around the state. Had he drawn an opponent, Crichton's campaign was to have been co-managed by his wife Susie and Carolyn Prator, the wife of Crichton's friend, Caddo Parish Sheriff Steve Prator.

In 2017, Crichton wrote in a concurring opinion that a prisoner being interrogated by police who said "just give me a lawyer, dog" did not actually request a lawyer, because the request was ambiguous as to whether the prison was requesting a lawyer or a dog.

Legal offices
Preceded by Jeffrey P. Victory	Associate Justice of the Louisiana Supreme Court; 2015–2025	Succeeded by John Guidry
