= 2025 Washington elections =

Elections in Washington state, US

Multiple elections occurred on November 4, 2025, with primary elections held on August 5, 2025.

== State legislative special elections ==
9 of the 147 state legislative seats were up for special election in 2025 as a result of deaths and resignations among members, 5 in the Senate and 4 in the House. All nine elections are in the Seattle area.

=== House of Representatives ===
Parties	Seats			
Parties	2024	Up	Won	Change
Democratic Party	59	4	4	Steady
Republican Party	39	0	0	Steady
Total	98	4	4	Steady

=== Senate ===
Parties	Seats			
Parties	2024	Up	Won	Change
Democratic Party	30	5	5	Steady
Republican Party	19	0	0	Steady
Total	49	5	5	Steady

== Judicial ==
Two special elections to the Washington Court of Appeals took place in November 2025. No more than two candidates filed in either race, so primary elections were cancelled.

=== Division I, District 2 ===
==== Candidates ====
===== Declared =====
- Tam T. Bui, Snohomish County District Judge
- Karen D. Moore, Snohomish County Superior Court Judge

==== Results ====
Election results
Candidate	Votes	%
Tam T. Bui	88,539	52.67
Karen D. Moore	78,829	46.96
Write-in	617	0.37
Total votes	167,858	100.00

=== Division III, District 3 ===
==== Candidates ====
===== Declared =====
- Megan Murphy, incumbent judge

==== Results ====
Election results
Candidate	Votes	%
Megan Murphy (incumbent)	58,157	98.11
Write-in	1,120	1.89
Total votes	59,277	100.00

== Local elections ==
Municipal elections in Washington are nonpartisan, while county elections are partisan.

=== Seattle ===
The municipality of Seattle has 499,210 active voters as of May 1, 2025.

==== Mayoral election ====
The incumbent mayor of Seattle is Democrat Bruce Harrell. He ran for re-election to a second term.

==== City attorney election ====
The incumbent Seattle City Attorney is Republican Ann Davison. She ran for re-election to a second term.

=== King County ===
King County, Washington has 1,428,492 active voters as of May 1, 2025.

==== April Proposition 1 ====
A special ballot measure election was held on April 22. The amendment was successful.

April 2025 King County Proposition 1
Choice	Votes	%
For	151,495	59.72
Against	102,189	40.28
Total	253,684	100.00
Registered voters/turnout	1,424,836	17.80
