= Bernette Joshua Johnson =

American judge (born 1943)

Bernette Johnson
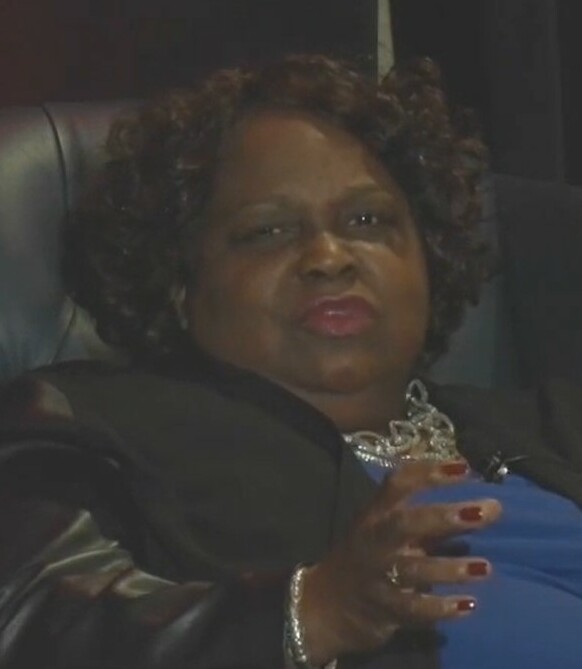
- Johnson in 2017

Chief Justice of the Louisiana Supreme Court
- In office February 1, 2013 – December 31, 2020
- Preceded by: Catherine Kimball
- Succeeded by: John L. Weimer

Associate Justice of the Louisiana Supreme Court from the 7th district
- In office October 31, 1994 – December 31, 2020
- Preceded by: Seat established
- Succeeded by: Piper D. Griffin

Personal details
- Born: June 17, 1943 (age 83) Donaldsonville, Louisiana, U.S.
- Party: Democratic
- Education: Spelman College (BA); Louisiana State University, Baton Rouge (JD)

Bernette Joshua Johnson (born June 17, 1943) is an American lawyer from New Orleans, who served as the chief justice of the Louisiana Supreme Court from 2013 to 2020.

She is the first African American to serve in this position, and succeeded Catherine D. Kimball.

== Early life and education ==
Johnson was born in 1943 in Donaldsonville, Louisiana. She attended local public schools, which were still segregated. She went to college at Spelman College in Georgia, earning a Bachelor of Arts in 1964.She decided to go to law school after working for a summer for the NAACP Legal Defense Fund with lawyers who were doing school desegregation cases. She attended the state Paul M. Hebert Law School at Louisiana State University, and was one of the first African-American women to graduate from its law program, earning a Juris Doctor in 1969.

She interned at the United States Department of Justice during the summer while still in law school, helping with cases to implement the Civil Rights Act of 1964.

== Career ==
Johnson emphasized civil rights and legal assistance to the poor. After passing the bar, she became the managing attorney at the New Orleans Legal Assistance Corporation (NOLAC), serving from 1969 to 1973.

In 1984, she was elected to the Orleans Parish Civil District Court, the first woman to serve as a judge in that court. She was re-elected in 1990 and in 1994 attained seniority, gaining the position of chief judge of that court.

Johnson ran unsuccessfully for the Fourth Circuit Court of Appeal in the nonpartisan blanket primary held on October 1, 1994.

In Chisom v. Edwards (1988), a suit started in 1987 and brought under the Voting Rights Act of 1965 (as amended in 1982), the federal court found that the state's "system for electing justices diluted black voting strength" in the way that the districts were defined, in violation of the VRA. In 1987 the First Supreme Court District included Orleans and three other parishes. Two justices were elected at-large from this district, which had a white majority population around New Orleans. But Orleans Parish population comprised the majority of the district and was majority African American. The plaintiffs contended that this system diluted their vote, preventing them from electing candidates of their choice. They sought a remedy to have the district divided into two: one for Orleans Parish and one for the other three parishes.

In Clark v. Edwards, a suit was brought against the state by black lawyers, who argued that the system of judicial election discriminated against them. The court heard expert testimony as to racially polarized voting in Louisiana, for judicial seats as well as other positions, and how few African Americans were elected to judicial positions under the at-large system. Whites did not vote for black candidates, even by a plurality. The court noted that "black citizens comprise about thirty percent of Louisiana's population[,] [b]lack lawyers now hold only 5 of the 178 district court judgeships and only 1 of 48 court of appeal judgeships."(p. 479)

Analyzing districts to determine where there were problems in minority vote dilution, the court formulated a federal consent decree that established sub-districts within some judicial districts. The consent decree operated from 1992 to 2000, establishing a sub-district in Orleans Parish, with the other sub-district covering the three parishes outside, and therefore adding an eighth position to the Supreme Court, known as the "Chisom seat".

Johnson was appointed in 1994 as the eighth associate justice to the State Supreme Court under this settlement.

In 2000 the state was allowed to revert to seven judicial districts in its election of the State Supreme Court; Johnson ran for the reconfigured 7th Supreme Court District that year, and was elected in her own right. She was re-elected to this seat in 2010.

The Louisiana Constitution of 1974 directs that the longest-serving associate justice becomes chief justice should a vacancy occur prior to the next regular election. In 2012 the position of chief justice was going to open based on the incumbent's retirement. Associate Justice Johnson was eligible by strict seniority to become chief justice, but Judge Jeffrey P. Victory, a Republican from Shreveport, also sought the position.

Johnson claimed the right to succeed Kimball under the state constitution. Justice Victory had maintained that he was the legitimate successor because he was elected to the Supreme Court on November 8, 1994, and had previously been a judge of the Second Circuit Court of Appeal for four years. Johnson's tenure on the Supreme Court preceded that of Victory by less than three months. When her colleagues on the court said that they were going to debate the eligibility of the two candidates, Johnson filed a federal suit on the issue in July 2012.

United States District Judge Susie Morgan ruled in September 2012 that Johnson had the greater seniority under the state constitution. In October 2012, the state Supreme Court members (Johnson, Victory and another candidate recused themselves) declared that Johnson would succeed Kimball because the start of Johnson's tenure predated that of Victory. They concluded that her seniority was more important than the fact that she had not gained her seat on the Supreme Court by election.

Johnson is the first African American to serve as chief justice in Louisiana. She is the first African-American woman to serve on the Louisiana Supreme Court as both associate justice and chief justice.

== See also ==
- List of female state supreme court justices
- List of African-American jurists

Legal offices
New seat	Associate Justice of the Louisiana Supreme Court from the 7th district 1994–2020	Succeeded by Piper D. Griffin
Preceded by Catherine Kimball	Chief Justice of the Louisiana Supreme Court; 2013–2020	Succeeded by John L. Weimer
