= John L. Weimer =

American judge (born 1954)

John Weimer

Chief Justice of the Louisiana Supreme Court
- Incumbent
- Assumed office January 7, 2021
- Preceded by: Bernette Joshua Johnson

Associate Justice of the Louisiana Supreme Court from the 6th district
- Incumbent
- Assumed office December 13, 2001
- Preceded by: Harry Lemmon

Personal details
- Born: October 2, 1954 (age 71) Thibodaux, Louisiana, U.S.
- Party: Independent
- Education: Louisiana State University, Baton Rouge (BA, JD)

John Louis Weimer III (born October 2, 1954) is an American judge who has served as the chief justice of the Louisiana Supreme Court since 2021.

Weimer received a Juris Doctor from Louisiana State University in 1980. In 1995, he was elected District Judge for the 17th Judicial District Court. In 1998, he was elected as an Appellate Judge for the Louisiana Court of Appeal, First Circuit. He served in that capacity until he took his seat as Associate Justice of the Supreme Court in 2001. Weimer took the oath of office as Chief Justice of the Louisiana Supreme Court on January 7, 2021.

Legal offices
Preceded by Harry T. Lemmon	Justice of the Louisiana Supreme Court; 2001–present	Incumbent
Preceded by Bernette Joshua Johnson	Chief Justice of the Louisiana Supreme Court; 2021–present	Incumbent
