= Jefferson D. Hughes III =

American judge (born 1952)

Jefferson Hughes

Associate Justice of the Louisiana Supreme Court from the 5th district
- Incumbent
- Assumed office February 1, 2013
- Preceded by: Catherine D. Kimball

Personal details
- Born: January 9, 1952 (age 74) Denham Springs, Louisiana, U.S.
- Party: Republican
- Education: Louisiana State University (BA, JD)

Jefferson Davis Hughes III (born January 9, 1952) is an American lawyer who has served as an associate justice of the Supreme Court of Louisiana since 2013.

== Early life and education ==
Hughes graduated Denham Springs High School in 1970. He received a bachelor's degree in history and Juris Doctor from Louisiana State University. He was admitted to the Louisiana Bar in October 1978.

== Career ==
After law school, Hughes clerked for Judge Frank Polozola before entering private practice. In 1990, Hughes was elected district judge for the 21st Judicial District Court. In 2004 he was elected as a judge for the Louisiana Court of Appeal, First Circuit. He served in that capacity until he took his seat as associate justice of the Supreme Court in 2013. In 2018, Hughes was reelected without opposition.

In August 2026, Hughes was awarded $300,000 in a defamation trial over a 2019 editorial published by The Advocate, regarding his handling of a child custody case while serving as a district court judge. Hughes had sought $10 million in damages.
