= Piper D. Griffin =

American judge (born 1962)

Piper Griffin
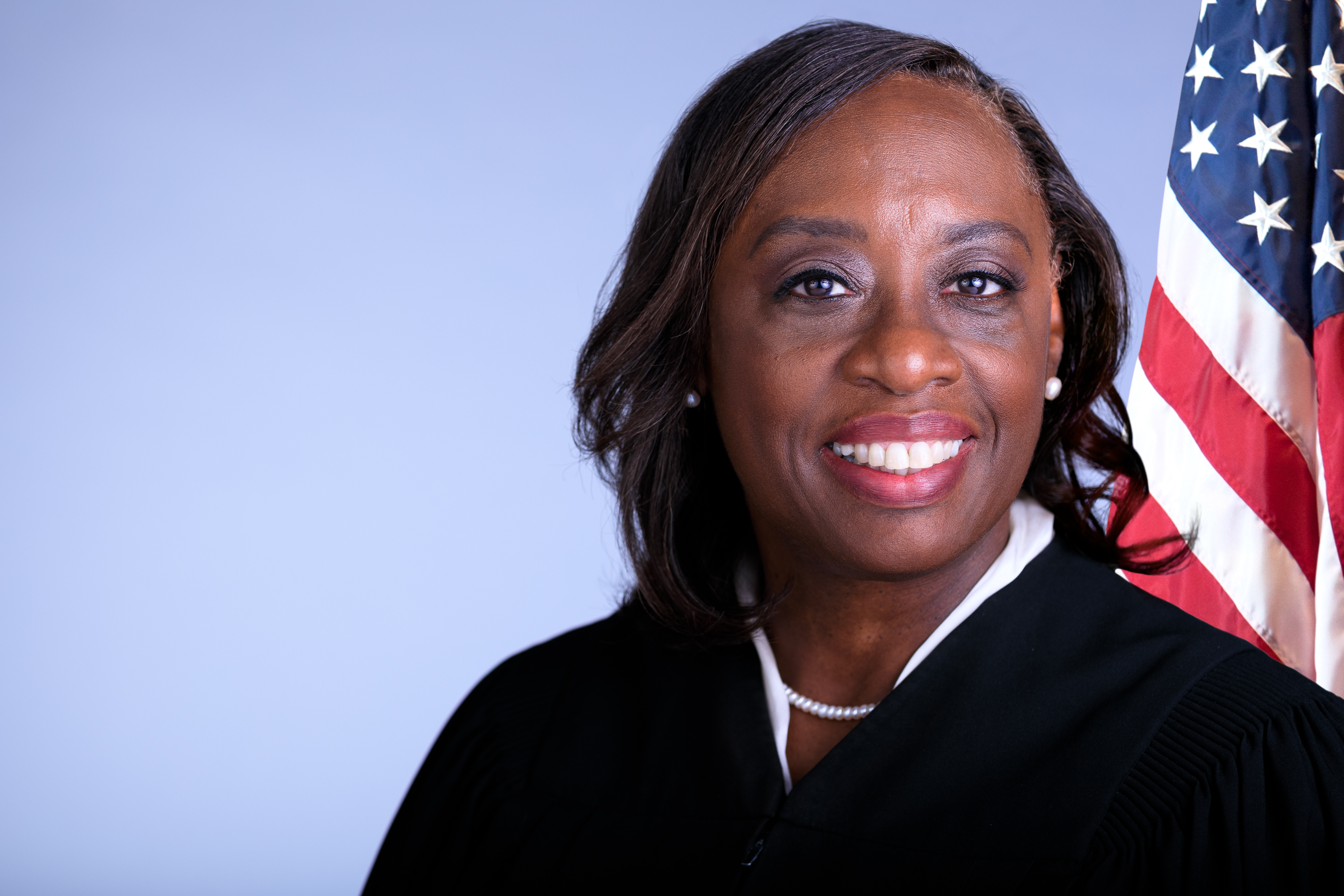

Associate Justice of the Louisiana Supreme Court
- Incumbent
- Assumed office January 1, 2021
- Preceded by: Bernette Joshua Johnson

Personal details
- Born: Piper Dinita Griffin; February 2, 1962 (age 64) New Orleans, Louisiana, U.S.
- Party: Democratic
- Education: University of Notre Dame (BA); Louisiana State University (JD)

Piper Dinita Griffin (born February 2, 1962) is an American lawyer who has served as an associate justice of the Louisiana Supreme Court since 2021.

== Early life and education ==
A lifelong resident of New Orleans, Griffin attended Xavier University Preparatory School. Griffin graduated from the University of Notre Dame in 1984 with a Bachelor of Arts in Government. She received her Juris Doctor from Louisiana State University's Paul M. Hebert Law Center in 1987

== State judicial career ==
In 2001, Griffin was elected to the Orleans Parish Civil District Court. She has chaired numerous judicial committees and as well as serving as chief judge. In 2019, Griffin was elected as Second Vice President of the Louisiana District Judges Associations.

=== Louisiana Supreme Court ===
In July 2020, Griffin announced her candidacy for associate justice of the Louisiana Supreme Court. In November 2020, Griffin won election to her seat outright after her opponent dropped out, cancelling a runoff election.

== Awards and recognition ==
Year	Award	Organization
1995	Service Award	Greater New Orleans Louis A. Martinet Legal Society
1997	Distinguished Black Exemplar: Top 50 Most Distinguished African American Graduates	Notre Dame University
2003	Ernest N. Morial Judicial Pacesetter Award	Greater New Orleans Louis A. Martinet Legal Society
2003	Civic Award	Alliance for Good Government
2004	Award for Exemplary Community Service	Sigma Gamma Rho sorority
2018	Women of Achievement Nominee	NBA Women’s Lawyer Division - National Bar Association
2018	Lifetime Achievement Award	Greater New Orleans Louis A. Martinet Legal Society
2019	Sarah J. Harper Humanitarian Award	Louisiana Judicial Council
2019	Woman of the Year Award	First District Missionary Society, Women’s Department
2020	Thomas Jefferson Justice By the People Award	American Board of Trial Advocates

== Committees and memberships ==
Griffin was the first African American woman to serve as chairperson of the Young Lawyers section of the New Orleans Bar Association and the first African American woman to serve as a Louisiana Bar examiner. She is a current board member and former president (2015-2019) St Katharine Drexel Preparatory School (formerly Xavier University Preparatory School) She is the former president of the Crescent City Chapter of Links (2015–2019), past member of the United Way Agency Relations Committee, past-president and treasurer of the Greater New Orleans YWCA, and past board member of Catholic Charities of New Orleans.

Legal offices
Preceded by Bernette Joshua Johnson	Associate Justice of the Louisiana Supreme Court; 2021–present	Incumbent
