= Cade Cole =

American judge (born 1983)

Associate Justice of the Louisiana Supreme Court
- Incumbent
- Assumed office March 10, 2025
- Preceded by: James T. Genovese

Personal details
- Party: Republican
- Education: Tulane University (BA, JD)

Cade R. Cole (born 1983) is an American lawyer who has served as an associate justice of the Louisiana Supreme Court since 2025. His current term ends December 31, 2036. Cole chairs the Judicial Budgetary Control Board and Court Cost Committee, is vice chair of the Technology Fund Review Committee, and is a member of the Judicial Council and Supreme Court Historical Society Board of Directors.

== Education ==
Cole received a Bachelor of Arts from Tulane University and a Juris Doctor from Tulane University Law School. While in law school, he received the award for highest performance in Obligations II, Income Tax, Public Utility law and Energy Regulation. After law school, Cole served as a law clerk to Justice Jeannette Knoll of the Louisiana Supreme Court before entering private practice in Lake Charles, Louisiana.

== Legal career ==
When serving as a tax judge, Cole was the only judge in Louisiana with statewide jurisdiction. He has served on the DeQuincy Municipal Court and was the city attorney for Sulphur, Vinton, and DeQuincy. He was also a prosecutor and an Assistant District Attorney in the Louisiana 38th and 14th Judicial Districts.

Cole also served as Special Master to expedite the resolution of hurricane related suits in 16 Louisiana parishes and in the United States District Court for Western Louisiana. He also served as a member of the vetting committee for federal judicial appointments in Louisiana during the first term of President Donald Trump. He chaired the federal court's Magistrate Judge Selection Committee in 2023.

It was reported by The Advocate that Cole was “the early favorite” to succeed Justice James T. Genovese on the Louisiana Supreme Court.

Cole was elected to the Louisiana Supreme Court on January 29, 2025, when no other candidates qualified to run against him. He was sworn into office on April 3, 2025 by retired Justice Jeannette Knoll. He was elected without opposition to a full 10 year term ending December 31, 2036.

== Memberships and awards ==
Cole is a member of the Florida and Louisiana bars. He previously served as Louisiana State College Republican Chair and as a member of the Federalist Society. He was appointed to the Louisiana Service Commission by Governor Mike Foster.

Cole received the 2013 President's Award for Outstanding Service to the Southwest Louisiana Bar Association for work to stabilize indigent defense funding.

Cole has served the Louisiana State Bar Association as Tax Section Chair, House of Delegates Member, and Member of the CLE Programming Committee. He previously served as Chairman of the Tax Law Advisory Commission for the Louisiana Board of Legal Specialization.

Legal offices
Preceded by James T. Genovese	Associate Justice of the Louisiana Supreme Court; 2025–present	Incumbent
