= Marcus R. Clark =

American judge (1956–2024)

Justice of the Louisiana Supreme Court
- In office November 19, 2009 – June 30, 2020
- Preceded by: Chet D. Taylor
- Succeeded by: Jay McCallum

Personal details
- Born: February 24, 1956 Sulphur, Louisiana, U.S.
- Died: September 25, 2024 (aged 68) Gainesville, Georgia, U.S.
- Party: Republican
- Education: University of Louisiana at Monroe (BA); Louisiana State University (JD)

Marcus R. Clark (February 24, 1956 – September 25, 2024) was an American lawyer who served as a justice of the Louisiana Supreme Court from 2009 to 2020. Clark was a registered Republican.

== Early life and education ==
Clark was born in Sulphur, Louisiana, on February 24, 1956, to Gerald and Hilda Clark. He earned a Bachelor of Arts from University of Louisiana at Monroe in 1982 and his Juris Doctor from the Paul M. Hebert Law Center of Louisiana State University in 1985.

== Career ==
After graduating law school, Clark began his legal career with the Ouachita Parish District Attorney's Office and earned the title of chief felony drug prosecutor by 1990. From 1978 to 1982, he served as a detective with the Ouachita Parish Sheriff's Office in Monroe.

In 1997, he became a district judge of the Fourth Judicial District Court. While a district judge he served as a drug court judge from 2000 to 2001 and as chief judge from 2004 to 2006.

=== Louisiana Supreme Court ===
In 2009, Clark was elected to the Louisiana Supreme Court. In December 2019, Clark announced he was retiring effective June 30, 2020.

== Death ==
Clark died on September 25, 2024, at the age of 68.

Legal offices
Preceded by Chet D. Taylor	Justice of the Louisiana Supreme Court; 2009–2020	Succeeded by Jay McCallum
