= Reggie Bagala =

American politician (1965–2020)

Member of the Louisiana House of Representatives from the 54th district
- In office January 13, 2020 – April 9, 2020
- Preceded by: Jerry "Truck" Gisclair
- Succeeded by: Joseph Orgeron

Personal details
- Born: Reggie Paul Bagala; July 8, 1965
- Died: April 9, 2020 (aged 54) Raceland, Louisiana, U.S.
- Party: Republican
- Spouse: Marissa
- Children: 1
- Education: Louisiana State University
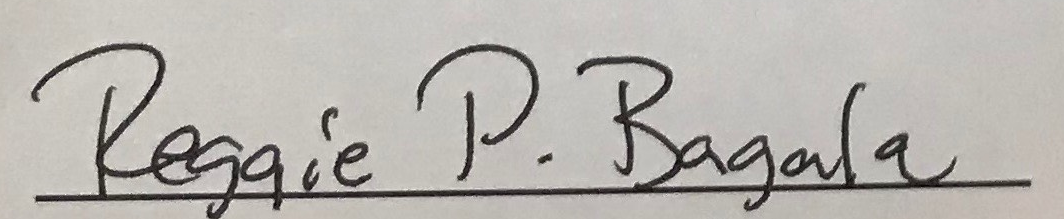
- Signature

Reggie Paul Bagala (July 8, 1965 – April 9, 2020) was an American politician who served in the Louisiana House of Representatives as a member of the Republican Party for four months.

== Early life and education ==
Bagala was born on July 8, 1965, and graduated from Louisiana State University in 1989.

== Career ==
From 2014 to 2017, Bagala served as the Lafourche Parish administrator and as director of the Office of Community Services before being fired by Lafourche Parish President Jimmy Cantrelle after Bagala refused to call council members about an insurance policy. However, he was hired by the council to serve as its auditor. He later filed a lawsuit against Cantrelle for violating his First Amendment rights, but his lawsuit was dismissed in 2019.

In 2019, Bagala was elected to represent the open 54th district in the Louisiana House of Representatives. Incumbent Representative Jerry "Truck" Gisclair, a Democrat, was term-limited and could not seek re-election.

== Death ==
On April 1, 2020, Bagala tested positive for COVID-19 and was hospitalized in Raceland, Louisiana. On April 9, Bagala died at the age of 54. On July 11, a special election was held to replace the vacancy in the House of Representatives created by Bagala's death in which Joseph Orgeron won.

Political offices
Preceded by Jerry "Truck" Gisclair	Louisiana Representatives; 54th District; 2020	Succeeded by Joseph Orgeron
