= James T. Genovese =

American judge (born 1949)

Jimmy Genovese

President of Northwestern State University
- Incumbent
- Assumed office August 19, 2024
- Preceded by: Marcus Jones

Associate Justice of the Louisiana Supreme Court
- In office January 1, 2017 – August 5, 2024
- Preceded by: Jeannette Knoll
- Succeeded by: Cade Cole

Personal details
- Born: August 24, 1949 (age 76); Opelousas, Louisiana, U.S.
- Political party: Republican
- Spouse: Martha
- Children: 5
- Education: Northwestern State University (BA); Loyola University New Orleans (JD)

James T. "Jimmy" Genovese (born August 24, 1949) is the president of Northwestern State University. He is an American lawyer who served as an associate justice of the Louisiana Supreme Court from 2017 to 2024.

== Early life and education ==
Genovese was born August 24, 1949. He is a lifelong resident of Opelousas, St. Landry Parish, Louisiana. He earned his High school diploma from the Academy of the Immaculate Conception in Opelousas, Louisiana, in 1967. He earned a Bachelor of Arts from Northwestern State University in 1971 and a Juris Doctor from Loyola University New Orleans College of Law in 1974.

== Career ==
Genovese practiced law for 21 years as a trial attorney in the general practice of law in south Louisiana.

He began his judicial career began as a judge ad hoc of the Opelousas City Court from 1975 to 1989. He was elected district judge of the Twenty-Seventh Judicial District Court for the Parish of St. Landry in 1995 and served as district judge through 2004, whereupon he was elected to the Louisiana Third Circuit Court of Appeal. He served on the appellate court from 2005 to 2016. He was elected Associate Justice of the Louisiana Supreme Court, commencing January 1, 2017. In the 2016 election, Genovese received 51 percent of the vote, narrowly defeating Judge Marilyn Castle. The Louisiana Secretary of State lists Genovese as a Republican on its election returns but as a registered Independent on the voter portal. He may have switched registration after his election, or one of the party labels may be incorrect.

He resigned in 2024 after being selected as president of Northwestern State University in Natchitoches, Louisiana.

== Personal life ==
Genovese is married to his wife Martha Janes. Together they have four daughters, one stepdaughter, and four grandchildren.

Legal offices
Preceded by Jeannette Knoll	Associate Justice of the Louisiana Supreme Court; 2017–2024	Succeeded by Cade Cole
