= Joseph Orgeron =

American politician

Member of the Louisiana House of Representatives from the 54th district
- Incumbent
- Assumed office July 2020
- Preceded by: Reggie Bagala

Personal details
- Party: Republican
- Relatives: Ed Orgeron (4th cousin)
- Education: Nicholls State University; University of Texas at Dallas

Joseph Orgeron is an American politician from Louisiana, who is a member of the Louisiana House of Representatives from the 54th district. He is a Republican.

== Early life ==
Orgeron graduated from South Lafourche High School. He earned his bachelor's degree from Nicholls State University, and his master's degree and doctorate in physics from the University of Texas at Dallas. He is an adjunct professor in maritime management at Nicholls State University.

== Career ==
In July 2020, Orgeron ran in a special election to succeed Reggie Bagala, who died in office. Orgeron won the election, and was sworn into office on July 30.

== Personal life ==
Orgeron and his wife, Angela, live in Golden Meadow, Louisiana. They have three daughters. He is a fourth cousin of Ed Orgeron.
