= John Guidry =

American judge

Associate Justice of the Louisiana Supreme Court
- Incumbent
- Assumed office January 1, 2025
- Preceded by: Scott Crichton

Personal details
- Born: John Michael Guidry; January 19, 1962 (age 64)
- Party: Democratic
- Education: Louisiana State University (BA); Southern University (JD)

John Michael Guidry (born January 19, 1962) is an American lawyer who serves as an associate justice of the Louisiana Supreme Court.

== Education ==
Guidry graduated from McKinley High School in 1980. He graduated with a Bachelor of Arts in political science from Louisiana State University in 1983 and he graduated cum laude from Southern University Law Center in 1987.

== Career ==
Guidry was a legislative assistant to Joseph A. Delpit. He also served as the assistant clerk of the Louisiana House of Representatives and an assistant parish attorney. He was elected to the Louisiana House of Representatives in 1991 and the Louisiana Senate in 1993. He was elected judge of the First Circuit Court of Appeal in 1997, and was sworn in as chief judge on January 1, 2023. He is the first Black chief judge in the history of the court.

=== Louisiana Supreme Court ===
In May 2024, Guidry announced his candidacy for the Louisiana Supreme Court. On August 20, 2024, Guidry's opponents, Leslie Chambers and Judge Marcus Hunter were ruled ineligible, making him the only candidate in the race. Guidry assumed office on January 1, 2025.

Legal offices
Preceded by Scott Crichton	Associate Justice of the Louisiana Supreme Court; 2025–present	Incumbent
