= Jay McCallum =

American judge (born 1960)

Associate Justice of the Louisiana Supreme Court
- Incumbent
- Assumed office November 13, 2020
- Preceded by: Marcus R. Clark

Member of the Louisiana House of Representatives from the 12th district
- In office January 1992 – January 1, 2003
- Preceded by: Virgil Orr
- Succeeded by: Hollis Downs

Personal details
- Born: June 6, 1960 (age 66) Bernice, Louisiana, U.S.
- Party: Republican
- Education: University of Louisiana, Monroe (BA); Louisiana State University (JD)

Jay Bowen McCallum (born June 6, 1960) is an American lawyer who has served an associate justice of the Louisiana Supreme Court since 2020. He is a former Democratic member of the Louisiana House of Representatives.

== Education and legal career ==
McCallum received his undergraduate degree from the University of Louisiana at Monroe (then Northeast Louisiana University), in 1982, and his Juris Doctor degree from the Louisiana State University Law Center in 1985.

== Judicial career ==
McCallum was elected to the Louisiana 3rd Judicial Court in September 2002, taking office the following year. On November 3, 2020, McCallum was elected to a seat on the Louisiana Supreme Court vacated by the retirement of Justice Marcus R. Clark. McCallum assumed office on November 13, 2020.

Legal offices
| Preceded by Marcus R. Clark | Associate Justice of the Louisiana Supreme Court; 2020–present | Incumbent |
