= Louisiana Supreme Court =

Highest court in the U.S. state of Louisiana

Coordinates: 29.955706°N 90.066004°W

- Seal of the Louisiana Supreme Court
- Interactive map of Louisiana Supreme Court
- Established: 1813
- Jurisdiction: Louisiana
- Location: New Orleans
- Authorised by: Constitution of Louisiana
- Appeals to: Supreme Court of the United States
- Judge term length: 10 years
- Number of positions: 7
- Website: Official website

Chief Justice
- Currently: John L. Weimer
- Since: January 1, 2021
- Lead position ends: December 31, 2030

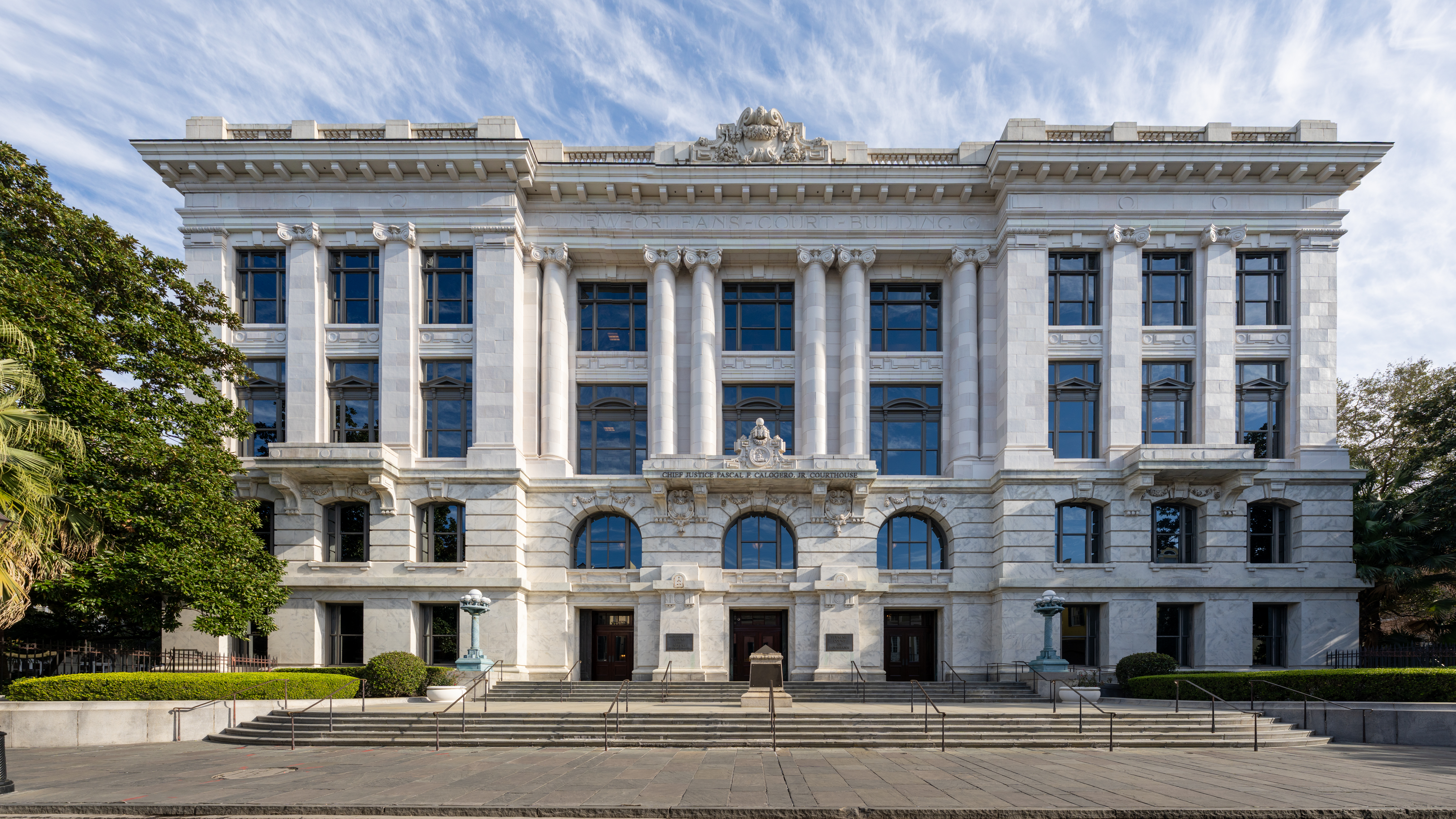
The Supreme Court Building in 2026

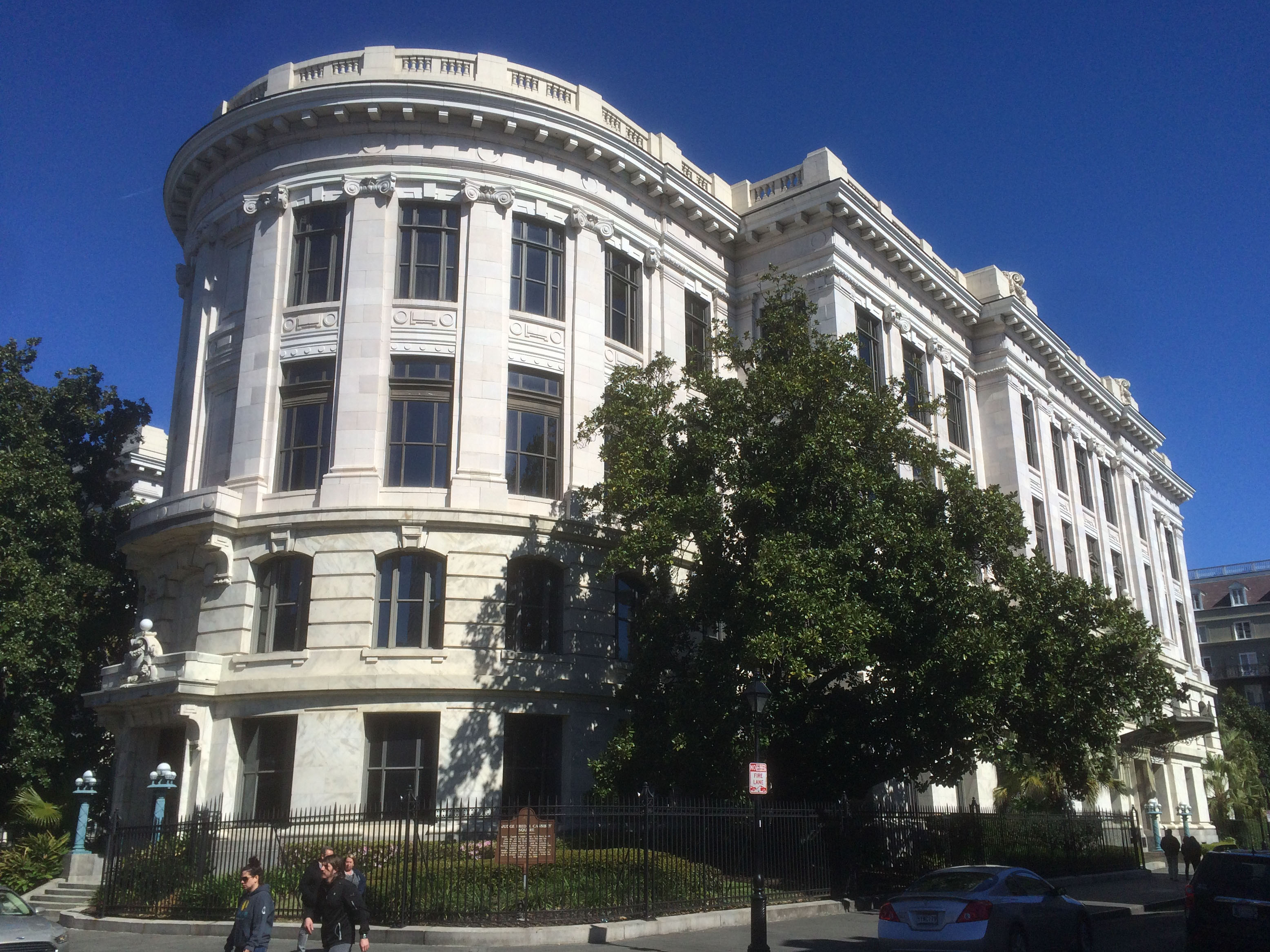
After a 20-year renovation (and a 46-year absence from the French Quarter), the court returned in 2004 to the c.1910 state court building in New Orleans' French Quarter.

The Supreme Court of Louisiana (French: Cour suprême de Louisiane; Spanish: Corte Suprema de Luisiana) is the highest court and court of last resort in the U.S. state of Louisiana. The modern Supreme Court, composed of seven justices, meets in the French Quarter of New Orleans.

The Supreme Court, and Louisiana state law, are historically based in the colonial governments of France and Spain during the 18th century. The current Supreme Court traces its roots back to these beginnings.

== French and Spanish colonial government ==
Under the colonial governments of France and Spain, the courts of what is now Louisiana existed in several different forms. In 1712, a charter granted by France created a Superior Council with executive and judicial function which functioned as a court of last resort in both civil and criminal cases. In 1769, Louisiana (New France) became Louisiana (New Spain), and the Superior Council was replaced with the Cabildo. The colonial Governor held the power of final authority in legal cases.

Note that the part of today's Louisiana known as the Florida Parishes, the part east of the Mississippi River excepting New Orleans, had a separate and distinct succession of colonial governments beginning in 1763.

== American territorial government ==
In 1803, Louisiana became a territory of the United States, known as the Territory of Orleans. In 1804, Congress created a three-judge Superior Court for the territory and gave the Legislative Council the power to create other courts. In 1807, the newly-elected Legislative Council created courts in each of the territory's nineteen parishes. These courts were courts of general jurisdiction with an appeal applying to the Superior Court.

== The Court under the state government of Louisiana ==
=== Constitution of 1812 ===
In the first constitution for the state of Louisiana, one supreme court was created and the legislature was given the power to create inferior courts. The number of judges was fixed to be not less than three and not more than five who were to be appointed by the governor. The court was required to sit in New Orleans and Opelousas.

=== Constitution of 1845 ===
The 1845 Constitution created a supreme court composed of one chief justice and three associate justices appointed by the governor to eight-year terms. The court sat in New Orleans.

=== Constitution of 1852 ===
The 1852 Constitution increased the number of justices on the court to five, and all became elected by the people. The chief justice was elected at-large by the entire state and the associate justices were elected from four districts throughout the state. The justices served ten-year terms.

=== Constitution of 1864 ===
In 1864, the justices again became appointed, and their term length was decreased to eight years.

=== Constitution of 1868 ===
The 1868 Constitution did not change the makeup or terms of the Supreme Court; however, it did change and expand its jurisdiction in civil cases to include nearly all types of cases.

=== Constitution of 1879 ===
The post-Reconstruction Constitution of 1879 substantially modified the organization of the Louisiana judiciary. The Constitution created the Supreme Court, Courts of Appeal, District Courts and Justices of the Peace. The Supreme Court retained five justices, but they were now appointed by the Governor and served twelve-year terms. For the first time, the Supreme Court was given supervisory power over the inferior courts.

It also gave more limitations to the opportunity to vote by people of color.

=== Constitution of 1898 ===
In 1898, the Supreme Court's jurisdiction was further expanded. The court was given original jurisdiction over the bar. New Orleans was fixed as the seat of the Supreme Court. The chief justice was determined by the senior justice in point of service.

=== Constitution of 1913 ===
The Constitution of 1913 affected the court by requiring that the members of the judiciary be elected instead of appointed.

=== Constitution of 1921 ===
In 1921, the court gained two seats, increasing the number of justices to seven. Due to having a large backlog in its docket, the court was authorized to sit in panels of three. The Supreme Court was also given the power to remove lower court judges from office.

=== Constitution of 1974 ===
The current Louisiana Constitution of 1974, as amended in 1980, provides for a Supreme Court composed of a Justice elected from each of seven Supreme Court Districts, serving a term of 10 years. The chief justice is not elected separately from the other justices (as is the case in other states, such as with the Texas Supreme Court); under Article V, Section 6, the "judge oldest in point of service on the supreme court" (i.e., the justice with the longest tenure on the court) serves as chief justice.

== Jurisdiction and appeals ==
The court has original jurisdiction over matters arising from disciplinary matters involving the bench and bar pursuant to La. Constitution Article V, section 5 (B).

The court has exclusive appellate jurisdiction (i.e. all intermediate courts of appeals are bypassed) over 1) any case where a law or ordinance of this state has been declared unconstitutional, or 2) when a defendant has been convicted of a capital crime and the death penalty has actually been imposed pursuant to La. Constitution Article V, section 5 (D). In all other matters, the court has regular appellate jurisdiction from the lower Courts of Appeals.

Death penalty appeals are automatic as a matter of right. All other appellate review of lower court decisions in the state is obtained by the writ of certiorari process as provided for by Article V, Section 5 (A) of the Louisiana Constitution of 1974, and Rule X of the Supreme Court Rules.

The court has general supervisory and rule making authority over all the lower state courts pursuant to La. Constitution Article V, section 5 (A). This includes the power to assign temporary judges and judges to hear cases due to recusal of lower court judges.

On certain questions involving the persons who serve as judges at any level under the constitution of the State of Louisiana, the Louisiana Supreme Court may entertain recommendations from the Judiciary Commission of Louisiana, a thirteen-member advisory body. The Supreme Court may discipline lower court judges and remove them from office.

== Districts ==
The Louisiana Supreme Court has seven election districts with each district electing one justice for a 10 year term.

The districts are composed as follows:

https://www.lasc.org/MapsofJudicialDistricts?p=SupremeCourtMap

=== First District ===
- Livingston
- Orleans (part)
- St. Bernard
- St. Tammany
- Tangipahoa
- Washington

=== Second District ===
- East Carroll
- Richland
- Ouachita (part)
- Madison
- Tensas
- Concordia
- Avoyelles
- West Feliciana
- East Feliciana
- St. Helena
- Pointe Coupee
- Iberville
- West Baton Rouge
- East Baton Rouge (part)
- Rapides (part)
- St. Landry (part)
- Lafayette (part)

=== Third District ===
- Caddo (part)
- DeSoto
- Calcasieu
- Cameron
- Jefferson Davis
- Allen
- St. Landry
- Beauregard
- Evangeline
- Sabine
- Vernon
- Natchitoches

=== Fourth District ===
- Bienville
- Caldwell
- Catahoula
- Claiborne
- Caddo (part)
- Red River
- Franklin
- Grant
- Jackson
- LaSalle
- Lincoln
- Webster
- Morehouse
- Ouachita (part)
- Rapides
- Bossier
- Union
- West Carroll
- Winn

=== Fifth District ===
- Acadia
- Iberia
- Lafayette (part)
- Lafourche
- Vermilion
- St. Martin
- St. Mary
- Terrebonne

=== Sixth District ===
- Ascension (part)
- East Baton Rouge (part)
- Jefferson (part)
- Orleans (part)
- St. James (part)
- St. John the Baptist (part)
- St. Charles (part)
- Plaquemines

=== Seventh District ===
- Jefferson (part)
- Orleans (part)
- St. James (part)
- St. John the Baptist (part)
- St. Charles (part)
- Ascension (part)

== Current composition ==
District	Name	Born	Start	Term ends (Note: Term ends Dec. 31 of the year listed.)	Party	Law school
6th	John L. Weimer, Chief Justice	October 2, 1954 (age 72)	December 13, 2001 (Note: Took office as Chief Justice on January 7, 2021.)	2032	Independent	Louisiana State
5th	Jefferson D. Hughes III	January 9, 1952 (age 74)	February 1, 2013	2028	Republican	Louisiana State
4th	Jay McCallum	June 6, 1960 (age 66)	November 13, 2020	2036	Republican	Louisiana State
7th	Piper D. Griffin	February 2, 1962 (age 64)	January 1, 2021	2030	Democratic	Louisiana State
2nd	John Guidry	January 19, 1962 (age 64)	January 1, 2025	2034	Democratic	Southern
3rd	Cade Cole	1983 (age 42–43)	April 2, 2025	2036	Republican	Tulane
1st	Billy Burris	1981 or 1982 (age 44–45)	June 17, 2026	2036	Republican	Southern

== Seniority of justices ==
The seniority of the justices on the Louisiana Supreme Court was disputed in the summer of 2012 after Chief Justice Kimball announced her retirement. The Louisiana Constitution, Art. 5, § 6, provides that "The judge oldest in point of service on the supreme court shall be chief justice." When Justice Bernette Johnson was elected in 1994, she technically filled a seat on a state appeals court but was assigned to serve on the Supreme Court on a full-time basis under the terms of a federal consent decree. Justice Jeffrey Victory, who was elected to the Supreme Court in 1995, contested Johnson's elevation to chief justice, arguing that she only became a full-fledged Supreme Court justice in 2000, when Johnson was first elected to fill a permanent seat on the court. Justice Johnson filed a federal lawsuit in the matter on July 5, 2012. On September 1, Federal District Court Judge Susie Morgan ruled that Johnson had seniority. Governor Bobby Jindal stated that it should be left to the state to interpret its constitution, and filed an appeal a week later. He then asked the 5th U.S. Circuit Court of Appeals to review the lower court's decisions. On October 16, 2012, the Louisiana Supreme Court ruled that Johnson would become the next chief justice.

== See also ==
- List of Louisiana Supreme Court elections
- Law of Louisiana
- Courts of Louisiana
- History of Louisiana
