= Safety Fund System =

Former American banking system

The Safety Fund System was one of many banking systems in the United States created after the failure of the Second Bank of the United States and before a national banking system was established. Other notable systems include the Suffolk System, the free banking system, and the Forstall System. The Safety Fund System was the nation's first experiment in bank liability insurance. It was enacted by the New York legislature in 1829 and it began to fail following the Panic of 1837.

== History ==
=== Background ===
Throughout the antebellum period, there were several attempts to establish appropriate banking controls by employing different systems. These different experiments helped the banking industry decide which kinds of regulations worked and which ones did not. The number of banks increased from 327 to 1,562 during this time and total loans increased from just over $55.1 million to $691.9 million. Bank supplied credit also increased at an average annual rate of 6.3 percent. The financial sector was increasing rapidly and the government saw fit to place regulations on the banks. Most of these regulations were at the state level because of the Federalist views held by the Jackson administration.

=== Policies ===
Officially passed under the Safety Fund Act in 1829, the system required banks to hold at least 3 percent of capital stock as reserves. Prior to the Act, New York banks were notoriously corrupt and bank customers had no protection from losses they would occur. These reserves were held in a common fund with all the banks of New York and were to be used to pay all debts of failed banks except capital stock. Banks were also subject to inspections to ensure proper compliance with new banking regulations.

=== Downfall ===
After the Panic of 1837, the Safety Fund System was nearly bankrupt. The stress put on the system by the Panic eventually caused it to fail as deflation soared because the banks of New York began to only accept specie. Upon its initial passing, lawmakers did not realize the impact this insurance could have. The promise of reimbursement caused the system to break down under the burden of numerous bank failures from 1840–1842. This paved the way for the free banking system.

=== Effects ===
The idea of bank liability insurance that was first implemented in the Safety Fund System is still prevalent in the United States banking system today. The Federal Deposit Insurance Corporation was created to ensure that banks are following the precedent of holding reserves. The Safety Fund System was extremely influential in the advancement of banking in the United States and its effects are still seen today.

== See also ==
- Antebellum Era in the United States
