= Isadore Dyer =

American physician

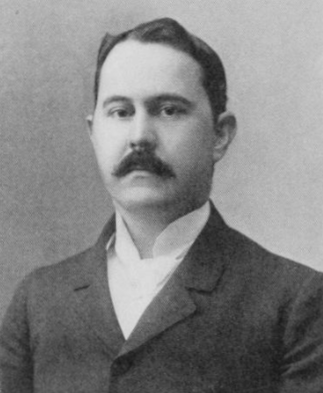
- Born: November 2, 1865; Galveston, Texas, US
- Died: October 12, 1920 (aged 54); New Orleans, Louisiana, US
- Burial place: Metairie Cemetery
- Education: Tulane University
- Occupation: Physician
- Spouse: Mercedes Louise Percival (m. 1905)
- Children: 6

Isadore Dyer (November 2, 1865 – October 12, 1920) was an American physician.

== Early life ==
Isadore Dyer was born in Galveston, Texas on November 2, 1865, the son of Isadore Dyer Sr. (1814–1888) and his wife, Amelia Ann (née Lewis). Isadore Sr. had immigrated to the United States from Germany in 1815; he served in the Mexican-American War and became a banker in Galveston.

== Education and career ==
He attended a private school in Galveston, the New York Grammar School, and the Bellevue High School in Bellevue, Virginia. He graduated from Sheffield Scientific School at Yale in 1887, studied at the University of Virginia from 1887 to 1888, and received his M. D. at Tulane in 1889. After an internship of three years in New York, he served at Tulane in various capacities, becoming professor of diseases of the skin in 1905 and dean of the medical department in 1908. In 1894 he founded the Louisiana Leper Home, and in 1896 Dr. Dyer became editor of the New Orleans Medical and Surgical Journal. He was president of the Louisiana State Medical Society (1902–03), vice president of the American Medical Association (1903), vice-president of the New York Medico-Legal-Society (1908–10), and a lieutenant in the United States Army Medical Reserve Corps (1908). Dr. Dyer was the author of articles in various medical text and reference books. He was a member of The Boston Club of New Orleans.

== Family ==
Dr. Dyer was the nephew of Major Leon Dyer, U.S. Army & Army of the Republic of Texas.

On July 31, 1905, he married Mercedes Louise Percival. They had six children: Amelia Dyer (died age 12), Isadore Dyer Jr. MD, Alfred Dyer Sr., Mercedes Dyer, Donal Dyer, and John L. Dyer, MD.

== Death ==
He died in New Orleans of angina pectoris on October 12, 1920, and was interred in Metairie Cemetery.

== Sources ==
- The Handbook of Texas Online
