= Edmund Jean Forstall =

American banker and businessman

Edmond Jean Forstall
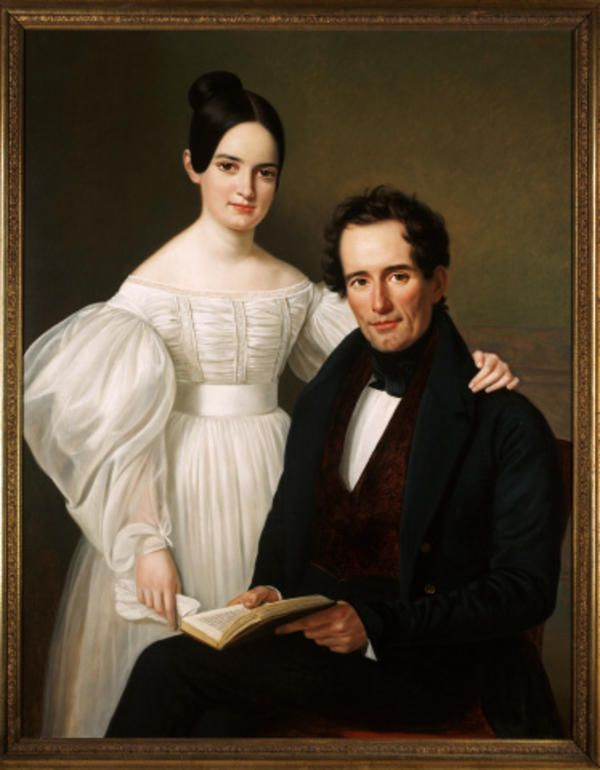
- Edmond Jean Forstall by Jean Joseph Vaudechamp

Personal details
- Born: 1794 New Orleans, New Spain
- Died: August 16, 1874 (aged 83–84) New Orleans, Louisiana, US
- Spouse: ()
- Occupation: Merchant, Planter & Banker

Edmund Jean Forstall (c. 1794-1874) was an American banker, merchant, and planter, from New Orleans, Louisiana, from a prominent Louisiana Creole family through his mother, and Irish heritage on his father's side. He is known for developing The Forstall System in 1842.

== Career ==
By 1818, through family connections, Forstall was a director of The Louisiana State Bank. He began his mercantile career with Gordon, Grant & Co. in the early 1820s, which then became Gordon, Forstall & Co. in 1826, where he managed the New Orleans Branch.

In 1838, Forstall became the president of Citizens Bank of Louisiana. In 1842, he developed The Forstall System which was a banking system used until the end of the Civil War.

=== Philanthropy ===
Forstall was an Administrator of the University of Louisiana under President William Newton Mercer, with Secretary Albert G. Blanchard, Chief Justice of the Louisiana Supreme Court Edwin T. Merrick, Mayor of New Orleans Charles M. Waterman, Admin Pierre Emile Bonford, and Admin Isadore Labatut, M.D.

== Forstall Mansion ==
Located at old No. 4 Carondolet Street, now 122, in the Central business district, the Forstall Mansion served as the home of The Boston Club from 1867 to 1884 and The Pickwick Club from 1894 to 1899. In 1856 he purchased 920 Saint Louis Street, then removed himself there.
