= The Pickwick Club =

New Orleans private gentlemen's club

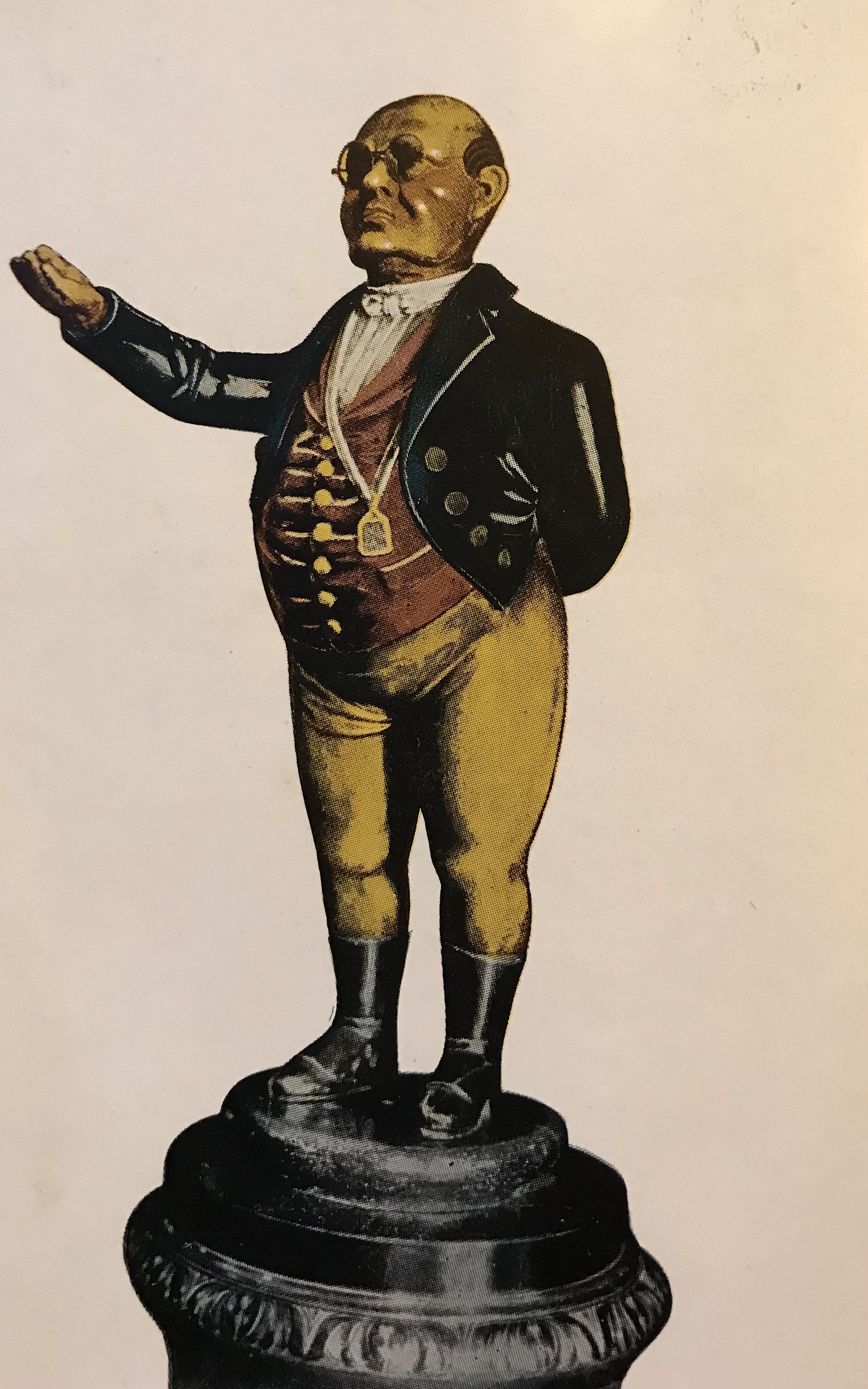
- Mr Pickwick Statue
- Founded: 1857; 169 years ago
- Location: 115 Saint Charles Ave New Orleans, Louisiana
- Coordinates: 29°57′10.7″N 90°04′10.3″W

The Pickwick Club is a private gentlemen's club in New Orleans, Louisiana. Founded in 1857, The Pickwick Club and the Mistick Krewe were originally one group comprising two organizations. After The Boston Club, The Pickwick Club is the second oldest remaining in the city.

The club is governed under laws for 501(c)(7) Social and Recreation Clubs; in 2025 it claimed $1,270,445 in revenue and $3,326,836 in assets.

== History ==
On February 8, 1857, a group of men who resided in the Anglo-American neighborhoods of New Orleans met in the Club Room of the Gem Saloon — a former residence of William Parker of Natchez — located at Old No. 17 Royal Street (127 Royal Street). Some of the group were former Orleans Club members. The idea was initially conceived at Pope's pharmacy on the corner of Jackson and Prytania. Six gentlemen (most originally from Mobile, Alabama) sent out an invitation to a select group of friends to meet at the Gem Saloon, where the first formal New Orleans carnival organization the Mistick Krewe of Comus was organized, and in June following within its ranks The Pickwick Club for the purpose of covering the mysteries and membership of the Mistick Krewe.

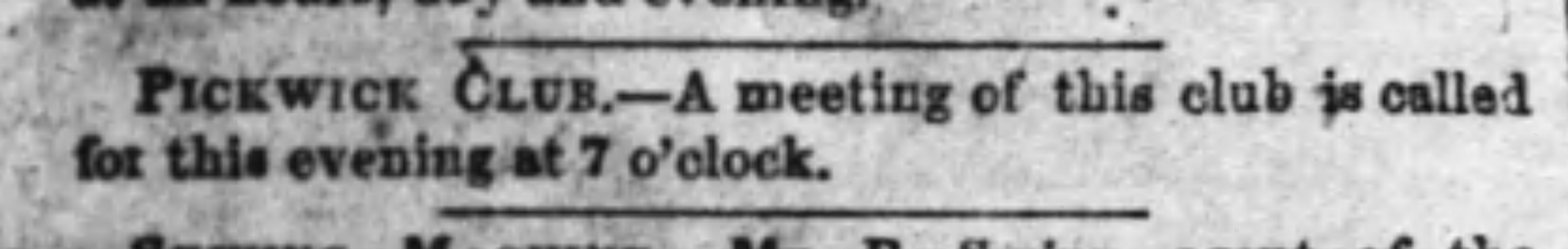
The Pickwick Club New Orleans, LA The Times Picayune Wed Apr 13 1859

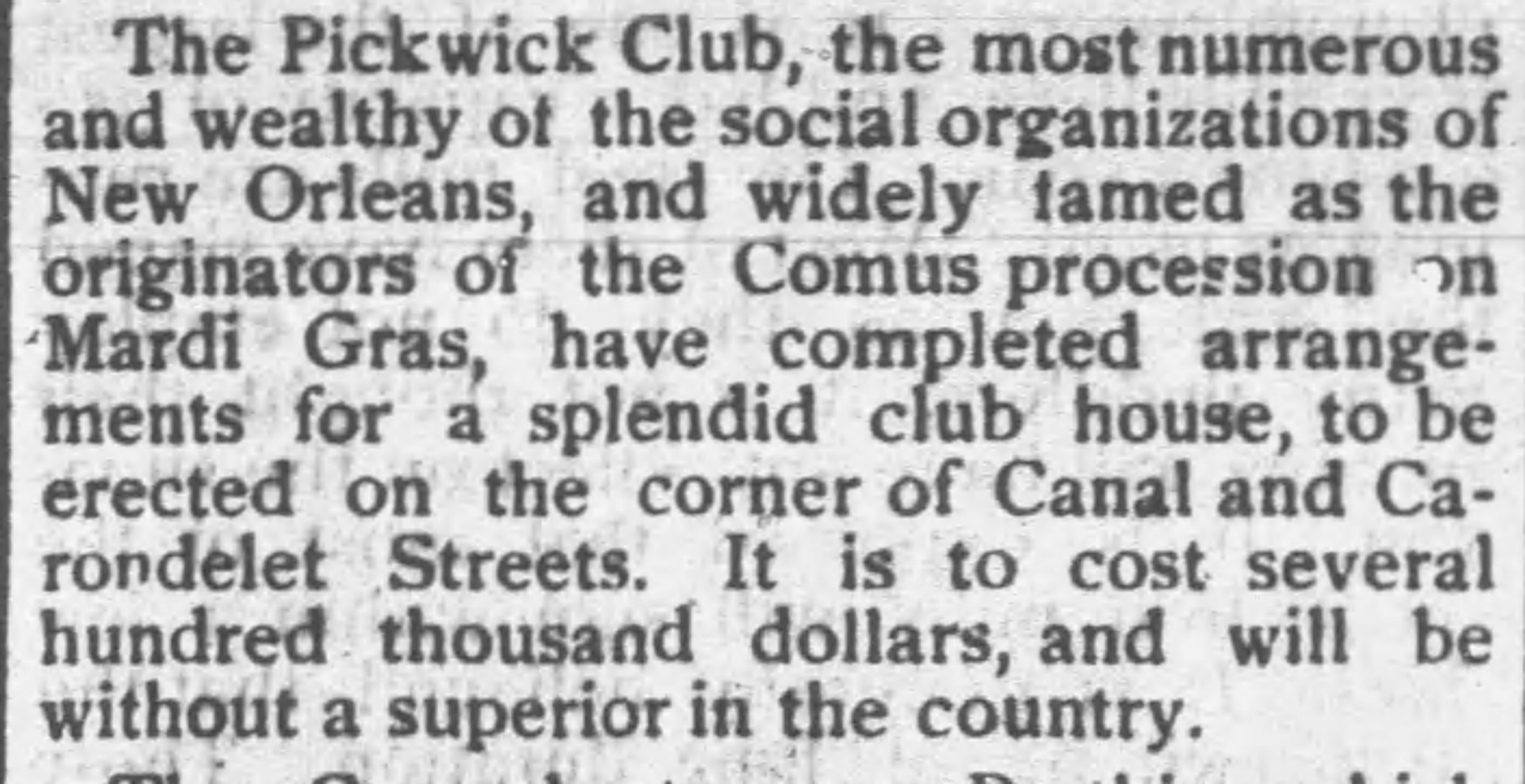
The Pickwick Club Comus New Orleans The Selma Times Fri Jun 2 1882

The Elkin Club, named after Harvey Elkin, was founded in 1832 by a group of Harvey's friends who purchased "Elkinville" after Mr. Elkin encountered financial difficulty, these men included John Slidell, John Randolph Grymes, and Glendy Burke; and was the first official private social club in New Orleans. An open club, members could freely invite guests, it sponsored dances and balls in the vicinity of Bayou St John and closed officially in 1838, due to the financial crisis of 1837.

The Pelican Club was founded in 1843, from the remnants of The Elkin Club, and folded at the beginning of the Civil War, confined its membership through blackball policies to bankers, cotton brokers, attorneys, physicians, and political leaders; the smallest lapse in credit spelled denial of membership. It was to this club Henry Clay and Gen. Winfield Scott would retire for respite.

Younger gentlemen, who had been rejected membership to the Pelican Club, organized The Orleans Club in 1851 with less restrictive membership policies but similarly closed during the Know Nothing Era. A few members of this club would later found The Pickwick Club, the city's second-oldest gentleman's club, who would influence the development of modern-day Mardi Gras.

The Pickwick, unlike the Boston Club, began as a "closed club," but evidence suggests before the turn of the 19th century the club allowed members to extend the club's hospitality to ladies and out-of-town guests during Carnival. These parade-viewing parties continue to the present day.

=== Notable members ===
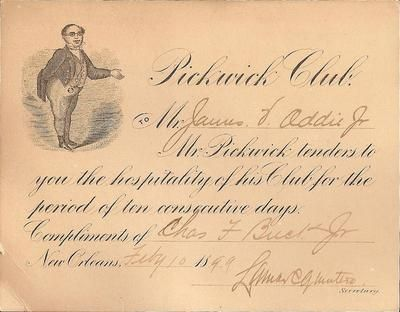
Pickwick Club Carnival Pass 1899

- Lloyd Dulany Addison, Founding Member, Descended from Maryland Gentry Families such as the Lloyd's of Wye House, Dulaney's of Anne Arundel County, Maryland, and later Welbourne, and the Oxon Hill Manor Addison's.
- Adley H. Gladden, First President, was a lieutenant colonel and second commander of the Palmetto Regiment of South Carolina volunteers during the Mexican–American War and a brigadier general in the Confederate States Army during the American Civil War.
- Albert Walter Merriam was a lieutenant colonel in the Louisiana Confederate Military. He built and owned the Crescent Hall.
- William J. Behan, was an American Confederate veteran and politician. He served as the 41st mayor of New Orleans (November 20, 1882 – April 28, 1884).
- Edward Douglass White, American politician and jurist, was a United States Senator and the ninth Chief Justice of the United States. He served on the Supreme Court of the United States from 1894 to 1921. He is best known for formulating the Rule of reason standard of antitrust law.
- Harry T. Hays was an American Army officer serving in the Mexican–American War and a general who served in the Confederate Army during the American Civil War.
- Paul Capdevielle was mayor of New Orleans, Louisiana, from May 9, 1900, to December 5, 1904.
- Charles de Choiseul, Confederate States Army officer during the American Civil War serving under Harry T. Hays; son of Count Marie Joseph Gabriel St. Xavier de Choiseul, cousin to King Louis-Phillippe XV and French Consul in Charleston, SC, and Savannah, GA. Lawyer in New Orleans and a militiaman, active in the French Creole community.
- Dr. Robert Tayloe Cook V, MD, FFV. His great uncle, Henry Augustine Tayloe, founded the Fair Grounds in 1838 with Mandeville de Marigny. Doctor of radiology at Baptist Hospital and past president of the Louisiana SNMMI.

== Homes of The Pickwick Club ==
- Tchoupitoulas Street just above Poydras Street, 1857 – January 1858
- No. 57 St. Charles Street, just beyond Gravier Street, 1858–1865
- The corner of Canal and Exchange Alley Streets, 1865–1881
- 148 Canal Street (Today, 824 Canal Street-The Boston Club), 1881–1882
- The corner of Canal and Carondelet Streets, 1882–1894 "Pickwick Palace"
- Old No. 4 Carondolet, now 122, 1894–1899 (The Forstall Mansion)
- 1030 Canal Street 1899–1934
- Unknown 1934–1950
- The Crescent City Billiard Hall, corner of Canal St and St Charles Ave, 1950–present
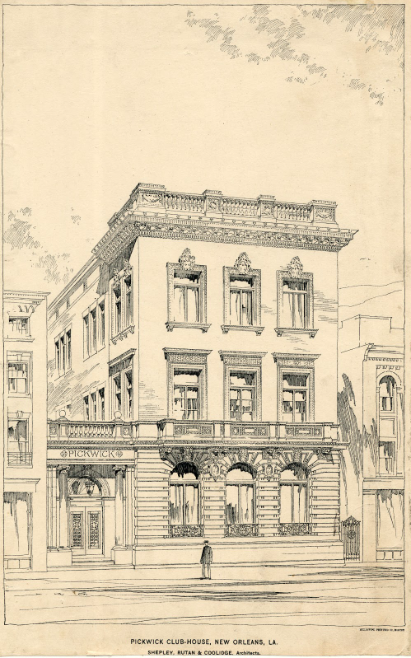
Pickwick Club-House, 1030 Canal Street, New Orleans, LA. (1896)

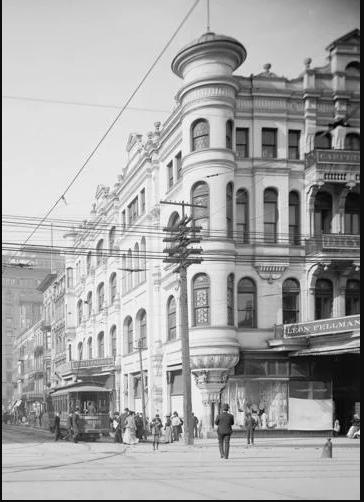
Pickwick Palace, Canal at Carondelet, 1882–1894

== Gallery ==
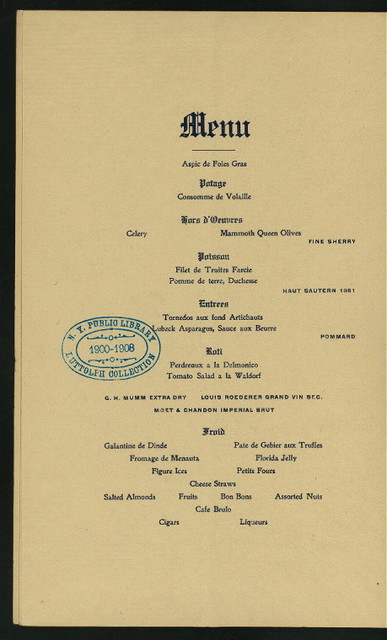
Pickwick Club New Orleans Dinner Menu

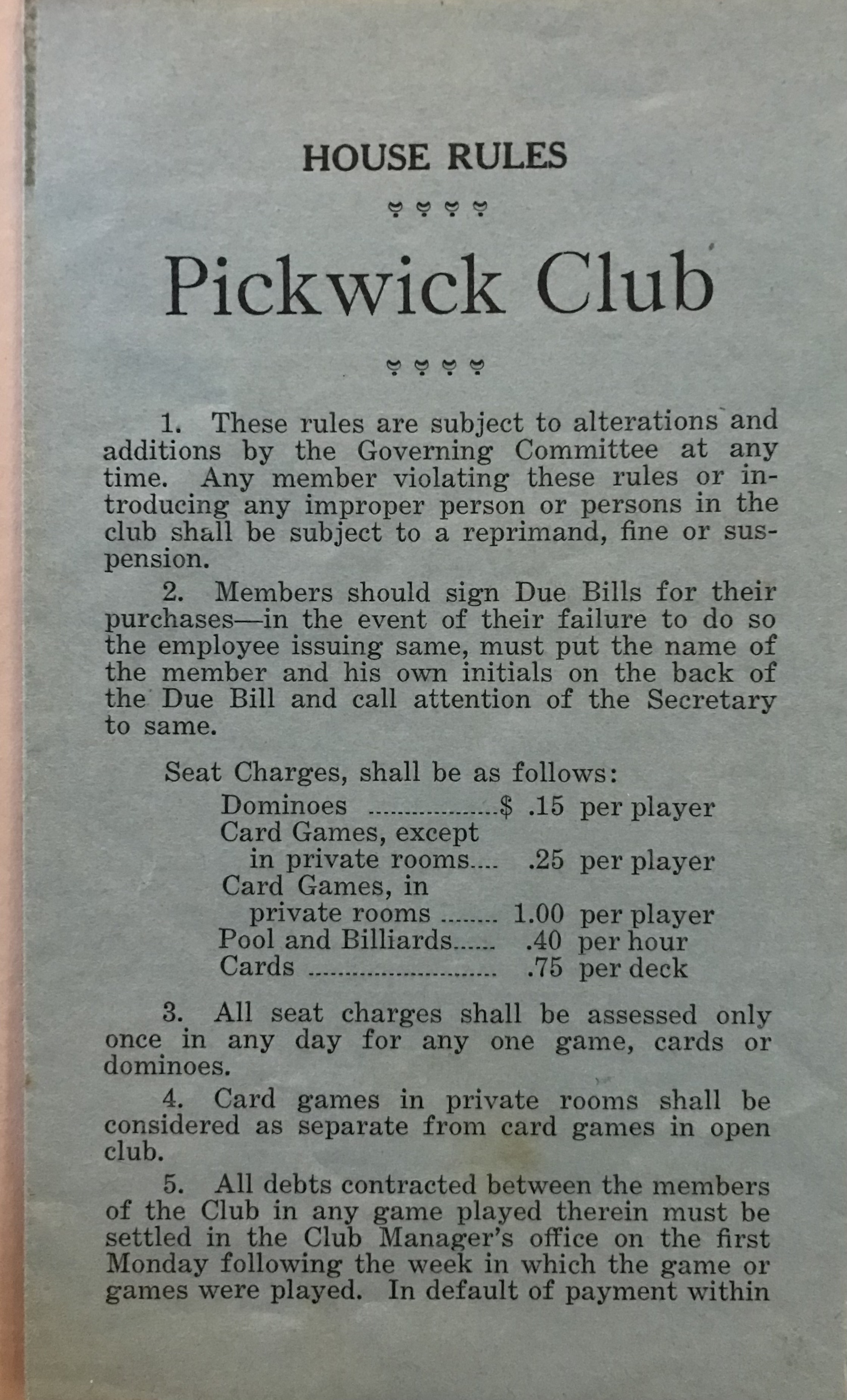
Pickwick Club Rules 1929

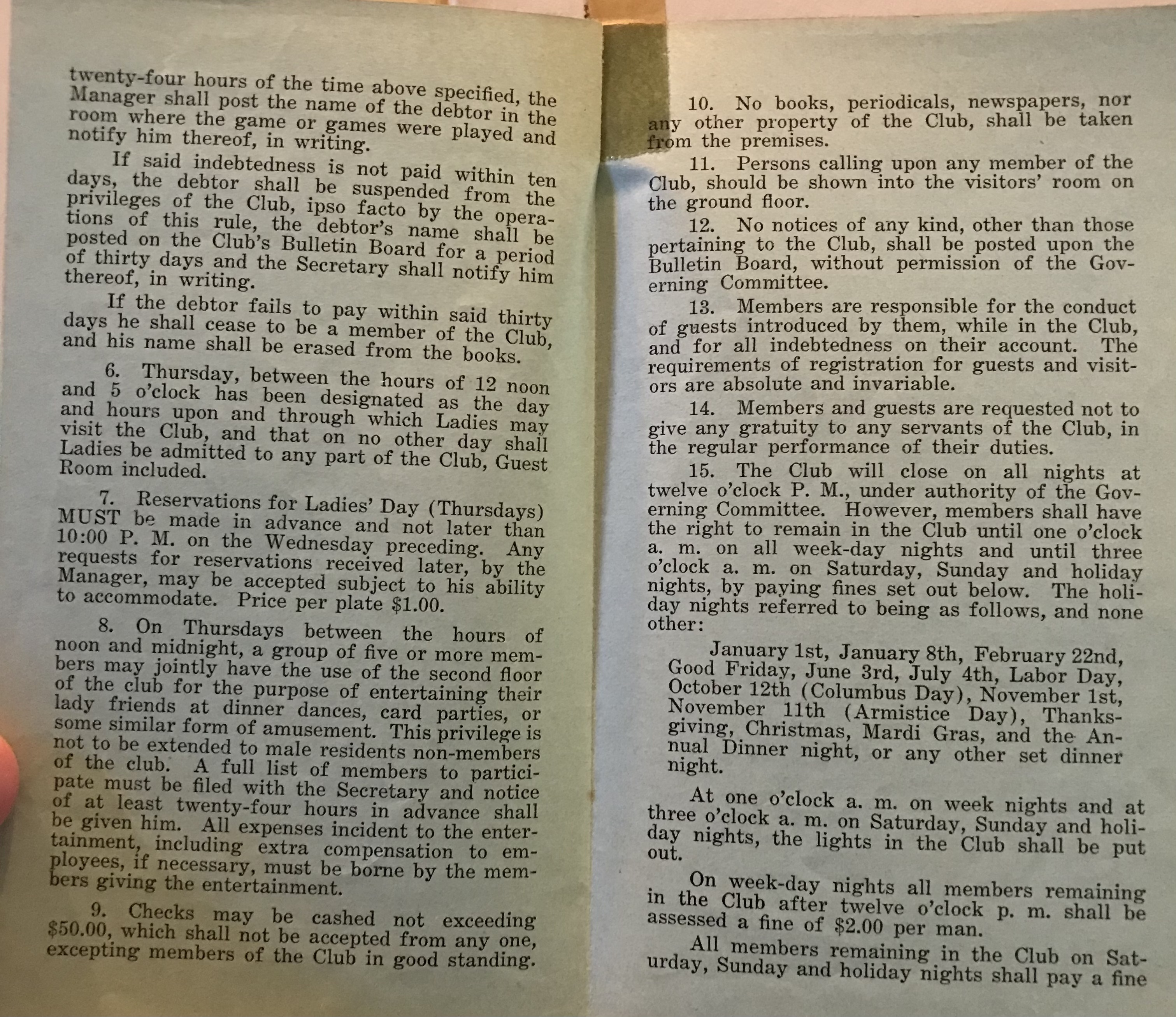
Pickwick Club Rules 1929

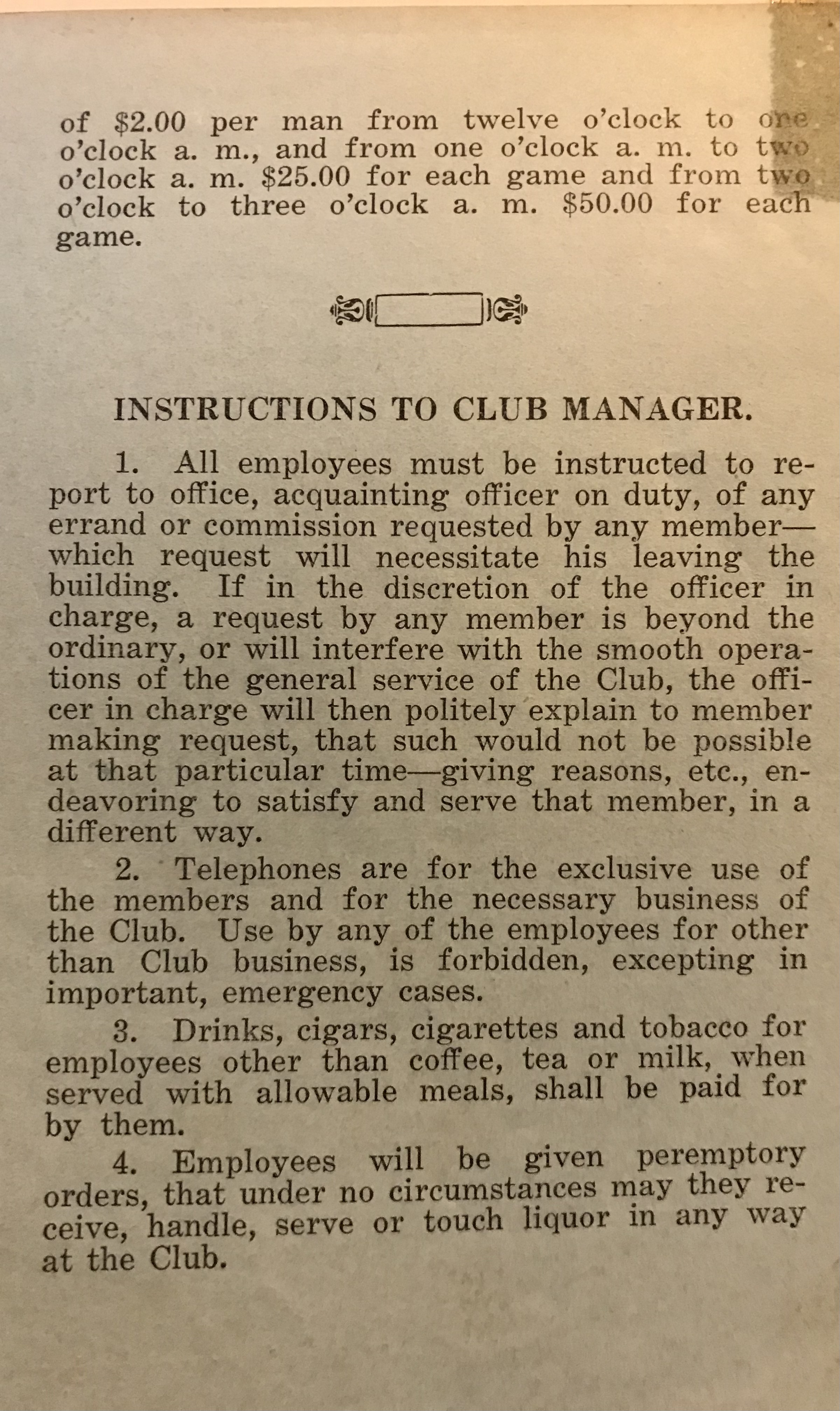
Pickwick Club Rules 1929

== See also ==
- The Boston Club
- List of gentlemen's clubs in the United States
- Mistick Krewe
