= Paul C. P. McIlhenny =

Paul C. P. McIlhenny (March 19, 1944 – February 23, 2013) was an American businessman and executive at family-owned McIlhenny Company, maker of Tabasco sauce and other Tabasco brand products at Avery Island, Louisiana.

Although strongly associated with Louisiana, particularly Avery Island and New Orleans, McIlhenny was born in Houston, Texas. He joined Tabasco operations in 1967, serving over the years in many different departments of the company. He spearheaded the idea of selling Tabasco-branded items, such as T-shirts, watches, aprons, golf balls, salt shakers, and neckties.

McIlhenny became president of McIlhenny Company in 1998 and remained in the post until 2012, when he stepped down to replace his late cousin, Edward "Ned" McIlhenny Simmons, as chairman of the board. McIlhenny retained the office of CEO, however, while another cousin, Tony Simmons, became president and COO.

McIlhenny died in New Orleans, Louisiana, on February 23, 2013. He was a member of The Boston Club.
