= The Boston Club =

Gentlemen's club in New Orleans, Louisiana, US

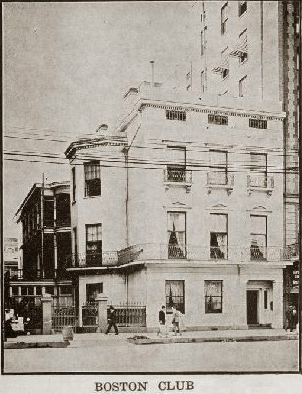
- The Boston Club of New Orleans, Dr. William Newton Mercer House
- Founded: 1841; 185 years ago
- Location: 824 Canal Street New Orleans, Louisiana
- Coordinates: 29°57′14.2″N 90°04′14.1″W
- Remarks: built by architect James Gallier

The Boston Club is an exclusive private gentlemen's club in New Orleans, Louisiana, US, founded in 1841 as a place for its white members to congregate and partake in the fashionable card game of Boston. It is the third oldest City Club in the United States, after the Philadelphia Club (1834) and Union Club of the City of New York (1836).

The Boston Club of New Orleans operates under laws for 501(c)(7) Social and Recreation Clubs; in 2025 it claimed total revenue of $1,652,188 and total assets of $3,921,134, both increases over 2024.

The clubhouse has been located at 824 Canal Street since 1884, formerly 148 Canal St, on the edge of the Central Business District. It was designed and built in 1844 by James Gallier as a city residence for Dr. William N. Mercer, a Maryland native, University of Pennsylvania School of Medicine trained surgeon, and veteran of the War of 1812 posted in New Orleans then Natchez, Mississippi, where he married Ann Eliza Farar, daughter of Benjamin Farar Jr., whose dowry included Laurel Hill and Ellis Cliffs, Mississippi, by way of her mother, the heiress of Richard Ellis (Mississippi planter), who with his brother John, for their loyalty to the crown during the American Revolution, received the original 20,000 acres royal English land grant.

The club was organized by thirty leading mercantile, professional, and criminal men fond of the card game Boston from which the club was named.

== History ==
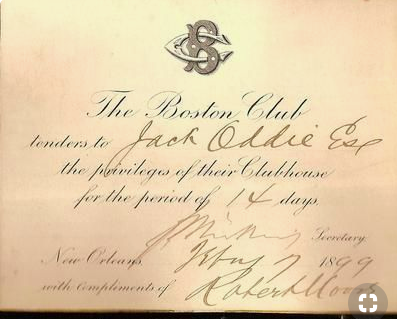
Boston Club Pass 1899

Founded in 1841, members organized and rented rooms first at the Merchants Exchange, 126 Royal St, in the Vieux Carre, then 129/130 Canal Street until the Civil War when it closed from 1862 to 1866. After the war, it occupied 214 Royal Street (currently the Hotel Monteleone) until 1867 at which point it moved to 4 Carondelet Street, the former home of New Orleans financier, Edmund Jean Forstall. In 1884 it moved into its current clubhouse at 824 Canal Street (then known as 148 Canal Street) and the house was fully purchased by 1905. The club was closed for 3 years during the Civil War.

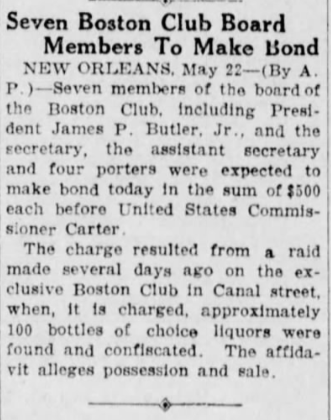
Boston Club of New Orleans May 24, 1924

The History of Gentlemen's Clubs in New Orleans starts with The Elkin Club, named after Harvey Elkin, was founded in 1832 by a group of Harvey's friends who purchased "Elkinville" after Mr. Elkin encountered financial difficulty, these men included John Slidell, John Randolph Grymes, and Glendy Burke. It was the first official private social club in New Orleans. An open club, members could freely invite guests, it sponsored dances and balls in the vicinity of Bayou St John and closed officially in 1838, due to the financial crisis of 1837. Next was The Pelican Club, founded in 1843 from the remnants of The Elkin Club, and folded at the beginning of the Civil War. It confined its membership through blackball policies to bankers, cotton brokers, attorneys, physicians, and political leaders; the smallest lapse in credit spelled denial of membership. It was to this club Henry Clay and Gen. Winfield Scott would retire for respite. Younger gentlemen, who had been rejected membership to the Pelican Club, organized The Orleans Club in 1851 with less restrictive membership policies but similarly closed, during the Know Nothing Times. A few members of this club would later found The Pickwick Club, the city's second-oldest gentleman's club, who would influence the development of modern-day Mardi Gras.

Unlike The Pickwick Club or Louisiana Club, the Boston Club was not initially a "closed club" and was more diverse. Members could invite guests into the club freely where they could use the premises "gratis", though in the traditional club style new members were put up through a blackball process. A few Jewish men, such as Judah P. Benjamin and the first Rex, Lewis Solomon, had been members of the club in its earlier days. Eventually, however, the club became almost exclusively Anglo-American as racial attitudes in New Orleans hardened after the Civil War and even white minorities would be blackballed leading to an air of antisemitism, especially with the rise of the Crescent City White League. For his merits early in his career Edgar B. Stern was invited to join. Stern declined the invitation on learning that close Jewish friends would be unable to join. The Boston Club has no reciprocal relationships with any national or international gentlemen's clubs, unlike its older siblings: The Philadelphia Club and The Union Club of New York; or other revered national societal institutions such as the Metropolitan Club in Washington, D.C.

== Famous guests ==
- In 1873, Archibald Primrose, 5th Earl of Rosebery attended a luncheon.
- General Ulysses S. Grant lunched at The Boston Club in 1880.
- Oscar Wilde visited the club in Summer of 1882 while on tour and was made an honorary member. He gave a lecture at the Grand Opera House on Canal Street on "Decorative Art".
- John J. Pershing visited on February 17, 1920.
- The Duke of Windsor and the Duchess of Windsor, February 21, 1950
- It was customary, until 1992, for Rex (King of Carnival) and his queen to lunch at the club after the Rex parade during Mardi Gras. In addition, the Boston Club entertained the queen of the carnival and her court during the parade.

== Notable members ==
- Daniel Weisiger Adams
- Judah P. Benjamin, QC
- Edward A. Bradford, president 1851-1857
- Edwin S. Broussard
- Robert F. Broussard
- Eaton J. Bowers
- Charles Cordill
- Victor Burthe, president 1866–1868
- Dr. Robert Tayloe Cook V, FFV
- Isaac Delgado
- James Temple Doswell, president 1857–1859
- Garnett Duncan
- Stephen Duncan
- Isadore Dyer
- James B. Eustis
- Charles E. Fenner, president 1892–1904
- Murphy J. Foster
- John Hamilton Fulton
- Randall L. Gibson
- John Randolph Grymes Jr., FFV, Founding Member
- Harry T. Hays
- Col. John Hewlett, president 1841–1852
- Carleton Hunt
- William H. Hunt
- Ernest L. Jahncke
- Bradish Johnson
- Benjamin F. Jonas
- John H. Kennard
- Hugh Kennedy (New Orleans)
- Samuel Horton Kennedy, president 1859-1861
- Duncan F. Kenner
- Arthur Pendleton Mason, FFV, president 1880-1883
- Ernest S. Lewis, president 1904-1913
- Florenz Albrecht Luling
- Samuel D. McEnery
- Paul C. P. McIlhenny
- Edwin T. Merrick president 1930-1932
- Henry C. Miller
- John Albert Morris
- Abraham Myers
- Francis T. Nicholls
- Alton Ochsner
- Don Albert Pardee
- John M. Parker
- Davidson Bradfute Penn
- LeRoy Percy
- Walker Percy, Obl.S.B.
- Felix Pierre Poché
- James Robb
- Thomas Jenkins Semmes, president 1883–1892
- John Slidell
- Pierre Soule, Founding Member
- Henry M. Spofford
- James B. Steedman
- Richard "Dick" Taylor, FFV, president 1868–1873
- T. Semmes Walmsley
- John Barnett Waterman
- Edward Douglas White
- Maunsel White

=== Portrait Gallery ===
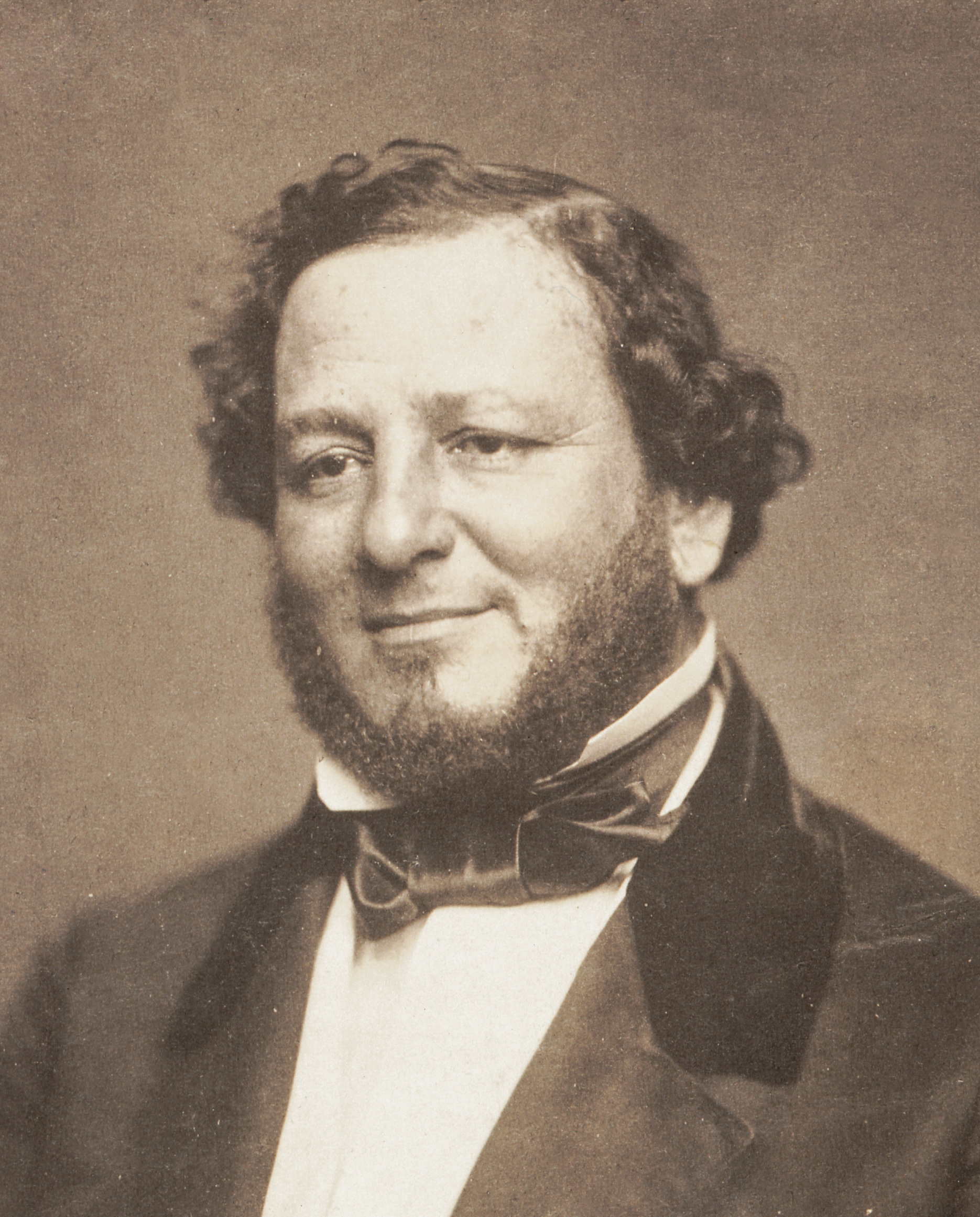
Judah Benjamin, QC

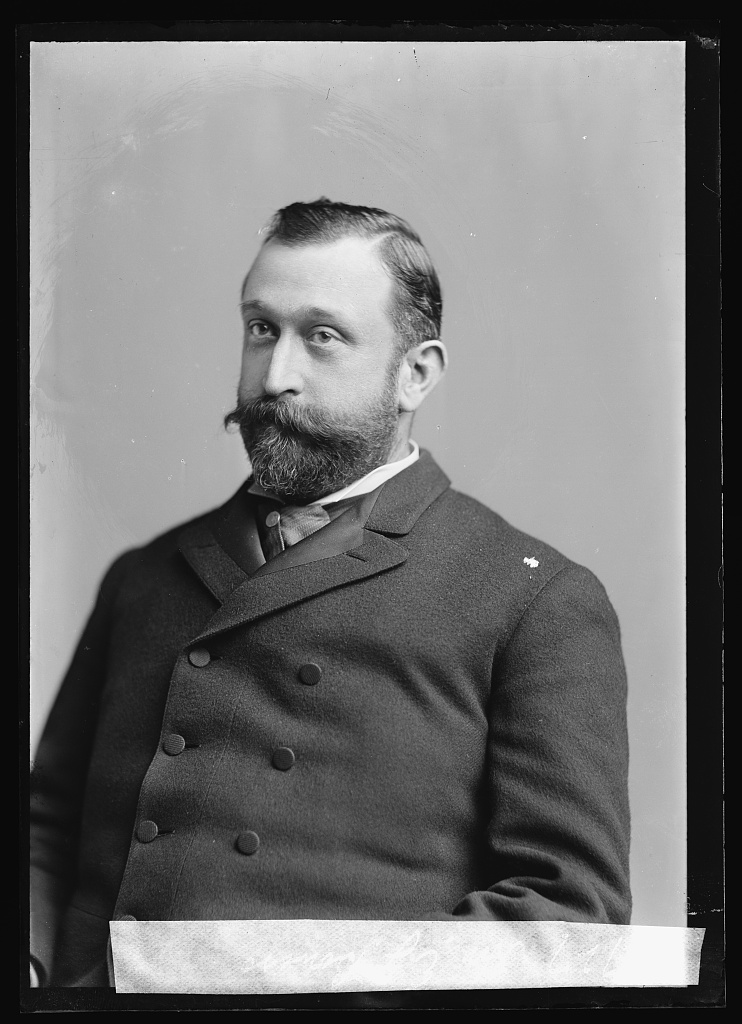
Eaton J. Bowers

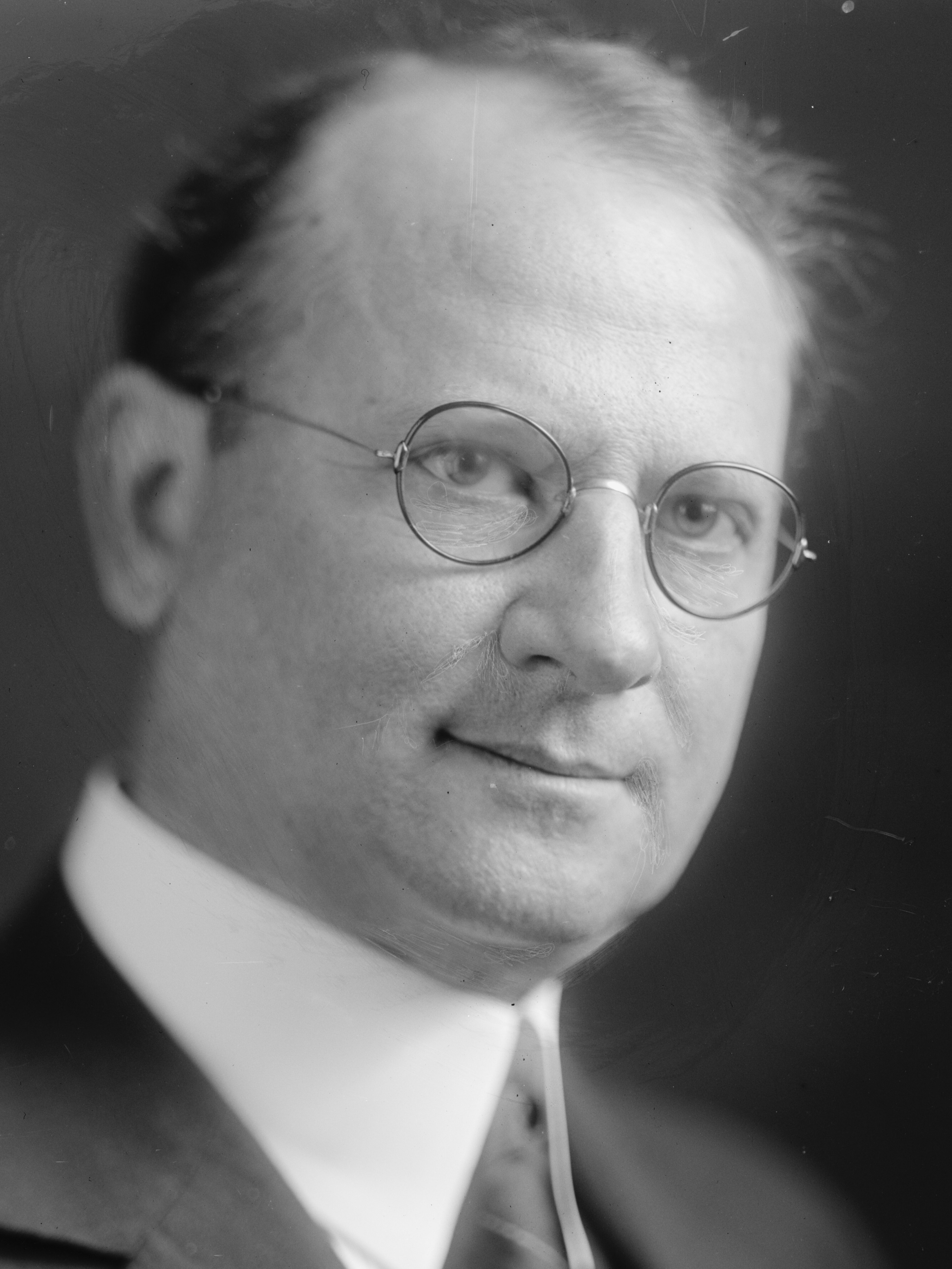
US Senator Edwin S. Broussard

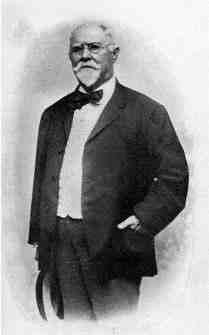
Issac Delgato

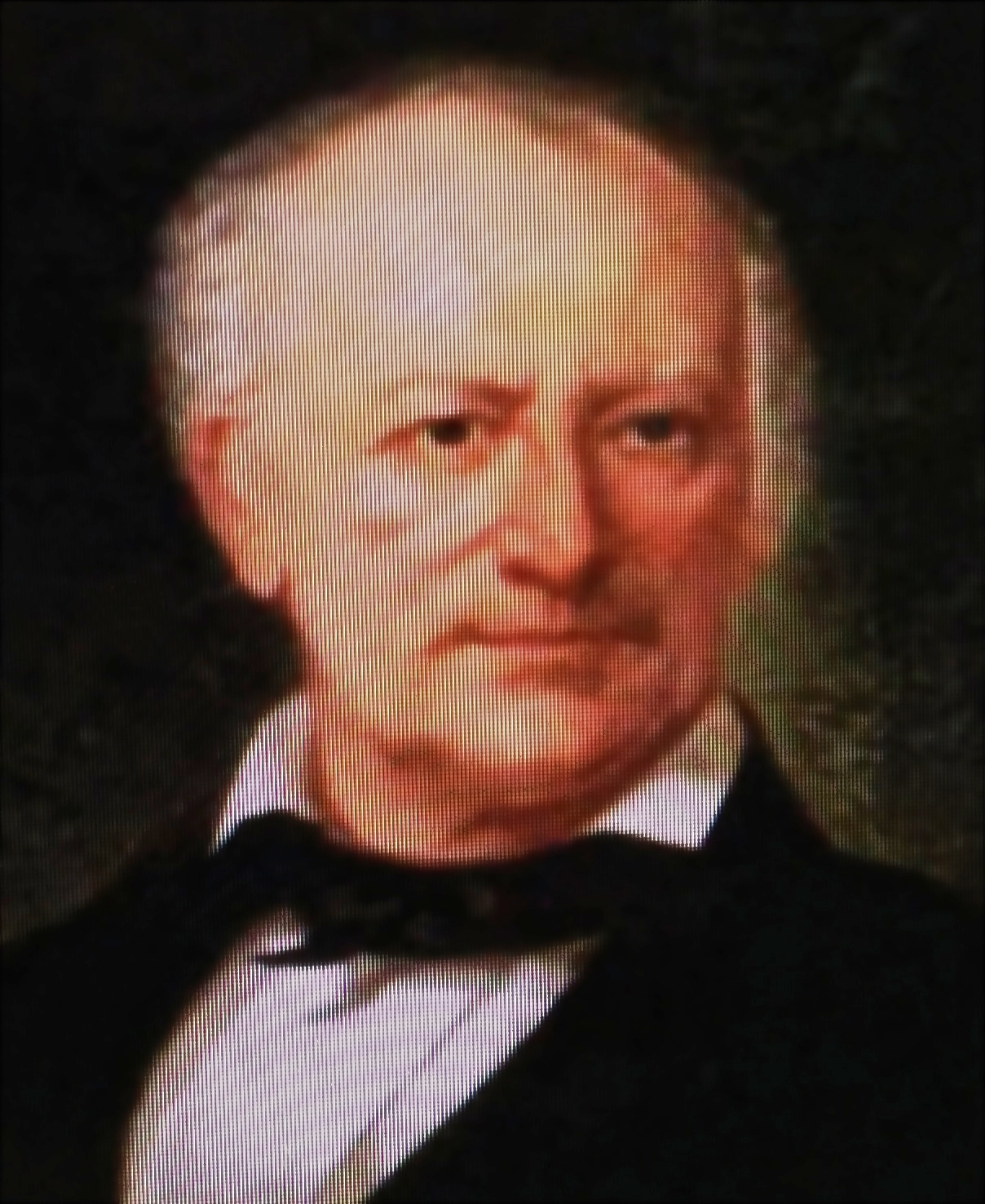
Stephen Duncan

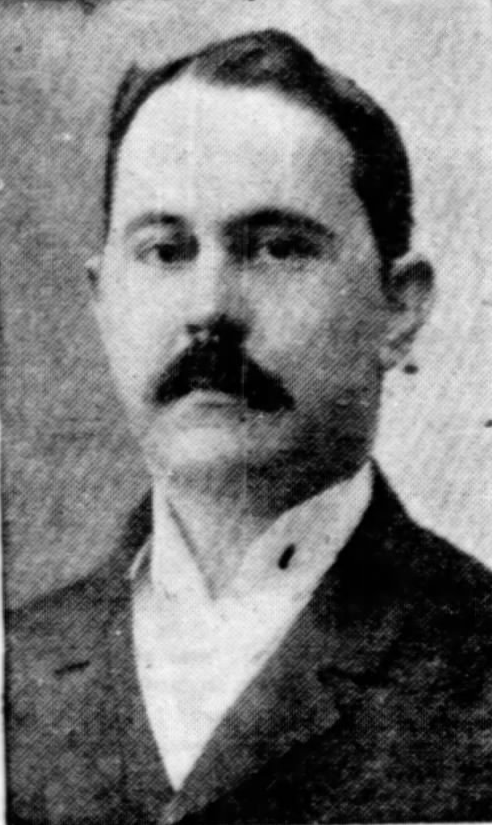
Dr. Isadore Dyer

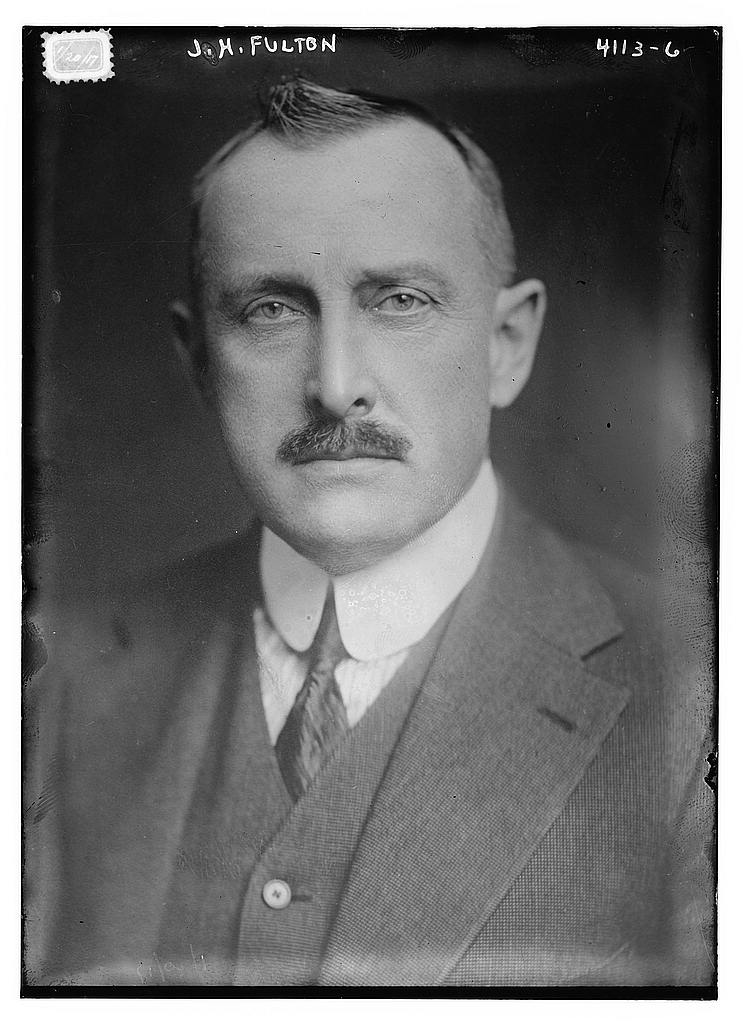
J.H. Fulton

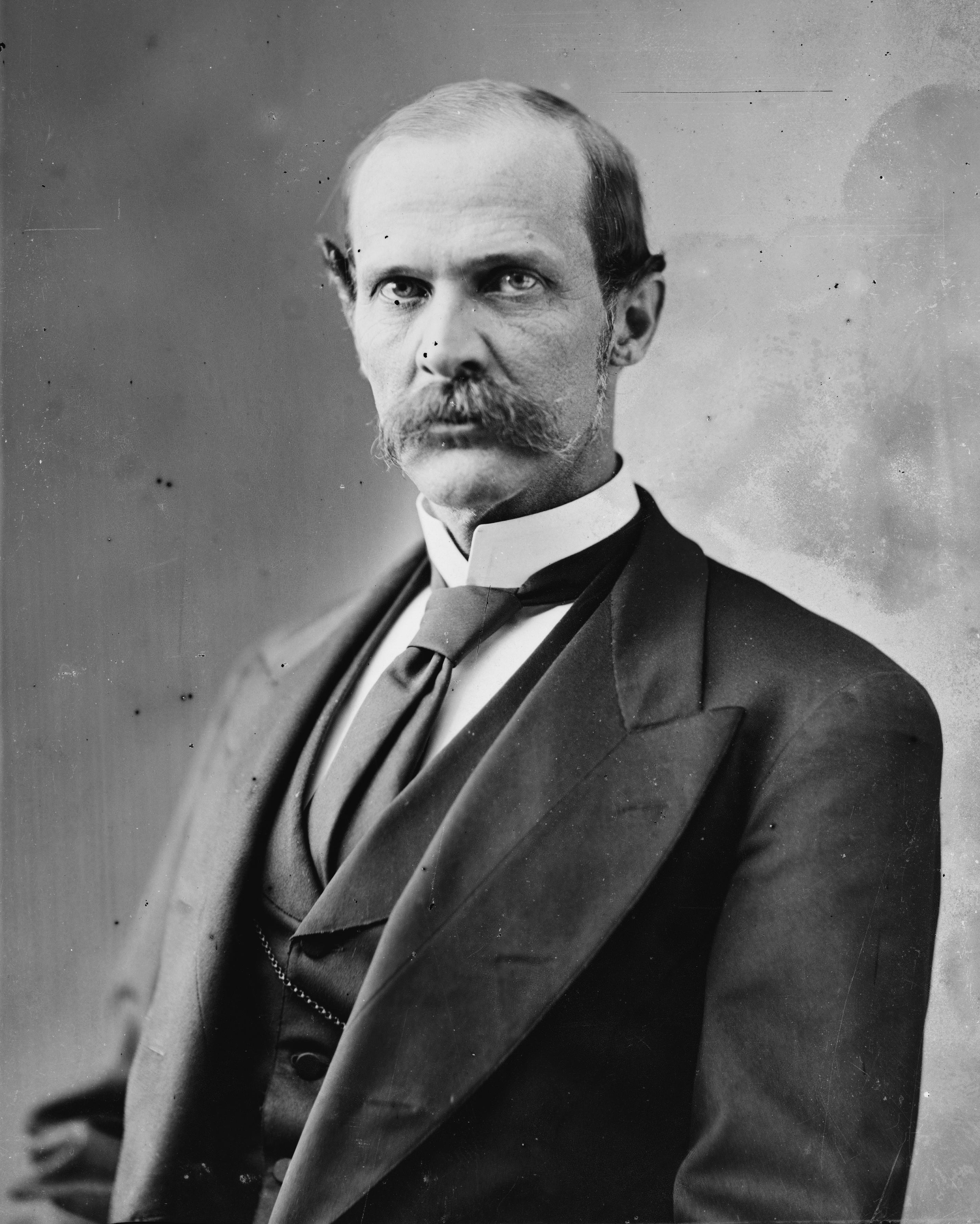
US Senator Randall L. Gibson

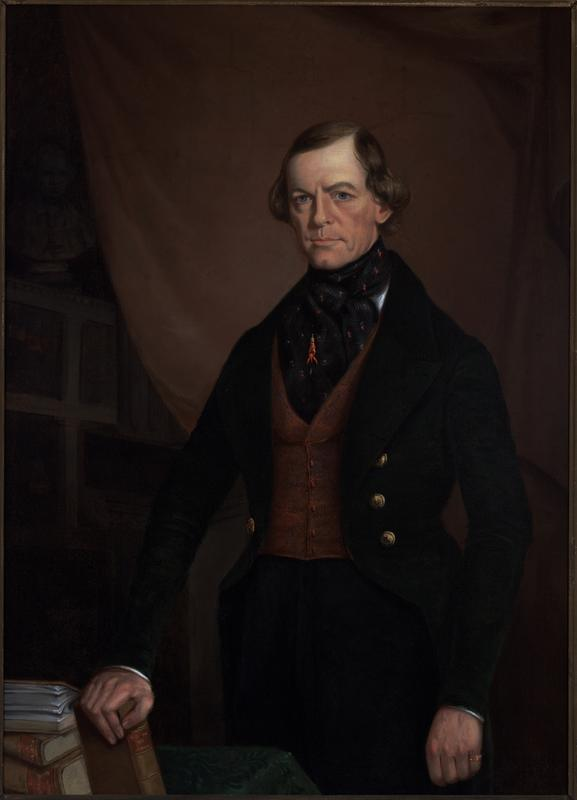
John Randolph Grymes

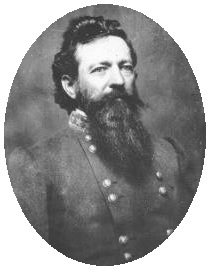
Harry Thompson Hays

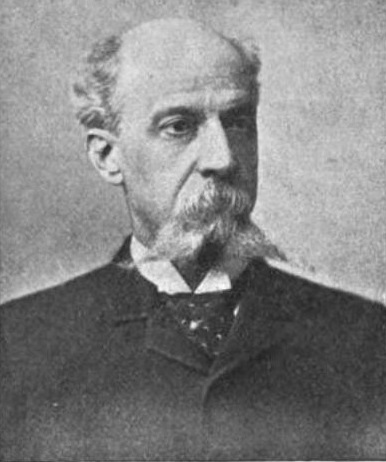
US Congressman Carleton Hunt

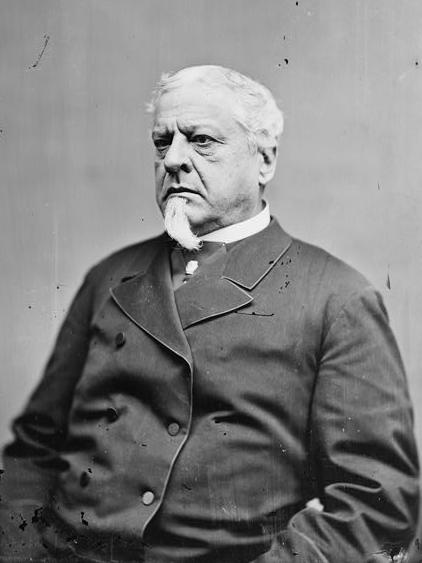
Sec of Navy William Henry Hunt

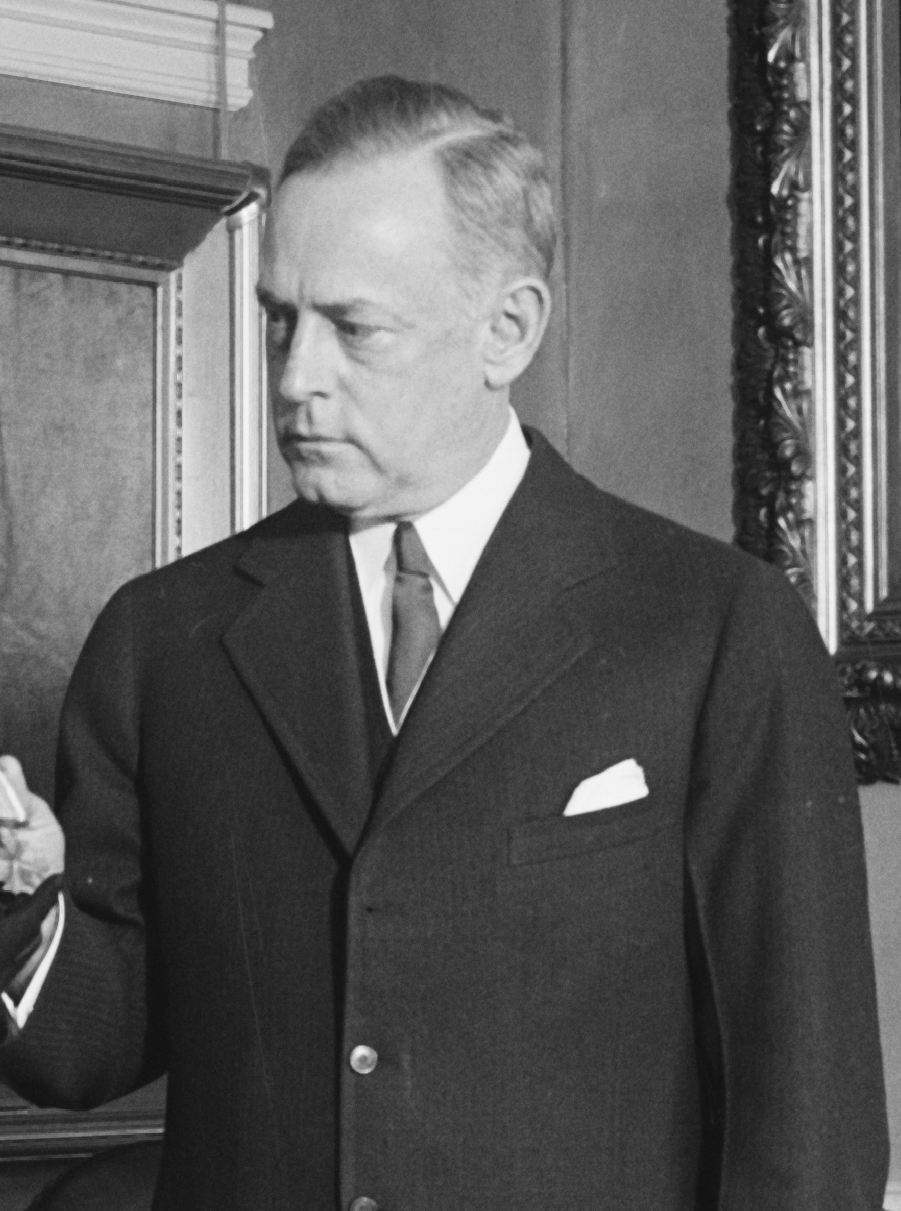
Sec of Navy Ernest L. Jahncke

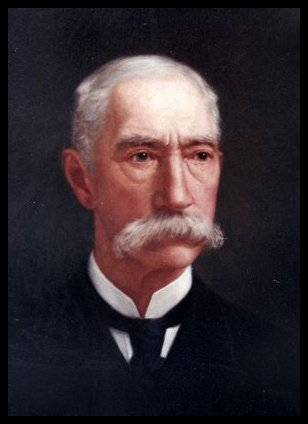
Bradish Johnson

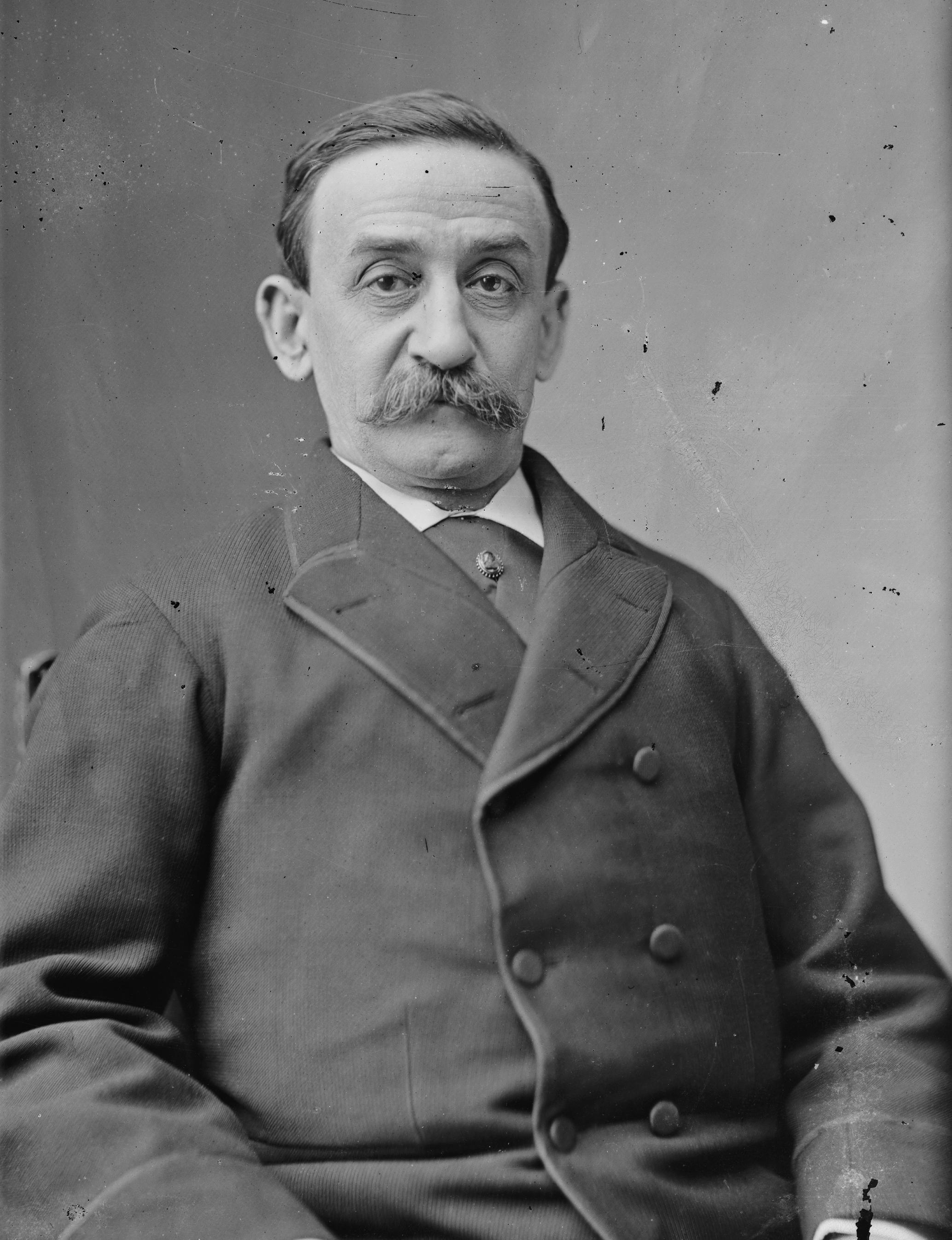
US Senator Benjamin Franklin Jonas

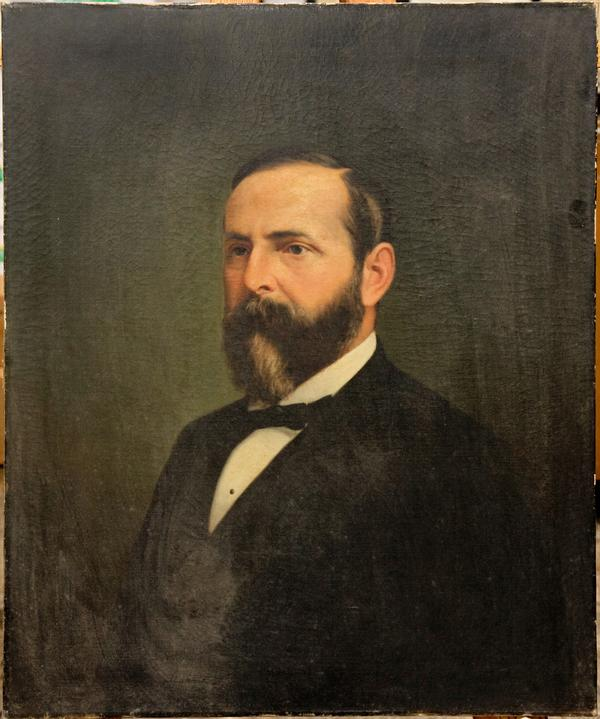
Louisiana Justice John Hanson Kennard

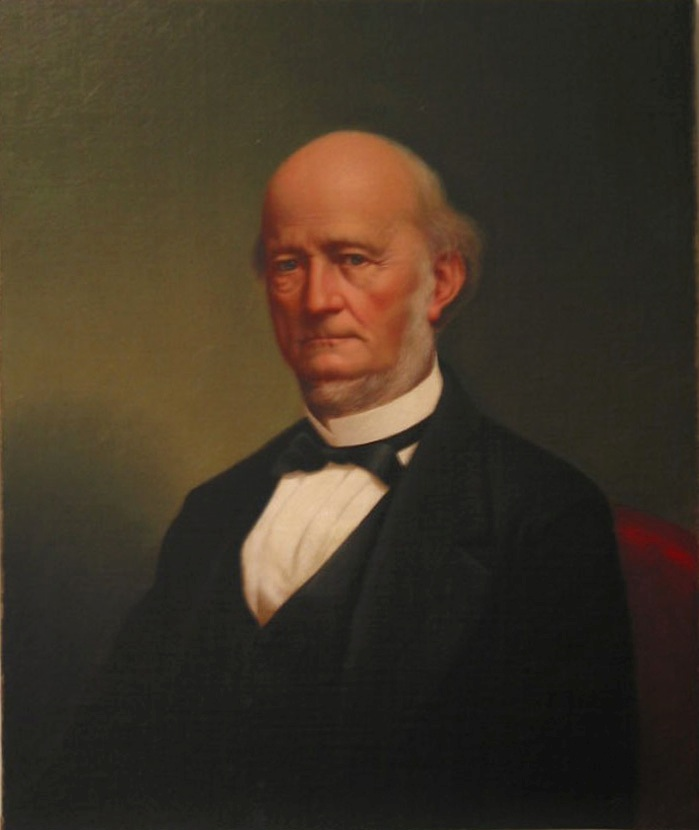
Duncan Kenner

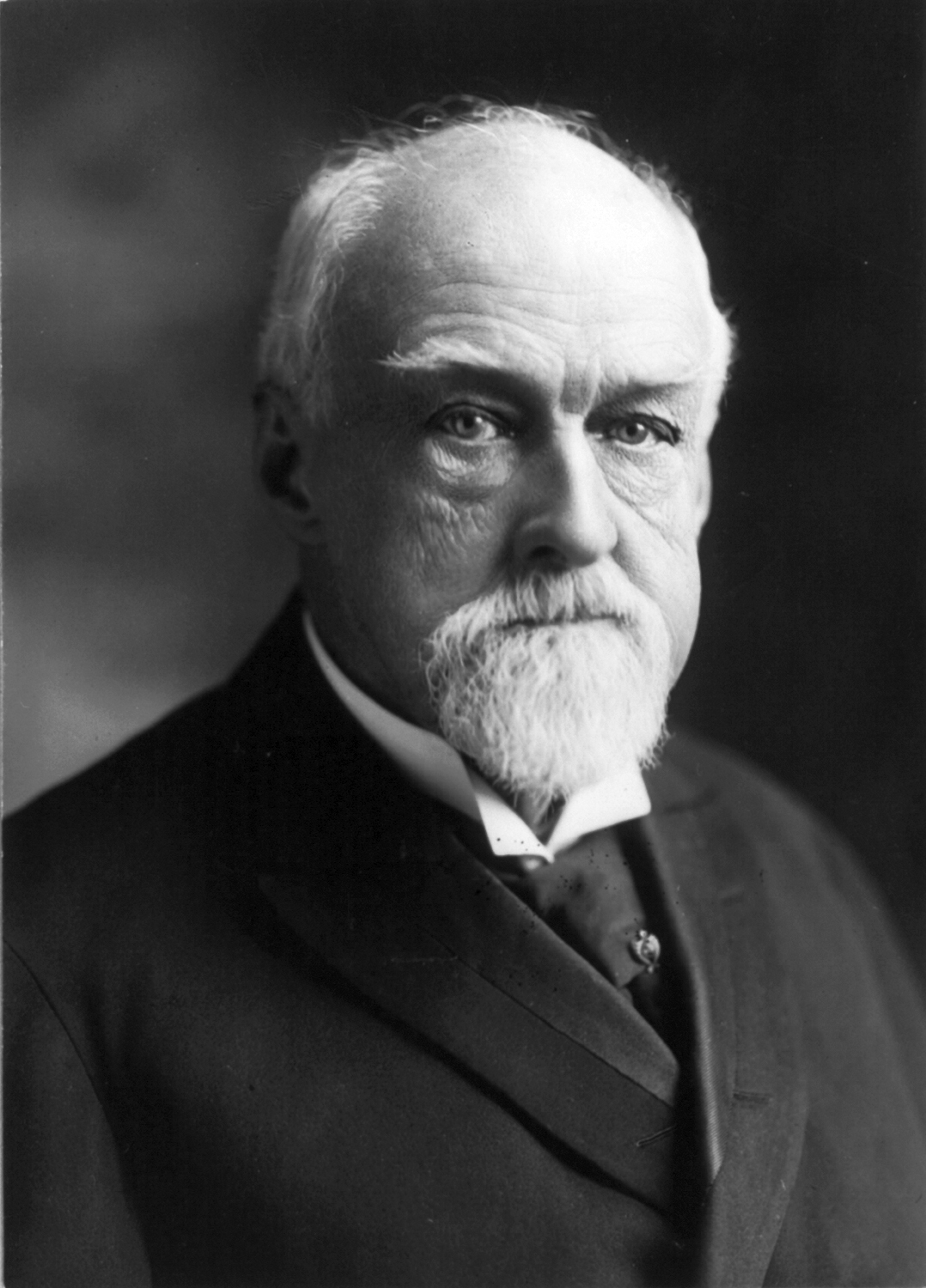
LA Gov. Samuel Douglas McEnery

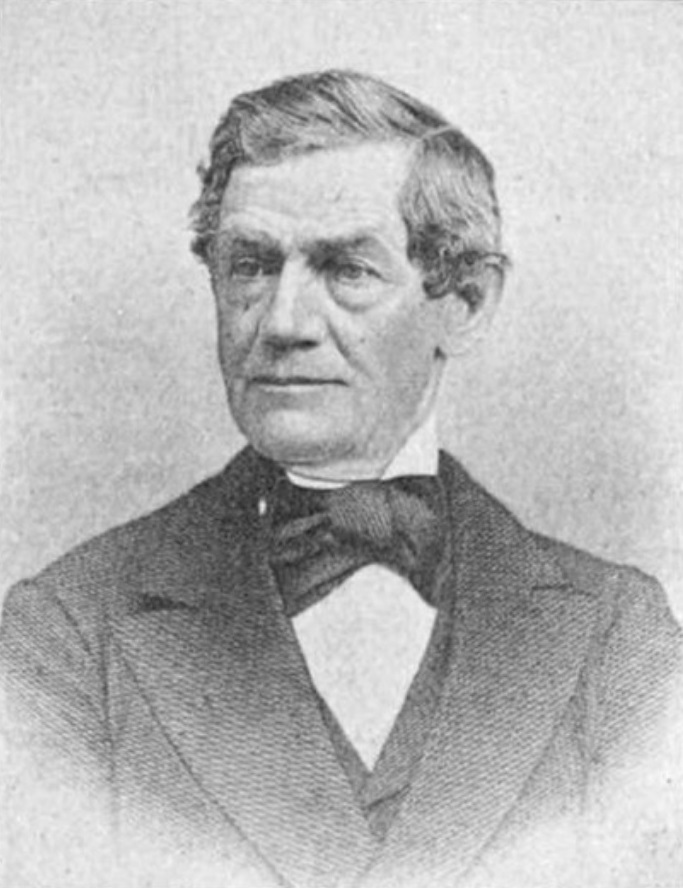
Louisiana Justice Edwin T. Merrick

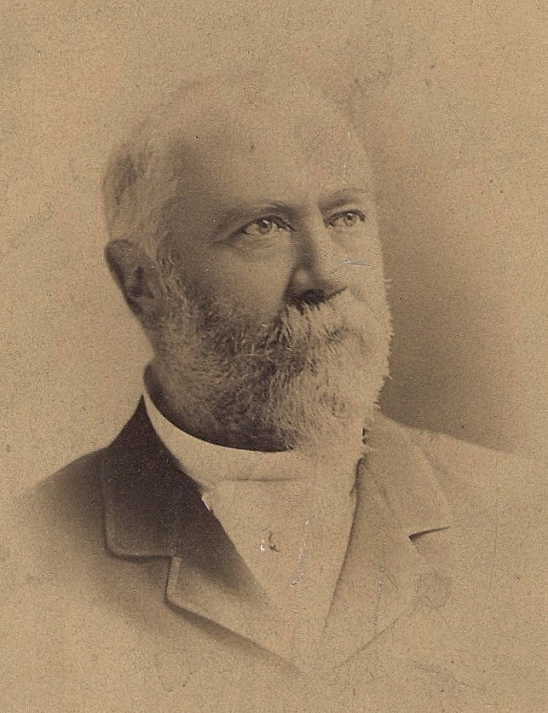
John Albert Morris

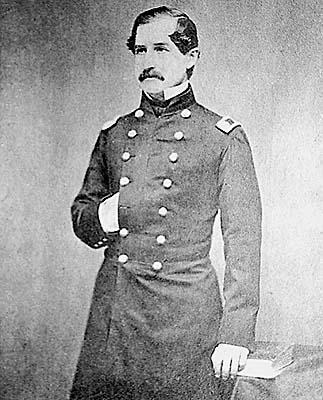
Abraham Myers

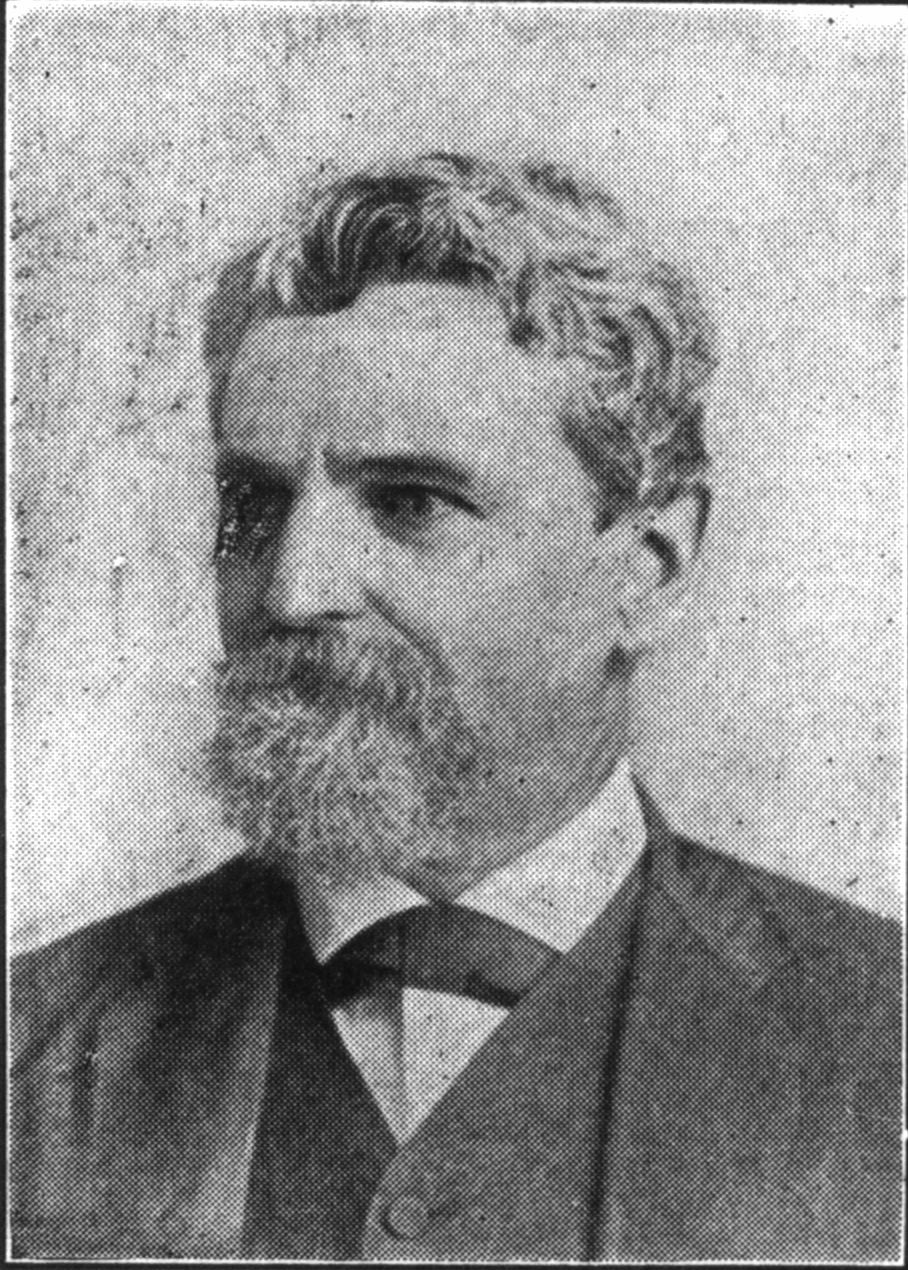
LA Gov. Francis Redding Tillou Nicholls

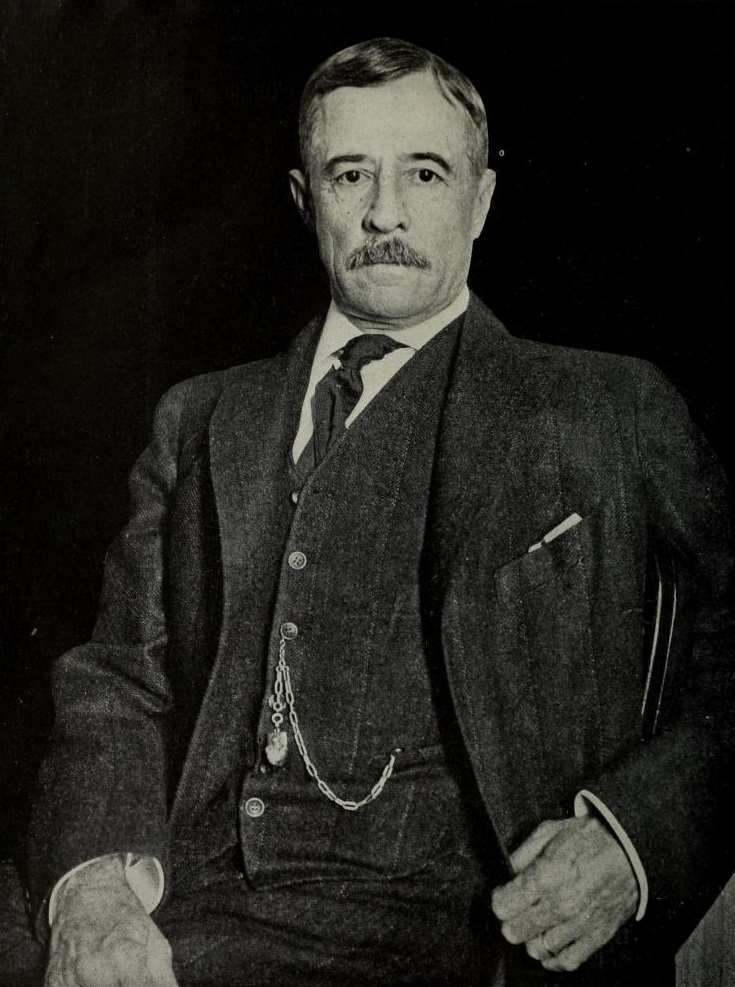
LA Gov. John M. Parker

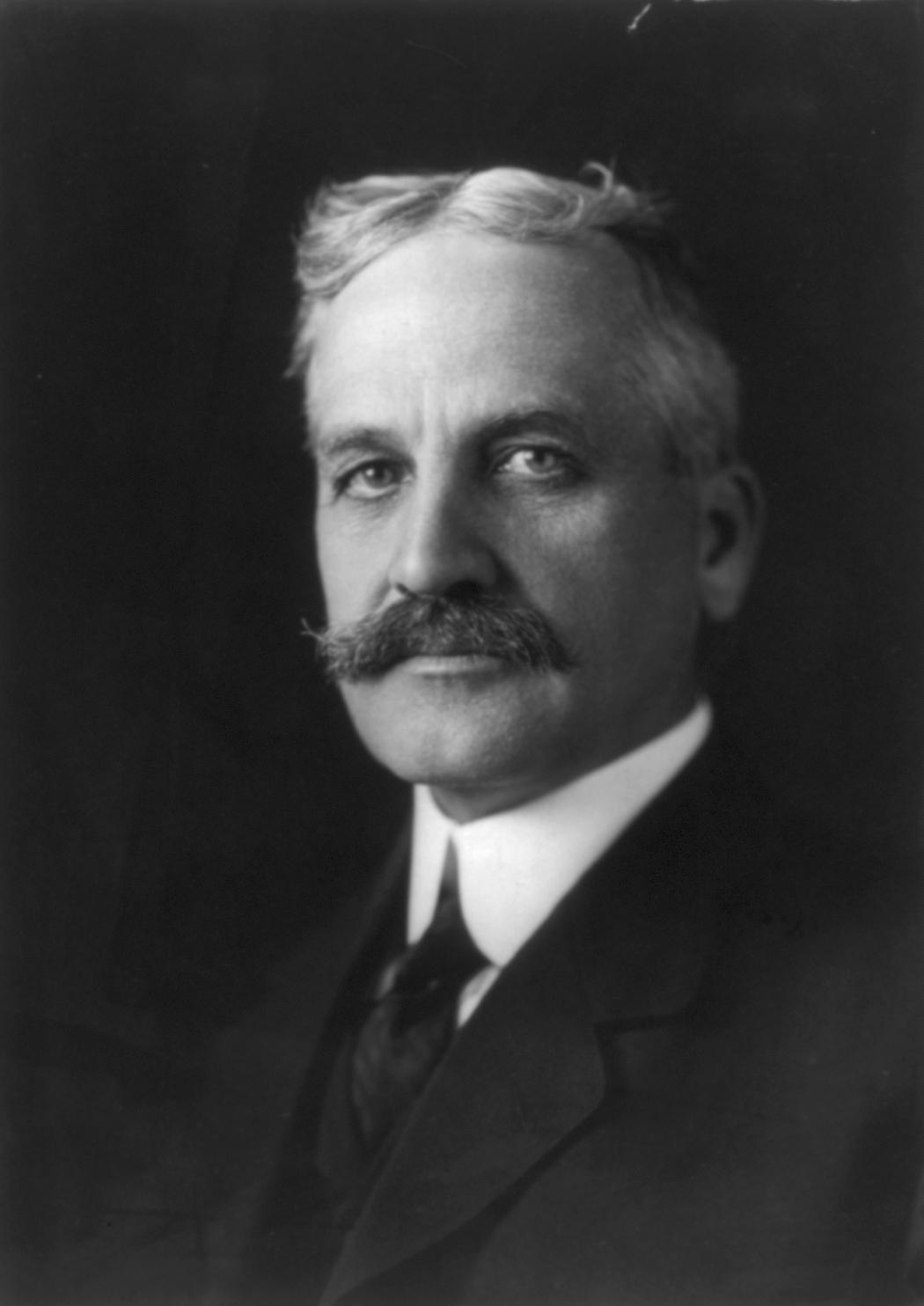
LeRoy Percy

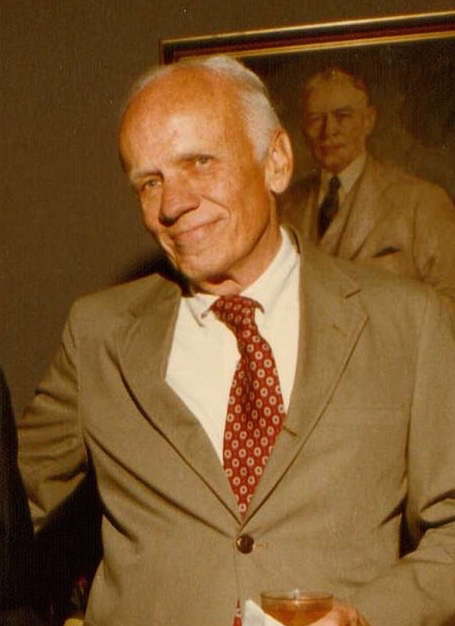
Walker Percy

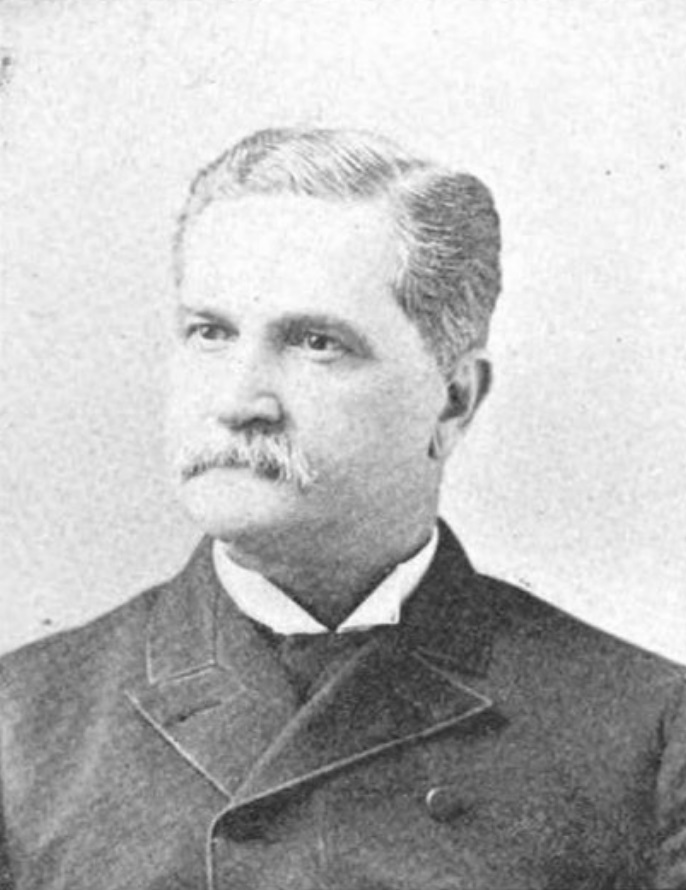
Louisiana Justice Felix P. Poche

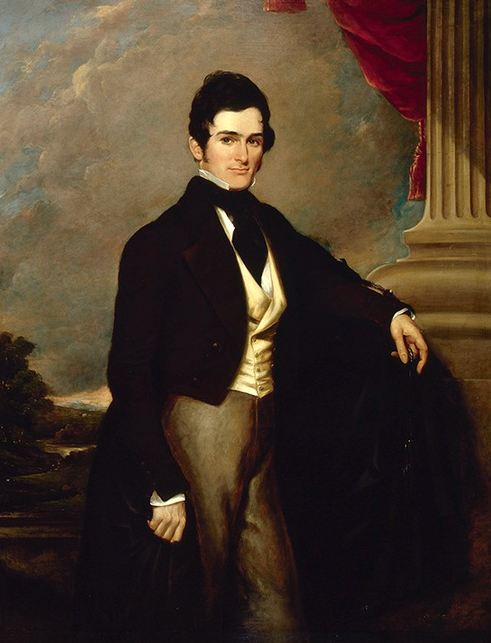
James Robb

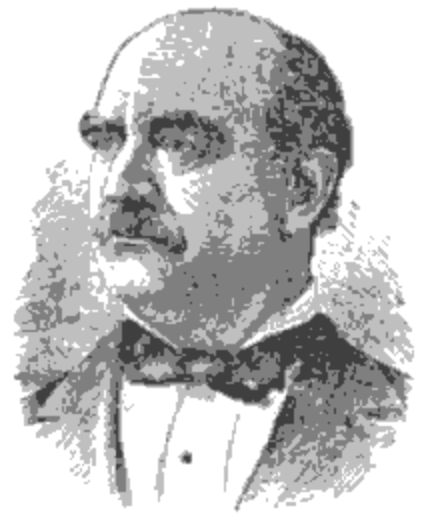
Thomas Jenkins Semmes

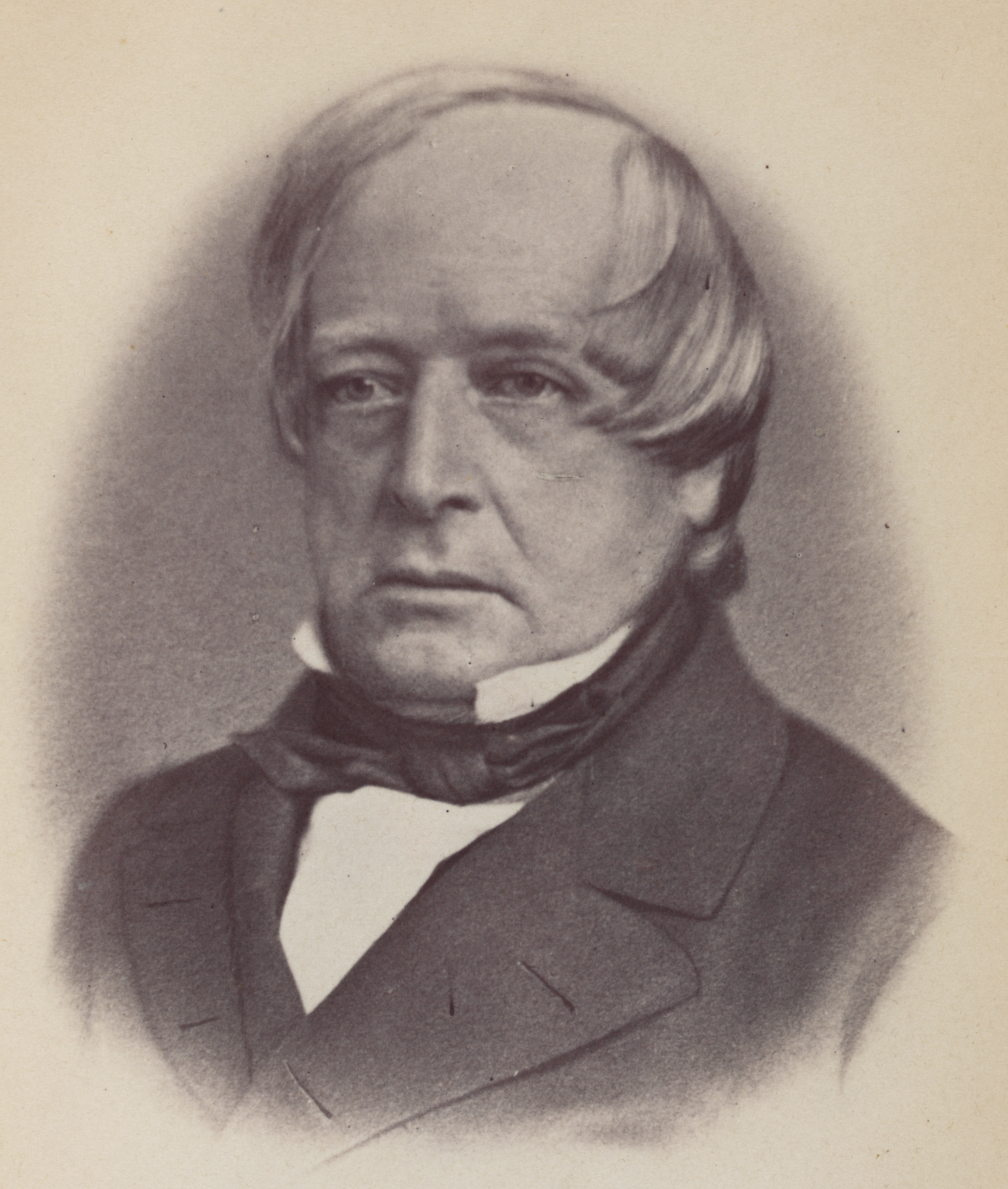
John Slidell

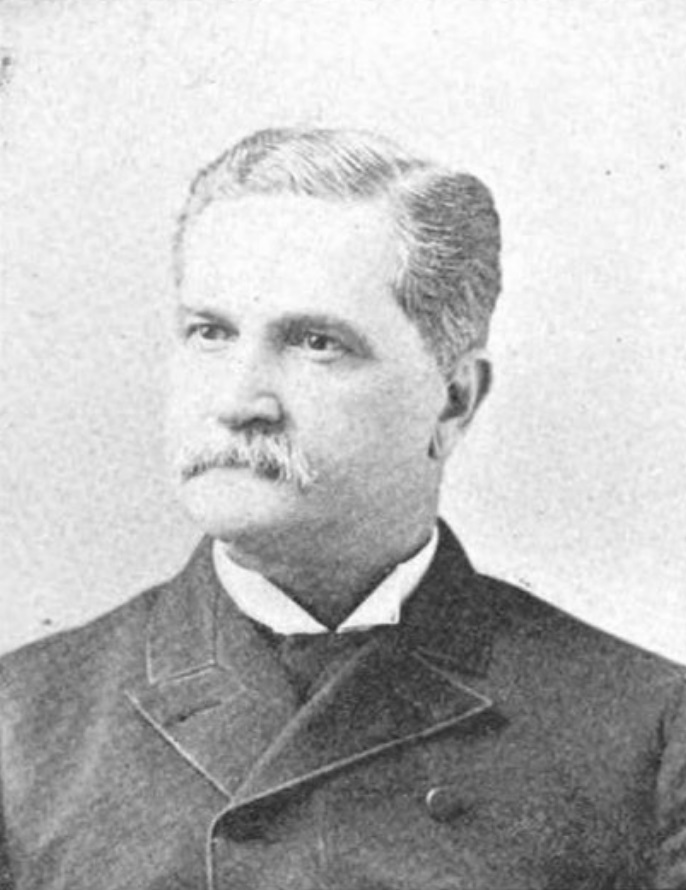
Louisiana Justice Felix P. Poche

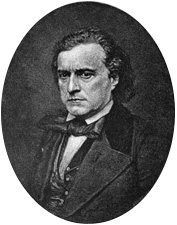
Pierre Soule

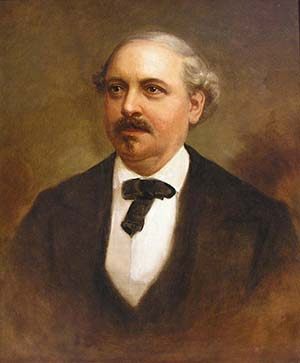
Louisiana Justice Henry M. Spofford

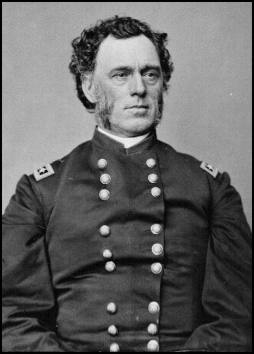
Maj. Gen. James B. Steedman

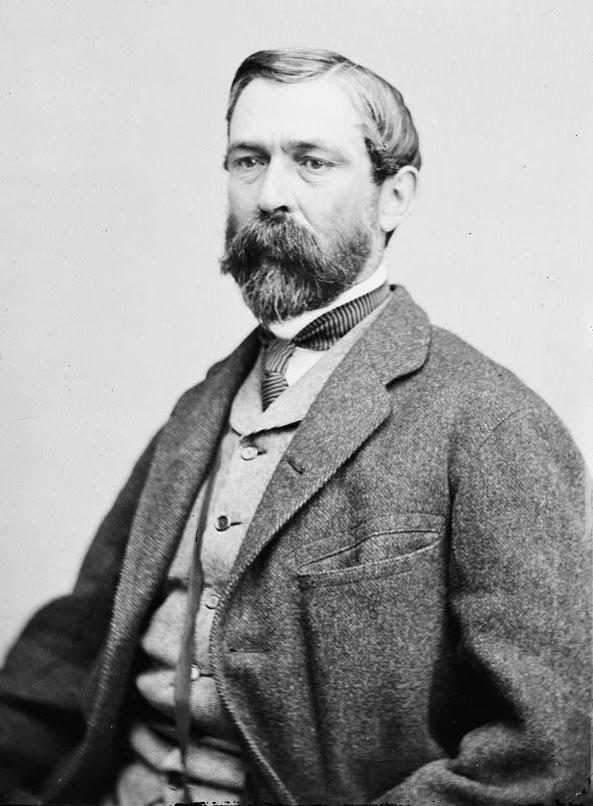
Gen. Dick Taylor

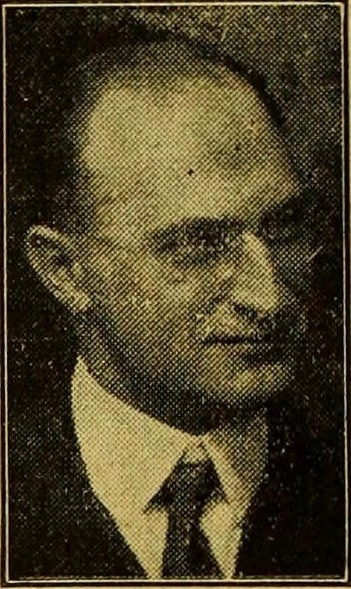
Thomas Semmes Walmsley

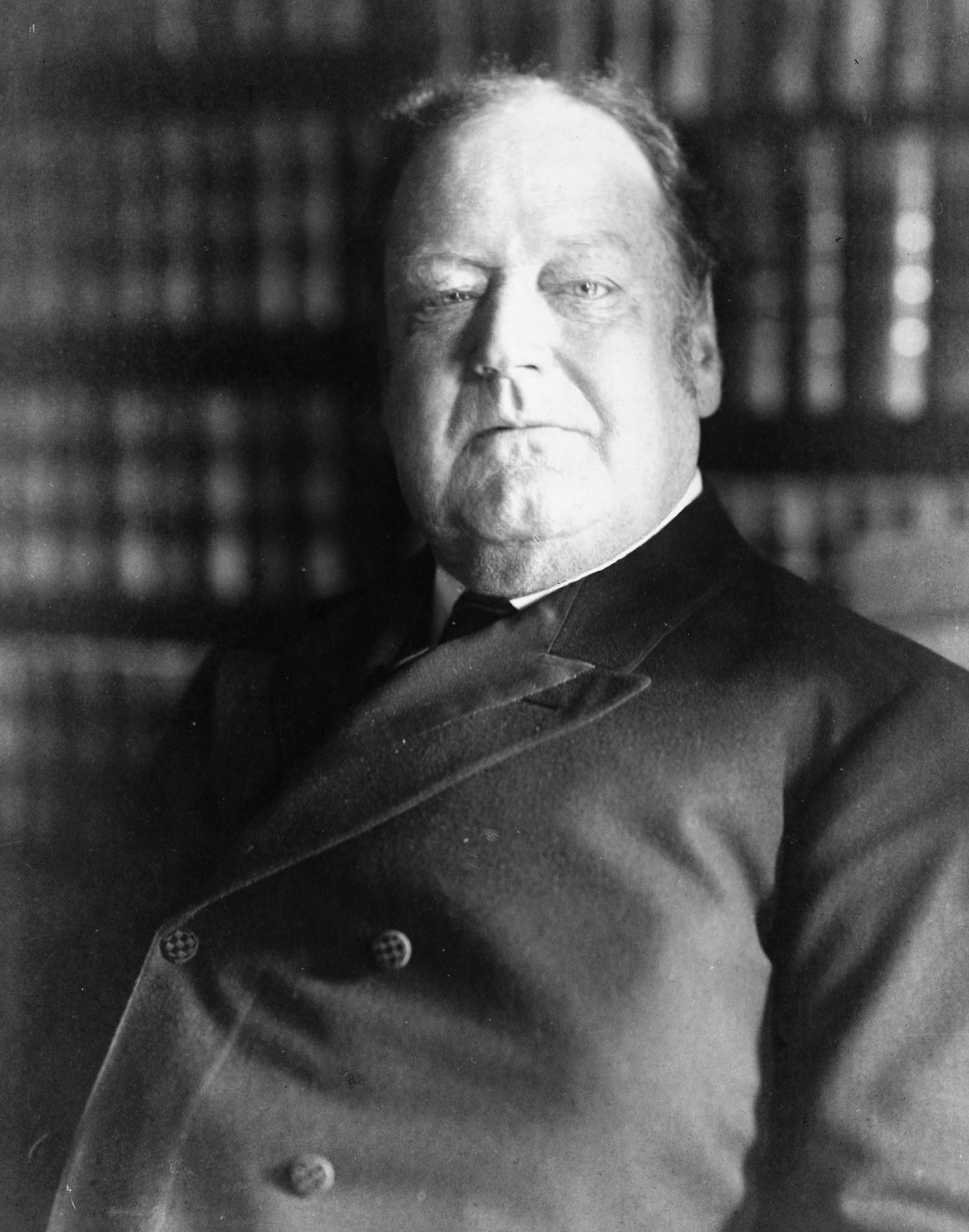
Supreme Court Chief Justice Edward Douglas White

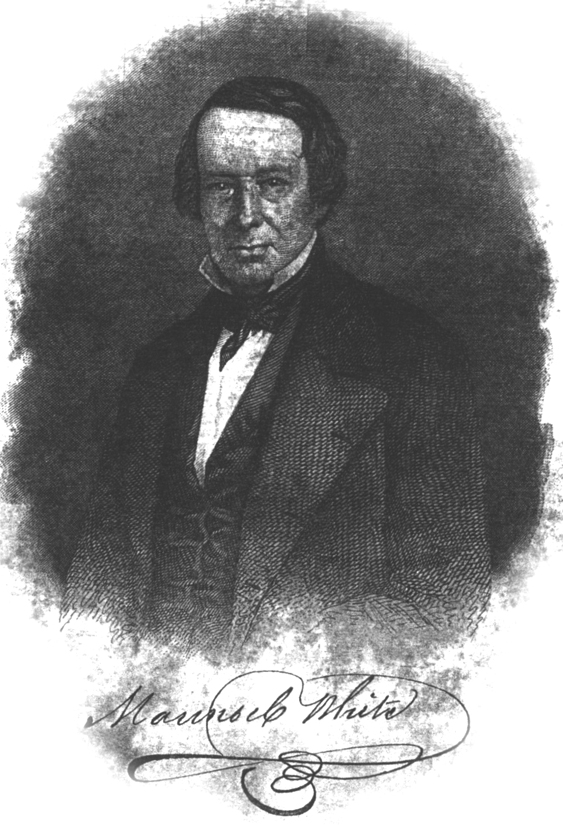
Maunsel White

== Horse racing ==
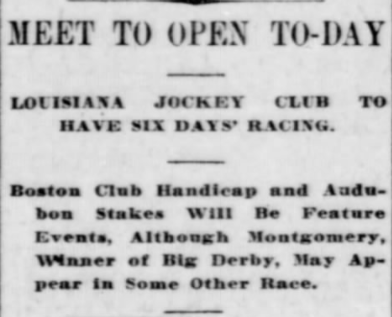
LA Jockey's BC Handicap, 1907

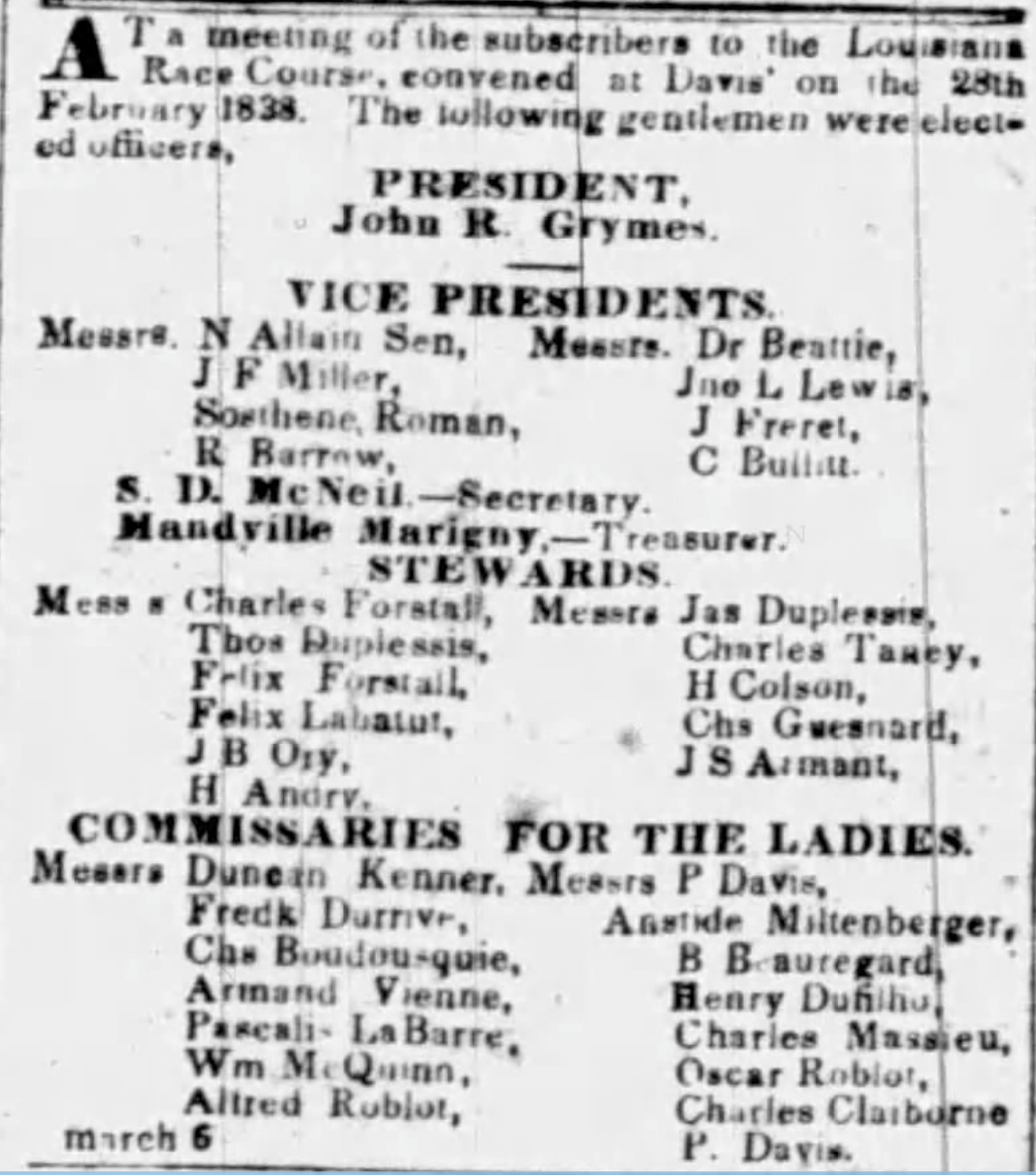
Louisiana Jockey Club Subscribers Meeting

Members of the Boston Club frequently subscribed and patronized jockey clubs of the area, the Eclipse Race Course, the Metairie Race Course and the Fair Grounds Race Course, putting up high stakes purses to help offset the Jockey Club's expenses. "The Boston Club...being composed of gentlemen who know 'what's what'...insured a numerous and distinguished attendance upon these occasions." Later noting "In the betting circles last evening... The wagering was spirited and lively, and a good deal of money will change hands as a result." Boston Club Founding Member and Louisiana Race Course Subscriber President John Randolph Grymes owned filly Susan Yandal who ran in the first races at the Fair Grounds, his cousin Henry Tayloe, younger son of leading turfman J. Tayloe III of The Octagon, was one of the owners/builders of race course and member of The Louisiana Jockey Club, along with native French Creole Bernard de Marigny.

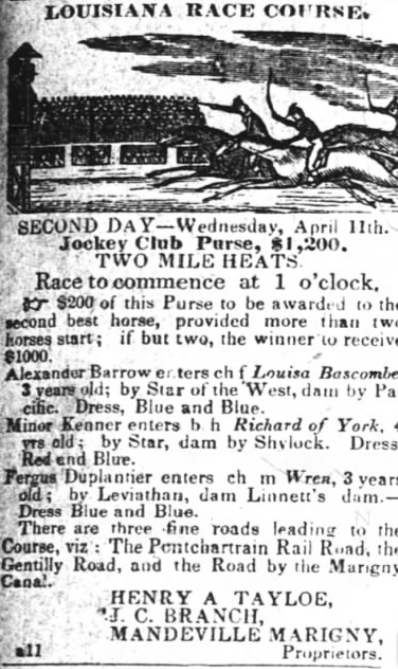
Louisiana Race Course 1838 Spring Meeting

== Homes of The Boston Club ==
- 1841–1855: Merchants Exchange, 126 Royal Street
- 1855–1862: 129/130 Canal Street
- 1862–1865: Club closed
- 1865–1867: 214 Royal Street (Hotel Monteleone)
- 1867–1884: old No. 4 Carondolet, now 122 (The Forstall Mansion)
- 1884: 824 Canal Street (then called 148 Canal Street)

== Description ==
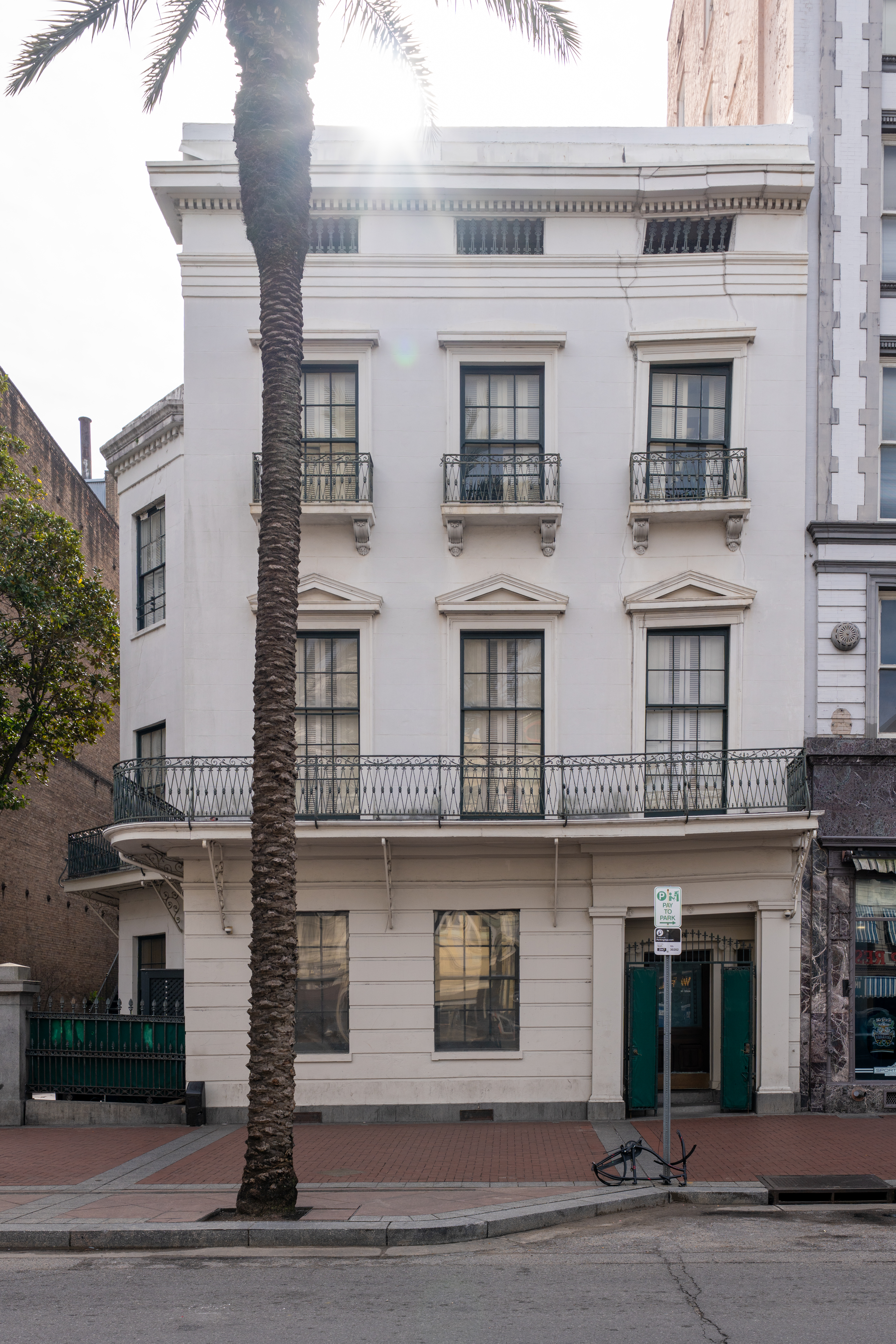
824 Canal Street

Entering from Canal Street, the entrance to the club is a 10x12 vestibule framed by sidelights between engaged ionic pilasters and columns, with a wooden door inscribed in a frosted glass the club's initials BC, opening into a marble-paved hallway. Adjacent, to the left through a solid mahogany door, is a well-decorated parlor, extending fifty-five feet deep from the front facade. Here can be found leather chairs, lace curtains, and rockers with foremost men of New Orleans discussing current events. There is a reception area with a large round table behind leading into formal and informal dining areas. The formal dining room is forty-five feet deep, with molded stucco ceiling cornices and large center ceiling medallion of floral designs, and mantels finished in the period Eastlake Style replacing earlier marble mantel carved with cherubs and flute players. The bar, located behind the informal dining area, is made of oak along with the wainscot running around the room. The second floor has two rooms, the front, a former card room while the rear is mainly used as a sitting room but can be converted easily into a dining room, it is finished in oak with cypress doors and is attached to a billiards room, board room and lady's water closet.

== Significance ==
The Boston Club is a social club composed solely of Anglo-Americans since the turn of the century, with few details known about its constituents. Members usually announce their associations upon death, in their obituaries. Its clubhouse has held lavish balls, regular daily lunches, monthly dinners, and annual spring and fall parties. Its events and social activities were the fodder for many newspaper and social columns at the turn of the 19th century and on into the 20th century. That a lavish club lifestyle could be centered around something as simple as a card game serves as a sign of prosperous times in New Orleans.

== Status as the "oldest club in the south" ==
The Boston Club is the oldest City Club in the Southern United States. Only two Gentlemen's City Clubs, that offer the facilities of a traditional gentlemen's city club – regular hours, paid staff, a bar, a dining room, lodging rooms – that are associated with the English model of city clubs in the St. James's district of London, are older: the Philadelphia Club, and the Union Club of the City of New York.

== In popular culture ==
In The Moviegoer, by Walker Percy, "Uncle Jules" is said to have suffered a heart attack (his second) and died at the Boston Club on Mardi Gras.

== Gallery ==
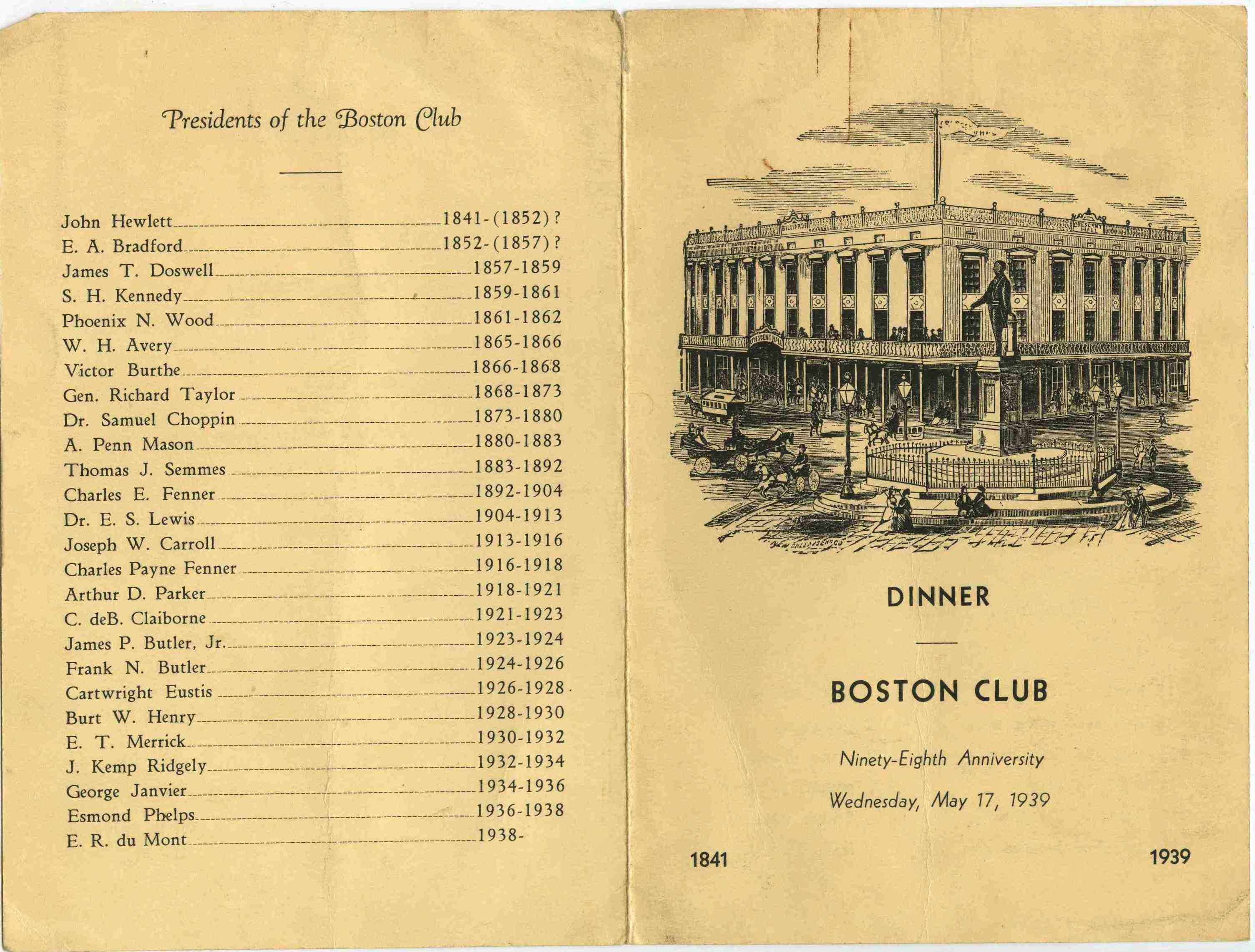
Boston Club Dinner Menu

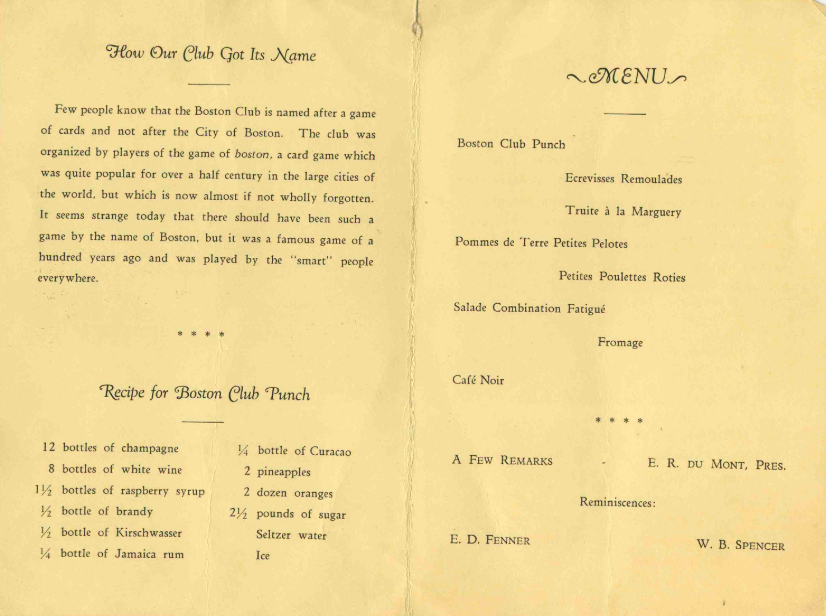
Boston Club Dinner Menu

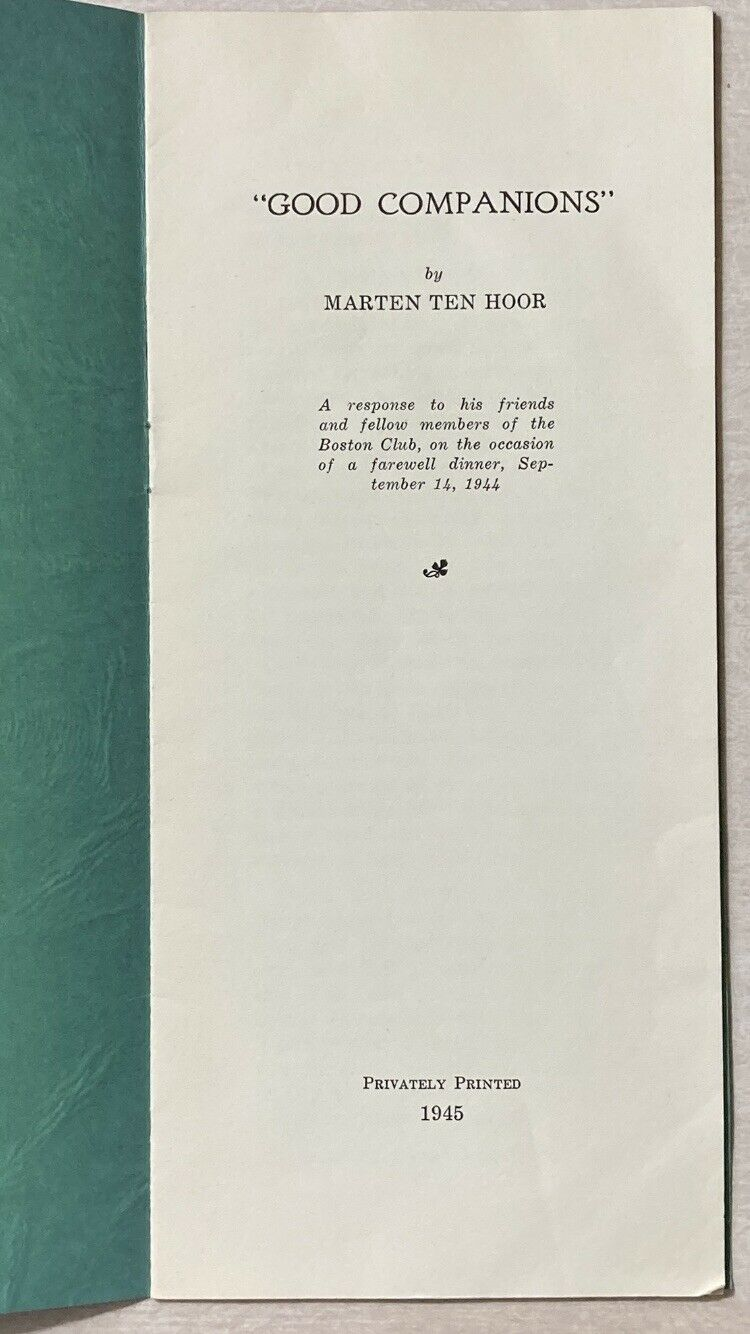
Good Companions, A farewell to the Boston Club of New Orleans

== See also ==
- The Pickwick Club
- Union Club
- Philadelphia Club
- List of gentlemen's clubs in the United States
- Mistick Krewe

== Works cited ==
- Coleman, W.H. (1885). Historical Sketch Book and Guide to New Orleans and Environs: With Map. Illustrated with Many Original Engravings; and Containing Exhaustive Accounts of the Traditions, Historical Legends, and Remarkable Localities of the Creole City. W. H. Coleman.
- Landry, S.O. (1938). History of the Boston Club: Organized in 1841. Pelican Publishing Company.
- O'Neill, Rosary; Vaz, Kim Marie (2014). New Orleans Carnival Krewes. Charleston, SC: The History Press. ISBN 978-1-62619-154-9.
- Gill, J. (1997). Lords of Misrule: Mardi Gras and the Politics of Race in New Orleans. University Press of Mississippi. ISBN 978-1-60473-638-0.
- Parrish, T.M. (1992). Richard Taylor, Soldier Prince of Dixie. Richard Taylor: soldier prince of Dixie. University of North Carolina Press. ISBN 978-0-8078-2032-2.
- Rightor, H. (1900). Standard History of New Orleans, Louisiana, Giving a Description of the Natural Advantages, Natural History ... Settlement, Indians, Creoles, Municipal and Military History, Mercantile and Commercial Interests, Banking, Transportation, Struggles Against High Water, the Press, Educational ... Etc (PDF). Lewis Publishing Company.
- Meade, R.D.; Davis, W.C. (2001). Judah P. Benjamin: Confederate Statesman. LSU Press. ISBN 978-0-8071-2744-5.
- Herringshaw, T.W.; American Publishers' Association (1919). Herringshaw's American Blue-book of Biography: Prominent Americans of ... American Publishers' Association.
- Reeves, W.D. (2018). Notable New Orleanians: a Tricentennial Tribute. Historical Publishing Network. ISBN 978-1-944891-48-0.
