= Forstall system =

The Forstall System was an American banking system developed by Edmund Jean Forstall in 1842 and used until the end of the Civil War. After the Panic of 1837, banks underwent two main reformations. New York adapted a free banking system while Louisiana set up a banking system with specie reserve requirements. The Forstall System propelled Louisiana to economic maturity with its sound and credible banking system. It has been called one of the building blocks of the modern financial system still in place today.

== Background ==
Prior to the Panic of 1837, the banking system across the nation was expanding and greatly contributed to economic growth and development. During and after the Panic, banks stopped issuing specie requirements. A five-year depression followed with record-high unemployment. A bill to recharter the Second Bank of the United States failed to pass, after which the United States also faced a period of high inflation and deep depression. Two major legislative efforts attempted to reform the American banking system. New York passed a free banking system in 1838 that undertook long-term credit interest while the Louisiana Bank Act of 1842 passed the Forstall System. Edmund Forstall was the president of Citizens Bank of New Orleans, a legislator, and an agent of Baring Brothers. In 1842 he influenced Louisiana to require all banks to hold short-term self-extinguishing assets similar to the real bills principle in Britain. The Forstall System was officially put into place on February 5, 1842.

== System policies ==
Following the Panic of 1837 and years and poor economic conditions, all New Orleans banks had been suspended. The new system proposed that the charters of old banks could be renewed but new banks could not be created. This is a sharp contrast to New York's system of Free Banking. The most important feature of the Forstall System was that newly rechartered banks were required to maintain specie reserve requirement equal to one third of their note and deposit liabilities. The other two thirds was to be in the form of ninety-day paper. The combination of specie and ninety-day paper ensured a safe ratio of quick to non-liquid assets. This was the first system under which reserves be counted against notes as well as deposit liabilities. Banks were also required to publish their balance sheets in a uniform comparative report published weekly. The intent of this aspect of the law was to allow banks to track their individual position and assess the overall state of the local money market.

== Legacy ==
The Forstall System enabled New Orleans’ banks to establish a reputation of dependability that allowed their notes to circulate widely. The system was widely regarded as successful, even gaining praise from the Governor of New York, who stated “…the chief banks of New Orleans, alone of all the banks in the country, were enabled to resist the pressure of universal suspension elsewhere and maintain their integrity”. Although a success, the Forstall System was not adopted in other parts of the country. This is due to New Orleans being a huge trade city, (fourth in the world at the time for amount and value of trade). New Orleans also faced a boom in railroad growth, which helped build specie in its banks. The large quantities of specie being built up were consistently desired for much-wanted large capital investments. This abundance of trade and specie build up allowed New Orleans’ banks to focus solely on monetary policy without having to worry about aiding capital formation.

== Debates regarding interpretation ==
In the first years of the Forstall System, attempts to renew the issued ninety-day paper often led to strong objection, and the creator was often shamed. In addition, banks could not continue to conduct business once reserve of specie fell below one-third. As a result, the businessmen of New Orleans felt a disadvantage in comparison to other ports such as New York or Charleston. This was because the loans in those cities could often be renewed for six months of even a year at six percent. Merchants’ banks followed commercial conventions while the majority did not. During 1861–1862 (following Louisiana's secession from the union), both political and military pressures caused conflicts with banks’ abilities to make specie payments. Payments in specie were able to start up again in April, during the time of the Capture of New Orleans. This short absence in the ability to make specie payments was not believed to have been caused by any wrongdoings of the banks. In November 1877, an anonymous writer from The Banker’s Magazine reported that the stipulations associated with the law establishing the Forstall System were strictly adhered to, including the reserves of specie and short-term paper. Much evidence demonstrates that the Forstall System operated successfully throughout its existence.

== See also ==
- Panic of 1837
- Second Bank of the United States
- Reserve requirement
