= Carlos Spaht =

American judge

Carlos Gustave Spaht, I

Judge of the 19th Judicial District Court of Louisiana

Personal details
- Born: August 2, 1906 Gentry County, Missouri, United States
- Died: April 29, 2001 (aged 94) Baton Rouge, Louisiana
- Resting place: Greenoaks Memorial Park in Baton Rouge
- Party: Democratic
- Children: Carlos Spaht, II; Paul Spaht
- Parent(s): Gustave Beauregard and Flora Elizabeth Holden Spaht
- Education: Louisiana State University
- Occupation: Attorney

Carlos Gustave Spaht, I (August 2, 1906 – April 29, 2001), was a Louisiana judge best remembered for having lost the Democratic gubernatorial runoff election in January 1952 to fellow Judge Robert F. Kennon of Minden, the seat of Webster Parish in northwestern Louisiana. Spaht's unsuccessful running mate for lieutenant governor was future Governor John J. McKeithen of Columbia, the seat of Caldwell Parish in north Louisiana. McKeithen lost to then State Senator C.E. "Cap" Barham of Ruston, the seat of Lincoln Parish, also in north Louisiana. At the time, McKeithen was an outgoing member of the Louisiana House of Representatives.

Spaht was affiliated for years with the Baton Rouge law firm Kantrow, Spaht, Weaver & Blitzer.

== Early years ==
Born to Gustave Beauregard Spaht and the former Flora Elizabeth Holden, Spaht was reared on a dairy farm in Gentry County in northwestern Missouri. The family moved to Louisiana in the middle 1920s. Spaht graduated from Louisiana State University in Baton Rouge, at which he joined the Reserve Officers' Training Corps. In 1931, he received his law degree from the Louisiana State University Law Center.

He served in the United States Army during World War II, having eventually earned the rank of colonel. He went on active duty in the summer of 1941 and was sent to China to work with the 8th Chinese Army. He became involved in the battle to free the Burma Road and was a commander under General Joseph Stilwell. He also met Lieutenant General Claire Lee Chennault of the Flying Tigers, who grew up near Ferriday, Louisiana. At the Battle of Mount Song, Spadt, Peter S. Hopkins, and John C. Young were instrumental in planning and designing the explosive charges that destroyed that enemy stronghold.

After his military service, Spaht was elected district attorney of East Baton Rouge Parish. He was later appointed a judge for the 19th Judicial District but resigned in order to run for governor in the 1951–1952 election cycle.

== Civic accomplishments ==
Spaht was a proponent of the desegregation of the Louisiana State University Law School and later worked to end segregation elsewhere. He promoted the creation of predominantly African American Southern University campuses in Shreveport and New Orleans.

When McKeithen became governor, he named Spaht to the prestigious LSU Board of Supervisors. Spaht worked with McKeithen in 1964 in drafting a code of ethics for elected officials and state employees.

== Memberships ==
- State Commission on Alcoholism
- Baton Rouge Bi-Racial Committee
- Committee on Emergency Allocations
- State Ethics Board
- Presbyterian Church
- Boy Scouts of America
- Veterans of Foreign Wars
- American Legion
- Young Men's Christian Association
- American Red Cross
- Young Men's Business Club

== Death and burial ==
Spaht died in Baton Rouge and is interred at Greenoaks Memorial Park in East Baton Rouge Parish. Spaht's son, Carlos G. Spaht, II (born June 22, 1942), who is registered with no party, is a mathematics professor at Louisiana State University in Shreveport. Another son, Paul H. Spaht (born July 1946), a Republican, practices law at his father's former Baton Rouge firm.

On April 2, 2008, Spaht, former state senator J. D. DeBlieux, and former Register of the State Lands Ellen Bryan Moore, were honored posthumously by the annual Louisiana Governor's Prayer Breakfast.
