= National Register of Historic Places listings in Caldwell Parish, Louisiana =

Location of Caldwell Parish in Louisiana

This is a list of the National Register of Historic Places listings in Caldwell Parish, Louisiana.

This is intended to be a complete list of the properties on the National Register of Historic Places in Caldwell Parish, Louisiana, United States. The locations of National Register properties for which the latitude and longitude coordinates are included below, may be seen in a map.

There are 10 properties listed on the National Register in the parish.

This National Park Service list is complete through NPS recent listings posted December 12, 2025.

== Current listings ==
	Name on the Register	Image	Date listed	Location	City or town	Description
1	Blanks House	Blanks House	January 17, 1995 (#94001567)	201 Wall Street; 32°06′14″N 92°04′26″W	Columbia	
2	Breston Plantation House	Breston Plantation House	November 22, 1980 (#80001709)	About 5 miles (8.0 km) northwest of Columbia on east bank of Riverton Lake; 32°10′13″N 92°05′53″W	Columbia vicinity	
3	Downtown Columbia Historic District	Downtown Columbia Historic District	October 18, 1996 (#96001164)	Junction of Main Street and Pearl Street; 32°06′21″N 92°04′29″W	Columbia	The 3-acre (1.2 ha) area comprises a total of 16 contributing properties, built between 1909 and 1930s.
4	First United Methodist Church	First United Methodist Church	August 12, 1982 (#82002764)	501 Church Street; 32°06′17″N 92°04′39″W	Columbia	
5	Graves Homeplace	Graves Homeplace	August 15, 2022 (#100008005)	281 Davis Lake Rd. 32°08′07″N 92°04′02″W	Columbia vicinity	
6	Landerneau Mound		January 14, 1999 (#98001579)	Address restricted	Hebert	
7	Martin House	Martin House	August 12, 1993 (#93000832)	203 Martin Place Road; 32°07′29″N 92°04′05″W	Columbia vicinity	Now hosting the Martin Home Place Museum.
8	The Oasis	The Oasis	July 31, 1989 (#89000976)	1710 Main Street (LA 845); 32°01′36″N 92°08′22″W	Clarks	Now hosting the Clarks Post Office.
9	Schepis Building	Schepis Building	January 16, 1986 (#86000069)	Main Street; 32°06′23″N 92°04′28″W	Columbia	Also part of Downtown Columbia Historic District since its creation on October 18, 1996.
10	Synope Plantation House	Synope Plantation House	October 5, 1982 (#82000432)	On Synope Road, along Ouachita River levee, about 600 yards (550 m) south of U.S. Route 165; 32°11′37″N 92°06′49″W	Columbia vicinity	

== See also ==
- List of National Historic Landmarks in Louisiana
- National Register of Historic Places listings in Louisiana
