= Winnice P. Clement =

American political official

Winnice P. Clement (August 4, 1899 – August 1985) was an American clerk. She was the Webster Parish Registrar of Voters in Minden, Louisiana for nearly 26 years, beginning in 1940. During her tenure, she was targeted for removal by white supremacist organizations committed to keeping African Americans from voting. Despite their efforts, she persisted in office until 1966, after the enforcement of the Voting Rights Act of 1965 in Louisiana.

In 1956, a pro-segregation White Citizens' Council took actions to remove African American voters from the registration rolls, after African American voter registration increased from zero when she took office to nearly 2,000. It had been customary to register white applicants without a test of their understanding of the Constitution if they seemed literate, and Clement had applied the same standard to African American applicants. After demands by the council (and their protests to Louisiana governor Robert Kennon), and a visit from the state supervisor of registration, Clement began strictly enforcing the law on February 23, 1956, which by March 8, 1956, resulted in the disqualification of 24 white applicants.

Clement was then fired from her position by Governor Kennon, after the Council continued to protest, but in May 1956, she was reinstated by Governor Earl Long, who also worked with leaders in the Louisiana Senate to draft legislation to remove the literacy test provision, which had been adopted in 1898 to disenfranchise African American voters, with an "understanding" provision intended to allow registrars to only use the test on African American applicants. The proposed legislation also required a court order to remove voters from the registration rolls. Purges of the voter rolls continued, and by 1962, about 100 African American voters were registered in Webster Parish.

Clement was called before the United States Commission on Civil Rights and a federal grand jury to answer questions, subject to FBI inspections of her office, and involved in years of litigation that included a 1963 injunction against the use of the test, and later resulted in a March 14, 1966 order from the United States Court of Appeals for the Fifth Circuit to enforce the Voting Rights Act of 1965. She retired on May 1, 1966, and as of July 1966, nearly 1,800 African Americans were registered to vote in Webster Parish.

Clement was born on August 4, 1899. She died in August 1985.

== See also ==
- Redeemers
- Disfranchisement after the Reconstruction era
