= Blanks House =

Historic house in Louisiana, United States

- U.S. National Register of Historic Places
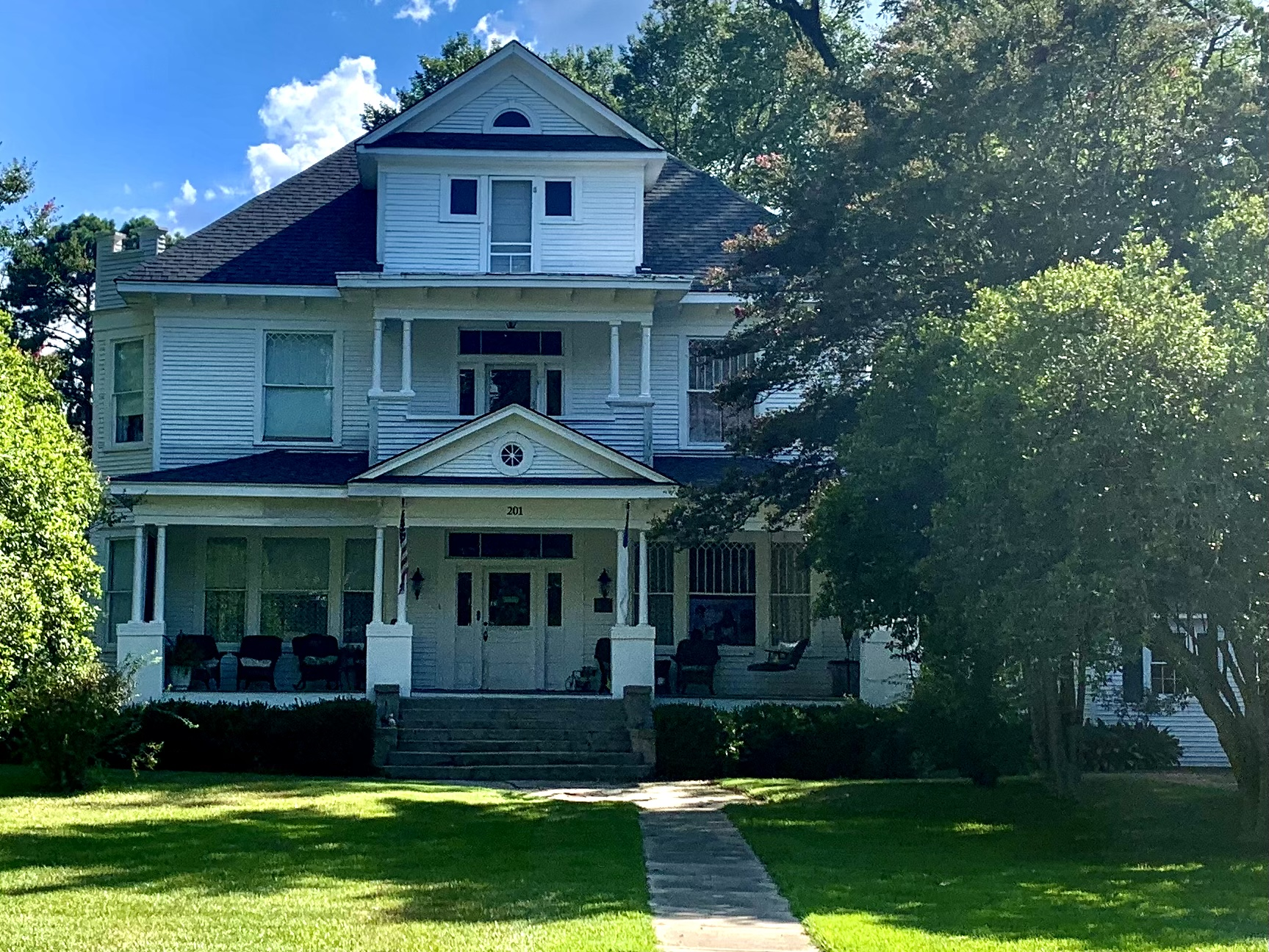
- Blanks House in August 2023

- Location within Louisiana Location within the United States
- Location: 201 Wall Street, Columbia, Louisiana
- Coordinates: 32°06′14″N 92°04′26″W
- Area: less than one acre
- Built: c.1900
- Architectural style: Mixed (more Than 2 Styles from different periods)
- NRHP reference No.: 94001567
- Added to NRHP: January 17, 1995

The Blanks House, located at 201 Wall Street in Columbia, Louisiana, was built about 1900. It has also been known as Adams House. It was listed on the National Register of Historic Places in 1995.

The house has elements of Colonial Revival, Queen Anne, and other styles.

It was deemed notable as it is one of the largest historic structures, and is the largest residence, in Columbia, and in contrast to the conventional historic building stock described above, the house features an exotic blend of Gothic, Colonial Revival, Queen Anne, and Eastlake features. Thus, it is the most highly styled residence in the town."

== See also ==
- National Register of Historic Places listings in Caldwell Parish, Louisiana
