= Breston Plantation House =

Historic house in Louisiana, United States

- U.S. National Register of Historic Places
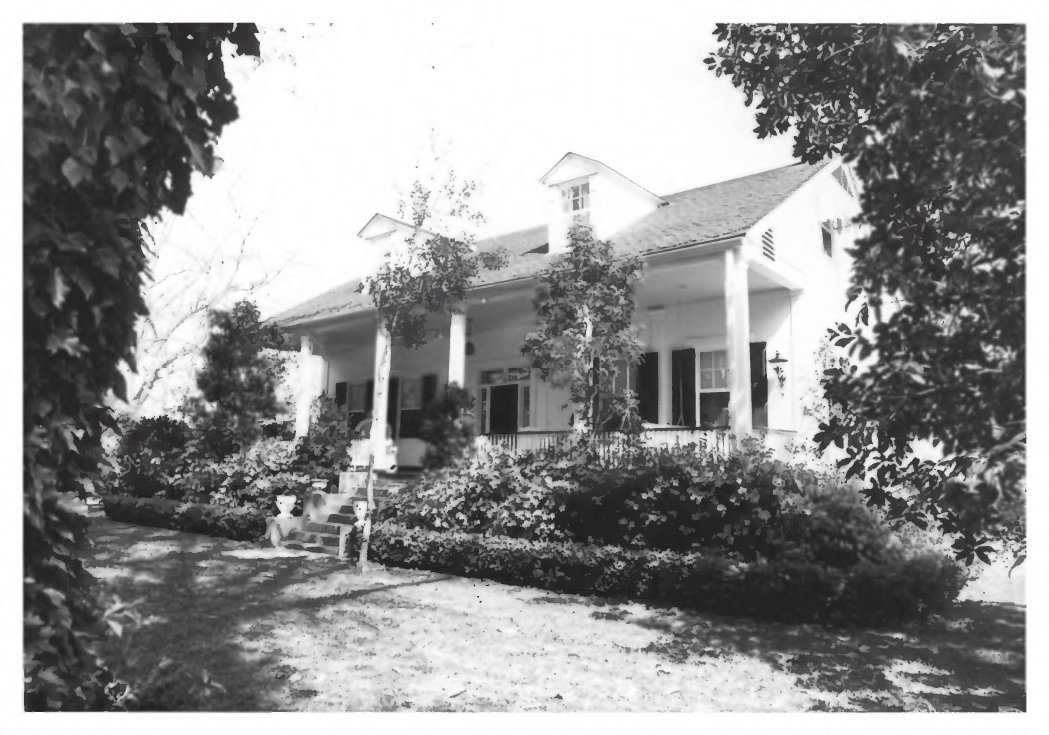

- Location within Louisiana Location within the United States
- Location: About 5 miles (8.0 km) northwest of Columbia on east bank of Riverton Lake
- Coordinates: 32°10′13″N 92°05′53″W
- Area: 0.18 acres (0.073 ha)
- Built: c.1835
- Architectural style: Greek Revival
- NRHP reference No.: 80001709
- Added to NRHP: November 22, 1980

Breston Plantation House in Caldwell Parish, Louisiana, was built in the 1830s. It was added to the National Register of Historic Places in 1980.

It is located behind the levee on the east bank of Riverton Lake, formerly the bed of Ouachita River, approximately 5 miles (8.0 km) above Columbia, Louisiana, near the community of Riverton.

The house shows a mixture of French Creole architecture and Greek Revival architecture. Exterior Greek Revival elements are its five-bay front facade, with center emphasis; six molded Doric posts and entablature of the front gallery; six matching pilasters along the front wall of the house.

== See also ==
- List of plantations in Louisiana
- National Register of Historic Places listings in Caldwell Parish, Louisiana
