= First United Methodist Church (Columbia, Louisiana) =

- First Methodist Church
- U.S. National Register of Historic Places
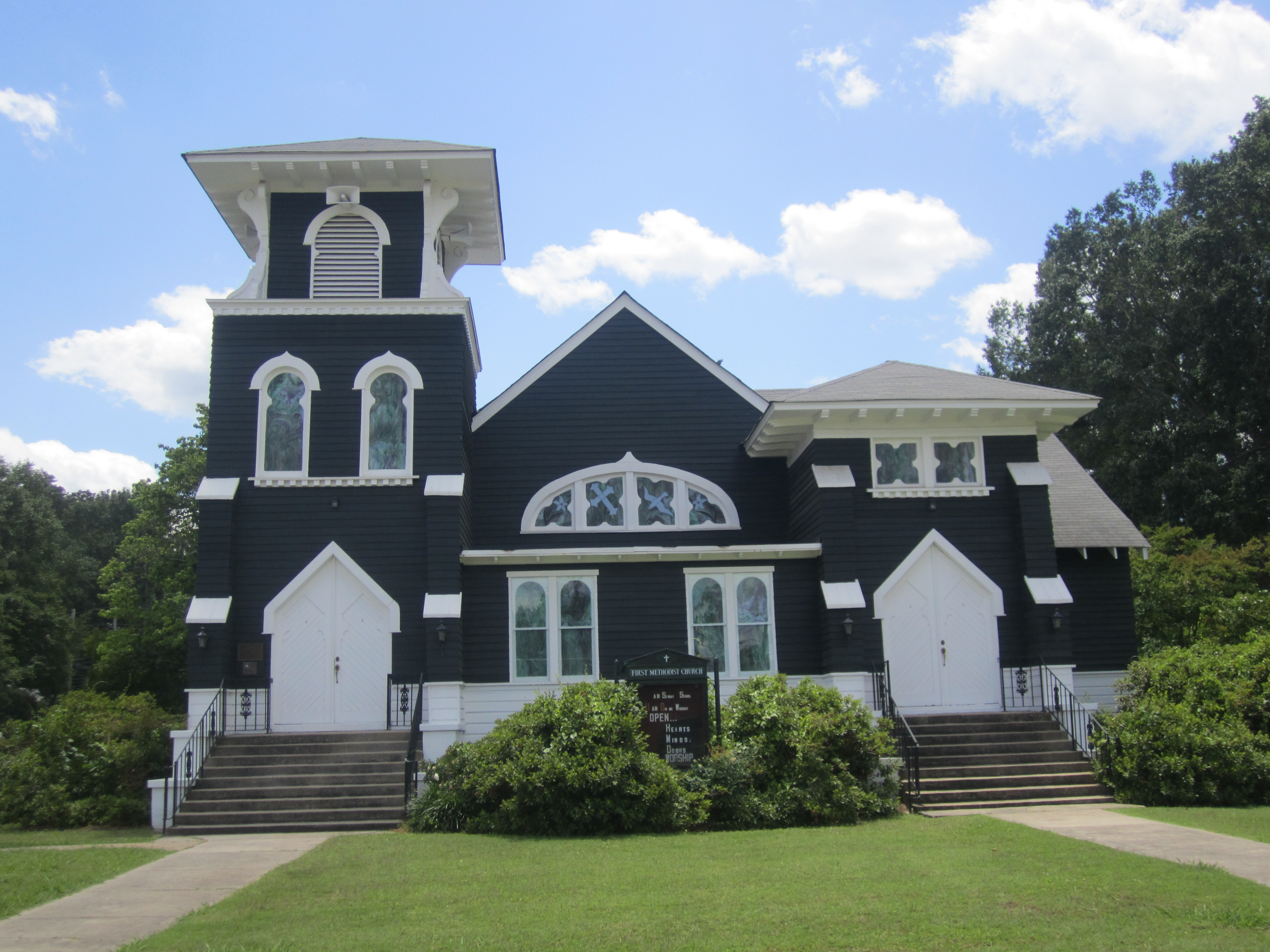

- Location within Louisiana Location within the United States
- Location: 501 Church Street, Columbia, Louisiana
- Coordinates: 32°06′17″N 92°04′39″W
- Area: less than one acre
- Built: 1911
- Built by: Frank Masselin & Son
- Architectural style: Bungalow/craftsman, Gothic, Romanesque
- NRHP reference No.: 82002764
- Added to NRHP: August 12, 1982

First Methodist Church of Columbia is a historic Methodist church located at 501 Church Street in Columbia, Louisiana. It was built in 1911 and enlarged in 1939.

The church features Bungalow/Craftsman, Gothic, and Romanesque architectural elements, and the building was added to the National Register of Historic Places in 1982.

== See also ==
- National Register of Historic Places listings in Caldwell Parish, Louisiana
