= Schepis Building =

- U.S. National Register of Historic Places
- U.S. Historic district – Contributing property
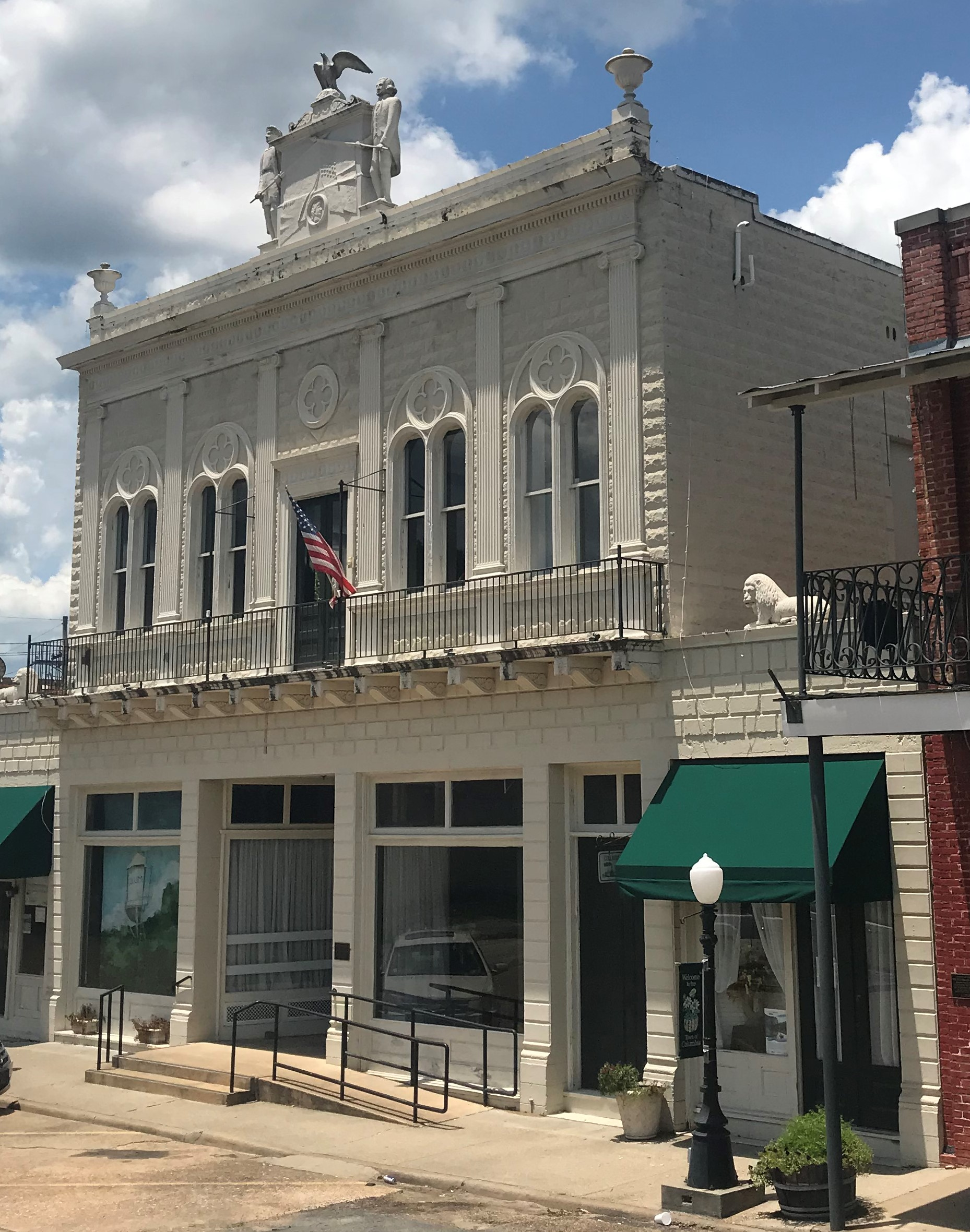

- Location within Louisiana Location within the United States
- Location: Main Street; Columbia, Louisiana
- Coordinates: 32°06′23″N 92°04′28″W
- Area: 0.2 acres (0.081 ha)
- Built: c.1916
- Built by: Nicholas John Schepis
- Architectural style: Late 19th And 20th Century Revivals, Italian Renaissance
- Part of: Downtown Columbia Historic District (ID96001164)
- NRHP reference No.: 86000069

Significant dates
- Added to NRHP: January 16, 1986
- Designated CP: October 18, 1996

The Schepis Building, on Main Street in Columbia, Louisiana, was built in about 1916. It was listed on the National Register of Historic Places in 1986. The building was also added as a contributing property to the Downtown Columbia Historic District at the time of its creation on October 18, 1996.

It is a two-story cast concrete commercial building in the Italian Renaissance style. According to its NRHP nomination, the builder, Nicholas John Schepis, was reportedly "a patriotic Italian immigrant who wanted to exemplify both his Italian roots as well as his new-found Americanism. Judging by the design, this could well be true. The facade is very specifically Italian, resembling Renaissance style palazzos of the mid-fifteenth century."

The building is now hosting the Schepis Museum.

== See also ==
- National Register of Historic Places listings in Caldwell Parish, Louisiana
