= Lucille May Grace =

American politician

Louisiana Register of State Lands
- In office 1931–1952
- Preceded by: Fred J. Grace
- Succeeded by: Ellen Bryan Moore
- In office 1956–1957
- Preceded by: Ellen Bryan Moore

Personal details
- Born: October 3, 1900 Plaquemine, Louisiana
- Died: December 22, 1957 (aged 57) Baton Rouge, Louisiana
- Spouse: Fred C. Dent
- Children: 2
- Education: Academy of the Sacred Heart, Grand Coteau; Louisiana State University

Lucille May Grace (October 3, 1900 – December 22, 1957) was an American politician who was the Louisiana Register of State Lands from 1931 to 1952 and again from 1956 to 1957. She was the state's first female statewide elected officeholder and first female gubernatorial candidate.

== Biography ==
Born in Plaquemine, she graduated from Academy of the Sacred Heart, Grand Coteau, and received a Bachelor of Arts degree from the Louisiana State University, where she was the first female freshman treasurer.

After the death of her father, Fred J. Grace, on September 9, 1931, she was appointed to succeed him as Louisiana Register of State Lands by Governor Huey Long, before being elected in every leap-year election from 1932 to 1956 (except 1952). (Note: During the time she held the office, Sections 1 and 18 of Article V of the Louisiana Constitution defined the Register of State Lands position as a political office elected every four years alongside several members of the state's eight-member executive department, but this ability of this office was removed by the 1974 constitution after her death.) She also ran in the 1952 Louisiana gubernatorial election, making her the state's first female gubernatorial candidate.

After her unsuccessful gubernatorial bid in 1952, she took over her old position from Ellen Bryan Moore in 1956 before her death in Baton Rouge the next year. Her husband ran for the office in 1959 but Moore retained the seat.

She had one son with her husband Fred C. Dent. Despite being married, she kept her maiden name in order to maintain her recognition.

She was posthumously inducted to the Louisiana Center for Women in Government and Business Hall of Fame in 1995 and the Louisiana Political Museum and Hall of Fame in 2011.

== Bibliography ==
- Garry Boulard, The Big Lie: Hale Boggs, Lucille May Grace and Leander Perez in 1951, Gretna, Louisiana: Pelican Publishing, 2001

== See also ==
- List of the first women holders of political offices in North and Central America and the Caribbean

== Notes ==
Preceded by Fred J. Grace	Louisiana Register of State Lands; 1931–1952	Succeeded by Ellen Bryan Moore

Preceded by Ellen Bryan Moore (D)	Louisiana Register of State Lands; 1956–1957	Succeeded by Appointee of Governor Earl Kemp Long
