= Lelon Kenney =

American farmer, businessman, and politician (1935–2018)

Lelon Luther Kenney (May 25, 1935–June 18, 2018) was an American farmer, businessman, and politician.

== Biography ==
Kenney lived in Columbia, Louisiana with his wife and family. He was a farmer and businessman. kenney was involved in the banking business. He served on the Caldwell Parish, Louisiana School Board from 1967 to 1972 and on the Caldwell Parish Police Jury from 1972 to 1976. Kenney was a Democrat. He served in the Louisiana House of Representatives from 1995 to 2007.
