= 1952 Louisiana gubernatorial election =

1952 Louisiana Democratic gubernatorial primary
- February 19, 1952
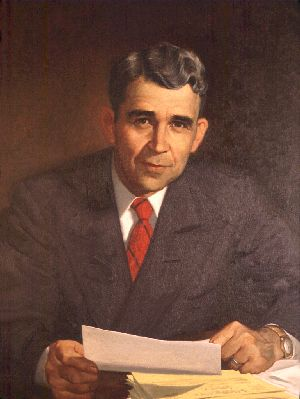

Candidate	Robert F. Kennon	Carlos Spaht
Party	Democratic	Democratic
Alliance	Independent	Longite
Popular vote	482,302	302,743
Percentage	61.44%	38.56%
- Parish results Kennon: 50–60% 60–70% 70–80% >90% Spaht: 50–60% 60–70%
Governor before election
Earl K. Long
Democratic
Elected Governor
Robert F. Kennon
Democratic

The 1952 Louisiana gubernatorial election was held in two rounds on January 15 and February 19, 1952. Like most Southern states between the Reconstruction Era and the Civil Rights Movement, Louisiana's Republican Party was virtually nonexistent in terms of electoral support.

This meant that the two Democratic Party primary elections held on these dates were the real contest over who would be governor of Louisiana. The 1952 election saw the defeat of Long candidate Carlos Spaht, and the election of Robert F. Kennon as governor.

In the low-turnout general election held on April 22, 1952, Kennon defeated Harrison Bagwell, a Baton Rouge lawyer and only the second Louisiana Republican gubernatorial nominee since Reconstruction. Kennon received 118,723 votes (96 percent) to Bagwell's 4,958 votes (4 percent).

== Democratic primary ==
=== Candidates ===
- Hale Boggs, U.S. Representative from New Orleans
- Bill Dodd, Lieutenant Governor and former State Representative from Allen Parish
- Lucille May Grace, Register of State Lands
- Robert F. Kennon, judge of the Second Circuit Court of Appeal and candidate for governor in 1948
- Dudley J. LeBlanc, State Senator from Acadia Parish
- Cliff Liles, Lake Charles resident
- James M. McLemore, Alexandria cattle rancher
- Kermit Parker, New Orleans pharmacist and reform school administrator
- Carlos Spaht, judge of the Nineteenth District Court and former East Baton Rouge Parish district attorney

=== Results ===
The primary election was held on January 15.

1952 Democratic gubernatorial primary
Party	Candidate	Votes	%
Democratic	Carlos Spaht	173,987	22.84%
Democratic	Robert F. Kennon	163,434	21.46%
Democratic	Hale Boggs	142,542	18.71%
Democratic	James M. McLemore	116,405	15.28%
Democratic	Bill Dodd	90,925	11.94%
Democratic	Dudley J. LeBlanc	62,906	8.26%
Democratic	Kermit Parker	5,470	0.72%
Democratic	Lucille May Grace	4,832	0.63%
Democratic	Cliff Liles	1,233	0.16%
Total votes		761,734	100.00%

=== Runoff ===
Because no candidate received a majority of the vote, a runoff between the top two finishers was held on February 19.

1952 Democratic gubernatorial runoff
Party	Candidate	Votes	%	±%
Democratic	Robert F. Kennon	482,302	61.44%	▲39.98
Democratic	Carlos Spaht	302,743	38.56%	▲17.72
Total votes		785,045	100.00%	

== General election ==
=== Candidates ===
- Harrison Bagwell, Baton Rouge lawyer (Republican)
- Robert F. Kennon, judge of the Louisiana Second Circuit Court of Appeal (Democratic)

=== Results ===
1952 Louisiana gubernatorial election
Party	Candidate	Votes	%	±%
Democratic	Robert F. Kennon	118,723	95.99%	
Republican	Harrison Bagwell	4,958	4.01%	
Total votes		123,681	100.00%	

== Sources ==
Louisiana Secretary of State. Democratic Primary Election Returns, 1952.
