= Downtown Columbia Historic District (Columbia, Louisiana) =

Historic district in Louisiana, United States

- U.S. National Register of Historic Places
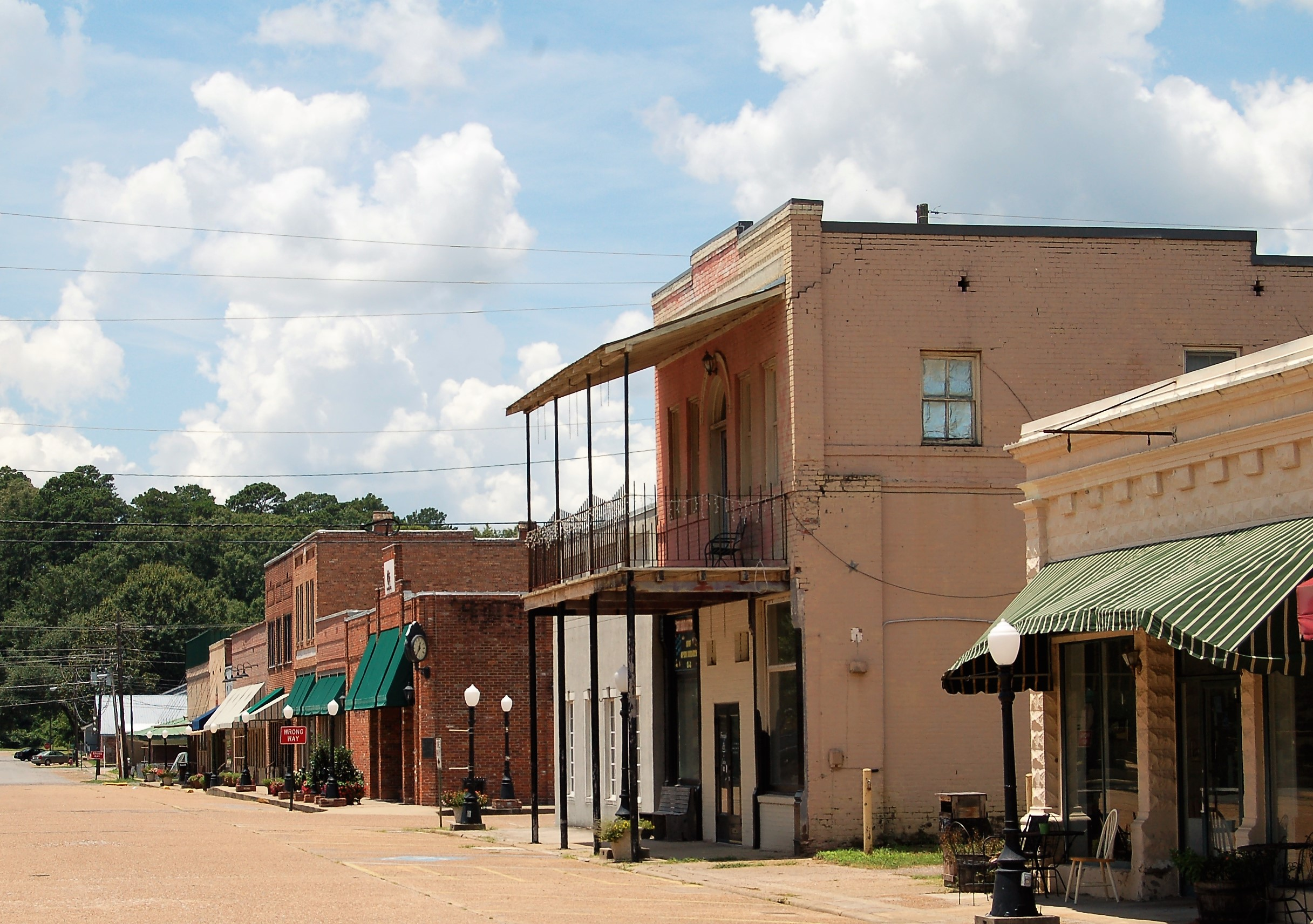

- Location within Louisiana
- Location: Jct. of Main and Pearl Sts., Columbia, Louisiana
- Coordinates: 32.10596°N 92.07469°W
- Area: 3 acres (1.2 ha)
- Architectural style: Italian Renaissance
- NRHP reference No.: 96001164
- Added to NRHP: October 18, 1996

The Downtown Columbia Historic District, in Columbia, Louisiana in Caldwell Parish, Louisiana, was listed on the National Register of Historic Places in 1996.

It includes 15 contributing buildings on 3 acres (1.2 ha) around the junction of Main Street and Pearl Street in Columbia. It includes the Schepis Building, which was already separately listed on the National Register.

The district is built based on the architecture of the Italian Renaissance. Its historical function was for commerce and trade, social function, and government. There was a department store, a meeting hall, a financial institution, a courthouse, and other businesses.

The 3 acres (1.2 ha) area comprises a total of 16 contributing properties, built between 1909 and 1930s.
