= Ellen Bryan Moore =

American politician

Louisiana Register of State Lands
- In office 1952–1956
- Preceded by: Lucille May Grace
- Succeeded by: Lucille May Grace
- In office 1960–1976
- Preceded by: Missing
- Succeeded by: Elected office abolished

Personal details
- Born: April 13, 1912 Baton Rouge, East Baton Rouge Parish, Louisiana, US
- Died: February 20, 1999 (aged 86) Baton Rouge, Louisiana
- Resting place: Magnolia Cemetery in Baton Rouge
- Party: Democratic

Ellen Bryan Moore (April 13, 1912 – February 20, 1999) was an American politician who served as Louisiana Register of State Lands from 1952 to 1956 and 1960 to 1976.

== Biography ==
Moore was born in Baton Rouge, Louisiana (where her grandfather served as mayor) on April 13, 1912. Her father, Alexander Bryan, had served as the warden of the Louisiana State Penitentiary. She received her bachelor's degree from the Louisiana State University. During World War II, Moore was a member of the Women's Army Corps and was a unit commander. She ran for Louisiana Register of State Lands against Lucille May Grace in 1948, before finally winning the position in 1952. After Grace took back the seat in 1956, Moore returned in 1960 and served until 1976. Her position entailed the responsibility of administering property owned by the state of Louisiana. She was also a heritage preserver, as was indicated in her efforts to salvage a Civil War battlefield near Baton Rouge.

Moore was inducted to the Louisiana Center for Women in Government and Business Hall of Fame in 1995. Following a stroke in October the previous year, she died on February 20, 1999.

Preceded by Lucille May Grace	Louisiana Register of State Lands; 1952–1956	Next: Lucille May Grace

Preceded by Missing	Louisiana Register of State Lands; 1960–1976	Next: Elected office abolished
