= J. D. DeBlieux =

United States politician

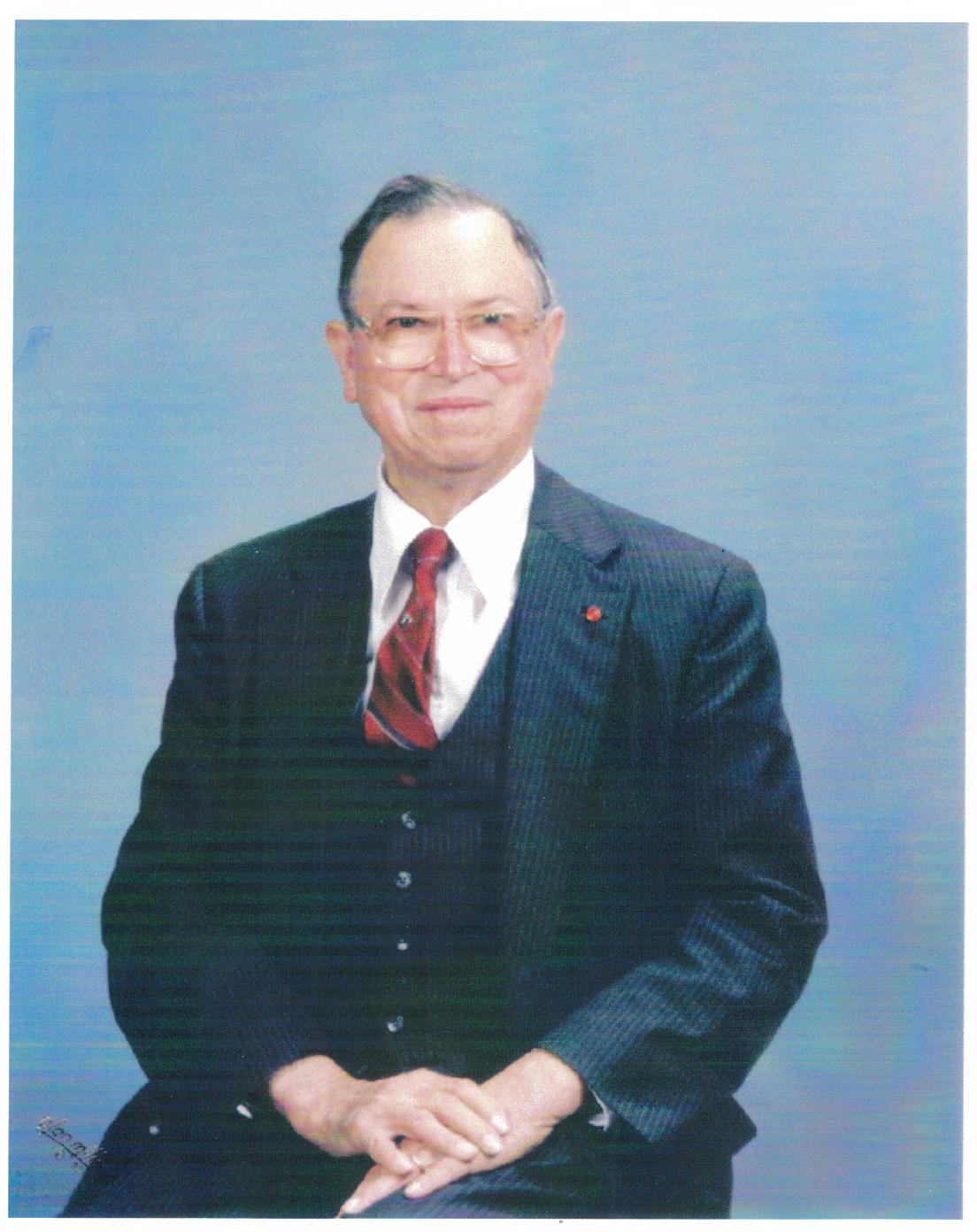

Joseph Davis DeBlieux (September 12, 1912-March 13, 2005) was a lawyer and state senator in Louisiana. He worked as a lawyer in Baton Rouge and represented East Baton Rouge Parish in the Louisiana Senate from 1956 to 1960 and from 1964 to 1976. He was a Democrat. A "principled segregationist" he tried to exclude college sports teams from segregation laws because of adverse consequences for the state's college teams.

He was interviewed regarding school desegregation. He criticized the state legislator for attempting to flout federal desegregation rulings.

He was involved in a dispute over which party could use the rooster to represent it.

== See also ==
- 1966 United States Senate election in Louisiana
- W. Henson Moore III
- John Rarick
