= 1966 United States Senate election in Louisiana =

1966 Democratic Senate primary election in Louisiana
- August 13, 1966
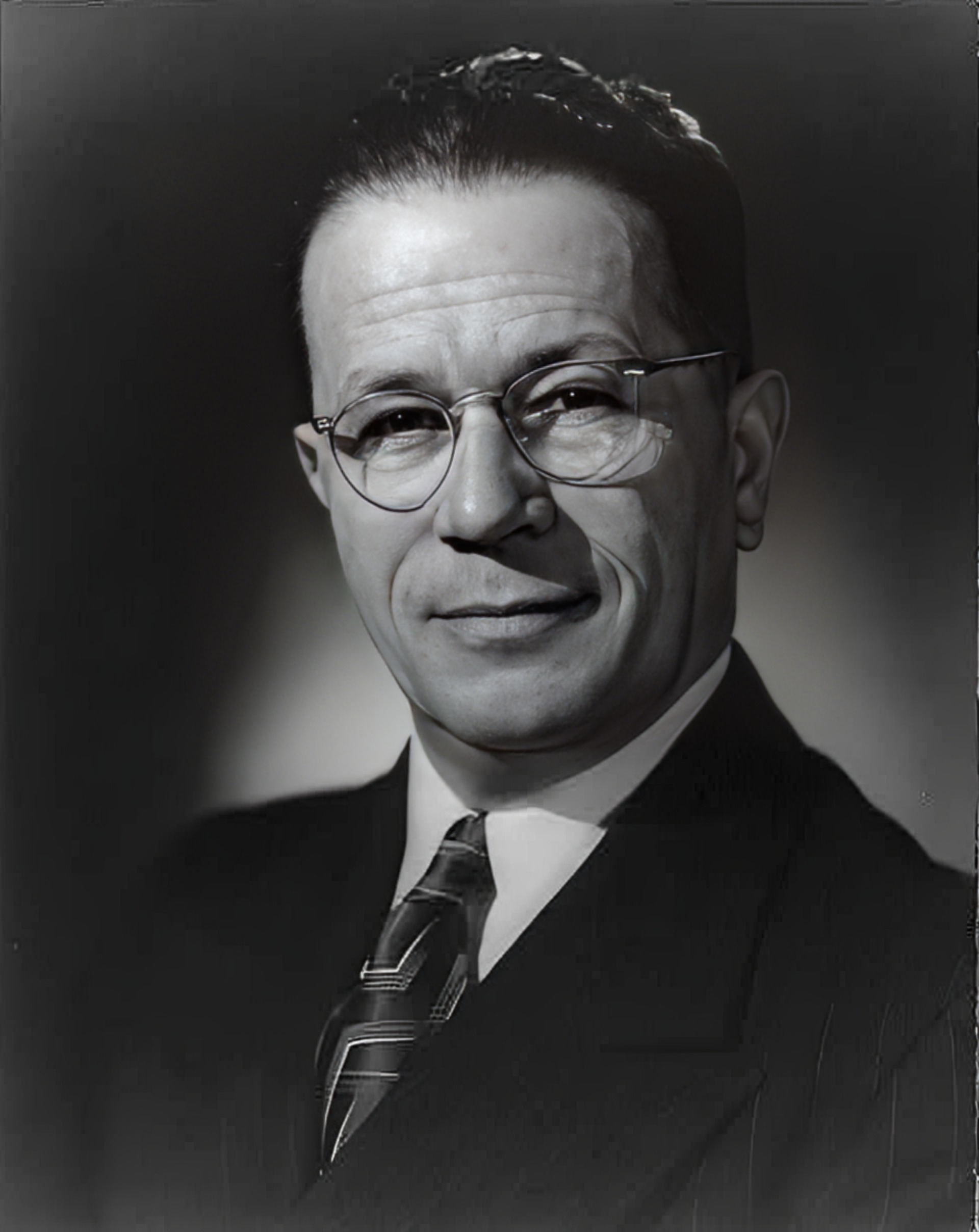

Nominee	Allen Ellender	J. D. DeBlieux	Troyce Guice
Party	Democratic	Democratic	Democratic
Popular vote	494,619	94,154	78,137
Percentage	74.17%	14.12%	11.72%
- Parish results Ellender: 50–60% 60–70% 70–80% 80–90% >90% DeBlieux: 50–60%
U.S. senator before election
Allen Ellender
Democratic
Elected U.S. Senator
Allen Ellender
Democratic

The 1966 United States Senate election in Louisiana was held on November 8, 1966. Incumbent Democratic Senator Allen Ellender was elected to a sixth term in office.

On August 13, Ellender won the Democratic primary with 74.17% of the vote. At this time, Louisiana was a one-party state and the Democratic nomination was tantamount to victory. Ellender won the November general election without an opponent.

== Democratic primary ==
=== Candidates ===
- J. D. DeBlieux, State Senator from Baton Rouge and civil rights activist
- Allen Ellender, incumbent United States Senator
- Troyce Guice, conservative businessman from Ferriday

=== Results ===
1966 United States Senate Democratic primary
Party	Candidate	Votes	%
Democratic	Allen Ellender (incumbent)	494,619	74.17
Democratic	J. D. DeBlieux	94,154	14.12
Democratic	Troyce Guice	78,137	11.72
Total votes		666,910	100.00

== General election ==
1966 United States Senate election
Party	Candidate	Votes	%	±%
Democratic	Allen Ellender (incumbent)	437,695	100.00%	Steady
Total votes		437,695	100.00%	
