= Robert F. Kennon =

American judge (1902–1988)

Bob Kennon
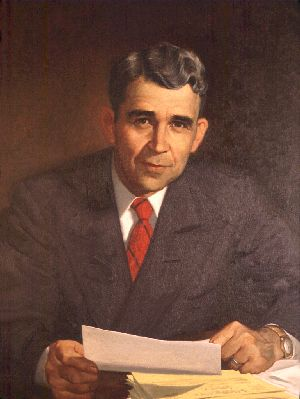

48th Governor of Louisiana
- In office May 13, 1952 – May 8, 1956
- Lieutenant: C. E. Barham
- Preceded by: Earl Long
- Succeeded by: Earl Long

Chair of the National Governors Association
- In office July 11, 1954 – August 9, 1955
- Preceded by: Daniel I. J. Thornton
- Succeeded by: Arthur B. Langlie

Judge of the Louisiana Second Circuit Court of Appeal
- In office 1945–1952
- Preceded by: Harmon Caldwell Drew
- Succeeded by: J. Frank McInnis

Associate Justice of the Louisiana Supreme Court
- In office 1945–1946
- Preceded by: Archibald T. Higgins
- Succeeded by: E. Howard McCaleb

District Attorney of Bossier and Webster Parishes
- In office December 6, 1930 – January 6, 1941
- Preceded by: R. H. Lee
- Succeeded by: Graydon Kitchens (Acting)

Mayor of Minden, Louisiana
- In office 1926–1928
- Preceded by: Connell Fort
- Succeeded by: Henry L. Bridges

Personal details
- Born: Robert Floyd Kennon; August 21, 1902 Dubberly, Louisiana, U.S.
- Died: January 11, 1988 (aged 85) Baton Rouge, Louisiana, U.S.
- Party: Democratic
- Spouse: Eugenia Sentell
- Children: 3
- Education: Louisiana State University (BA, LLB)

Military service
- Allegiance: United States
- Branch/service: US Army
- Rank: Colonel
- Battles/wars: World War II

Robert Floyd Kennon Sr. (August 21, 1902 – January 11, 1988), was an American conservative politician and judge who served as the 48th governor of Louisiana, an associate justice of the Louisiana Supreme Court, a judge of the Louisiana Second Circuit Court of Appeal, the district attorney of Bossier Parish and Webster Parish, and mayor of Minden, Louisiana. During Kennon's governorship, he additionally served as chairman of the National Governors Association and chairman of the Council of State Governments.

== Early life ==
Kennon was born near Minden, Louisiana. He graduated from Minden High School in 1919 and then went to Louisiana State University. While at LSU, Kennon played football and tennis. He completed his undergrad there in 1923 and his law degree there in 1925.

== Career ==
In 1925, Kennon was elected mayor of Minden, Louisiana, at the age of 23. He served in that position until 1928. In 1930, he became district attorney for Bossier Parish. He served as a district attorney until 1940. He also served as district attorney in Webster Parish. Apparently he was attorney for both parishes at the same time.

Kennon was elected to the 2nd circuit court of appeals in 1940. However, he instead of serving joined the United States military and did not take up active service as a judge until after World War II.

While governor, Kennon reestablished the state civil service in Louisiana, which had been abolished by his predecessor Earl Long. He also advocated constitutional amendments to limit the power of the governor's office. He also worked to create home rule for New Orleans and end state government interference in local issues there. Other things Kennon did while governor were ensuring that every precinct had a voting machine while working to suppress illegal slot machines and gambling in the state. During Kennon's governorship, he additionally served as chairman of the National Governors Association from 1954 to 1955, and as chairman of the Council of State Governments in 1955.

Party political offices
| Preceded by Earl Long | Democratic nominee for Governor of Louisiana; 1952 | Succeeded by Earl Long |
Political offices
| Preceded by Earl Long | Governor of Louisiana; 1952–1956 | Succeeded by Earl Long |
| Preceded by Daniel I. J. Thornton | Chair of the National Governors Association; 1954–1955 | Succeeded by Arthur B. Langlie |
