= Columbia, Louisiana =

- Town
- Town of Columbia
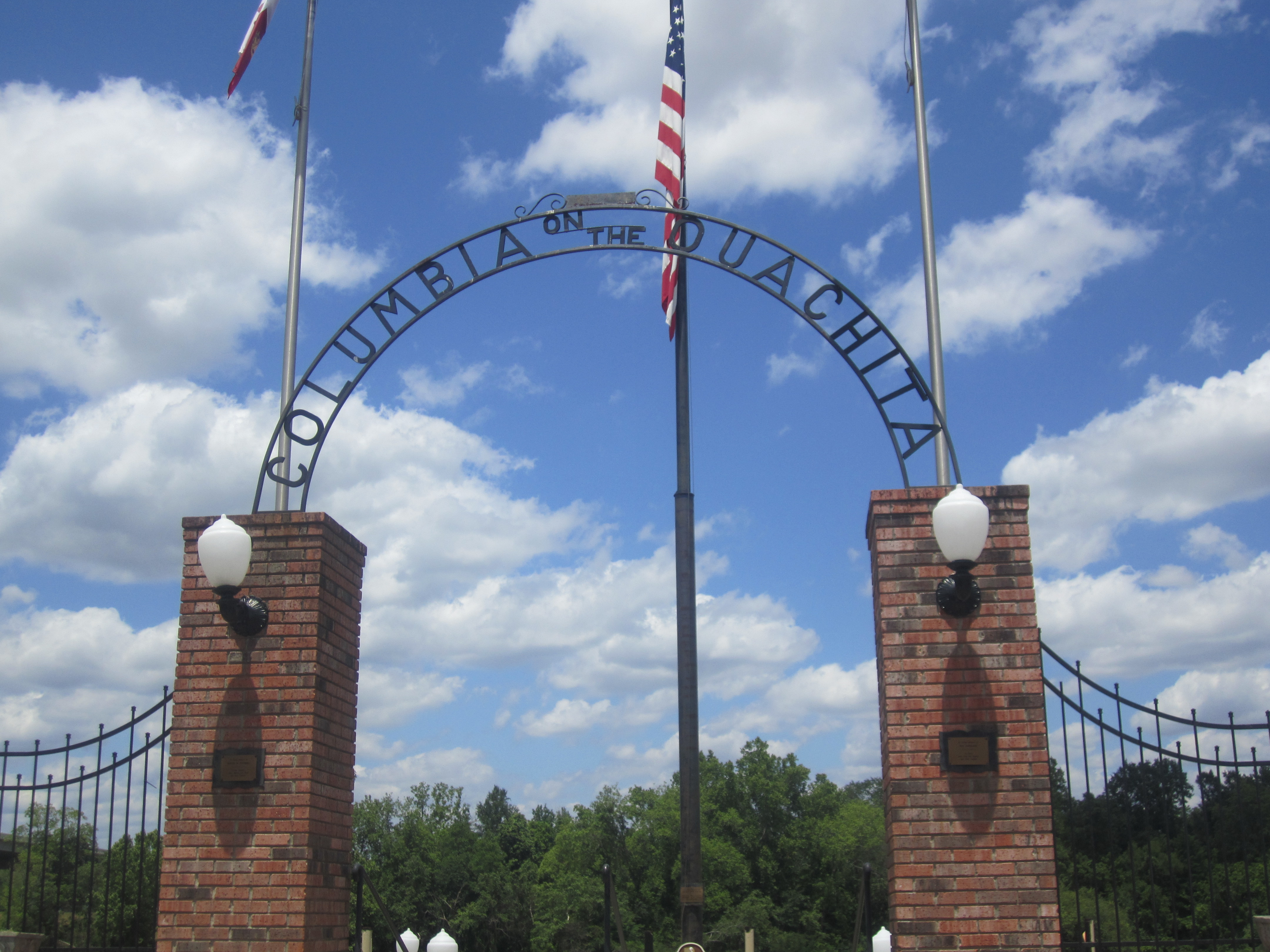
- Gateway to Ouachita River at Columbia
- Nickname: Columbia on the Ouachita
- Location of Columbia in Caldwell Parish, Louisiana.

- Location of Louisiana in the United States
- Coordinates: 32°06′09″N 92°04′37″W
- Country: United States
- State: Louisiana
- Parish: Caldwell
- Founded: 1827

Government
  - Mayor: Hannah Cummings Springer

Area
  - Total: 0.77 sq mi (2.00 km^{2})
  - Land: 0.76 sq mi (1.98 km^{2})
  - Water: 0.0077 sq mi (0.02 km^{2})
- Elevation: 98 ft (30 m)

Population (2020)
  - Total: 277
  - Rank: CW: 3rd
  - Density: 362.4/sq mi (139.94/km^{2})
- Time zone: UTC-6 (CST)
  - Summer (DST): UTC-5 (CDT)
- ZIP Code: 71418
- Area code: 318
- FIPS code: 22-16830
- GNIS feature ID: 2406299
- Website: townofcolumbia.net

Columbia is a town in and the parish seat of Caldwell Parish, Louisiana, United States. The population was 277 in 2020.

== History ==
The land that became Columbia was first cleared by Daniel Humphries in 1827. A store was built a few years later the only settlement between Monroe, Louisiana, and the settlements of the Black River was formed. The harbor became a busy port for shipping cotton by steamboats and Packet boats until the arrival of the railroad. In February 1864 Columbia was the location of a skirmish between Federal and Confederate troops during the Civil War and there are several plantations in the area.

== Geography ==
Columbia is located just east of the center of Caldwell Parish on the southwest bank of the Ouachita River. U.S. Route 165 passes through the center of town and bridges the river, leading north 32 miles (51 km) to Monroe and south 64 miles (103 km) to Alexandria.

According to the United States Census Bureau, the town has a total area of 0.77 square miles (2.00 km^{2}), of which 0.76 square miles (1.96 km^{2}) is land and 0.01 square miles (0.03 km^{2}), or 1.75%, is water.

== Demographics ==
Historical population
Census	Pop.	Note	%±
1870	235		—
1880	210		−10.6%
1890	352		67.6%
1900	382		8.5%
1910	500		30.9%
1920	434		−13.2%
1930	760		75.1%
1940	840		10.5%
1950	920		9.5%
1960	1,021		11.0%
1970	1,000		−2.1%
1980	687		−31.3%
1990	386		−43.8%
2000	477		23.6%
2010	390		−18.2%
2020	277		−29.0%
2025 (est.)	262	▼	−5.4%
U.S. Decennial Census

Columbia racial composition as of 2020
Race	Number	Percentage
White (non-Hispanic)	202	72.92%
Black or African American (non-Hispanic)	48	17.33%
Asian	2	0.72%
Other/Mixed	10	3.61%
Hispanic or Latino	15	5.42%

As of the 2020 United States census, there were 277 people, 152 households, and 107 families residing in the town.

== Government and infrastructure ==
Law enforcement services are provided by the Columbia Police Department and the Caldwell Parish Sheriff's Office. Fire protection services are provided by the Columbia Volunteer Fire Department, and by other Volunteer Fire Departments across the parish when needed.

== Notable people ==
- Buddy Caldwell, Attorney General of Louisiana, elected in 2007
- Graves B. Erskine, U.S. Marine Corps general; combat officer in World War I
- J. D. DeBlieux, Louisiana State Senator 1956-1960 & 1964-1976
- Pam Kelly, basketball player, recipient of the Wade Trophy in 1982
- Lelon Kenney, Louisiana state representative, farmer, and businessman
- John J. McKeithen, governor of Louisiana (1964–1972)
- W. Fox McKeithen, Louisiana House of Representatives, 1984–1988
- Clay Parker, former pitcher for the New York Yankees & Seattle Mariners
- Neil Riser, state senator elected in 2007 from the 32nd District
- Chet D. Traylor, Louisiana Supreme Court, 1997–2009

== Gallery ==
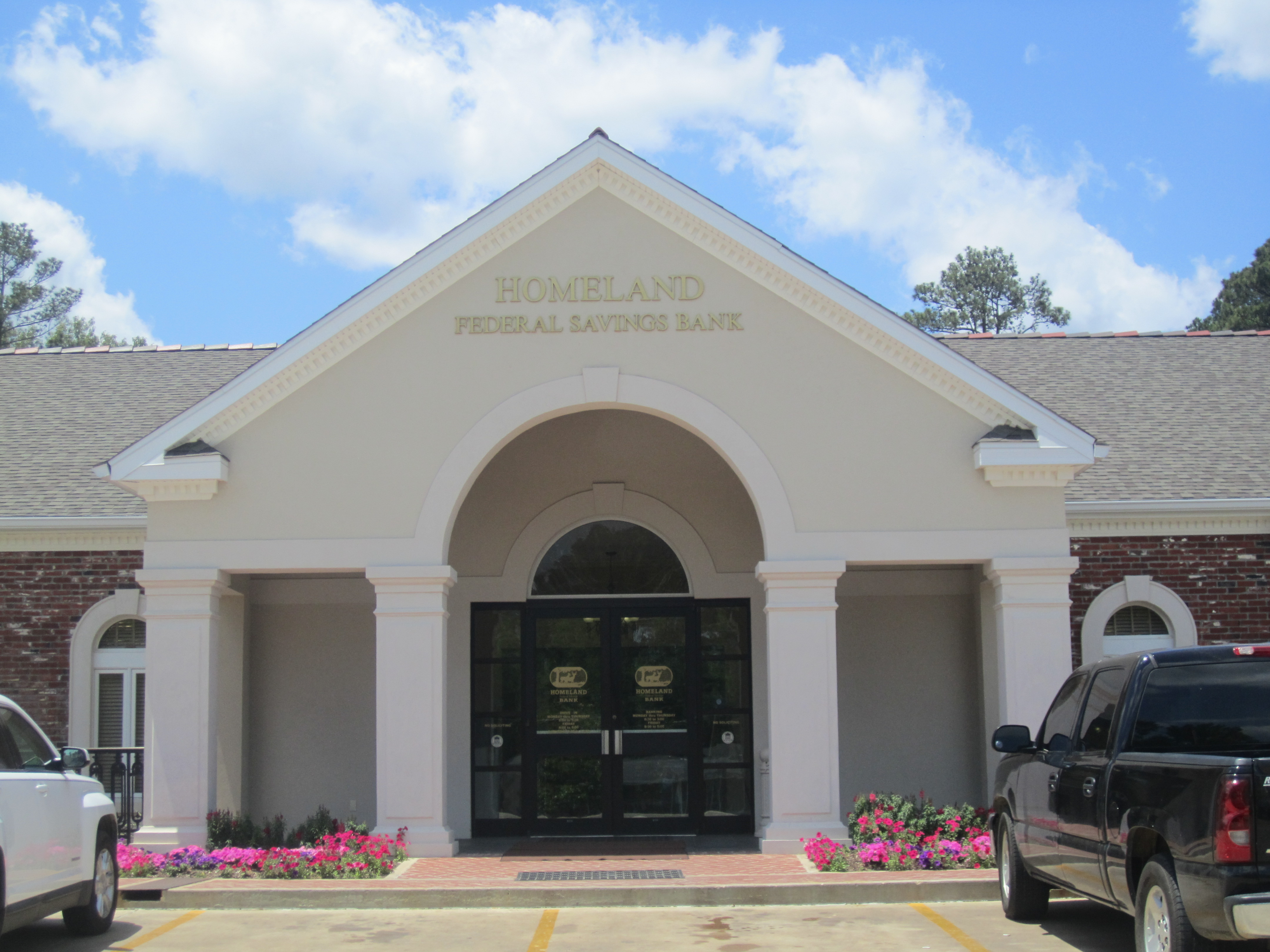
Homeland Federal Savings Bank is located off U.S. Highway 165 in Columbia

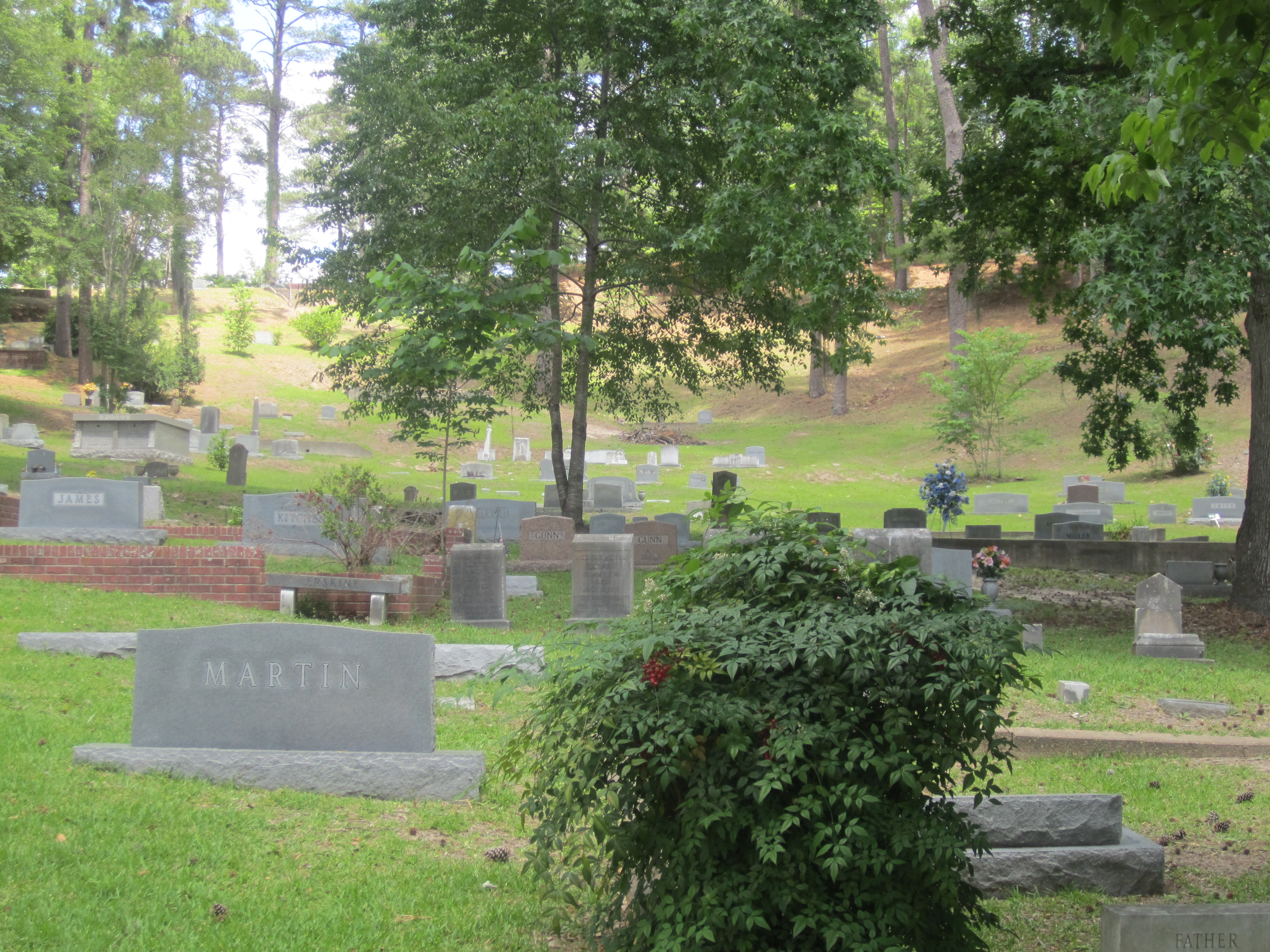
A portion of the hillside graves at the large but dispersed Columbia Hill Cemetery in Columbia. The cemetery was launched just prior to the American Civil War during a yellow fever epidemic.

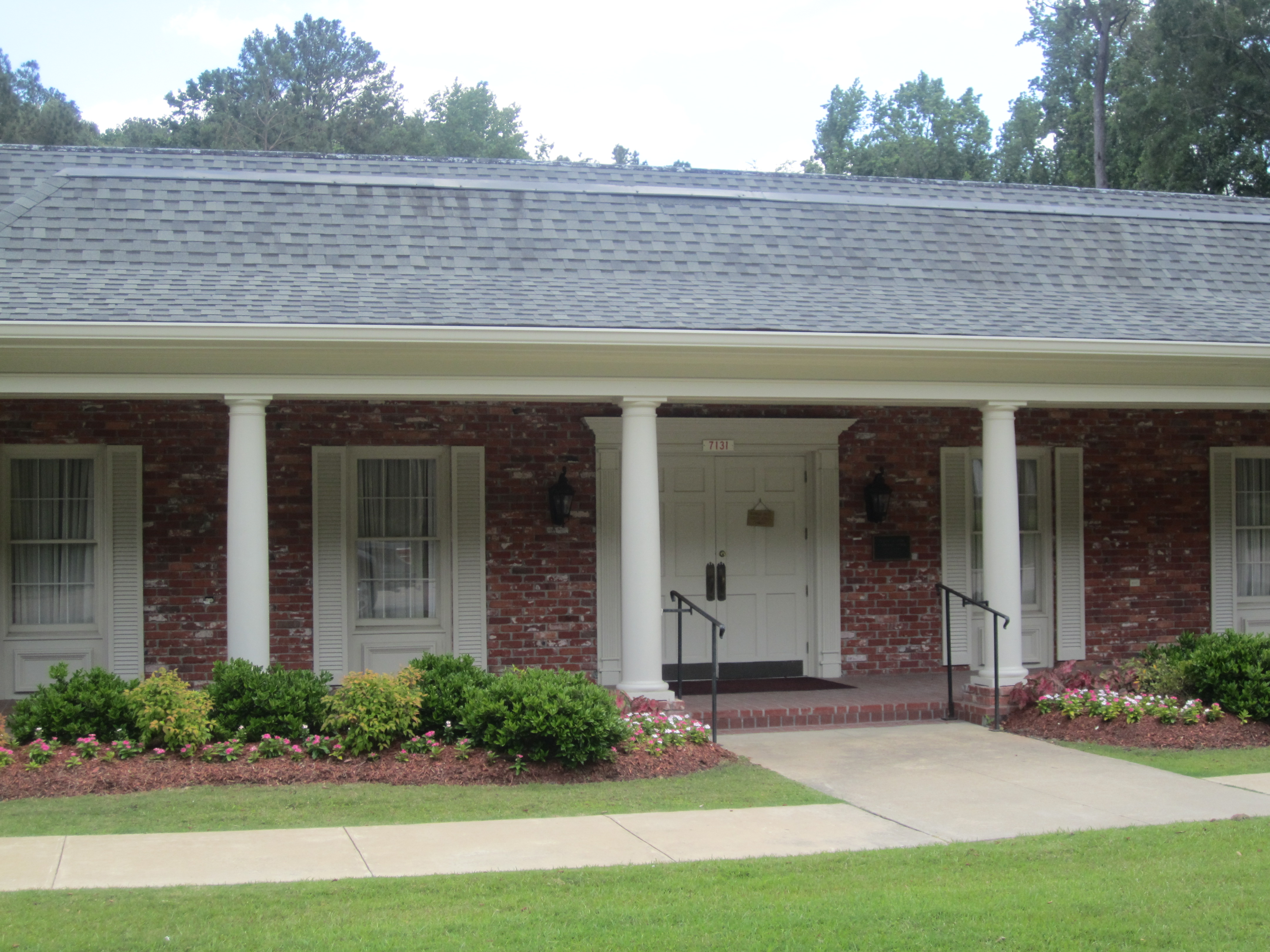
Riser and Son Funeral Home in Columbia is owned by State Senator Neil Riser.

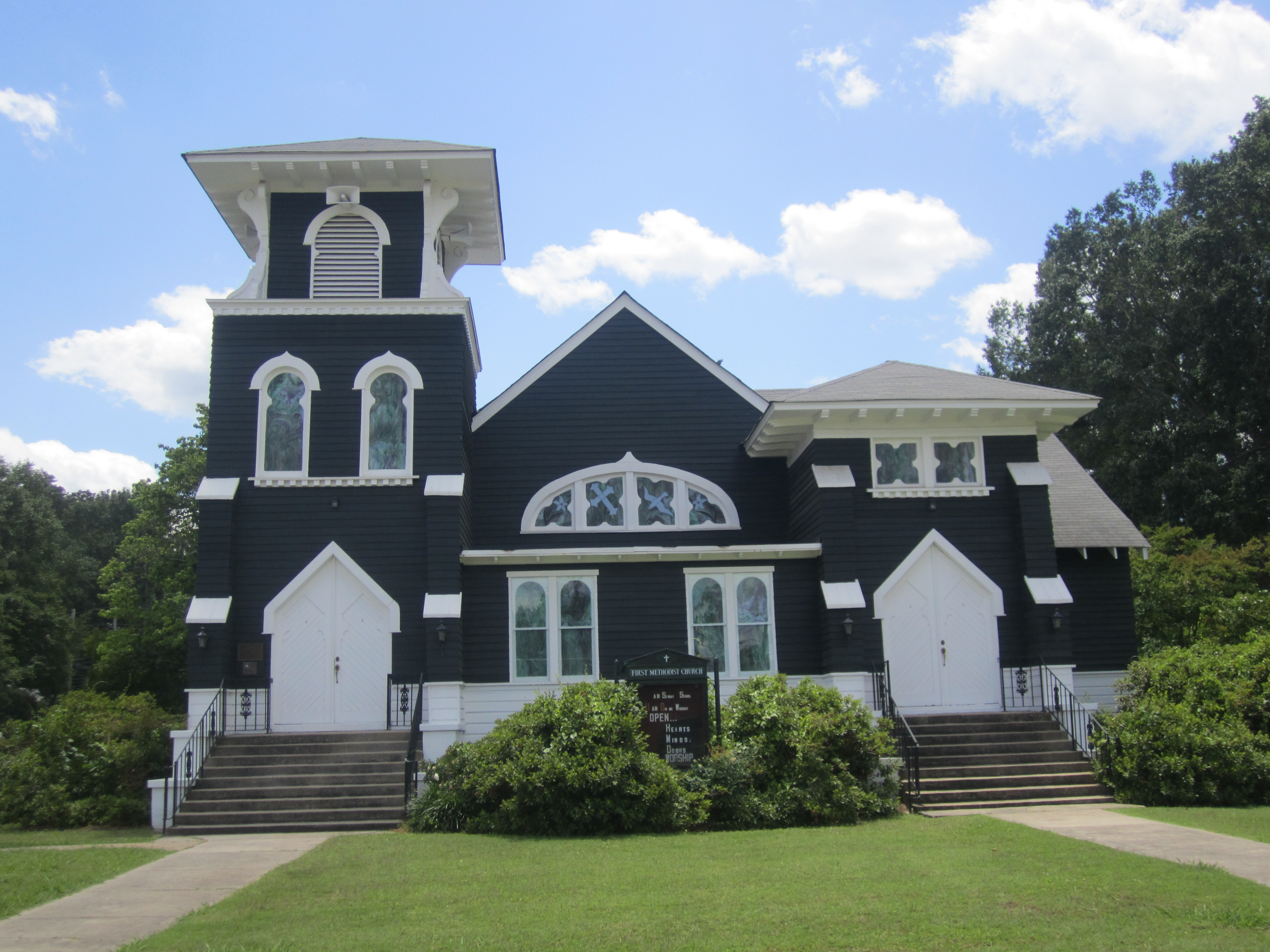
At this site First United Methodist Church in Columbia dates to 1838. The current building was constructed in 1911. Previously, circuit riders served Caldwell Parish.

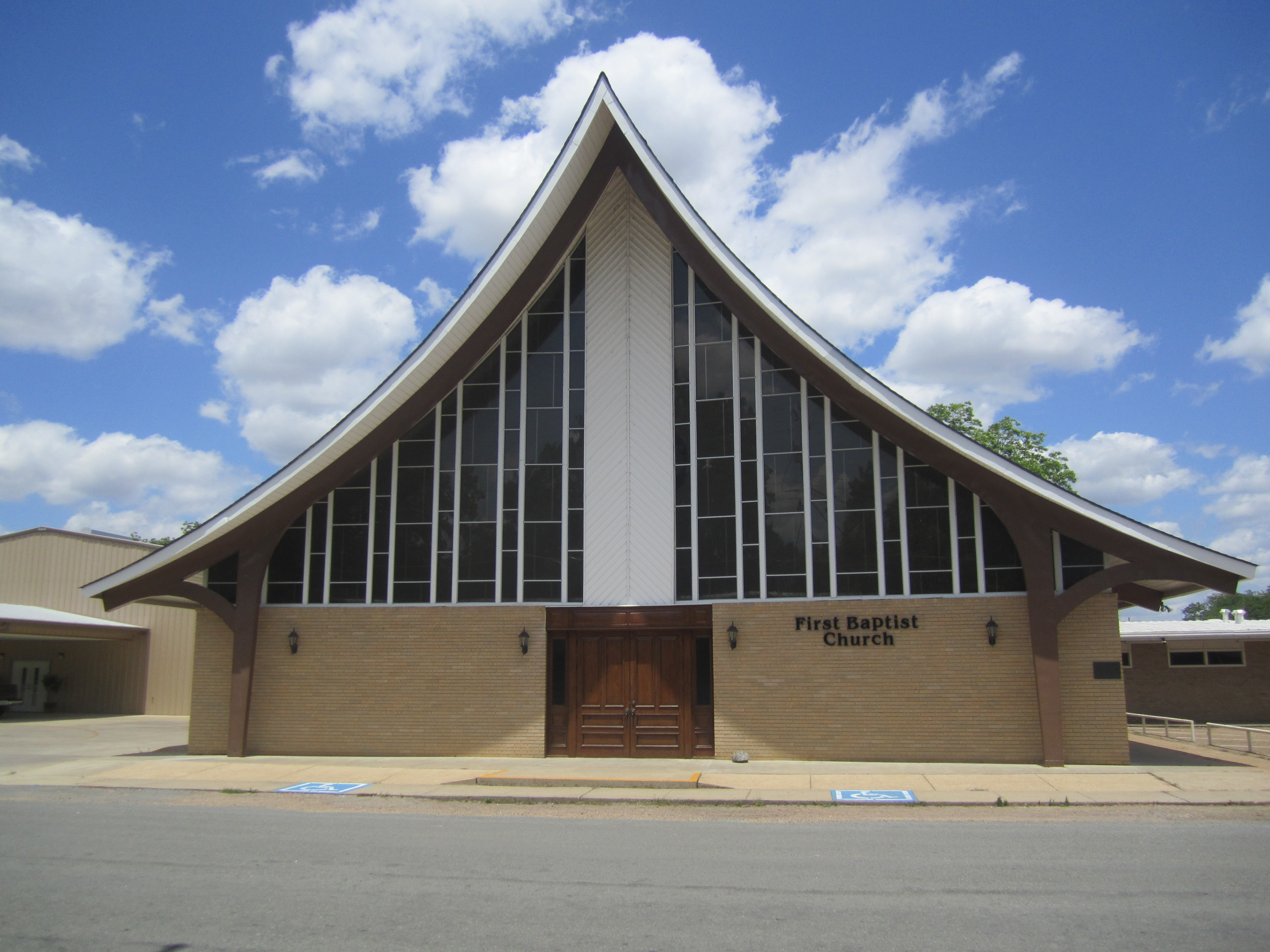
First Baptist Church in Columbia

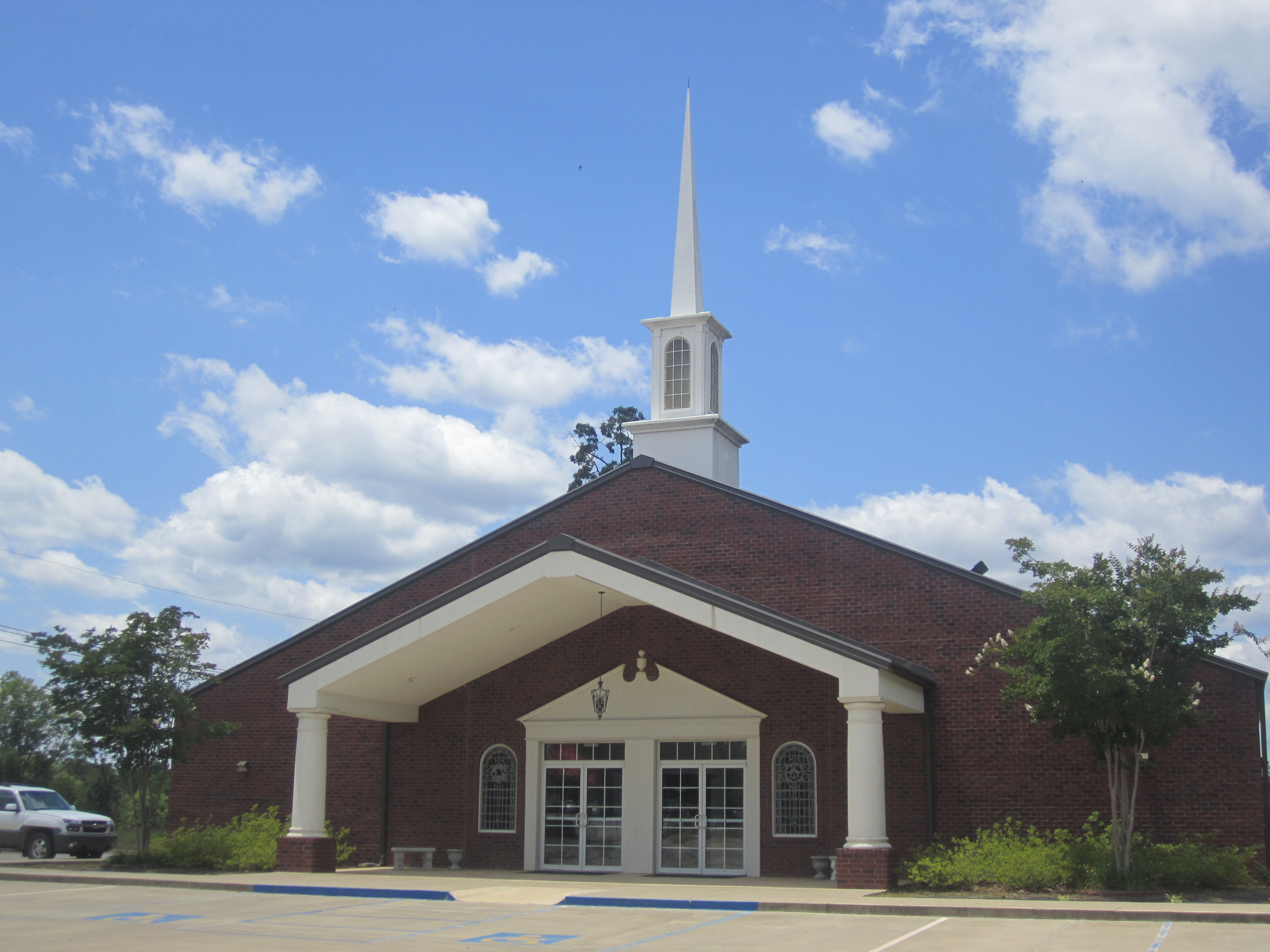
Columbia Heights Baptist Church off Highway 165 calls itself "The Lighthouse on the Hill".
